= Crookhall =

Village in County Durham, England

Coordinates: 54.849°N 1.822°W

- Location within County Durham
- OS grid reference: NZ115505
- Unitary authority: County Durham
- Ceremonial county: County Durham
- Region: North East
- Country: England
- Sovereign state: United Kingdom
- Post town: DURHAM
- Postcode district: DH8
- Police: Durham
- Fire: County Durham and Darlington
- Ambulance: North East

Crookhall is a village in County Durham, in England. It is situated between Consett and Delves Lane. It is named after, and intimately connected to, Crook Hall which once stood nearby.

== History ==
First documented in the Boldon Book as “Cruketon pays four marks.” It is also listed in Bishops Hatfield's survey (1381) as, "John de Kirkby held the vill of Crokhogh and a hundred acres of arable arid woodland, by knight's service and 2s. and half an acre at Stokerley, once of Peter del Croke, 4d." The reference to a vill suggests the village or a hamlet existed at that time.

The present Crookhall village was created in about 1844 when George Baker, MP of Crook Hall started to exploit the coal reserves on his estate. One up, one down cottages called Red Row and Blue Row were constructed for the mineworkers. The last of the cottages were demolished in about 1958/9 and the Miner's Institute converted to a Community Centre.

Coal mining began in 1838 with boring operations followed in 1838 by the opening of the Stockerley House Pit and Crook Hall Colliery. The Crookhall iron works were established in 1845.

Crook Hall itself served as one of two Catholic seminaries created in England when the students at the English College, Douai, France were expelled in 1793 after the French Revolution. It was demolished circa 1900.
