= Renatus Bellott =

English Tory politician

Renatus Bellott (died 1709) was an English Tory politician.

== Biography ==
Bellott was the only son of Christopher Bellott and Bridget (née Pendarves). He was educated at Pembroke College, Cambridge and the Middle Temple. At the 1702 English general election he was returned as a Member of Parliament for the rotten borough of Mitchell in Cornwall with the support of Sir Richard Vyvyan, 3rd Baronet. Bellott made little impact in the Commons and made no recorded speeches. He was recorded as a likely Tacker in October 1704, but did not vote for the Tack a month later. As a consequence, he was dropped from the ballot in Mitchell at the 1705 English general election. He represented Penwith and Kerrier in the Cornish Stannary Parliament in 1703 and 1710.

He was the owner of the barton of Bochym on the Lizard Peninsula. His wife was Mary, the daughter of Edmund Spoure and Mary née Rodd. On her father's death she inherited the barton of Trebartha. They had one son, named after his father, who died in 1712 at the age of eight. Renatus Bellott died of fever in 1709 and Bochym was sold to George Robinson, Esq. to pay off debts.

Parliament of England
Preceded by William Courtney; Sir Richard Vyvyan	Member of Parliament for Mitchell; 1702–1705; With: Francis Basset	Succeeded by Sir William Hodges; Hugh Fortescue
