= Crook Hall =

Coordinates: 54.8512°N 1.8097°W

Crook Hall, sited near Lanchester, County Durham, some 8 miles (13 km) north west of the city of Durham, was the seat of the Baker family and one of two Roman Catholic seminaries which temporarily replaced the Douai seminary in Douai, France when that college was suppressed soon after the French Revolution. Crook Hall was itself superseded after a few years by Ushaw College.

== History ==
First documented in the Boldon Book as “Cruketon pays four marks.” It is also listed in Bishops Hatfield's survey (1381) as, "John de Kirkby held the vill of Crokhogh and a hundred acres of arable arid woodland, by knight's service and 2s. and half an acre at Stokerley, once of Peter del Croke, 4d."

The estate changed hands numerous times during the following centuries ultimately ending up in the possession of the Baker family when purchased by Sir George Baker (1596-1667) in c. 1635. Sir George was the second son of Oswald Baker of Durham. Sir George served as a recorder of Newcastle-on-Tyne and was a defender of that town for King Charles during the Civil War. His son George inherited the estate in 1667. George Baker MP, grandson of the original owner and member of parliament for Durham City, remodelled the house in 1716. The antiquarian, Thomas Baker (1656-1740), was a member of the family.

Crook Hall

Crook Hall in 1894, shortly before it was demolished

When the Douai Catholic seminary closed in 1793 the students were hastily brought back to England with the intention of creating a new seminary there, after the approval of the Roman Catholic Relief Act 1791. The refugee students were divided into two groups, one of which (mainly composed of students who were destined for the Northern Vicariate) moved on 15 October 1794 into Crook Hall, which had been leased from George Baker. The mansion was at that time unoccupied since Baker had moved his primary residence to Elemore Hall.

They studied under the guidance of Thomas Eyre, one of the former professors, John Lingard, the future historian and John Daniel, the president of Douai at its suppression. After ten years Crook Hall proved inadequate and in 1804 Bishop William Gibson began the building of Ushaw College at nearby Ushaw Moor, to which the college transferred in 1808.

The local village of Crookhall developed as coal and iron ore deposits were exploited. The hall was purchased by the Consett Iron Company in 1877 and demolished circa 1900. There was an avenue of beech trees which led from Delves Lane to Crook Hall. In 1890 it was noted that very few of the trees remained, the last falling in 1885. A row of beech still existed on either side of the fishpond in front of the hall which was described as "ruined".
