= Joseph Hodges =

Joseph Hodges may refer to:

- Joseph Howard Hodges (1911–1985), American Catholic prelate
- Joseph Lawson Hodges Jr. (1922–2000), statistician
- Joseph Jehoida Hodges (1876–1930), Welsh rugby union player
- Sir Joseph Hodges, 2nd Baronet (c. 1704–1722) of the Hodges baronets
