= Francis Basset (1674–1721) =

English Tory politician (1674–1721)

Francis Basset (10 February 1674 – 11 December 1721) was an English Tory politician.

== Biography ==
Basset was the only son of Francis Basset of Tehidy, Cornwall and Lucy Hele, and a great-grandson of the Royalist soldier Sir Francis Bassett. He entered Pembroke College, Cambridge in 1693. He succeeded to his father's estates, including considerable tin mines.

In the November 1701 English general election, Basset was an active supporter of the Tory politician James Buller. Basset was himself returned as a Tory Member of Parliament for the rotten borough of Mitchell in the following 1702 English general election. In 1703 he represented Tywarnhaile in the Cornish Stannary Parliament. In October 1704 he was listed as a likely member of the Tackers, but he did not vote the Tack on 28 November owing to being absent from the House of Commons. On 25 November 1704 he was ordered into custody for an unauthorised absence from the House and he was not discharged until 8 January 1705. He did not stand at any subsequent election. Basset served a term as High Sheriff of Cornwall in 1708–1709.

Parliament of England
Preceded by William Courtney; Sir Richard Vyvyan, Bt	Member of Parliament for Mitchell with Renatus Bellott; 1702–1705	Succeeded by Sir William Hodges, Bt; Hugh Fortescue
