= Thomas Conyers =

English politician (c.1666-1728)

Thomas Conyers (ca. 1666 – 4 October 1728) of Elemore Hall, County Durham was an English Tory politician who sat in the English House of Commons between 1695 and 1708 and in the British House of Commons from 1708 to 1727.

== Early life ==
Conyers was the fifth son of Nicholas Conyers of Boulby, Yorkshire and the only son of his third wife Margaret Freville, daughter of Nicholas Freville of Hardwick, county Durham. He was a cousin of John Conyers. He matriculated at Trinity College, Oxford on 13 May 1684, aged 17, and was admitted at the Middle Temple to study law in 1686. He married, by licence dated 25 June 1690, Elizabeth Hall, the daughter and heiress of Thomas Hall of Elemore.

== Political career ==
By the time of his marriage, Conyers had acquired property in county Durham. He was made Freeman of Durham in 1697 and was elected in a contest as Tory Member of Parliament for Durham City at the 1698 English general election. He was re-elected at the first general election of 1701 and was blacklisted for opposing the preparations for war with France. He did not stand at the second election of that year but was returned unopposed for Durham in the 1702 English general election. In 1704 he was appointed Equerry to Prince George of Denmark and avoided the vote for the Tack. At the 1705 English general election he topped the poll in a contest, but after he voted against the Court candidate for Speaker in 1705, he was dismissed from his post as Equerry in 1706. He was returned unopposed as MP at the 1708 British general election. There was a contest again at the 1710 British general election and he topped the poll. He was listed as one of the ‘Tory patriots’ who had opposed the continuation of the war and one of the ‘worthy patriots’ who detected the mismanagements of the previous administration. He voted in support of the French commerce bill of 18 June 1713. At the 1713 British general election, he and his son-in-law George Baker, were both returned unopposed at Durham City. Throughout the parliaments he voted and was listed as a Tory.

Conyers and his son-in-law were returned unopposed again as MPs for Durham City at the 1715 British general election. He voted consistently against the Whig administration. At the 1722 British general election he was successful in a contest for the seat. He did not stand in 1727.

== Death and legacy ==
Conyers died on 4 October 1728. He and his wife had one daughter Elizabeth, who inherited the Elemore estate. She married George Baker, and their son, another George, rebuilt Elemore Hall.

Parliament of England
Preceded by Charles Montagu; Henry Liddell	Member of Parliament for Durham City; 1698–1701; With: Charles Montagu	Succeeded by Charles Montagu; Sir Henry Belasyse
Preceded by Charles Montagu; Sir Henry Belasyse	Member of Parliament for Durham City; 1702–1708; With: Sir Henry Belasyse	Succeeded by Parliament of Great Britain
Parliament of Great Britain
Preceded by Parliament of England	Member of Parliament for Durham City; 1708–1727; With: James Nicolson 1708-1710; Sir Henry Belasyse 1710-1712; Robert Shafto 1712-1713; George Baker 1713-1722; Charles Talbot 1722-1727	Succeeded by Robert Shafto; Charles Talbot
