= Richard Vyvyan =

Richard Vyvyan may refer to:

- Sir Richard Vyvyan, 1st Baronet (c. 1613–1665), Member of Parliament and Royalist during the English Civil War
- Sir Richard Vyvyan, 3rd Baronet (1681–1736), Member of Parliament and prominent Jacobite
- Sir Richard Vyvyan, 8th Baronet (1800–1879), Member of Parliament and Fellow of the Royal Society
