= Sir William Hodges, 1st Baronet =

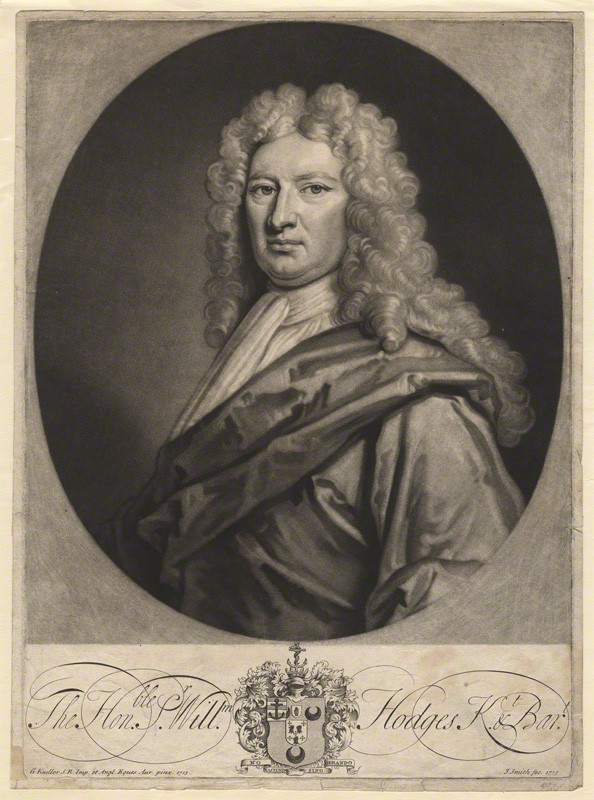
A 1715 engraving of Hodges by John Smith after Godfrey Kneller

Sir William Hodges, 1st Baronet (c. 1645 – 31 July 1714) was an English merchant and Whig politician who sat in the English and British House of Commons from 1705 to 1710.

== Early life ==
Hodges was the son of John Hodges of Cotherstock or Cotterstock, Northamptonshire. His father died in 1665. He married by licence on 25 April 1681, Sarah Hall, daughter of Joseph Hall, merchant, of London and Ballasore, Bengal. He resided in 1681 in Mincing Lane.

== Career ==
Hodges acquired a fortune in the Spanish trade, and was in partnership at Cádiz with Christopher Hague, Ellis Terrell, and the Hon. Henry Bertie, according to his will. During the Nine Years' War he extended credit to the government, accepting a bill for £300,000, for the use of the English fleet under the command of Admiral Edward Russell. He was created a baronet, of Middlesex in the Baronetage of England, on 31 March 1697.

Hodges became a director of the Bank of England in 1703. He was returned as a Whig Member of Parliament for Mitchell at the 1705 English general election. He was returned again at the 1708 British general election but did not stand at the 1710 British general election.

== Death and legacy ==
Hodges had a house in Winchester Street, near Austin Friars when he died on 31 July 1714. He was buried on 6 August at St Katherine Coleman in Fenchurch Street. James Peller Malcolm describes his funeral, which was of unusual grandeur, with forty-two noblemen's coaches following the procession. He had an only son, Joseph, who succeeded to the baronetcy. Lady Hodges died in 1717.

== Notes ==
Parliament of England
Preceded by Renatus Bellott; Francis Basset	Member of Parliament for Mitchell; 1705–1707; With: Hugh Fortescue	Succeeded by Parliament of Great Britain
Parliament of Great Britain
Preceded by Parliament of England	Member of Parliament for Mitchell; 1707–1710; With: Hugh Fortescue	Succeeded by Abraham Blackmore; Richard Belasyse
Baronetage of England
New creation	Baronet (of Middlesex); 1697–1714	Succeeded by Joseph Hodges

Attribution

This article incorporates text from a publication now in the public domain: Lee, Sidney, ed. (1891). "Hodges, William (1645-1714)". Dictionary of National Biography. Vol. 27. London: Smith, Elder & Co.
