= Hugh Fortescue (1665–1719) =

British landowner and Whig politician

Arms of Fortescue: Azure, a bend engrailed argent, plain cotised or

Hugh Fortescue (2 June 1665 – December 1719) of Filleigh and Weare Giffard Hall in Devon and of Ebrington Manor in Gloucestershire, was a British landowner and Whig politician who sat in the English and British House of Commons between 1689 and 1713.

== Origins ==
Fortescue was the eldest son and heir of Arthur Fortescue (1622–1693) of Penwarne, Mevagissey, Cornwall and of Filleigh in Devon, and his wife Barbara Elford, a daughter of John Elford of Sheepstor in Devon.

== Career ==
Fortescue was returned as Member of Parliament for Tregony at the 1689 English general election. At the 1695 English general election he was returned as MP for Grampound. He was returned as MP for Truro at the 1698 English general election. He was returned again as MP for Tregony at the two general election of 1701. At the 1705 English general election he was returned as MP Mitchell and was returned there again at the 1708 British general election. He was returned as MP for Lostwithiel at the 1710 British general election. He was not prominent in the House of Commons being jailed for absence on two occasions and as well as a number of non-attendances.

== Marriages and children ==
Fortescue married twice:

Arms of Boscawen: Ermine, a rose gules barbed and seeded proper

- Firstly on 19 October 1692 to Bridget Boscawen (d. 1708), a daughter and eventual heiress of Hugh Boscawen, (1625–1701) by his wife Margaret Clinton, a daughter of Theophilus Clinton, 4th Earl of Lincoln, and one of the co-heiresses of the Barony of Clinton upon the death of Edward Clinton, 5th Earl of Lincoln in 1692. Bridget was the only child (out of eight sons and two daughters) to outlive her father Hugh Boscawen, (1625–1701); she brought money with her marriage thus increasing Fortescue's fortune. By Bridget Boscawen he had four children as follows:
  - Hugh Fortescue, 1st Earl Clinton (1696–1751), summoned to Parliament in 1721 as Baron Clinton, and in 1746 created Baron Fortescue of Castle Hill (with special remainder) and Earl of Clinton (with normal remainder). He rebuilt his ancestral manor house at Filliegh as a magnificent Palladian mansion which he called Castle Hill. He died leaving no sons when the earldom became extinct, but in accordance with the special remainder the Barony of Fortescue devolved on his younger half-brother Matthew Fortescue, 2nd Baron Fortescue (1719–1785).
  - Boscawen Fortescue, died unmarried;
  - Theophilus Fortescue, died unmarried;
  - Margaret Fortescue (d. 14 March 1760), died unmarried.

Arms of Aylmer: Argent, a cross sable between four Cornish choughs proper

- Secondly, after 1708, he married Lucy Aylmer, a daughter of Matthew Aylmer, 1st Baron Aylmer (circa 1650–1720). A stone relief-sculpted heraldic cartouche erected by him survives above the entrance door of his seat of Ebrington Manor House in Gloucestershire, displaying the arms of Fortescue impaling Aylmer. By Lucy Aylmer he had two further children:
  - Matthew Fortescue, 2nd Baron Fortescue (1719–1785), who in 1751 inherited the Barony of Fortescue by the special remainder following the death without male children of his elder half brother Hugh Fortescue, 1st Earl Clinton (1696–1751). His eldest son was Hugh Fortescue, 1st Earl Fortescue (1753–1841), of Castle Hill.
  - Lucy Fortescue (died 1747), married George Lyttelton, 1st Baron Lyttelton (1709–1773)

== Gallery ==
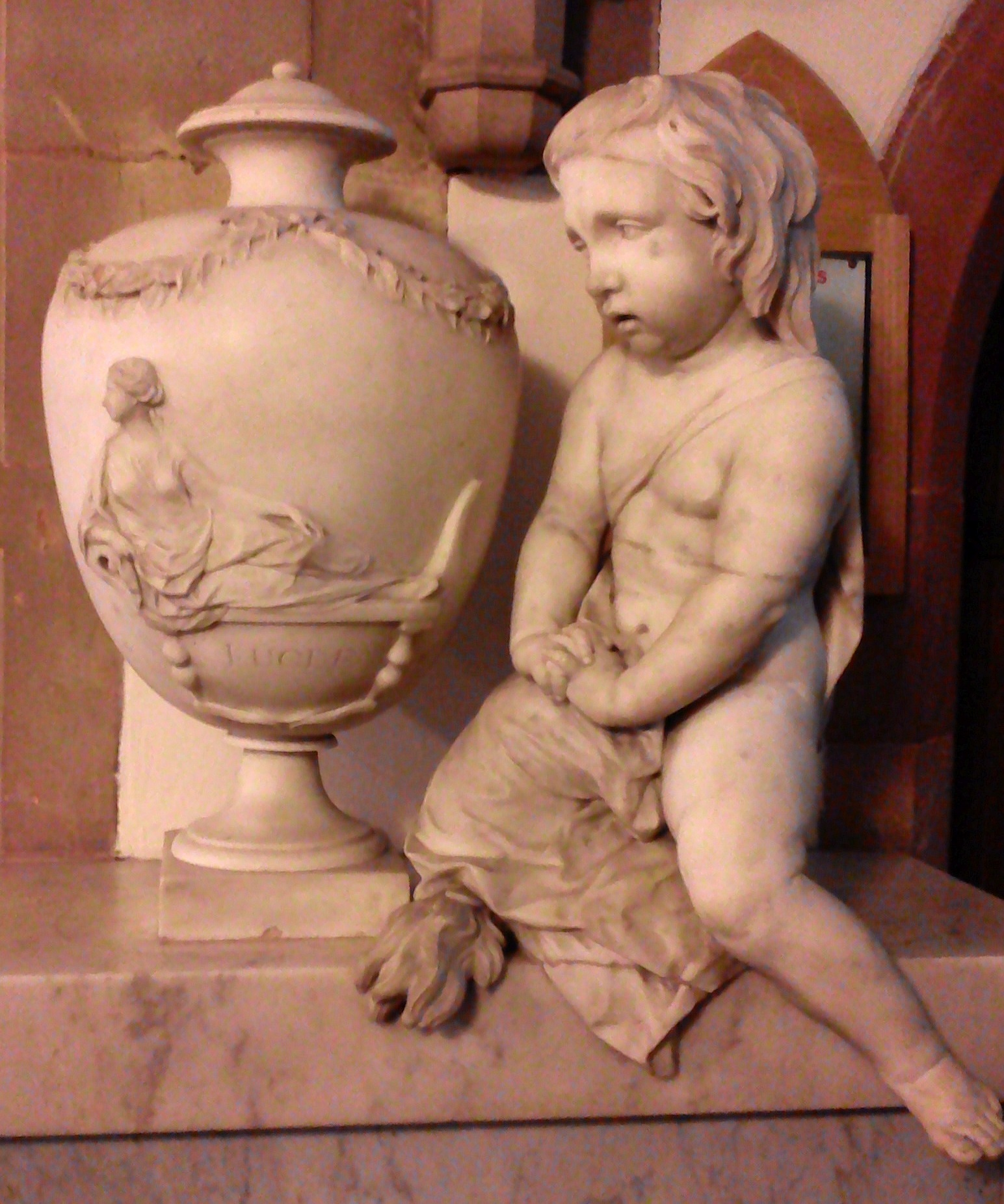
St John the Baptist Church, Hagley, memorial statue to Lucy Lyttelton (née Fortescue, died 1747), the first wife of George Lyttelton, 1st Baron Lyttelton

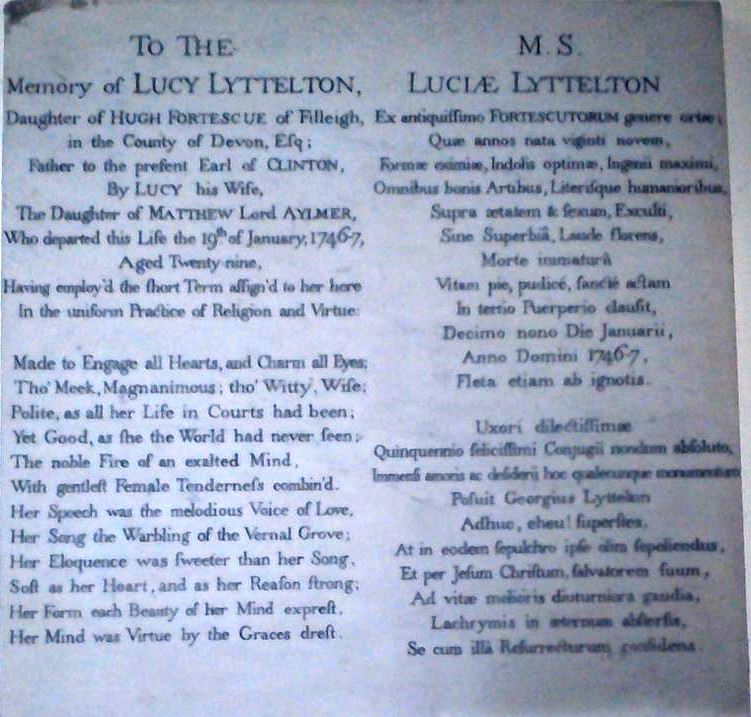
St John the Baptist Church, Hagley, memorial inscription to Lucy Lyttelton (née Fortescue, died 1747)

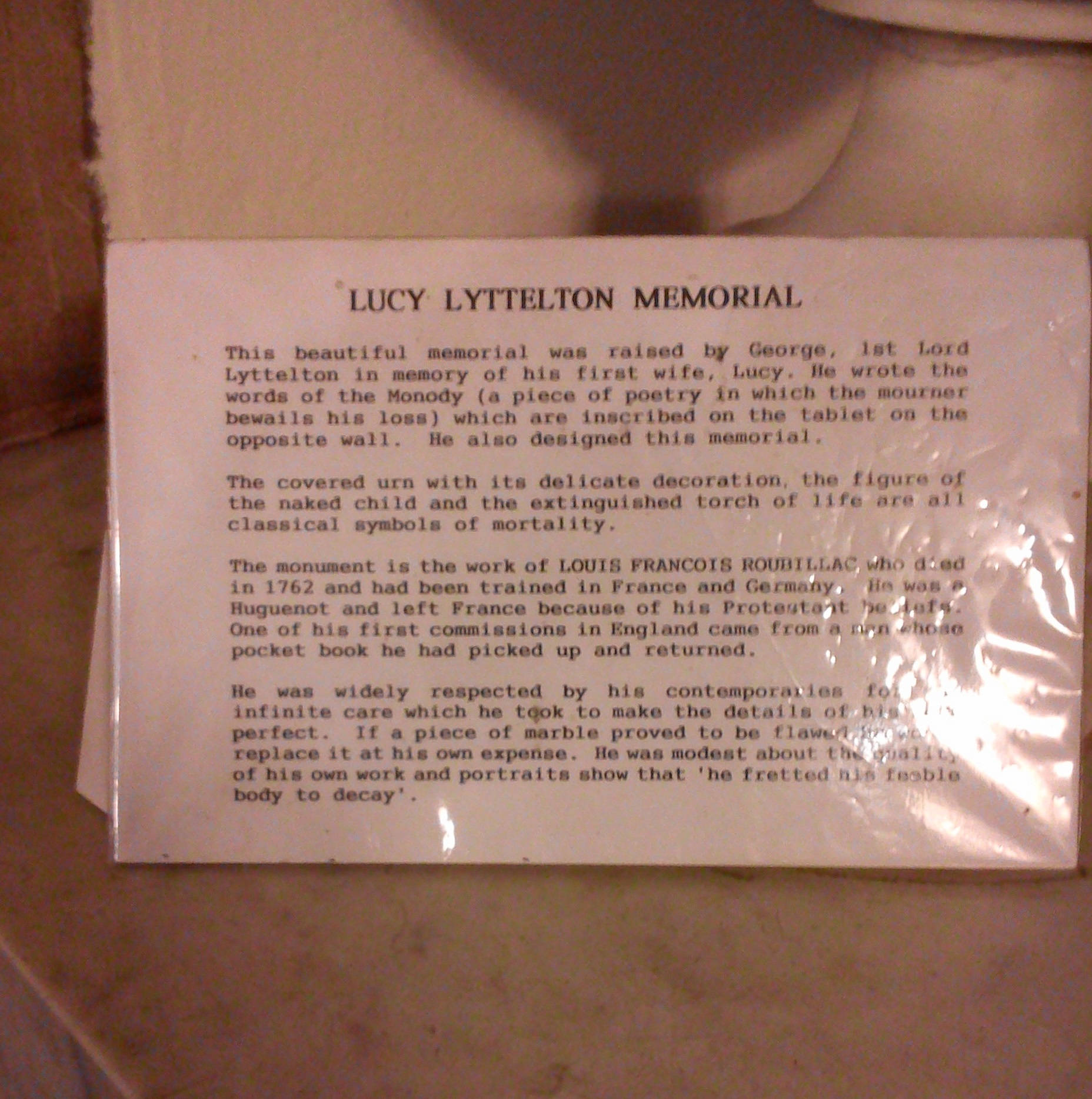
St John the Baptist Church, Hagley, information panel at statue to Lucy Lyttelton (née Fortescue, died 1747)

Parliament of England
| Preceded by Charles Trevanion; Charles Porter | Member of Parliament for Tregony; 1689–1695; With: Charles Boscawen 1689; Robert Harley 1689–1690; Sir John Tremayne 1690–1694; The Earl of Kildare 1694–1695 | Succeeded by Francis Robartes; James Montagu |
| Preceded by John Tanner; John Buller | Member of Parliament for Grampound; 1695–1698; With: John Tanner | Succeeded by John Tanner; Sir William Scawen |
| Preceded by Francis Robartes; Philip Meadowes | Member of Parliament for Tregony with Francis Robartes; 1701–1702 | Succeeded by Hugh Boscawen; Joseph Sawle |
| Preceded by Renatus Bellott; Francis Basset | Member of Parliament for Mitchell; 1705–1707; With: Sir William Hodges, Bt | Succeeded by Parliament of Great Britain |
Parliament of Great Britain
| Preceded by Parliament of England | Member of Parliament for Mitchell; 1707–1710; With: Sir William Hodges, Bt | Succeeded by Abraham Blackmore; Richard Belasyse |
| Preceded by Francis Robartes; Horatio Walpole | Member of Parliament for Lostwithiel; 1710–1713; With: John Hill | Succeeded by Sir Thomas Clarges, Bt; Erasmus Lewis |
