= Thomas Eyre (divine) =

Thomas Eyre (1748–1810), was a Catholic theologian. A graduate of the English College, Douai, he became the first president of St. Cuthbert's College at Ushaw.

== Life ==
Thomas Eyre, the fourth son of Nathaniel and Jane Broomhead Eyre, was born in 1748 at Glossop, Derbyshire. On 24 June 1758, he, with his brothers Edward and John, arrived at Esquerchin, near Douai, the preparatory school for the English college. He entered Douai college in 1762. After being ordained priest in 1775, he was retained at the college as general prefect and master of the classes known as rhetoric and poetry.

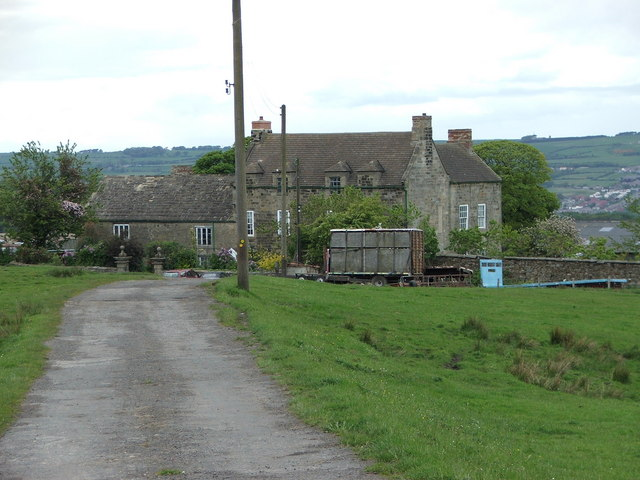
Pontop Hall Farm

In 1775 he returned to England and was placed in charge of the congregation on the Stella estate in the parish of Ryton, Durham. The mission territory covered the area west of Newcastle to Hexham. He began in 1791 to collect materials for a continuation of Dodd's "Church History of England," but the destruction of the English Catholic establishments abroad called him to a more active life and prevented him from proceeding with the work. About 1792 he was appointed to the mission of Pontop Hall, an old mansion belonging to the Swinburne family, near Lanchester, Durham.

In 1794 William Gibson desired him to take charge of the Northern students who had been expelled from Douai, and who were then temporarily at Tudhoe under John Lingard, who later became a famous historian, and who had not yet been ordained priest. Eyre relocated Lingard and his students to Pontop Hall. In October 1794, the school moved to Crook Hall, where Eyre became president of the new college. The John Daniel, president of Douay College, arrived at Crook Hall in the following year, and by virtue of his office assumed the charge of the students. Though he was willing to resign this post in favour of Daniel, this suggested arrangement came to nothing and Eyre remained president. A few days afterwards, Daniel resigned. The institution flourished under Eyre's management.

In 1803 an estate called Ushaw was bought by Gibson, and here, early in 1804, the new college was begun, and in July, 1808, Eyre began to remove his community thither. On 2 August he himself entered and the transfer of St. Cuthbert's College from Crook Hall to Ushaw was complete. Eyre died at Ushaw in 1810, leaving a considerable sum to the college for professorships and burses. Upon the death of Eyre, Lingard, having continued as vice-president, governed the college,

== Works ==
He published:

- The Instruction of Youth in Christian Piety, Newcastle, 1783, 2 vols. 8vo, a translation from the French of Charles Gobinet
- An edition of John Goter's Spiritual Works, Newcastle, 1790, 16 vols. 12mo.

His manuscript collections, in 2 vols. 4to, for a continuation of Dodd's "Church History" are preserved at Ushaw College.
