= John Shafto (MP) =

John Shafto (c. 1693 – 1742), of Whitworth Hall, County Durham, was a British lawyer and Tory politician who sat in the House of Commons from 1730 to 1742.

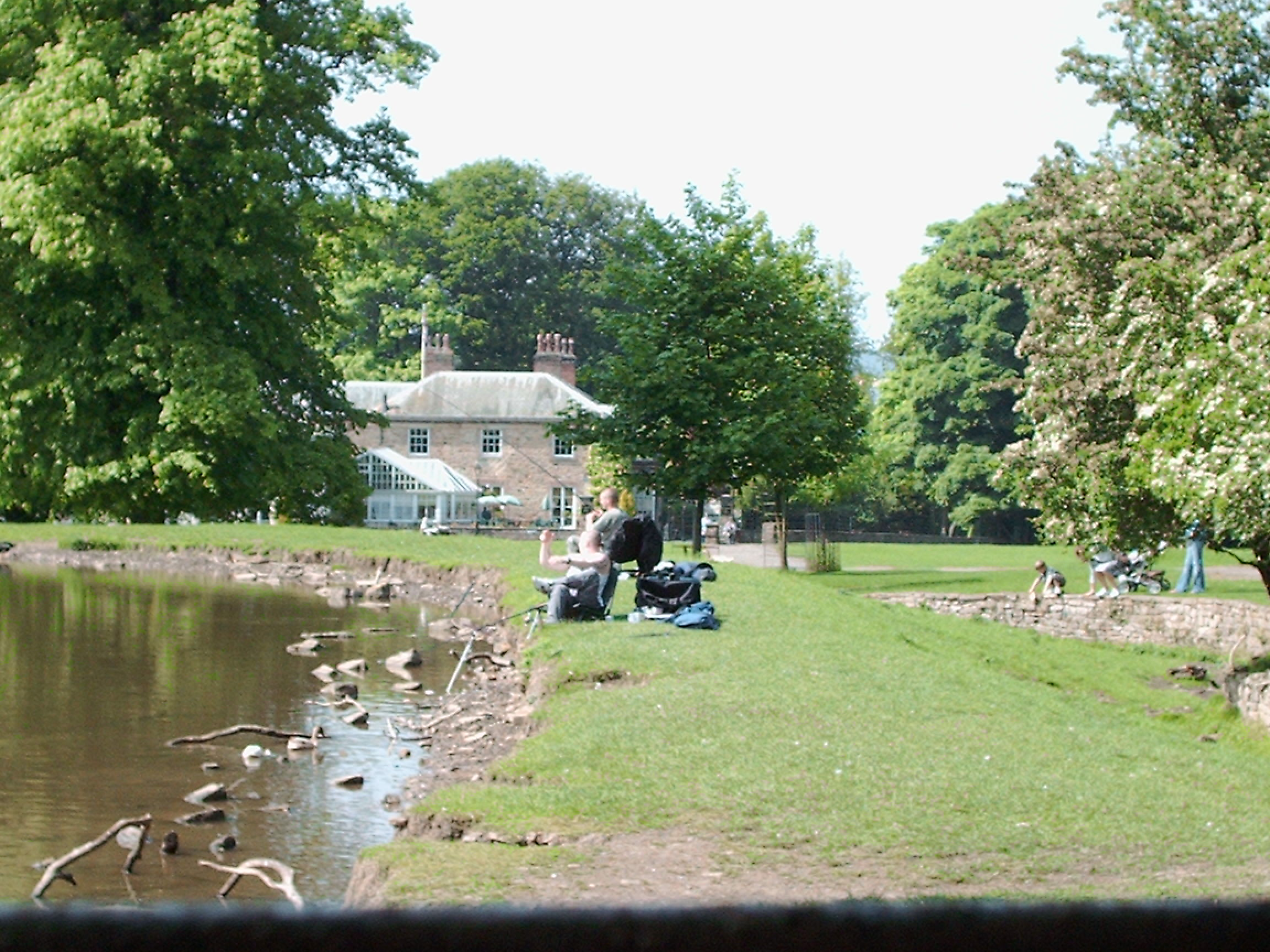
Whitworth Hall and deer park

Shafto was the second son of Mark Shafto of Whitworth and his wife Margaret Ingleby, daughter of Sir William Ingleby, 2nd Baronet of Ripley, Yorkshire. He matriculated at Lincoln College, Oxford on 9 May 1710, aged 16. He was admitted at Lincolns Inn on 22 December 1711 and was called to the bar in 1718. In 1719, he succeeded his brother Robert Shafto to the family seat at Whitworth. He married Mary Jackson, daughter of Thomas Jackson of Nunnington, Yorkshire on 20 May 1731.

Shafto was returned as Tory Member of Parliament for City of Durham in succession to his brother at a closely contested by-election on 26 January 1730. He was returned unopposed at the 1734 British general election and again at the 1741 British general election. He voted against the Government in all known occasions.

Shafto died on 3 April 1742 leaving two sons and two daughters, and was buried at St Andrews Churchyard, Holborn. He was succeeded by his son Robert (Bobby Shafto).

He was the brother-in-law of Sir John Eden, 2nd Baronet.

Parliament of Great Britain
Preceded by Robert Shafto; Charles Talbot	Member of Parliament for City of Durham; 1730–1742; With: Charles Talbot 1730–1734; Henry Lambton 1734–1742	Succeeded by John Tempest; Henry Lambton
