= Sir Richard Vyvyan, 3rd Baronet =

English politician and Jacobite (1681–1724)

Sir Richard Vyvyan of Trelowarren, 3rd Baronet (28 September 1681 – 12 October 1724) was an English Tory politician and a prominent Jacobite in Cornwall. He was arrested and briefly imprisoned by the British government during the Jacobite rising of 1715.

== Early life ==
Richard Vyvyan was born in Colan, Cornwall, the son of Charles Vyvyan of Merthen Manor and Mary Erisay. His father was a younger son of the Royalist politician, Sir Richard Vyvyan, 1st Baronet. Vyvyan was educated at Exeter College, Oxford and trained in law at the Middle Temple. He took a fellowship at Exeter College in 1696, but resigned it in 1697 after succeeding to the title and Cornish estates of his uncle, Sir Vyell Vyvyan, 2nd Baronet.

== Political career ==
In February 1701, Vyvyan was elected (on petition) to the House of Commons of England as a Member of Parliament for Mitchell. He openly opposed the government's preparations for war with France in the spring of that year. He was again returned as the member for Mitchell in December 1701, by which stage was identified as a Tory by Robert Harley. On 26 February 1702 Vyvyan voted for the motion vindicating the House of Commons' proceedings over the impeachment of William III's ministers. He did not stand in the 1702 English general election, but was returned to the Commons in a by-election in December 1703 to replace John Granville as the MP for Cornwall. In Parliament, Vyvyan became increasingly associated with High Tory politics and he was among the Tackers who in 1704 tried to attach ('tack') an Occasional Conformity Bill to money bills in order to pass it through the House of Lords and into law. On 21 February 1705 he was recorded as a teller in opposition to a clause prohibiting trade with France.

Between 1705 and 1708, Vyvyan had several periods of absence from the Commons, but continued to be recorded on contemporary lists as a Tory and High Church. On 7 January 1707 he opposed a motion for an additional financial settlement on John Churchill, 1st Duke of Marlborough. Despite having built an influential base of support in Cornwall, Vyvyan stood down at the 1710 British general election. However, he was active in his support for the two Tory candidates for the county and signed a circular letter in their support. That same year, he played a leading role in the Cornish Stannary Parliament in opposition to the influential Whig, Hugh Boscawen.

When George Granville, one of the successful Tory candidates from the 1710 election, was raised to the peerage in 1712, Vyvyan succeeded him as MP in a by-election and returned to the Commons. Around this time, Vyvyan was estimated to have three parliamentary seats under his patronage – two for Mitchell and one for Helston. In 1713, he spoke in favour of the French commerce bill, defending the Peace of Utrecht and describing it as "admirably calculated for the advantage of England". He stood down for a third time at the 1713 British general election, but was again active in the Tory campaign in Cornwall. He failed to secure a candidacy at the 1715 British general election after being frustrated in his efforts to stand in Helston by the borough's Whig mayor.

== Jacobite rising of 1715 ==
Following the death of Anne, Queen of Great Britain in 1714, Vyvyan was repeatedly identified in government reports as a High Tory opposed to the Hanoverian succession and the new regime. A Jacobite rising was launched in Scotland by the Earl of Mar on 27 August 1715. The Duke of Ormonde and Viscount Bolingbroke intended this to be complemented by popular risings across South West England, including Cornwall. In early September, Vyvyan was arrested on suspicion of high treason as the government rounded up alleged Jacobites to preemptively stop any rising in Cornwall. Contemporary reports from informants stated that Vyvyan was prepared to use his influence to rally support for James Francis Edward Stuart if an uprising or Jacobite landing occurred. However, firm evidence linking Vyvyan to the planned rebellion was never discovered, with local hearsay holding that Vyvyan burnt his personal papers before he was arrested. Despite the proclamation of "James III and VIII" at St Columb by James Paynter, Cornish Jacobites were bewildered by the arrest of the county leadership and the rebellion never materialised.

Vyvyan was taken to the Royal Citadel, Plymouth after the suspension of the Habeas Corpus Act 1679. There, he was held without trial, without being allowed to see the warrant under which he was committed, and was refused bail. On 8 October, he was taken to London where he was imprisoned in the Tower of London. His wife Mary joined him there and, while in the Tower, gave birth to a daughter. Vyvyan was eventually released without trial following the defeat of the main uprising in November 1715. In 1721, he was recorded in a letter from Lord Lansdowne as one of those thought likely by Jacobites to assist in the event of another rising. He died at Trelowarren on 12 October 1724.

== Marriage and issue ==
In 1697 he married a distant cousin, Mary Vivian, of Trewan Hall, St Columb Major, this uniting two branches of the family which had been separated for three centuries. His widow survived him by 32 years, dying in 1756. They had twelve children:

- Sir Francis Vyvyan, 4th Baronet (1698–1745, served as High Sheriff of Cornwall in 1739)
- Mary Vyvyan (1699–?)
- Anna Vyvyan (1700–?)
- Richard Vyvyan (1701–1771)
- Mary Vyvyan (1702–?)
- Reverend Charles Vyvyan (1704–1768)
- Loveday Vyvyan (1705–1784)
- Thomas Vyvyan (1706–?)
- Bridget Vyvyan (1707–?)
- Annabella Vyvyan (1709–1717)
- John Vyvyan (1710–?)
- James Vyvyan (1711–?)

Parliament of England
Preceded by William Beaw; Anthony Rowe	Member of Parliament for Mitchell; 1701–1702; With: William Beaw 1701; William Courtney 1701–1702	Succeeded by Renatus Bellott; Francis Basset
Preceded by John Granville; James Buller	Member of Parliament for Cornwall; 1703–1707; With: James Buller 1703–1705; Hugh Boscawen 1705–1707	Succeeded by Parliament of Great Britain
Parliament of Great Britain
Preceded by Parliament of England	Member of Parliament for Cornwall; 1707–1708; With: Hugh Boscawen	Succeeded by Hugh Boscawen; James Buller
Preceded by George Granville; John Trevanion	Member of Parliament for Cornwall; 1712–1713; With: John Trevanion	Succeeded by John Trevanion; Sir William Carew
Baronetage of England
Preceded by Vyell Vyvyan	Baronet (of Trelowarren); 1697–1724	Succeeded by Francis Vyvyan
