= Church in Danger =

Political slogan of the British Tory Party in the early 18th Century

"Church in Danger" was a political slogan used by the British Tory party, and particularly by High Tories in elections during Queen Anne's reign.

The slogan was a rallying call for many Anglicans in England who feared that the established Church of England was under attack by the policies of the Whigs, particularly the Toleration Act 1688. The Act allowed freedom of worship to Nonconformists i.e., Protestants who dissented from the Church of England such as Baptists and Congregationalists (but not to Catholics). Nonconformists were allowed their own places of worship and their own teachers, if they accepted certain oaths of allegiance.

To Tory supporters and High Church Anglicans such as Henry Sacheverell, such toleration would ultimately undermine the established church through reducing attendance and allowing sedition to be preached in England. The slogan proved to be effective and featured heavily in Tory election campaigns, particularly during the 1705 English general election which occurred in the midst of the Tackers controversy and the 1710 British general election where, in the context of the trial of Henry Sacheverell and the subsequent Sacheverell riots, the slogan contributed to a Tory landslide victory and enabled the passage of the Occasional Conformity Act 1711 to lock out non-conformists, though the act was repealed by the Whigs when they returned to power in 1719.
