= John Alleyn (barrister) =

17th-century English politician

John Alleyn or Allen (1 March 1621 – 26 June 1663) was an English barrister and Fellow of the Royal Society who also sat in the Convention Parliament from April to December 1660.

John Alleyn was probably the son of Giles Allen, Rector of Little Waltham, and his wife Elizabeth, daughter of William Massam. He was educated at Emmanuel College, Cambridge, where he matriculated in 1639, before being admitted to Gray's Inn in 1642.

He was returned as one of the Members of Parliament for St Michael, Cornwall in April 1660. He was elected a Fellow of the Royal Society in May, 1663 just before his death in Little Waltham, Essex.
