= Charles Talbot, 1st Baron Talbot =

Lawyer, politician and Lord High Chancellor of Great Britain (1685–1737)

The Right Honourable The Lord Talbot PC
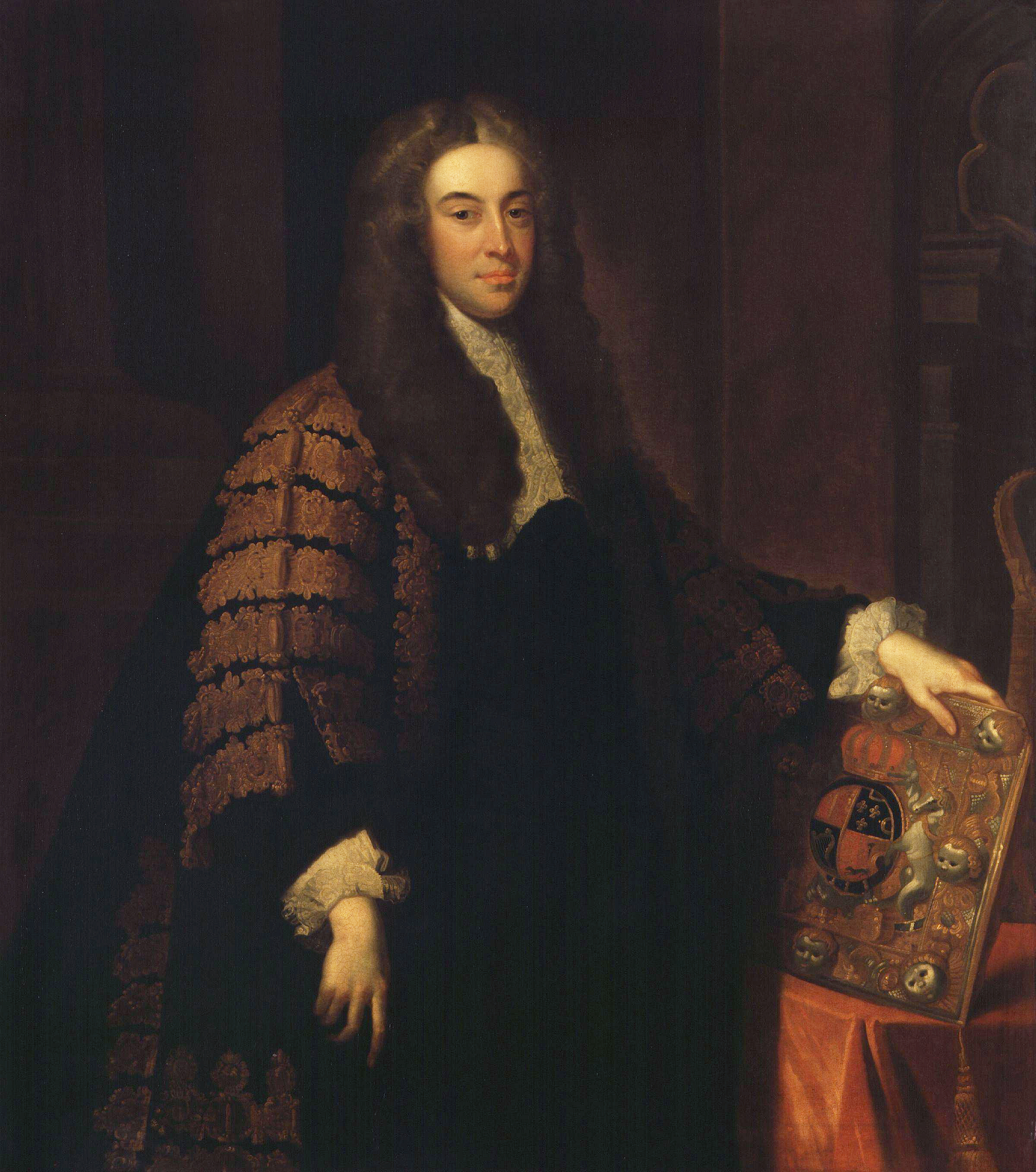
- Portrait by John Vanderbank

Lord Chancellor
- In office 29 November 1733 – 14 February 1737
- Monarch: George II
- Prime Minister: Sir Robert Walpole
- Preceded by: The Lord King
- Succeeded by: The Lord Hardwicke

Personal details
- Born: 1685
- Died: 14 February 1737 Lincoln's Inn Fields
- Education: Eton College
- Alma mater: Oriel College, Oxford

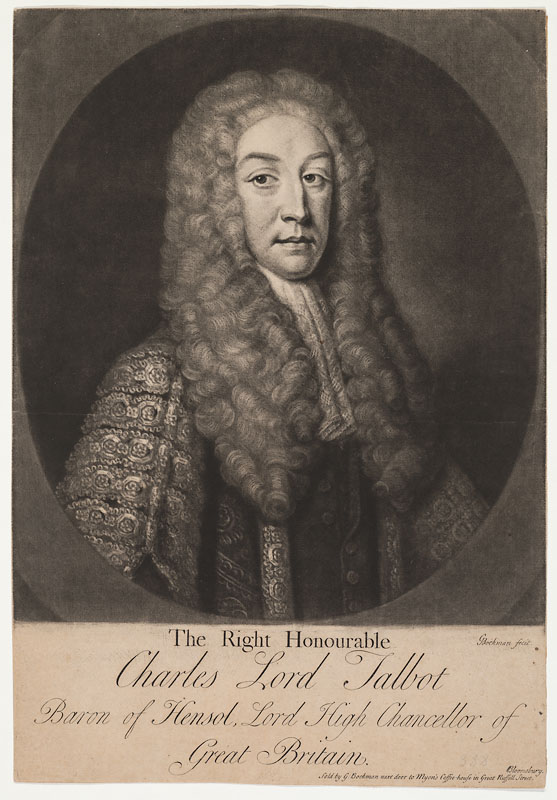
Lord Talbot by Gerhard Bockman.

Charles Talbot, 1st Baron Talbot, PC (1685 – 14 February 1737) was a British lawyer and Whig politician. He was Lord High Chancellor of Great Britain from 1733 to 1737.

== Early life ==
Talbot was the eldest son of Rt. Rev. William Talbot, Bishop of Durham, a descendant of the 1st Earl of Shrewsbury, and Catherine King.

He was educated at Eton and Oriel College, Oxford, and became a fellow of All Souls College in 1704.

== Career ==
He was called to the bar in 1711, and in 1717 was appointed solicitor general to the prince of Wales. Having been elected a member of the House of Commons in 1720, he became Solicitor General in 1726, and in 1733 he was made Lord Chancellor and raised to the peerage with the title of Lord Talbot, Baron of Hensol, in the County of Glamorgan.

Talbot proved himself a capable equity judge during the three years of his occupancy of the Woolsack. Among his contemporaries he enjoyed the reputation of a wit; he was a patron of the poet James Thomson, who in The Seasons commemorated a son of his to whom he acted as tutor; Joseph Butler dedicated his famous Analogy to Talbot, as was Upton's edition of Epictetus. The title he assumed derived from the Hensol estate in Pendoylan, Glamorgan, which came to him through his wife.

Talbot is remembered as one of the authors of the Yorke–Talbot slavery opinion, as a crown law officer in 1729. The opinion was sought to determinate the legality of slavery; Talbot and Philip Yorke opined that it was legal. The opinion was relied upon widely before the decision of Lord Mansfield in Somersett's Case.

== Personal life ==
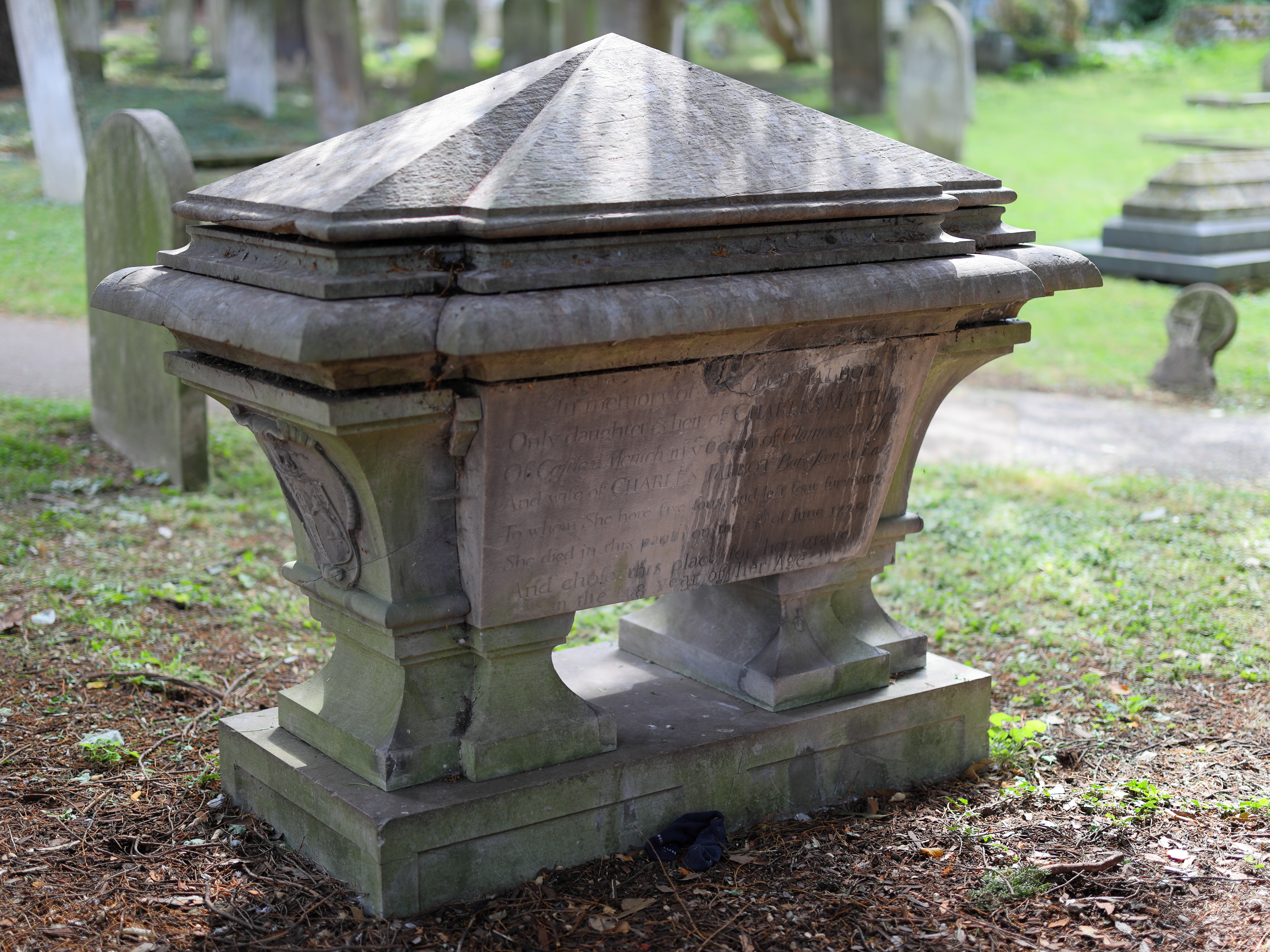
The tomb of Cecil Talbot, née Matthew.

Talbot married, in the summer of 1708, Cecil Mathew (d. 1720), daughter of Charles Mathew of Castell y Mynach, Glamorganshire, and granddaughter and heiress of David Jenkins of Hensol. There he built a mansion in the Tudor style, known as the Castle. They had five sons, of whom three survived him:

- William Talbot, 1st Earl Talbot (1710–1782), who married Mary de Cardonnel, daughter of Rt. Hon. Adam de Cardonnel, in c. 1733.
- Hon. John Talbot (d. 1756), who married Henrietta Maria Decker, daughter of Sir Matthew Decker, 1st Baronet, in 1737. After her death, he married Hon. Catherine Chetwynd, daughter of John Chetwynd, 2nd Viscount Chetwynd, in 1748.
- Rev. Hon. George Talbot (d. 1782), who married Hon. Anne Bouverie, daughter of Jacob Bouverie, 1st Viscount Folkestone. They had four children, but only their sons lived to adulthood one of which was the Ver. Rev. Charles Talbot.

After an illness during which the King and Queen enquired after his health every day, Talbot died on 14 February 1737 at his home in Lincoln's Inn Fields. He was succeeded in the title by his second son, William (1710–1782).

== Notes ==
Parliament of Great Britain
Preceded by Sir Edmund Prideaux; James Craggs	Member of Parliament for Tregony; 1720–1722; With: James Craggs to 1720; Daniel Pulteney 1720 – March 1721; John Merrill from March 1721	Succeeded by James Cooke; John Merrill
Preceded by George Baker; Thomas Conyers	Member of Parliament for City of Durham; 1722–1734; With: Thomas Conyers to 1727; Robert Shafto 1727–1730; John Shafto from 1730	Succeeded by Henry Lambton; John Shafto
Legal offices
Preceded by Clement Wearg	Solicitor General for England and Wales; 1726–1733	Succeeded by Dudley Ryder
Political offices
Preceded by The Lord King	Lord High Chancellor of Great Britain; 1733–1737	Succeeded by The Lord Hardwicke
Peerage of Great Britain
New creation	Baron Talbot; 1733–1737	Succeeded by William Talbot
