= Richard Belasyse =

English lawyer and politician (1670–1729)

Richard Belasyse (c. 1670 – 1729) was an English lawyer and Tory politician.

== Biography ==
Belasyse was the only son of William Belasyse of Owton by his second wife, Catherine Brandling. In 1681 he inherited an estate encumbered with debts and in 1693 he released all of his rights in Owton to his uncle, Sir Henry Belasyse. Belasyse was educated at three of the inns of court, leaving Middle Temple in 1689, Inner Temple in 1696 and Lincoln's Inn in 1699. He subsequently established a legal practice in London.

In 1702, he stood for election in Morpeth but was unsuccessful. He was returned as a Member of Parliament for Mitchell in the 1710 British general election, and by 1711 he was aligned with the Tory members investigating the mismanagements of the previous Whig ministry. He voted reliably with Harley ministry until 1713, when he appears to have become disillusioned with the government. At the 1713 British general election, he was dropped as the Tory candidate in Mitchell in favour of his uncle, who was returned as MP. Belasyse died in 1729, being buried at Hampstead on 14 May.

Parliament of Great Britain
Preceded by Sir William Hodges, Bt; Hugh Fortescue	Member of Parliament for Mitchell with Abraham Blackmore; 1710–1713	Succeeded by Sir Henry Belasyse; John Statham
