= William Russell (Mitchell MP) =

English Tory politician (1643–1705)

Sir William Russell

Member of Parliament for Mitchell
- In office 1681–1681

Personal details
- Born: 1643
- Died: June 10, 1705 (aged 61–62)

Sir William Russell (1643 – 10 June 1705) was an English Tory politician and liveryman.

== Biography ==
Russell was the fourth son of a London merchant, Robert Russell (died 1663), and Elizabeth Eaton. He entered professional life as his father's apprentice and was admitted to the Worshipful Company of Skinners in 1664. Following his apprenticeship, he became a draper and opened a successful shop on Lombard Street, London. He served as a common councilman on the Court of Common Council between 1675 and 1679. Unlike most members of his company, Russell was a supporter of the court faction and he was knighted by Charles II on 20 October 1679 in recognition of his loyalty.

He was twice married, firstly to Susan Palmer and secondly to Mary Woods. He had six children, Elizabeth (b. 1669), Susan (b. 1670), William (b. 1672), Anne (b. 1673), Daniel (b. 1674) and Robert (b. 1677).

At the 1681 English general election, Russell was returned as a Tory Member of Parliament for Mitchell, despite having no previous connection to the constituency or Cornwall. He was appointed to no committees and made little impact in the Oxford Parliament. He was appointed to several local offices, including as a deputy lieutenant and a commissioner for assessment in Middlesex. He was one of the jurors chosen by the Tory sheriffs for the trial of Henry Cornish for high treason. In 1686 he was made an alderman of the City of London by James II, but he was one of the Tories dismissed in June of the following year. He stood unsuccessful to represent London at the 1695 English general election as a Tory. By 1701, Russell had been appointed a justice of the peace for Essex, where he had an estate at Stubbers. He had bought the Manor of Stubbers in 1689 and subsequently bought additional land in Little Thurrock and East Tilbury.

Russell "was on friendly terms with King Charles II, to whom he lent large sums of money, and as Charles had a short memory where his debts were concerned, Russell who was a man of resource approached Nell Gwynn and offered her 100 guineas if she would extract the money from the King. Nell undertook the commission, but King Charles was quick to see from which quarter the wind blew. 'Tell me Nell,' said he 'how much has he offered you?' 'Just 100 guineas,' replied Nell. 'Well I'll give you 200 to say no more about it.'"

Parliament of England
Preceded by Sir John St Aubyn, Bt; Walter Vincent	Member of Parliament for Mitchell with Henry Vincent; 1681	Succeeded by Thomas Price; John Vivian
