= Abraham Blackmore =

English Tory politician (1677–1732)

Abraham Blackmore (c. 1677 – 18 May 1732) was an English lawyer and Tory politician.

== Biography ==
Blackmore was the second son of Thomas Blackmore and Elizabeth Meredith. His father was a member of the Court of Common Council in London and a distant relation of Richard Blackmore. Blackmore was educated at Sherborne School and Trinity College, Cambridge, before being admitted to train in law at the Inner Temple in 1694. He was called to the bar in 1700.

At the 1710 British general election, Blackmore was elected as a Member of Parliament for Mitchell in Cornwall. He became an early member of the Tory October Club and in the Commons he was among the Tory members investigating the mismanagements of the previous Whig ministry. He was a loyal supporter of the Harley ministry and on 18 June 1713 he voted in favour of engrossing the French commerce bill. At the 1713 British general election, Blackmore was elected to represent Newton on the ministry's interest. He subsequently made little impact in the Commons and stood down at the 1715 British general election; he does not appear to have been a candidate at any subsequent election. He died in Fleet Prison on 18 May 1732 having committed suicide by cutting his own throat.

Parliament of Great Britain
Preceded by Sir William Hodges, Bt; Hugh Fortescue	Member of Parliament for Mitchell with Richard Belasyse; 1710–1713	Succeeded by Sir Henry Belasyse; John Statham
Preceded by John Ward; Thomas Legh	Member of Parliament for Newton with John Ward; 1713–1715	Succeeded by Sir Francis Leicester, Bt; William Shippen
