= Elemore Hall =

- Location in County Durham

General information
- Location: County Durham, England, UK
- Coordinates: 54.792°N 1.455°W
- OS grid: NZ351442

Elemore Hall is a mid-18th-century country house, now in use as a residential special school, near Pittington, County Durham, England. It is a Grade I listed building.

== History ==
The manor of Elemore was owned prior to the Dissolution of the Monasteries by the Priory of Finchale. It was sold to Bertram Anderson, Mayor and Sheriff of Newcastle upon Tyne, who built a manor house in about 1550. The estate passed from Anderson to Hall and then by marriage to Thomas Conyers MP for Durham City 1702-22. In about 1700 Elizabeth Conyers, heiress of the estate, married George Baker, also MP for Durham City, of Crook Hall, near Lanchester.

== Structure ==
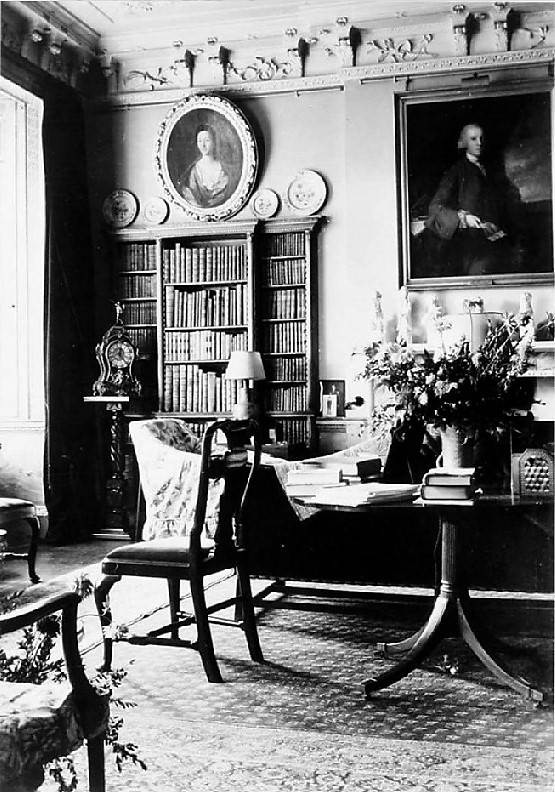
The library, before 1947

Their son George Baker inherited the manor in 1723 and in about 1750 replaced the old manor house with the present mansion to a design by architect Robert Shout of Hemsley. The house follows the E-plan of the old manor but on a much grander scale. The three storey, seven bayed entrance front has a pedimented three bayed projecting central block and two flanking and projecting pedimented single bay wings. It is a Grade I listed building.

== Baker family ==
In 1844 Isabella Baker heiress married the son of her aunt and first cousin, Henry Tower. On inheriting the property he changed his name to Henry Baker Baker. He was High Sheriff of Durham in 1854. The Baker Baker family lived at the Hall until the 1930s.

== School ==
In 1947 the estate was bought or leased to Durham County Council. S.E.D. Wilson, the vice chairman of the Northern Coal Divisional Board, said, "The estate was formerly leased by a colliery company to protect themselves against claims for subsidence ... The Hall is not convenient for use as area headquarters ... but it might be suitable as a school for other educational purposes". The Hall has since then been occupied by a local education authority day and residential special school. In 1992 a new teaching block, designed by Thomas Weatherald of Askrigg, was planned at a cost of £357,546 (equivalent to £788,952 in 2025).

In 1959 Elemore Hall School headmaster, Alan Little, was cleared of excessively and publicly injuring a disabled pupil by hitting him with a slipper, in spite of school staff, a senior inspector of the N.S.P.C.C. and two doctors noting "excessive bruises". The defence counsel, Peter Taylor, submitted that, "It is a very odd piece of corporal punishment that doesn't hurt – that is what it is meant to do". The boy, Michael John Paxton, was aged 12 years.
