= John Lingard =

English Roman Catholic priest and historian (1771–1851)

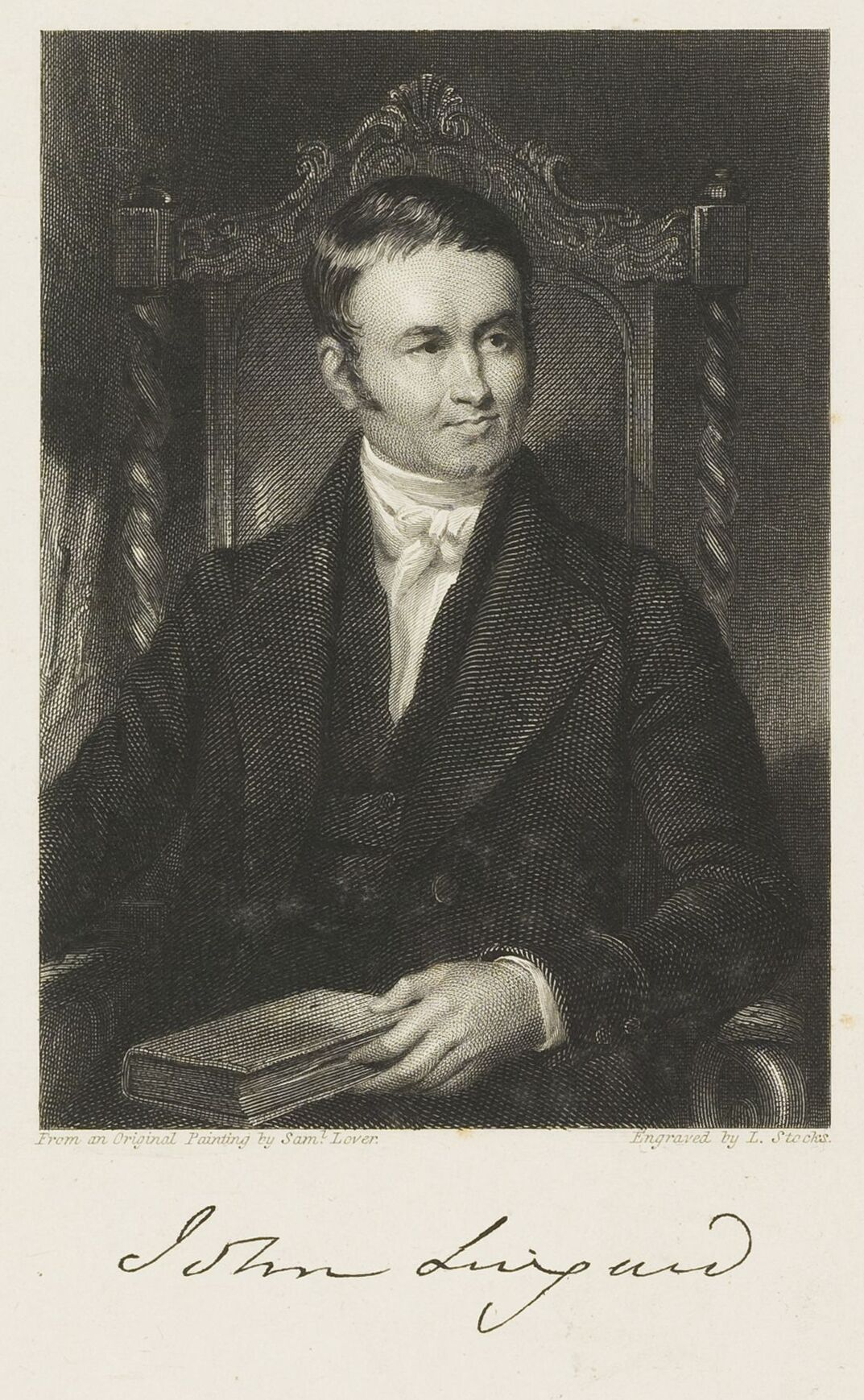
- Born: 5 February 1771; St. Thomas Street, Winchester, England
- Died: 17 July 1851 (aged 80)

Academic work
- Discipline: English history
- Institutions: English College, Douai; Crook Hall; St. Cuthbert's College

John Lingard (5 February 1771 – 17 July 1851) was an English Catholic priest and historian, the author of The History of England, From the First Invasion by the Romans to the Accession of Henry VIII, an eight-volume work published in 1819. Lingard was a teacher at the English College at Douai, and at the seminary at Crook Hall, and later St. Cuthbert's College. In 1811 he retired to Hornby in Lancashire to continue work on his writing.

Though Lingard was accorded no recognition by the British intellectual establishment and is no longer popular as an historian, his contribution to historical method came at a critical point in British intellectual history. That he was also a Catholic priest, in a turbulent time for the Church in England, makes that contribution all the more interesting.

== Biography ==
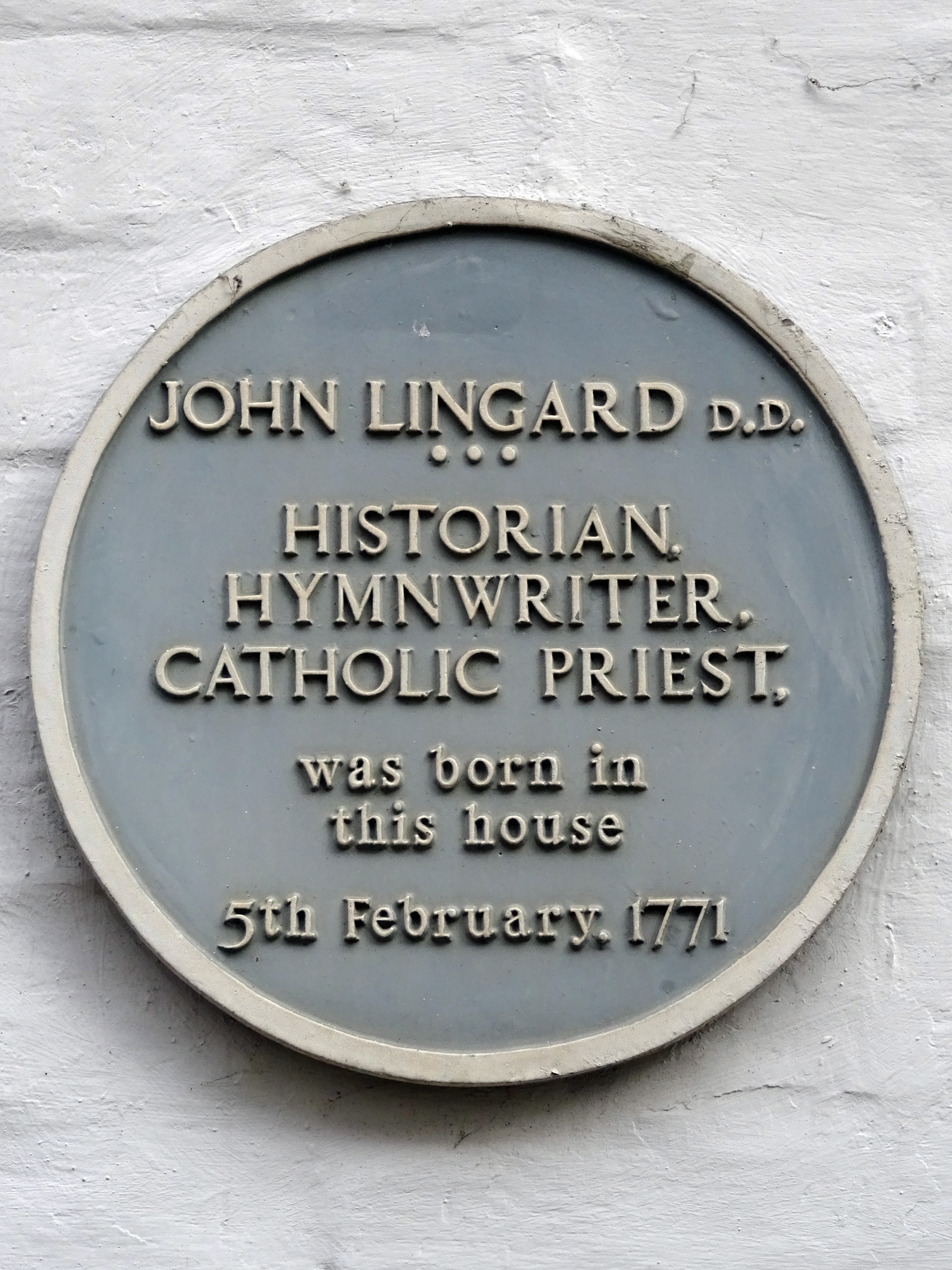
Place of birth of Lingard in Winchester

Born in 1771 in St Thomas Street in central Winchester to recusant parents, John Lingard was the son of John and Elizabeth Rennell Lingard. His mother was from an old Catholic family who had been persecuted for their beliefs; his father was, by trade, a carpenter, who had converted to Catholicism upon his marriage. They each migrated from their native Claxby in Lincolnshire, first to London, where they met once again and married, then, after a short return to their old home, to Winchester, where he was born.

Bishop Challoner recommended the young John Lingard for a burse at the English College at Douai, France. He entered the college in September 1782, to commence training for the priesthood. At the English College, he excelled in the humanities before beginning the study of theology. At the end of his course in philosophy he was retained as professor of grammar at one of the lower schools. Narrowly escaping attacks by mobs at the time of the French Revolution upon the declaration of war between the Kingdom of Great Britain and France, he returned to England in 1793 in charge of two brothers named Oliveira and of William, afterwards Lord Stourton. For nearly a year, he was tutor to young Stourton at Baron Stourton's residence near York.

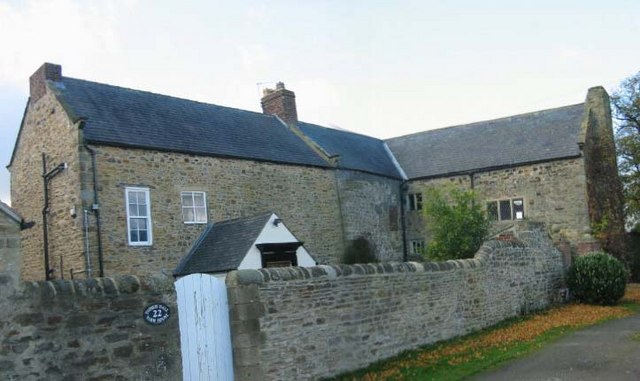
Tudhoe Old Hall

When Lingard learned that a number of his students from Douai had made it to Arthur Storey's school in Tudhoe, he asked leave of the Baron to join them, which was granted.

In 1792 Thomas Eyre was appointed to the mission of Pontop Hall, near Lanchester, County Durham. In 1794 Bishop William Gibson asked Eyre to take charge of the Northern students who had been expelled from Douai, and who were then temporarily at Tudhoe under John Lingard. Eyre relocated Lingard and his students to Pontop Hall, and then later to Crook Hall, all within a few miles of Durham. Nominally Lingard held the chair of philosophy; practically, besides the duties of vice-president to Eyre, he undertook in addition those of prefect of studies, procurator, and of professor of Church history.

Lingard concluded his theological studies and was ordained at York in April 1795. In 1805, he wrote a series of letters which, after their publication in a periodical, were collected as Catholic Loyalty Vindicated. In 1806 the first edition of The Antiquities of the Anglo-Saxon Church appeared, a development of his informal lectures. He remained at Crook Hall for fourteen years until, in 1808, the seminary moved to St. Cuthbert's College. Lingard donated a stained glass window to St. Cuthbert's Chapel at Ushaw.

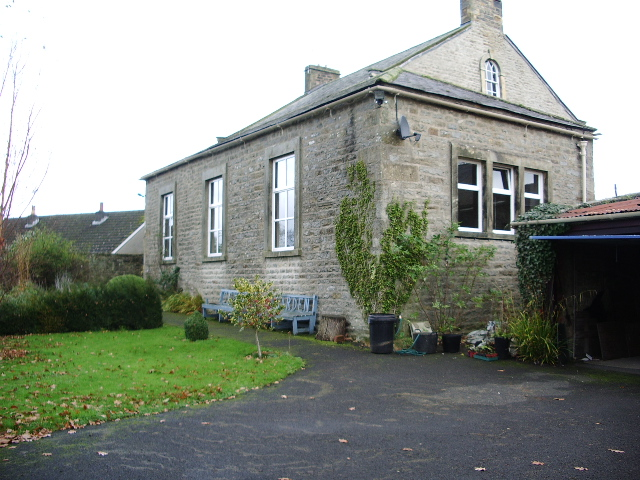
St Mary's Catholic Church, Hornby

Upon the death of Eyre in 1810, Lingard, having continued as vice-president, governed the college, at the same time teaching theology. In 1811, he retired to take charge of the secluded mission at Hornby, in Lancashire, spending most of the rest of his life there. Devoting himself to his study and writing, he was well liked as a quiet and gentle man by the residents. He was offered the presidency of St Patrick's College, Maynooth and of Old Hall Green, but declined both.

In 1819, the first three volumes of The History of England was published. Volume I was originally intended as textbook for schools. In 1821, Pope Pius VIII created Lingard a doctor of Divinity. A fourth volume followed in 1823, bringing the history up to the reign of Edward VI. He built St. Mary's Church with the proceeds from volume IV of the History of England. Lingard would refer to it in jest as "Henry VIII's Chapel". (The church is a Grade II listed building.) When he traveled to Rome for research in 1825, Pope Leo XII presented him with a gold medal. Subsequent volumes appeared at intervals until he completed the work in 1849.

Lingard died at Hornby on 17 July 1851 at the age of eighty-one. He was buried, at his request, in the cloister of the college cemetery at Ushaw.

== Writing ==
=== The Antiquities of the Anglo-Saxon Church ===
The Antiquities of the Anglo-Saxon Church arose from a series of informal talks Lingard gave at Ushaw. They were compiled and edited, and published at Newcastle in 1806. Lingard emphasized that he drew his information wherever possible from original works. He demonstrated that the church in England grew contemporaneously with expanding political structures, and that the institutional structure of the church planted by Augustine of Canterbury developed within the politico-social environment of the Anglo-Saxon kingdoms. Lingard argued that "...By preserving the use of the Latin tongue, they imposed on the clergy the necessity of study, kept alive the spirit of improvement, and transmitted to future generations the writings of the classics, and the monuments of profane and ecclesiastical history." In his discussion of saints and their holy books, Lingard implies a continuity between the Anglo-Saxon Christians and the English Roman Catholics of his own day, some of whom retained custody of the ancient manuscripts. The section regarding Ecgberht of Ripon, Willibrord, and Boniface suggests that a number of practices and traditions many of his contemporaries would regard as "Romish" were actually exported to the continent by Englishmen. By drawing a connection between Anglo-Saxon Christians and nineteenth century Roman Catholics he sought to show that the latter were not only good Christians, but also good and loyal Englishmen.

=== The History of England ===
The principal object of his major work, The History of England, is to emphasise the disastrous effects of the Reformation. A substantial scholarly work which gave full treatment to the history of England, the book was later expanded by the author and the title changed to reflect the period covered. As each additional volume appeared the History's reputation increased, while Lingard continued to revise and improve the whole work. Most of the earnings from this project and his other writings were directed towards the educating of students to the priesthood.

In his style and presentation of English history, Lingard demonstrates the prevalent manner of Catholic scholarship – he gives, for example, no indication that he is a priest on the title page, and professes emphatically to be writing an impartial history. But in a curious turnaround, his History by its very impartiality is a Catholic apologetic, and Lingard's desire for impartiality is a reflection of the Catholic political and intellectual situation in the Emancipation era.

The Catholic position in the early nineteenth century, politically speaking, was that of a minority body, allied to the Whig-Radical-Dissenting political grouping, and seeking religious and political freedom. This alliance encouraged Old Catholic intellectuals to present their arguments in 'liberal' and 'reasonable' form – the argumentative advantage in this being that it presented Catholics as enlightened and tolerant, and their opposition as prejudiced and bigoted.

Lingard himself argued that one of his chief duties as an historian was:

"to weigh with care the value of the authorities on which I rely, and to watch with jealousy the secret workings of my own personal feelings and prepossessions. Such vigilance is a matter of necessity to every writer of history ... Otherwise, he will be continually tempted to make an unfair use of the privilege of the historian; he will sacrifice the interests of truth to the interests of party, national, or religious, or political." (J. Lingard, "History of England", vol 1, 6th edition, London: Charles Dolman, 1854, p. 6.)

Lingard adopted a non-controversial and sober approach to history with the emphasis on incontrovertible fact and using primary rather than secondary sources. In the History, Lingard faces the task of convincing Protestants of the fundamental truths of the Catholic faith, while maintaining an unbiased presentation of historical truth. He possesses little sense of "preaching to the converted" (in a very literal sense), and aims his work more at influencing Protestants than placating his Ultramontane opposition. In a letter of 18 December 1819, Lingard wrote: "... my only chance of being read by Protestants depends upon my having the reputation of a temperate writer. The good to be done is by writing a book which Protestants will read." (Lingard to Kirke, in Haile, Bonney, Life and Letters of John Lingard, 1771–1851, London: 1912, pp 166–67).

Lingard's History is also an apt demonstration of the advantages a Catholic historian of the time may have had, in terms of impartiality. Lingard's religion had to a large extent isolated him from the mainstream nationalism which surrounded Protestant historians, as well as from the growing "providentialist" concept of history. Lingard's strength of argument, however, continued to be popular, and the influence of Protestant animosity for Catholic apologetic also led him to develop a keen critical judgement. He was devoted to absolute accuracy and detail and the History was a groundbreaking work in its use of primary sources. Lingard made extensive use of Vatican archives and French, Italian, Spanish and English dispatches, document collections and state papers – the first British historian to do so. The peripheral nature of English Catholicism put him in a position of "outside observer" to much of English intellectual culture, and this is reflected in his historical works. Despite this distancing effect, however, Lingard maintained an active interest in politics all his life and was a noted pamphleteer.

The edition that is usually seen is a 10 volume set, "to the Accession of William and Mary in 1688." There is an enlarged 13 volume set published just before Lingard's death which was his final revision, "to the Commencement of the Reign of William the Third." The History was abridged and revised adding material to bring its treatment up to the then present and used as a text in English Catholic schools during the nineteenth century.

William Cobbett also used the work as an unbiased reference source for his own History of the Protestant Reformation in which he puts forward the argument that the reformation had disastrous consequences for the ordinary people of England. His work would in turn be influential in the passage of the Catholic emancipation bill (Roman Catholic Relief Act 1829) by preparing the way for public acceptance and the minimisation of sectarian violence.

=== Gospel translation ===
Lesser known than Lingard's historical works is his anonymously published translation of the Four Gospels in 1836. The title page reads simply that the work is "by a Catholic." Lingard departed from usual Catholic practice by using early Greek manuscripts rather than the Latin Vulgate as the principal basis for the translation. This resulted in such renderings as "repent" rather than "do penance" (Matt 3:2). His willingness to depart from Catholic custom contrasts with his contempt for the Protestant concept of "private interpretation" of Scripture. In a note to John 1:1, he states, "Hence it happens that men of every persuasion find confirmation of their peculiar opinions in the sacred volumes: for, in fact, it is not the Scripture that informs them, but that they affix their own meaning to the language of Scripture."

The work influenced Francis Patrick Kenrick (1796–1863), Roman Catholic Bishop of Philadelphia, and later Archbishop of Baltimore, who published his own translation of the Four Gospels in 1849. By 1851, Lingard felt sufficiently confident to publish a new edition of his Four Gospels in his own name.

=== Hymn ===
Lingard also authored the very popular Catholic hymn to the Virgin Mary titled Hail Queen of Heaven, the Ocean Star, loosely based on the medieval Latin plainchant Ave maris stella. J. Vincent Higginson described it as "one of the oldest English vernacular hymns commonly found in Catholic hymnals."

== Honours ==
In 1821 Pope Pius VII honoured Lingard with a triple doctorate – in theology, canon law and civil law – and a few years later Leo XII conferred upon him a gold medal generally only given to cardinals and princes. There is even strong evidence that he was made a cardinal in pectore ("in the breast") in 1826. This meant that the Pope could have announced the appointment publicly at some future time.
