= Henry Belasyse (died 1717) =

British army officer and politician (1648–1717)

Sir Henry Belasyse
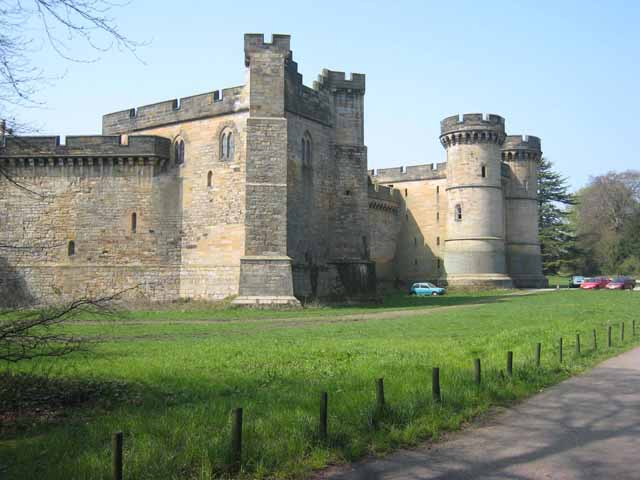
- Brancepeth Castle, purchased by Belasyse in 1701

Member of Parliament for Mitchell
- In office November 1713 – January 1715

Member of Parliament for City of Durham
- In office November 1710 – February 1712

Member of Parliament for City of Durham
- In office December 1701 – 1708

Member of Parliament for Morpeth
- In office 1695 – November 1701

Member of Parliament for Galway Town
- In office 1693–1695

Personal details
- Born: Henry Belasyse; 1648 Biddick Hall, County Durham
- Died: 14 December 1717 (aged 69) London
- Resting place: Westminster Abbey
- Spouse(s): (1) Dorothy Benson 1680-1696 (2) Fleetwood Shuttleworth 1709
- Education: Christ's College, Cambridge
- Occupation: Soldier and politician

Military service
- Allegiance: Dutch Republic (1674–1688); England
- Years of service: 1674–1702
- Rank: Lieutenant-general
- Unit: 6th Foot 1674–1688; 22nd Foot, 1689–1701; 2nd Foot 1701–1703
- Commands: Governor of Galway 1691–1692; Governor of Berwick 1713–1715
- Battles/wars: Franco-Dutch War; Cassel; Saint-Denis; Williamite War in Ireland; The Boyne; Aughrim; Nine Years' War; Landen Namur 1695; War of the Spanish Succession; Battle of Cádiz (1702)

Sir Henry Belasyse (1648 – 14 December 1717) was a British army officer and politician from County Durham who sat as MP for a number of constituencies between 1695 and 1715. Beginning his military career in 1674 under William of Orange, he proved an effective soldier who was trusted with a variety of senior commands, but was unpopular with his contemporaries. In the Glorious Revolution of November 1688, he helped secure the north of England for William, before fighting in Ireland and Flanders in the 1688 to 1697 Nine Years War.

During the War of the Spanish Succession in 1702, he was held responsible for the looting that followed the Battle of Cádiz, an event seen as having badly damaged the House of Habsburg cause. As a result, he was dismissed from the army in 1703; he never held active command again, although he was appointed Governor of Berwick-upon-Tweed from 1713 to 1715. First returned to Parliament for Morpeth in 1693, he began his political life as a Whig, but was elected for Durham in 1701 with Tory support. He was MP for Durham from 1701 to 1708, and from 1710 to 1712, then for Mitchell, in Cornwall from 1713 to 1715; he did not stand in the 1715 election. He died in London on 14 December 1717 and was buried in Westminster Abbey.

== Personal details ==
Henry Belasyse was born in 1648, at Biddick House in County Durham, son of Sir Richard Belasyse (1612–1651) of Potto, North Yorkshire, and his second wife, Margaret (d. after 1670). He had an elder half brother William, who died in 1681 and a sister, Catherine.

The Belasyse were a prolific family, long-established in Durham and Yorkshire; his paternal grandfather, Sir William, was High Sheriff of Durham from 1625 to 1640. Unlike many of his relatives, his father favoured Parliament in the Wars of the Three Kingdoms and emerged with his estates largely intact. The majority backed Charles I of England, including Viscount Fauconberg (1577–1653) and Lord John Belasyse (1614–1689). His maternal grandfather, Sir William Lambton, was also a Royalist, killed at the Battle of Marston Moor in 1644.

In 1680, Belasyse married Dorothy Benson (1636–1696), a widow and mother of the politician Robert Benson, Baron Bingley; they had three children, Mary, Thomas and Elizabeth, all of whom predeceased their father. In 1707, he married Fleetwood Shuttleworth (1676–1732); they had two children, Margaret, who died young and William (1697–1769).

== Military career ==
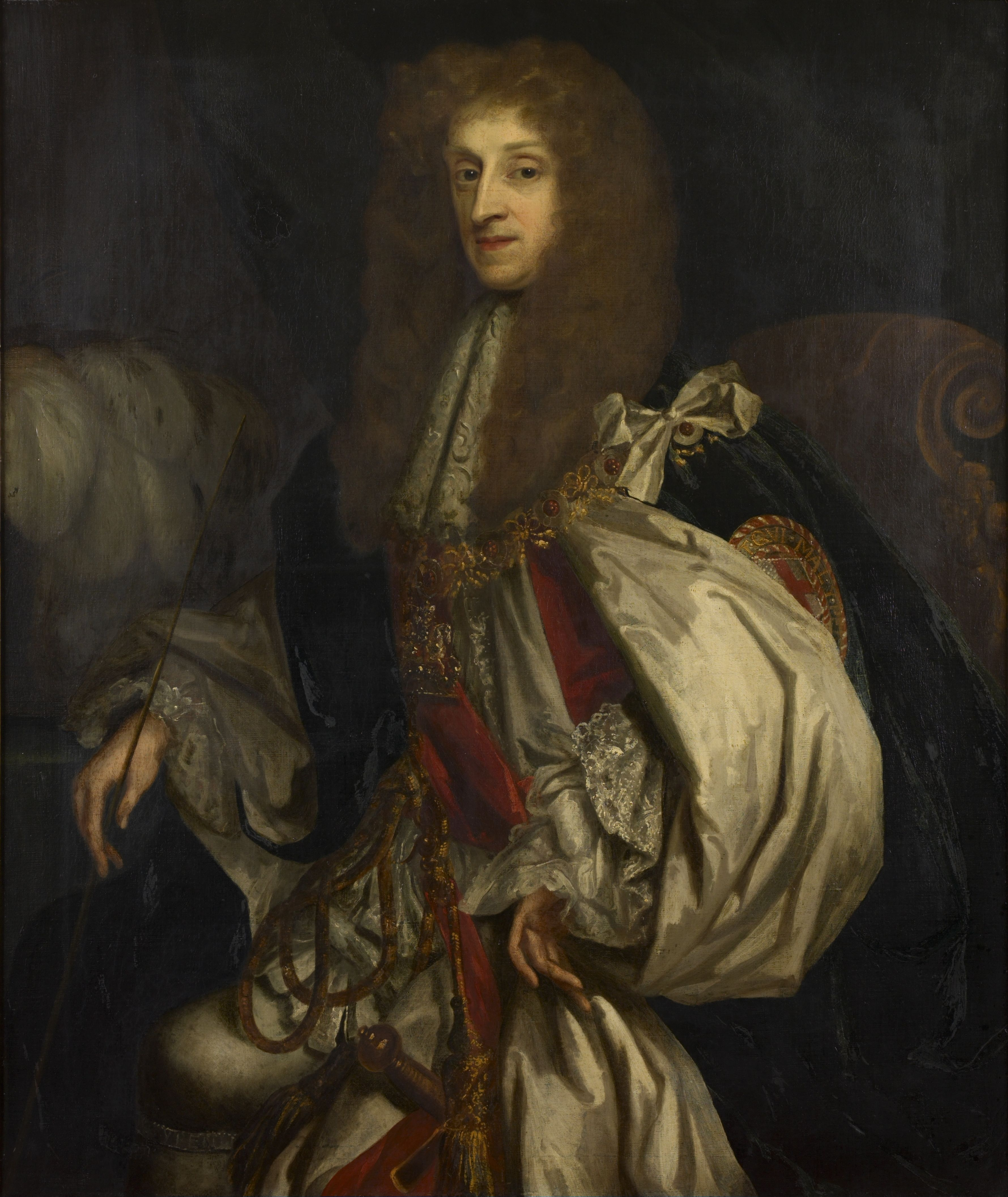
Thomas, Lord Danby; during the 1688 Glorious Revolution, Belasyse helped him secure the north for William of Orange

Belasyse graduated from Christ's College, Cambridge, in 1667, before a period spent at legal school in the Middle Temple, then considered part of a gentleman's education. In 1674, he raised a company of men for the Scots Brigade, a mercenary unit in the Dutch States Army, whose origins went back to the 1580s, which normally contained three Scots and three English regiments. The latter were withdrawn in 1672 when England allied with France in the 1672–1678 Franco-Dutch War but restored after the 1674 Treaty of Westminster ended their involvement. Henry's company was recruited for one of the restored English regiments, which eventually became the 6th Foot.

He fought at Cassel in 1677 and shortly afterwards replaced Thomas Ashley as Colonel of the regiment. Wounded at Saint-Denis in 1678, the final battle in the Franco-Dutch War, he was knighted at some point between 1678 and 1681. He accompanied the Brigade when William of Orange sent it to England in 1685 to help James II suppress the Monmouth Rebellion, although it returned in August without seeing action. In early 1688, James demanded the repatriation of the entire Brigade; William refused to comply but used the opportunity to remove officers of doubtful loyalty.

For reasons that are unclear, Belasyse fell out of favour with William; he returned to England in April 1688 and his unit taken over by Philip Babington. He returned to Yorkshire, where he became a close associate of Lord Danby, a moderate Tory and one of the signatories of the 1688 Invitation to William, asking him to assume the English throne. After William landed at Torbay on 5 November 1688, Belasyse was part of a force under Danby that secured first York, the most important city in Northern England, then Hull, its largest port.

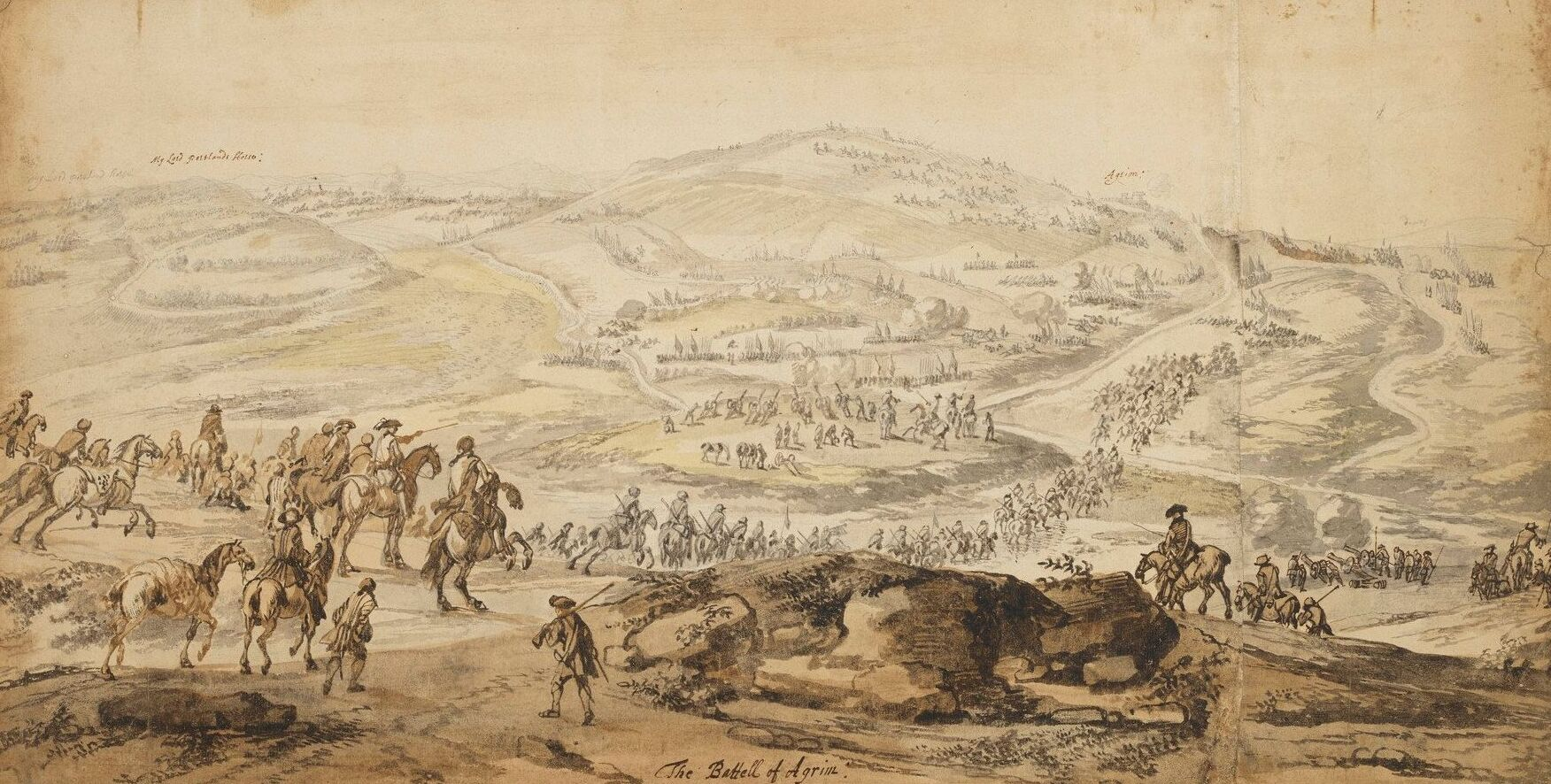
The Battle of Aughrim, which Belasyse took part in

He was rewarded with promotion to brigadier general in April 1689 and in September appointed Colonel of a Regiment of Foot. which took part in the 1689–1691 Williamite War in Ireland, including The Boyne, Aughrim and Limerick in August 1691. After Galway surrendered on 26 July, Belasyse was appointed governor and awarded estates in County Kerry confiscated from their previous Jacobite owners. He was also elected in 1692 as MP for Galway Town in the Parliament of Ireland, although he was on active service in Flanders during his tenure.

While in London in early 1691, he was badly injured in a duel with Colonel Richard Leveson, allegedly over an incident in Ireland. Although duelling was common in this period, Belasyse does not seem to have been popular, Marlborough describing him as 'not loved but is a good officer.' Prince George of Hesse-Darmstadt, who also served in Ireland, described him as 'mediocre and avaricious'; on the other hand, Sir Henry was consistently promoted by William, who was generally reluctant to have English officers in senior commands, regarding them as less trustworthy or competent than the Dutch or Germans.

With the war in Ireland at an end, Henry transferred to Flanders to fight in the Nine Years War and was given command of a brigade; at the Battle of Landen in 1693, he and Thomas Tollemache managed to extract the defeated Allied infantry in good order. In October 1694, he was promoted to lieutenant-general and his brigade was part of Vaudémont's screening force during the 1695 Allied siege of Namur. The French commander Villeroy achieved local superiority over Vaudémont but their attack on 14 July failed to break his line; this allowed the Allies to conduct an orderly withdrawal, Belasyse helping cover the retreat. In October 1695, he supervised the court-martial of officers who had surrendered Diksmuide and Deinze; Ellenberg, commander at Diksmuide, was executed, eight others were dismissed.'

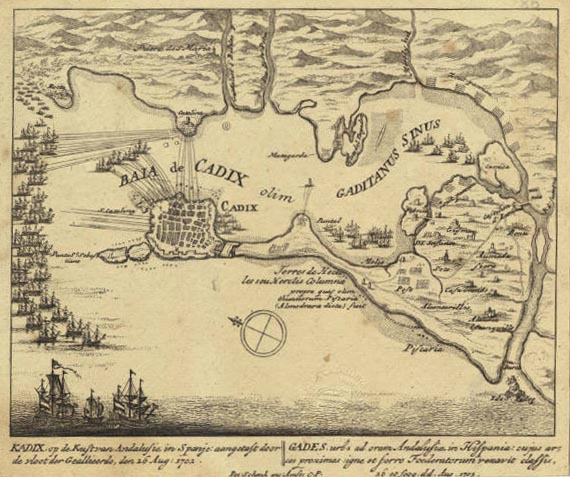
Battle of Cadiz (1702); held responsible for the looting that followed its capture, Belasyse was dismissed from the army in 1703.

The 1697 Treaty of Ryswick which ended the Nine Years' War left unresolved the question of who would succeed the ailing and childless Charles II of Spain, an issue that had dominated European politics for over 30 years; as a result, it was viewed by all sides as only a pause in hostilities. Despite this, the Tory majority in Parliament was determined to reduce costs and by 1699, the English military had been cut to less than 7,000 men. England, Ireland and Scotland were then separate entities with their own Parliaments and funding; to mitigate these cuts, a number of regiments were transferred onto the Irish military establishment, including Belasyse's regiment.

Just before the War of the Spanish Succession began in July 1701, Belasyse exchanged regiments with William Selwyn after his unit was assigned to Jamaica, a notoriously unhealthy posting and became Colonel of the 2nd Foot. Selwyn died of disease in April 1702, while Belasyse was appointed second-in-command to the Duke of Ormonde, commander of the Anglo-Dutch force sent to Spain in 1702 to support the Habsburg candidate, Archduke Charles. He and Major-General Charles O'Hara commanded the force that successfully seized Port St Mary in 1702; however, after its capture, the town was looted and burned.

Aware of the damage done to his cause, Archduke Charles demanded the commanders be punished, and in December, Queen Anne issued an order requiring the return of any plunder taken from Fort St Mary. O'Hara, a long-time client of the Ormonde family, was charged with failing to prevent the looting, and although censured, he retained his position and later became Lieutenant-General. Belasyse was accused of active participation; he claimed parliamentary immunity, but was dismissed from the army, ending his active military career.

== Political career and later life ==
In 1693, Belasyse purchased the estate of Owton in County Durham from his nephew Richard Belasyse. He was elected MP for the nearby constituency of Morpeth in 1695, generally voting with the Whigs. In 1701, he purchased Brancepeth Castle and was returned for the nearby seat of Durham in the November election with Tory support.

Although he did not stand in the 1708 election, he was once again returned for Durham in the Tory landslide of 1710. However, he was forced to resign as MP in 1712 after accepting a commission to investigate military expenditure in Italy and Spain; when this ended in early 1713, he replaced Richard Belasyse as MP for the rotten borough of Mitchell, in Cornwall. He was also appointed Governor of Berwick-upon-Tweed but like many Tories lost this position when George I became king in October 1714 and did not stand in the 1715 election. He died in London in 1717 and was buried in Westminster Abbey.

== Sources ==
- Cannon, Richard (1849). Historical Record of the Twenty-Second, or the Cheshire Regiment of Foot (2015 ed.). Andesite Press. ISBN 1296561828.
- Cannon, Richard (1838). Historical Record of the Second, or the Queen's Royal Regiment of Foot (2017 ed.). CreateSpace Independent Publishing Platform. ISBN 1977804209.
- Childs, John (1984). "The Scottish brigade in the service of the Dutch Republic, 1689 to 1782". Documentatieblad Werkgroep Achttiende Eeuw.
- Childs, John (2008). "Belasyse, Sir Henry; 1648–1717". Oxford Dictionary of National Biography (online ed.). Oxford University Press. doi:10.1093/ref:odnb/66560. (Subscription, Wikipedia Library access or UK public library membership required.)
- Childs, John (1991). The Nine Years' War and the British Army, 1688–1697: The Operations in the Low Countries (2013 ed.). Manchester University Press. ISBN 0719089964.
- Childs, John (1994). Chandler, David; Beckett, Ian (eds.). The Restoration Army 1660–1702 in The Oxford History of the British Army (1996 ed.). OUP. ISBN 0192803115.
- "Columbine's regiment of foot". The Spanish Succession.
- Cruickshanks, Evelyn; Hayden, D (2002). "Belasyse, Sir Henry (c.1648–1717), of Potto, Yorks. and Brancepeth Castle, Co. Durham". The History of Parliament: the House of Commons 1690–1715. Boydell & Brewer.
- Cruickshanks, Evelyn; Harrison, Richard (2002). "Belasyse, Richard (c.1670–1729), of Lincoln's Inn and Hampstead, Mdx". The History of Parliament: the House of Commons 1690–1715. Boydell & Brewer.
- Dalton, Charles (1904). English army lists and commission registers, 1661–1714, Volume V. Eyre & Spottiswoode.
- Francis, Alan David (1975). First Peninsular War, 1702–13. Ernest Benn Ltd. ISBN 0510002056.
- Gregg, Edward (1980). Queen Anne (Revised) (The English Monarchs Series) (2001 ed.). Yale University Press. ISBN 0300090242.
- Harris, Tim (2007). Revolution; the Great Crisis of the British Monarchy 1685–1720. Penguin. ISBN 978-0141016528.
- McGrath, Charles Ivar (2012). Ireland and Empire, 1692–1770 (Empires in Perspective). Routledge. ISBN 978-1851968961.
- Meerts, Paul Willem (2014). Diplomatic negotiation: Essence and Evolution (PHD). Leiden University. hdl:1887/29596.
- Plant, David. "Sir William Lambton's Regiment of Foot". BCW Project. Archived from the original on 27 September 2018.
- Unknown (1795). An Historical Account of the British Regiments Employed Since the Reign of Queen Elizabeth and King James I in the Formation and Defence of the Dutch Republic Particularly of the Scotch Brigade. T. Kay.

Military offices
Preceded by Thomas Ashley	Colonel of Belasyse's Regiment of Foot; 1678–1689	Succeeded by William Babington
Preceded by The Duke of Norfolk	Colonel of The Duke of Norfolk's Regiment of Foot; 1689–1701	Succeeded by William Selwyn
Preceded by William Selwyn	Colonel of the Queen Dowager's Regiment of Foot; 1701–1703	Succeeded by The Earl of Portmore
Civic offices
Preceded by Arthur French	Mayor of Galway; 1691–1692	Succeeded by Thomas Revett
Parliament of Ireland
Preceded by Oliver Martin; John Kirwan	Member of Parliament for Galway Town; 1692–1693; With: Nehemiah Donnellan	Succeeded by Richard St George; Robert Ormsby
Parliament of England
Preceded by George Nicholas; Roger Fenwick	Member of Parliament for Morpeth; 1695–1701; With: George Nicholas 1695–1698; Philip Howard 1698–1700; Sir Richard Sandford 1701	Succeeded by Emanuel Howe; Sir John Delaval
Preceded by Charles Montagu; Thomas Conyers	Member of Parliament for Durham; 1701–1707; With: Charles Montagu 1701–1702; Thomas Conyers 1702–1707	Succeeded by Parliament of Great Britain
Parliament of Great Britain
Preceded by Parliament of England	Member of Parliament for Durham; 1707–1708; With: Thomas Conyers	Succeeded by Thomas Conyers; James Nicolson
Preceded by Thomas Conyers; James Nicolson	Member of Parliament for Durham; 1710–1712; With: Thomas Conyers	Succeeded by Thomas Conyers; Robert Shafto
Preceded by Abraham Blackmore; Richard Belasyse	Member of Parliament for Mitchell; 1713–1715; With: John Statham	Succeeded by Nathaniel Blakiston; Robert Molesworth
