= Hodges baronets =

Extinct baronetcy in the Baronetage of England

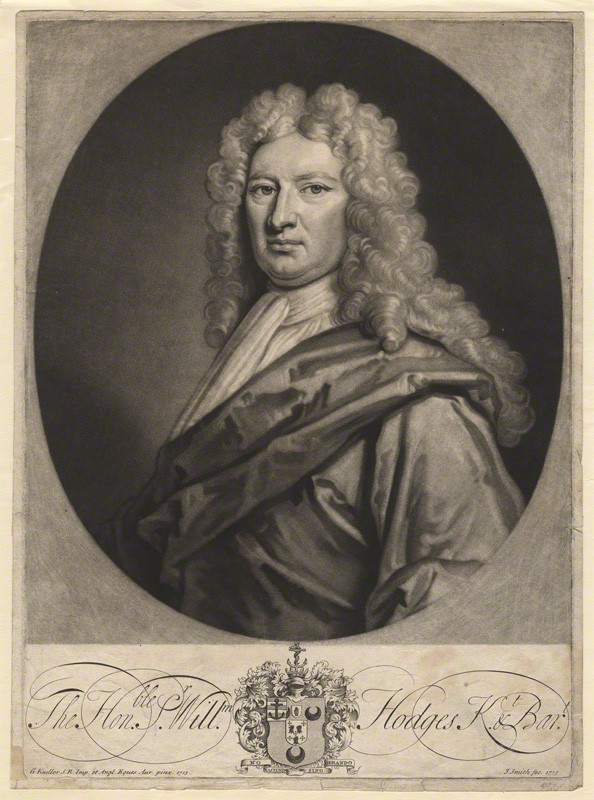
A 1715 engraving of Hodges by John Smith after Godfrey Kneller

The Hodges Baronetcy, of Middlesex, was a title in the Baronetage of England. It was created on 31 March 1697 for William Hodges, Member of Parliament for Mitchell. The title became extinct on the death of the second Baronet in 1722.

== Hodges baronets, of Middlesex (1697) ==
- Sir William Hodges, 1st Baronet (c. 1645–1714)
- Sir Joseph Hodges, 2nd Baronet (c. 1704–1722)
