= Stubbers =

Former country house in Essex, England

Coordinates: 51°32′18″N 0°16′02″E

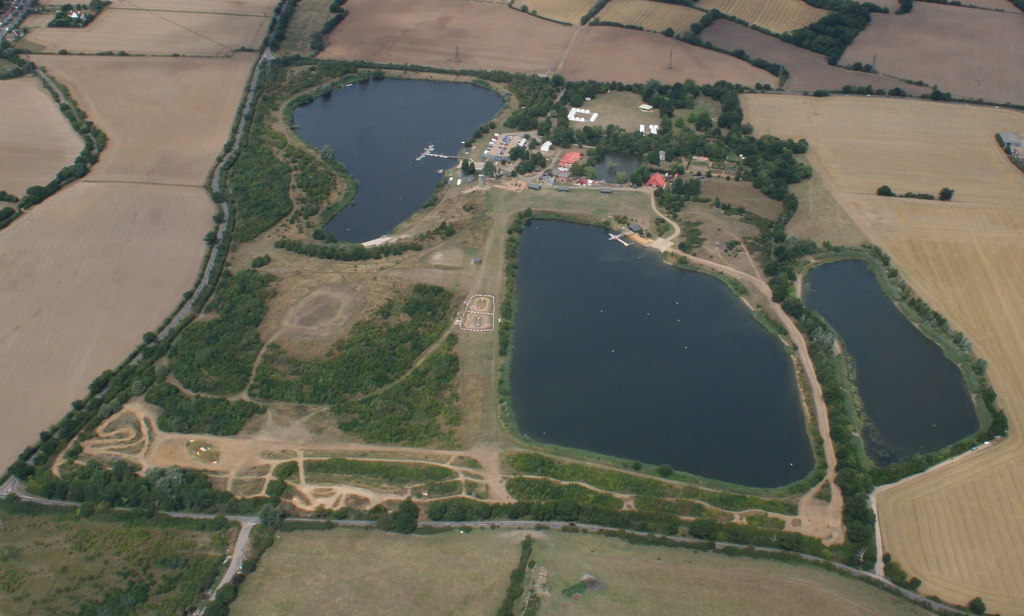
Stubbers grounds

Stubbers was a stately home in North Ockendon, Essex, England. The house was demolished in 1955 and the grounds became the Stubbers Activity Centre in 2011.

== History ==
The earliest reference to the estate subsequently known as Stubbers was in 1334. The name comes from William Stubber who owned the house in the 15th century. In the early 17th century it was the home of William Coys, a well known botanist, who established a walled garden that subsequently provided plants for the establishment of Kew Gardens. The garden contained 342 plant species and in 1604 a yucca plant bloomed there, for the first time in England. In the book Early English Botanists Coys is attributed with compiling a list of his plants for John Goodyer of Hampshire, this being described as the oldest known list of plants from an English garden giving their scientific names.

In 1689, the estate was bought by Sir William Russell, a London draper who included King Charles II among his acquaintances. Stubbers remained in the Russell family for nearly 300 years, and Humphry Repton was commissioned to suggest how the gardens could be landscaped for which he produced a "Red Book". On Repton's advice, the Coys garden was removed. Writing in 1951, before the house was demolished, Glynn Morgan described the southern facade as "attractive". To the east of the house was a dovecote with 662 nesting boxes.

== Current usage ==
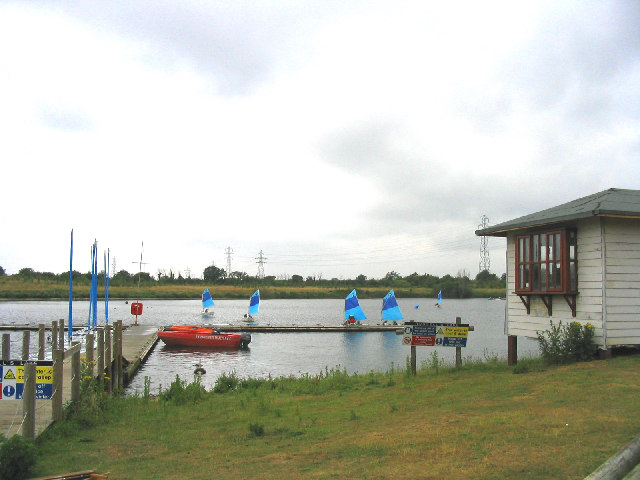
Russell's Lake at Stubbers Activity Centre

The house was demolished in 1955 and the grounds are now the site of an activity centre. A walled garden survives from the house, but its date is not known. In August 2011, it was announced that Havering Council had agreed to sell the land to the activity centre.
