= John Vivian (1647–1691) =

English Member of Parliament for Mitchell

John Vivian (31 October 1647 – May 1691) was an English lawyer and Tory politician.

== Biography ==
Vivian was the son of John Vivian (died 1696) of Trewan Hall. He was educated at Exeter College, Oxford and the Middle Temple, and was called to the bar in 1675. At the 1685 English general election, he was elected to the House of Commons of England as a Tory Member of Parliament for Mitchell. He sat on only one committee. He died in his father's lifetime and was buried in St Columb Major on 12 May 1691.

Parliament of England
Preceded by William Russell; Henry Vincent	Member of Parliament for Mitchell with Thomas Price; 1685	Succeeded by Viscount Fanshawe; Francis Vyvyan
