= Hugh Cartwright =

16th-century English politician

Hugh Cartwright (by 1526–1572), of London and West Malling, Kent, was an English politician.

== Life ==
Cartwright was the eldest son of Edmund Cartwright and Agnes Cranmer. Cartwright was the nephew of Thomas Cranmer, archbishop of Canterbury. He married Jane Newton. He had no issue, and his heir was William Cartwright, son of his brother Thomas.

== Career ==
Cartwright was a member of parliament for Mitchell in 1547, and of Rochester, Kent in 1558. He served under Edward VI, Mary I, and Elizabeth I, despite these monarchs' religious differences, and the execution of his uncle, Archbishop Cranmer, during the reign of Mary. He supported Mary against Wyatt's Rebellion, which started in Cartwright's home county of Kent.
