= Robert Shafto (1690–1729) =

British Tory politician

Robert Shafto (2 December 1690 – December 1729), of Whitworth Hall, Spennymoor, County Durham, was a British Tory politician who sat in the House of Commons between 1712 and 1729.

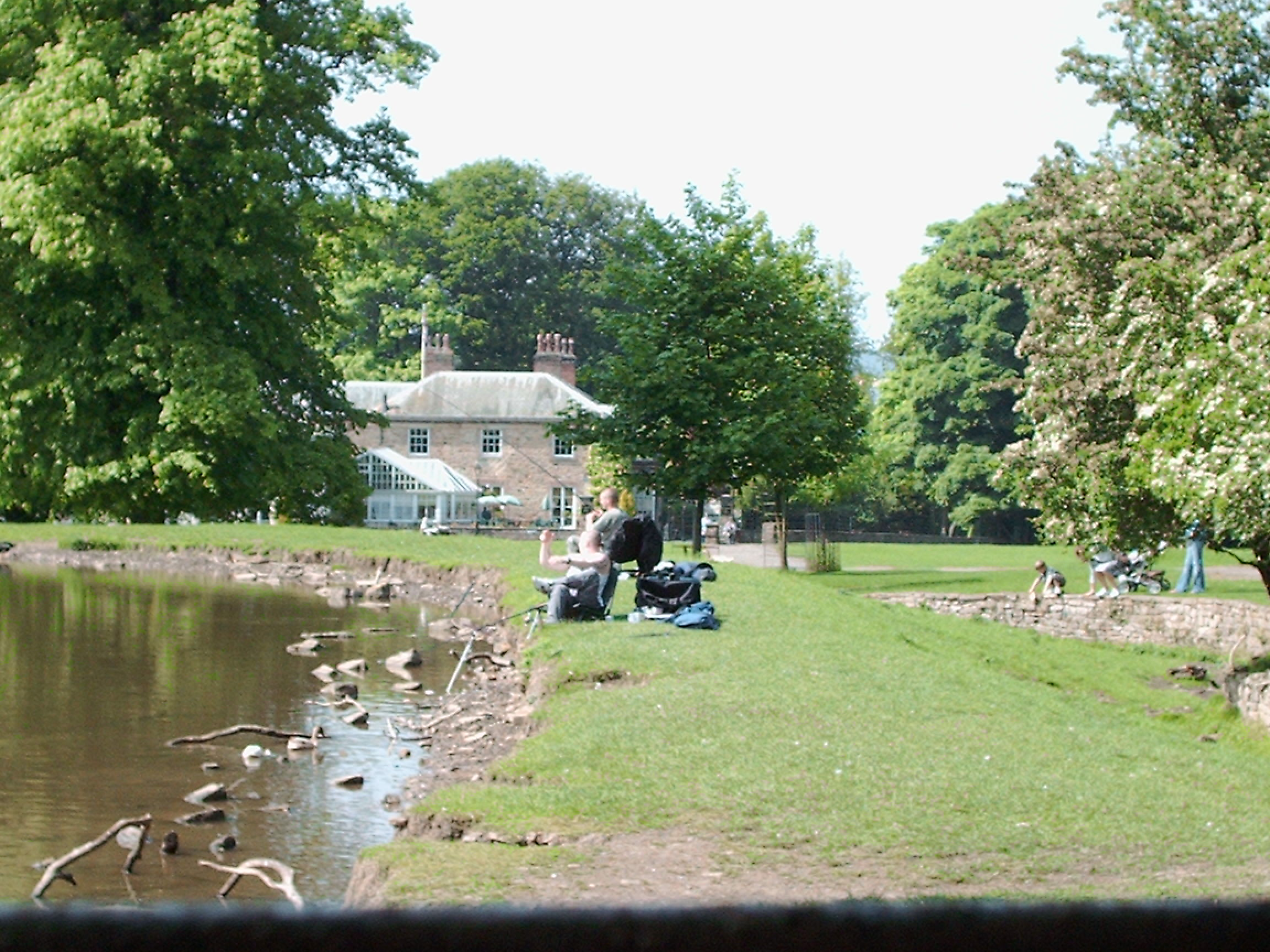
Whitworth Hall and deer park

Shafto was the eldest son of Mark Shafto of Whitworth and his wife Margaret Ingleby, daughter of Sir John Ingleby, 2nd Baronet of Ripley, Yorkshire. He matriculated at Lincoln College, Oxford in 1708.

Shafto was returned as Member of Parliament (MP) for the City of Durham at a by-election on 3 March 1712. On 10 April 1713 he was appointed to help prepare a bill making Stockton, Durham, a separate parish and on 18 June 1713 he voted against the French commerce bill. He did not stand at the 1713 British general election.

Shafto succeeded his father in 1723 and married Dorothy Dawnay, daughter of Henry Dawnay, 2nd Viscount Downe on 17 October 1723. He became a Freeman of Durham in 1726.

At the 1727 British general election, Shafto was returned unopposed as Tory MP for the City of Durham again.

Shafto died without issue in December 1729 and was succeeded by his brother John.

His Grandfather was also named Robert Shafto, Recorder of Newcastle and his great-grandfather of the same name was Sheriff of Newcastle. His Great-Great-Grandfather, Robert Eden, was Sheriff of Newcastle as well. His Great-Great-Great-Grandfather, Mark Shafto was Mayor of Newcastle.

== Sources ==
Parliament of Great Britain
Preceded by Thomas Conyers and Sir Henry Belasyse	Member of Parliament for City of Durham; 1712–1713; With: Thomas Conyers	Succeeded by Thomas Conyers and George Baker
Preceded by Thomas Conyers and Charles Talbot	Member of Parliament for City of Durham; 1727–1729; With: Charles Talbot	Succeeded by John Shafto and Charles Talbot
