= John Statham (died 1759) =

English Tory politician (1676–1759)

Sir John Statham (May 1676 – 1759) was an English Tory politician.

== Biography ==
Statham was the eldest son of Thomas Statham of Tansley and Tideswell in Derbyshire, and his first wife, Barbara, daughter of Cromwell Meverell. He was baptised on 18 May 1676. He entered Clement's Inn in 1691 and succeeded to his father's estate in 1702.

In 1708, he was granted the office of Surveyor General for the Duchy of Lancaster. In 1713 he was returned as the Member of Parliament for Mitchell on the interest of George Granville, 1st Baron Lansdowne. Between 1713 and 1714 Statham served as the British envoy to Duchy of Savoy in Turin. In May 1714 he was appointed a Gentleman of the Privy Chamber and on 18 June 1714 he was knighted by Anne, Queen of Great Britain in what was her final investiture ceremony before her death. He held the office until 1727. Statham made little impact at parliament, but was consistently recorded on Tory lists of members. He stood down at the 1715 British general election and did not seek re-election until 1727, when he was defeated in Lichfield. He was a justice of the peace and deputy lieutenant for Derbyshire. In 1757 he issued a broadside ballad complaining that the Whigs had heaped "wrong, injustice and oppression" upon him. He died in 1759 and was buried in Tideswell church.

Parliament of Great Britain
Preceded by Abraham Blackmore; Richard Belasyse	Member of Parliament for Mitchell with Sir Henry Belasyse; 1713–1715	Succeeded by Nathaniel Blakiston; Robert Molesworth
