= George Baker (died 1723) =

George Baker (died 1723) of Crook Hall, Lanchester and Elemore, county Durham, was a British landowner and Tory politician who sat in the House of Commons from 1713 to 1722.

Crook Hall

Baker was the only son of George Baker of Crook Hall and his wife Elizabeth Davison, daughter of Samuel Davison of Wingate Grange, county Durham. He was the nephew of Thomas Baker the antiquarian. He succeeded his father who died in 1699 and rebuilt Crook Hall. Before 1713, he married Elizabeth Conyers, daughter of Thomas Conyers of Elemore.

Baker was returned unopposed with his father in law as Member of Parliament for Durham City at the 1713 general election. They were both returned unopposed at the 1715 general election. He was a Tory and like his father in law voted against the administration. He did not stand at the 1722 general election.

Baker died, at Bristol, on 1 June 1723, and was buried at Lanchester on the 12 June. He and his wife had two sons and two daughters, but only one of each survived. Their son George was responsible for the rebuilding of Elemore Hall

Parliament of Great Britain
Preceded by Thomas Conyers; Robert Shafto	Member of Parliament for Durham City; 1713–1722; With: Thomas Conyers	Succeeded by Thomas Conyers; Charles Talbot
