= Mitchell (constituency) =

Former parliamentary constituency in the United Kingdom

- Former borough constituency for the House of Commons
- County: Cornwall
- Major settlements: St Newlyn East and St Enoder

1547–1832
- Seats: Two

Mitchell, or St Michael (sometimes also called St Michael's Borough or Michaelborough), was a rotten borough consisting of the town (or village) of Mitchell, Cornwall. From the first Parliament of Edward VI, in 1547, it elected two members to the unreformed House of Commons.

== History ==
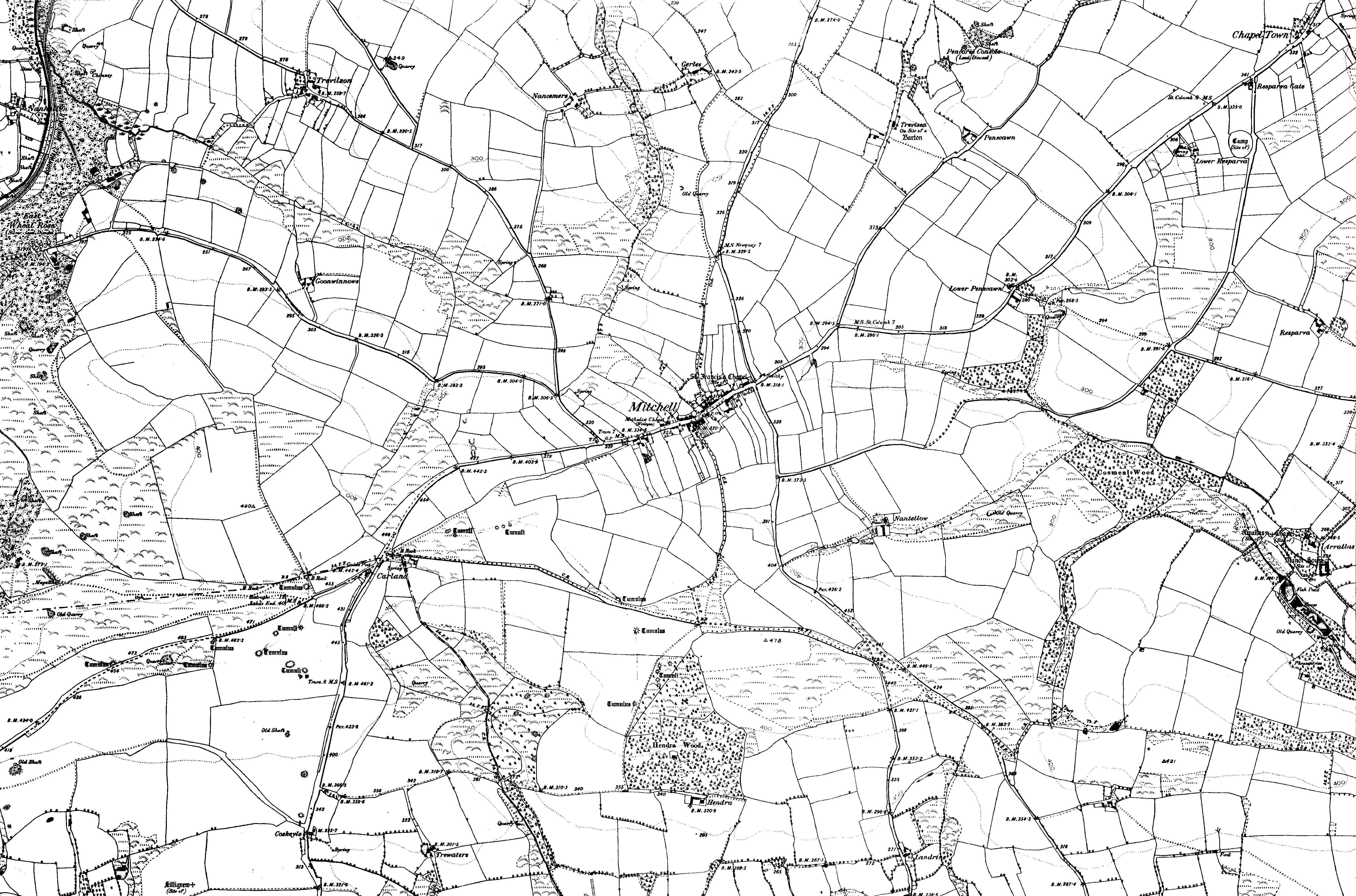
Map of Mitchell and surrounding area, 19th-century Ordnance Survey map

The borough encompassed parts of two parishes, Newlyn East and St Enoder. Like most of the Cornish boroughs enfranchised or re-enfranchised during the Tudor period, it was a rotten borough from the start.

The franchise in Mitchell was a matter of controversy in the 17th century, but was settled by a House of Commons resolution on 20 March 1700 which stated "That the right of election of members to serve in Parliament for the Borough of St Michael's, in the County of Cornwall, is in the portreeves, and lords of the manor, who are capable of being portreeves, and the inhabitants of the said borough paying scot and lot": this gave the vote to most of the male householders.

The borough was often not in the complete control of a single proprietor, the voters being swayed between those of the lords of the manor from whom they expected to receive most benefit in return. Namier quotes a memorandum on the state of the Cornish boroughs from Lord Edgcumbe to Prime Minister Newcastle in 1760, describing the Mitchell voters as

"in general low, indigent people, [who] will join such of the Under Lords from whom they have reason to expect most money and favours. Admiral Boscawen..., by supplying some of the voters with money and conferring favours on others, seems to be adding very considerably to the strength of his interest."

The landowners, however, had other expedients for gaining control. The number of voters, which in 1784 had been at least 39, was reduced by 1831 to just seven, achieved by pulling down a number of houses in the borough and letting those houses that still stood on conditions which prevented the occupiers appearing on the parish rates. The proprietors by the 1820s were the Earl of Falmouth (a Boscawen) and Sir Christopher Hawkins, Hawkins having purchased his interest some years previously from Sir Francis Basset; but Mitchell having thus been reduced to one of the smallest of all the rotten boroughs (in 1831, the borough had a population of approximately 90, and 23 houses), it was naturally disfranchised by the Reform Act 1832.

Mitchell's early MPs included the explorer and statesman Walter Raleigh, who sat briefly for the borough in the 1590s while out of favour at court and so unable to secure a more prestigious seat. A later MP was the future Duke of Wellington, who as Sir Arthur Wellesley represented the borough from January to May 1807, for part of which time he was a junior minister (Chief Secretary for Ireland) in the Duke of Portland's second government.

== Members of Parliament ==
=== 1547–1629 ===
Parliament	First member	Second member
Parliament of 1547–1552	Ralph Cholmley	Hugh Cartwright
First Parliament of 1553	Robert Beverley	Humphrey Moseley
Second Parliament of 1553	Francis Goldsmith	Edward Chamberlain
Parliament of 1554	Clement Tussard	Andrew Tussard
Parliament of 1554–1555	Paul Stamford	Andrew Tussard
Parliament of 1555	John Arundell	John Thomas
Parliament of 1558	John Arundell	Thomas Gardiner
Parliament of 1559	Drue Drury	Robert Colshill
Parliament of 1562	Robert Hopton	Thomas Wilson
Parliament of 1571	Edward Stafford	Francis Alford
Parliament of 1572–1581	Charles Lister	Thomas West
Parliament of 1584–1585	Edward Barker	James Erisey
Parliament of 1586–1587	Thomas Cosworth	Henry Sumaster
Parliament of 1588–1589	Edward Cosworth	James Clarke
Parliament of 1593	Sir Walter Raleigh	Richard Reynell
Parliament of 1597–1598	John Arundell (of Trerice)	John Carew
Parliament of 1601	George Chudleigh	William Cholmley
Parliament of 1604–1611	William Cary	William Hakewill
Addled Parliament (1614)	Christopher Hodson	Walter Hickman
Parliament of 1621–1622	Richard Carew	John St Aubyn
Happy Parliament (1624–1625)	John Holles; Denzil Holles	John Sawle
Useless Parliament (1625)	Henry Sandys	Sir John Smith
Parliament of 1625–1626	Francis Crossing	Sir John Smith
Parliament of 1628–1629	Francis Buller	John Sparke
No Parliament summoned 1629–1640

=== 1640–1832 ===
Year	First member	First party	Second member	Second party
April 1640	Double return			
November 1640	William Chadwell	Royalist	John Arundell	Royalist
1640	William Chadwell	Royalist	Robert Holborne	Royalist
August 1642	William Chadwell	Royalist	Holborne disabled from sitting – seat vacant	
January 1644	Chadwell disabled from sitting – seat vacant		Holborne disabled from sitting – seat vacant	
1647	Lord Kerr		Holborne disabled from sitting – seat vacant	
December 1648	Kerr excluded in Pride's Purge – seat vacant		Holborne disabled from sitting – seat vacant	
1653	Mitchell was unrepresented in the Barebones Parliament and the First and Second Parliaments of the Protectorate			
January 1659	James Launce		Richard Lobb	
May 1659	Not represented in the restored Rump			
April 1660	Thomas Carew		Heneage Finch	
May 1660	Thomas Carew		John Alleyn	
1661	Matthew Wren		Sir Edward Mosley	
1665	Matthew Wren		The Lord Hawley	
1673	Humphrey Borlase		The Lord Hawley	
1679	Sir John St Aubyn		Walter Vincent	
1681	Sir William Russell	Tory	Henry Vincent	
1685	Thomas Price		John Vivian	Tory
January 1689	The Viscount Fanshawe	Tory	Francis Vyvyan (MP for Mitchell)	
September 1689	William Coryton		Francis Vyvyan (MP for Mitchell)	
December 1689	Humphrey Courtney		Francis Vyvyan (MP for Mitchell)	
March 1690	Anthony Rowe		Francis Scobell	Tory
November 1690	Humphrey Courtney		Francis Scobell	Tory
1695	Humphrey Courtney		Thomas Vyvyan	
1697	John Tregagle		John Povey	
1698	Sir John Hawles	Whig	John Povey	
January 1701	William Beaw		Anthony Rowe	
March 1701	William Beaw		Sir Richard Vyvyan	Tory
December 1701	William Courtney		Sir Richard Vyvyan	Tory
1702	Renatus Bellott	Tory	Francis Basset	Tory
1705	Sir William Hodges	Whig	Hugh Fortescue	Whig
1710	Abraham Blackmore	Tory	Richard Belasyse	Tory
1713	Sir Henry Belasyse	Tory	John Statham	Tory
1715	Nathaniel Blakiston		Robert Molesworth	Whig
1722	Charles Selwyn		John Hedges	
1727	Henry Kelsall		Thomas Farrington	
1734	Thomas Watts		Robert Ord	
1741	Edward Clive		John Ord	
May 1745	Richard Lloyd		John Ord	
November 1745	Richard Lloyd		Sir Edward Pickering	
1747	Thomas Clarke		Albert Nesbitt	
1753	Thomas Clarke		Arnold Nesbitt	
1754	John Stephenson		Robert Clive	
1755	Simon Luttrell		Richard Hussey	
1761	John Stephenson		James Scawen	
1774	John Stephenson		Hon. Thomas Howard	
1779	John Stephenson		Francis Hale	
1780	Hon. William Hanger		Francis Hale	
1784	David Howell		Sir Christopher Hawkins	Tory
1796	Sir Stephen Lushington	Whig	Sir Christopher Hawkins	Tory
1799	Sir Stephen Lushington	Whig	John Simpson	
1802	Robert Dallas	Tory	Robert Sharpe Ainslie	
1805	Earl of Dalkeith		Robert Sharpe Ainslie	
1806	Sir Christopher Hawkins	Tory	Frederick Trench	Tory
January 1807	Hon. Sir Arthur Wellesley	Tory	Henry Conyngham Montgomery	
May 1807	Edward Leveson-Gower	Tory	George Galway Mills	
July 1807	Sir James Hall, Bt		George Galway Mills	
1808	Sir James Hall, Bt		Charles Trelawny-Brereton	
1809	Sir James Hall, Bt		John Bruce	
1812	George Hobart		John Bruce	
1813	Hon. Edward Law	Tory	John Bruce	
August 1814	Hon. Edward Law	Tory	Charles Trelawny-Brereton	
December 1814	Hon. Edward Law	Tory	Lord Binning	Tory
1818	Sir George Staunton, Bt		William Leake	
1820	Sir George Staunton, Bt		William Taylor Money	
April 1826	Sir George Staunton, Bt		Henry Labouchere	Whig
June 1826	William Leake	Whig	Henry Labouchere	Whig
1830	Hon. Lloyd Kenyon	Tory	John Heywood Hawkins	Whig
1831	Hon. Lloyd Kenyon	Tory	Hon. William Best	Tory
1832	Constituency abolished			
