= Boldon Book =

12th-century survey of the bishopric of Durham, England

The Boldon Book (also known as the Boldon Buke) contains the results of a survey of the bishopric of Durham that was completed on the orders of Hugh du Puiset, Bishop of Durham, in 1183, designed to assist the administration of the vast diocesan estates. The survey was similar to that of the Domesday Book in the previous century, covering the bishop's lands in what was to become County Durham and other parts of the north east of England that, following the Norman Conquest, were liable to tax by the Prince-Bishop of Durham and not taxed directly by the King of England. It is the first survey undertaken north of the River Tees, where the king's authority was never more than nominal.

Like the Domesday Book it is a custumal account listing the labour, money and produce owed by standing custom to the Bishop. The areas of North Durham (Norhamshire) and Bedlingtonshire are included, but not those areas in the possession of other great northern landowners. The Bishop's manor at Boldon was listed early in the survey, and later entries recorded customal dues "as at Boldon", hence the name.

Dues were assessed at the individual level as well as by community. The book attests to the overwhelmingly pastoral economy of the North, and provides a contrast to the better-documented southeast, "in particular the existence of large estates often comprising several villages which sometimes share a single demesne".

The Boldon Book survives in four manuscript copies, of which the oldest is the 13th-century copy that was among the Temple family manuscripts at Stowe House that are now in the British Library.

The Boldon Book is discussed by G. T. Lapsley, "Introduction to and Text of the Boldon Book," Victoria County History: Durham vol. 1 (London, 1905) pp. 259–341, with an English translation, pp. 327–51. The Latin text and an English translation are provided in D. Austin, ed., Boldon Book: Northumberland and Durham in Phillimore's edition of Domesday Book, vol. 35 (Chichester, 1982)
