= Tackers =

'Tackers' was the name given to High Tory Members of Parliament who in 1704 tried to attach ('tack') an Occasional Conformity Bill to money bills in order to pass it through the House of Lords and into law.

The Tackers ultimately failed in their efforts, but their actions proved highly polarising in the 1705 English general election. While there were some successful Whig campaigns to unseat Tacker MPs, some parts of the country had the Tories successfully campaign under the rallying cry of 'Church in Danger', with the Tackers' efforts being positively seen as an effort to protect the established Church of England from nonconformists and Dissent.

The Tackers' actions caused Queen Anne to turn away from their party as the War of Spanish Succession continued for the next decade. Instead, she added more Whigs to her government, leading to the revival of the Whig Junto.
