= 1705 English general election =

General election in England

- 7 May – 6 June 1705

All 513 seats in the House of Commons 257 seats needed for a majority
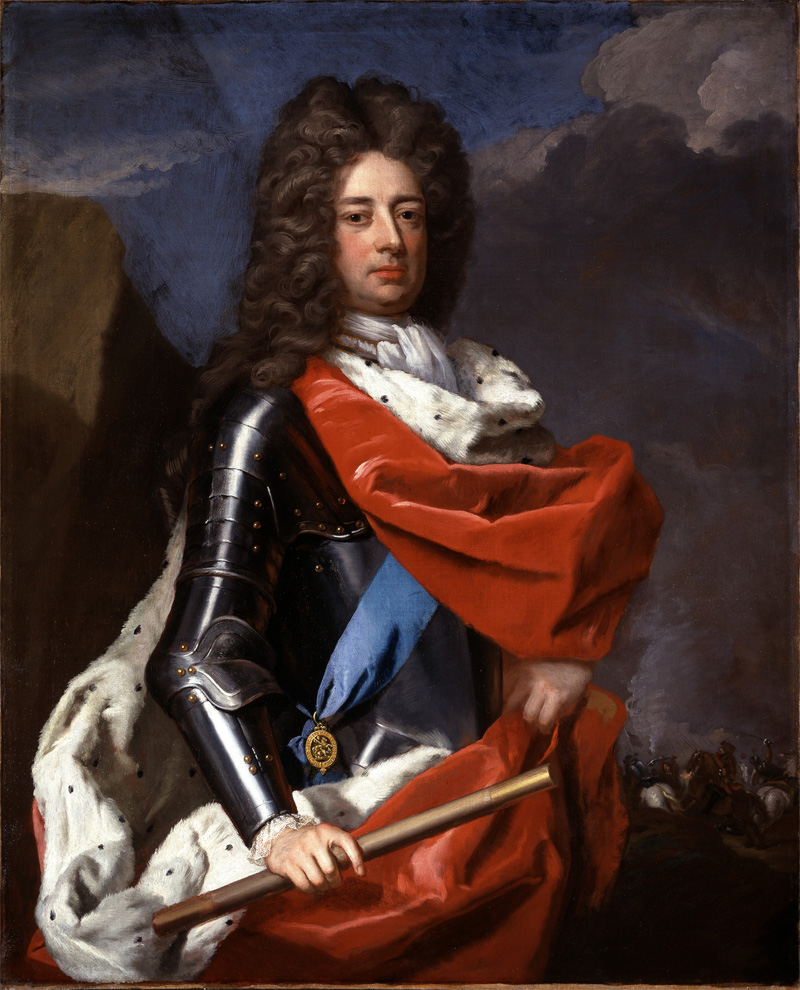

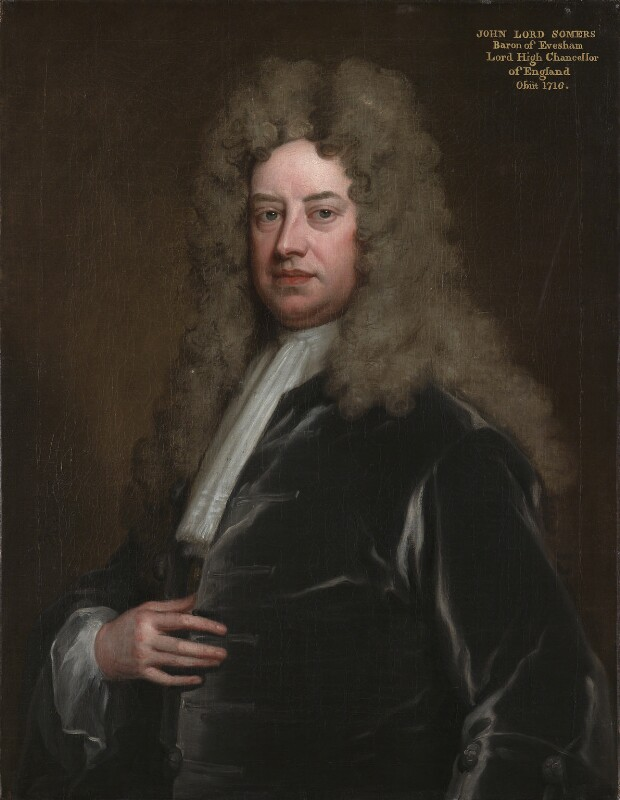

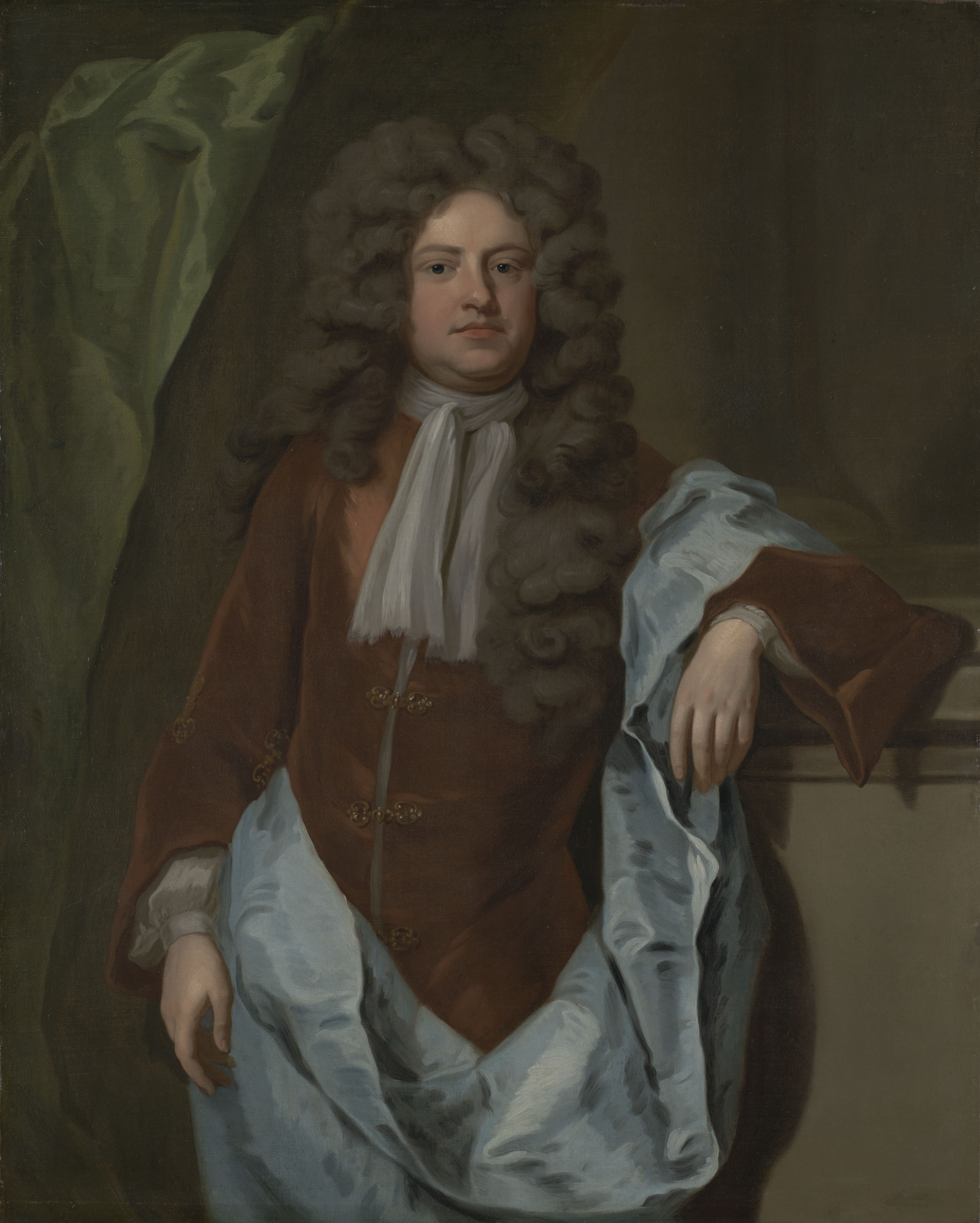

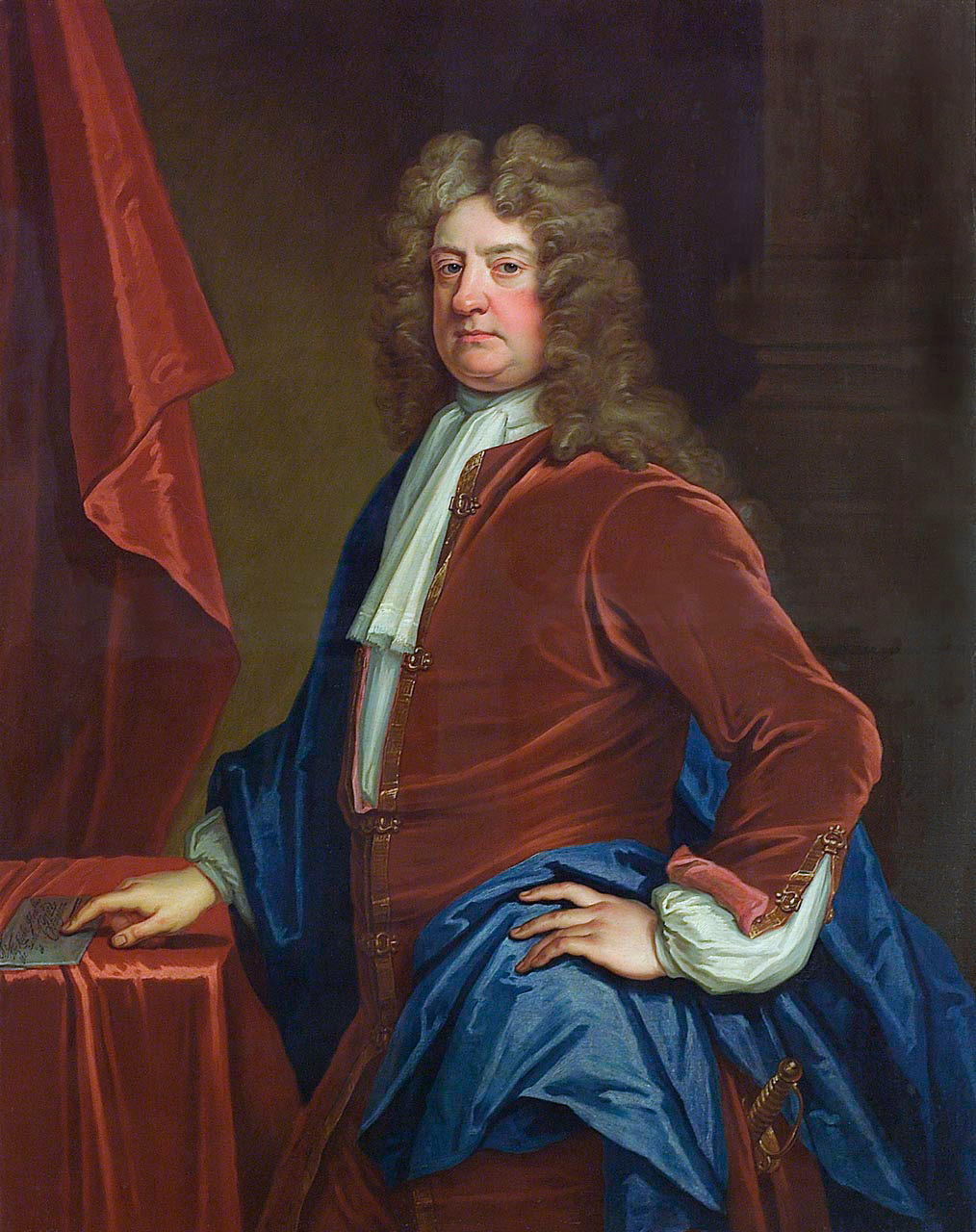
	First party	Second party
Leader	Duke of Marlborough	Whig Junto (Baron Somers, Baron Halifax, Baron Wharton)
Party	Tory	Whig
Seats won	260	233
Seat change	▼38	▲49
- House of Commons after election (Whigs-orange, Tories-blue)

English Parliament of General Election 1705

The 1705 English general election saw contests in 110 constituencies in England and Wales, roughly 41% of the total. The election was fiercely fought, with mob violence and cries of "Church in Danger" occurring in several boroughs. During the previous session of Parliament the Tories had become increasingly unpopular, and their position was therefore somewhat weakened by the election, particularly by the Tackers controversy. Due to the uncertain loyalty of a group of 'moderate' Tories led by Robert Harley, the parties were roughly balanced in the House of Commons following the election, encouraging the Whigs to demand a greater share in the government led by Marlborough.

This was the final election to be held in the Kingdom of England.

== Summary of the constituencies ==
See 1796 British general election for details. The constituencies used in England and Wales were the same throughout the period. In 1707 alone the 45 Scottish members were not elected from the constituencies, but were returned by co-option in a part of the membership of the last Parliament of Scotland elected before the Acts of Union 1707.

Party strengths are an approximation, with many MPs' allegiances being unknown.

== Involved parties ==
In 1705 the House of Commons was controlled by two parties: the Tory party led by John Churchill, Duke of Marlborough, and the Whig party led by a group of leading party members known as the Whig Junto. The four members of the Whig Junto were John Somers, Charles Montagu, Thomas Wharton, and Edward Russell.

== Overview of 18th-century British politics ==
The politics of Britain in 1705 was chaotic. The government was very decentralised and led to unrest in the general population. This led to the mob violence that occurred during this election process across the country.

== See also ==
- List of members of the House of Commons at Westminster 1705–08
- 2nd Parliament of Queen Anne
- List of parliaments of England
