= List of elections in 1949 =

The following elections occurred in the year 1949.

== Asia ==
=== Afghanistan ===
- 1949 Afghan parliamentary election

=== Iran ===
- 1949 Iranian Constituent Assembly election
- 1949 Iranian Senate elections

=== Israel ===
- 1949 Israeli legislative election
- 1949 Israeli presidential election

=== Japan ===
- 1949 Japanese general election

=== Philippines ===
- 1949 Philippine House of Representatives elections
- 1949 Philippine Senate election
- 1949 Philippine general election
- 1949 Philippine presidential election

== Europe ==
=== Belgium ===
- 1949 Belgian general election

=== Germany ===
- 1949 East German Constitutional Assembly election
- 1949 German presidential election
- 1949 West German federal election
- Bürgerschaftswahl in Hamburg 16 October 1949 (see also Max Brauer)

=== Hungary ===
- 1949 Hungarian parliamentary election

=== Iceland ===
- 1949 Icelandic parliamentary election
- 1949 Icelandic presidential election

=== Norway ===
- 1949 Norwegian parliamentary election

=== Portugal ===
- 1949 Portuguese legislative election
- 1949 Portuguese presidential election

=== Trieste ===
- 1949 Free Territory of Trieste municipal election

=== United Kingdom ===
- 1949 Batley and Morley by-election
- 1949 Bradford South by-election
- 1949 Hammersmith South by-election
- 1949 St Pancras North by-election
- 1949 Sowerby by-election
- Elections in England and Wales, 1949
- 1949 Northern Ireland general election

==== United Kingdom local ====
- Elections in England and Wales, 1949
- 1949 Manchester Council election
- 1949 United Kingdom local elections

===== English local =====
- 1949 Bermondsey Borough election
- 1949 Southwark Borough election

== North America ==
=== Canada ===
- 1949 Canadian federal election
- 1949 British Columbia general election
- 1949 Edmonton municipal election
- 1949 Manitoba general election
- 1949 Newfoundland general election
- 1949 Nova Scotia general election
- 1949 Progressive Conservative Party of Ontario leadership election
- 1949 Toronto municipal election
- 1949 Yukon general election

=== Mexico ===
- 1949 Mexican legislative election

=== United States ===
- 1949 New York state election

==== United States lieutenant gubernatorial ====
- 1949 Virginia lieutenant gubernatorial election

==== United States gubernatorial ====
- 1949 New Jersey gubernatorial election
- 1949 United States gubernatorial elections
- 1949 Virginia gubernatorial election

==== United States House of Representatives ====
- 1949 United States House of Representatives elections

==== United States Senate ====
- 1949 United States Senate elections
- 1949 United States Senate special election in New York

==== United States mayoral elections ====
- 1949 Atlanta mayoral election
- 1949 Cleveland mayoral election
- 1949 Hartford, Connecticut mayoral election
- 1949 Manchester, New Hampshire mayoral election
- 1949 New York City mayoral election
- 1949 Pittsburgh mayoral election
- 1949 Springfield mayoral election

== Oceania ==
=== Australia ===
- 1949 Australian federal election
- 1949 Cessnock state by-election
- 1949 Cobar state by-election
- 1949 Concord state by-election
- 1949 Ipswich state by-election
- 1949 Kurilpa state by-election
- 1949 Prahran state by-election
- 1949 Redfern state by-election
- 1949 Richmond state by-election

=== French Oceania ===
- French legislative by-election in French Oceania, 1949

=== New Zealand ===
- 1949 New Zealand general election

== South America ==
=== Falkland Islands ===
- 1949 Falkland Islands general election

== See also ==
- Category:1949 elections
