= 1905 Hampstead by-election =

UK parliamentary by-election

| ← 1902 | 26 October 1905 | 1906 → |

| Candidate | Fletcher | Rowe |
| Party | Conservative | Liberal |
| Popular vote | 4,228 | 3,803 |
| Percentage | 52.6% | 47.4% |
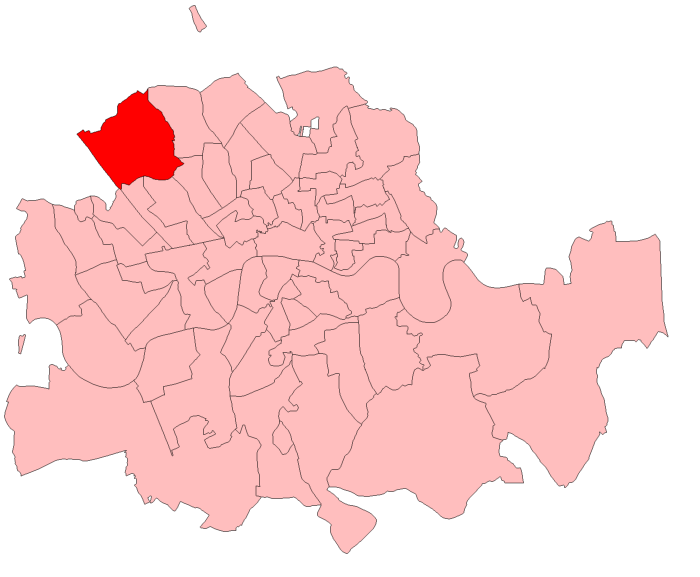
MP before election
Thomas Milvain
Conservative
Subsequent MP
John Fletcher
Conservative

The 1905 Hampstead by-election was a Parliamentary by-election held on 26 October 1905. The constituency returned one Member of Parliament (MP) to the House of Commons of the United Kingdom, elected by the first past the post voting system.

== Vacancy ==
Thomas Milvain had been Conservative MP for the seat of Hampstead since the 1902 Hampstead by-election. Milvain resigned the seat when he was appointed Judge Advocate General.

== Electoral history ==
The seat had been Conservative since it was created in 1885. They easily held the seat at the last election;

1902 Hampstead by-election
| Party | Candidate | Votes | % | ±% |
|---|---|---|---|---|
| Conservative | Thomas Milvain | 3,843 | 64.5 | N/A |
| Liberal | George Frederic Rowe | 2,118 | 35.5 | N/A |
| Majority | | 1,725 | 29.0 | N/A |
| Turnout | | 5,961 | 58.0 | N/A |
| Conservative hold | | Swing | N/A | |

== Candidates ==
The local Conservative Association selected 63-year-old John Fletcher as their candidate to defend the seat. Fletcher had good local connections. He was a member of the Hampstead Board of Guardians from 1876 to 1898. He was an elected member of the London County Council representing Hampstead for the Conservative backed Municipal Reform Party from 1889 to 1904. He served as one of the Council's deputy chairmen from 1900 to 1904.

The local Liberal Association selected George Frederic Rowe as their candidate to gain the seat. Rowe had been the Liberal candidate in the 1902 by-election.

== Campaign ==
Rowe launched his campaign on 11 October with a public meeting at Hampstead Town Hall, sharing a platform with the London Liberal MP, Thomas Macnamara. On 13 October he held his second public meeting at Brondesbury Hall. Fletcher's campaign, slower off the mark, sought to build upon his strong local links. He supported the Unionist government in its policy positions. He advocated the reduction in Irish representation in the UK parliament. The Hampstead Temperance Council had invited both candidates to address their meeting, but Fletcher chose not to attend. The HTC gave its support to Rowe and Fletcher responded by seeking the support of local licensed victuallers. Rowe's third public meeting at West Hampstead Town Hall featured Leo Chiozza Money the Liberal candidate for neighbouring Paddington. Fletcher's first public meeting in Haverstock Hill, had him sharing a platform with Nottingham MP, Edward Bond and Keighley candidate William Mitchell Acworth. Polling Day was fixed for the 26 October 1905. As Fletcher was a supporter of protectionism, Rowe received the endorsement of the Hampstead Free Trade League. On 23 October Winston Churchill who had left the Conservatives and joined the Liberals primarily because of the free trade v protectionism issue, addressed a public meeting organised by the Hampstead Free Trade League.

== Result ==
The Liberals massively reduced the majority of the Conservatives, thanks to a swing of 11.9%:

1905 Hampstead by-election
| Party | Candidate | Votes | % | ±% |
|---|---|---|---|---|
| Conservative | John Fletcher | 4,228 | 52.6 | −11.9 |
| Liberal | George Frederic Rowe | 3,803 | 47.4 | +11.9 |
| Majority | | 425 | 5.2 | −23.8 |
| Turnout | | 8,028 | 71.1 | +13.1 |
| Conservative hold | | Swing | -11.9 | |

The result should have been a good indicator to Unionist Prime Minister Arthur Balfour that the mood in the country was swinging behind the Liberals. He soon chose to resign as Prime Minister.

== Aftermath ==
At the following General Election the result was similar:

General election January 1906
| Party | Candidate | Votes | % | ±% |
|---|---|---|---|---|
| Conservative | John Fletcher | 4,934 | 52.5 | −0.1 |
| Liberal | George Frederic Rowe | 4,461 | 47.5 | +0.1 |
| Majority | | 473 | 5.0 | −0.2 |
| Turnout | | 9,395 | 81.9 | +10.8 |
| Conservative hold | | Swing | | |
