= Geoffrey Finsberg =

British Conservative politician

The Right Honourable The Lord Finsberg MBE JP

Member of Parliament for Hampstead and Highgate (Hampstead 1970-1983)
- In office 18 June 1970 – 16 March 1992
- Preceded by: Benjamin Whitaker
- Succeeded by: Glenda Jackson

Personal details
- Born: 13 June 1926 Hampstead, London
- Died: 8 October 1996 (aged 70) Stockholm, Sweden
- Party: Conservative
- Spouses: Pamela Benbow Hill (m. 1969; died 1989) Yvonne Elizabeth Sarch (née Wright) (m. 1990)

Geoffrey Finsberg, Baron Finsberg, MBE, JP (13 June 1926 – 8 October 1996) was a British Conservative politician. He was the Member of Parliament (MP) for Hampstead from 1970 to 1983, and for its successor constituency, Hampstead and Highgate, from 1983 to 1992.

== Early life ==
Finsberg was born in Hampstead in 1926 into a devout Jewish family, who were politically inclined towards the Conservatives. The only son of the late Montefiore Finsberg, MC, and May Finsberg (née Grossman), Finsberg was educated at Hendon County Grammar School and the City of London School. From 1944 to 1947, he worked in coal pits as a Bevin Boy, this period spanning the latter part of the Second World War. Finsberg served at Glapwell colliery in Derbyshire; in 1993, he was elected as the first president of the Bevin Boys Association.

== Political career ==
=== Local government ===
From a young age, Finsberg was active in the Conservative Party, and was founder chairman of Mansfield Young Conservatives from 1946 to 1947; this was the area where he was working as a Bevin Boy. He subsequently became chairman of the Hampstead Young Conservatives, aged 22, at a time when the constituency had nearly 1,000 party members. Before he turned 23, Finsberg was elected as a councillor for the Metropolitan Borough of Hampstead at the 1949 local elections, representing the West End ward. The same year, he became a member of the Executive Committee of the National Union of Conservative and Unionist Associations, a role he would hold until 1979.

Finsberg was keen to get into Parliament, and, along with many others, he schemed to remove Hampstead's incumbent Conservative MP, Charles Challen, and replace him with Henry Brooke. The latter was returned at the general election of 1950, and later became Home Secretary. According to The Times, Finsberg "saw himself in the direct line of succession".

In 1953, he moved to represent Hampstead's Central ward as a councillor, where he topped the poll, repeating this feat at the 1956 elections. He was subsequently re-elected at the following two council elections. At the 1955 general election, he stood for Parliament in the Labour-held seat of Islington East, without success. Finsberg served as National Chairman of the Young Conservatives from 1954 to 1957.

He became a Justice of the Peace (JP) for Inner London in 1962. By 1965, the London boroughs had been reorganised, and Finsberg had moved to the new Borough of Camden, which succeeded his old local authority. He was elected to Camden's Hampstead Central ward at the inaugural 1964 elections, and became Leader of the Council in 1968, a role he held until 1970. Finsberg remained a Camden councillor until 1974.

He was Deputy Chairman (1969–1971) and Vice-President of the Association of Municipal Corporations (1971–74): Patrick Cosgrave, writing in The Independent, later said that Finsberg "had a deep, and almost tactile, understanding of how local government worked and he was a formidable administrator. Few dared to cross his path for, besides being immensely knowledgeable, he could be exceptionally vain and overbearing; and he did not forget enmities." From 1972 to 1975, Finsberg was Chairman of the Greater London Area Conservative Local Government Committee.

=== In Parliament ===
At the 1970 general election, whilst still serving as a councillor, Finsberg was elected as the Member of Parliament for Hampstead, unseating the incumbent Labour MP Benjamin Whitaker by a margin of just 474 votes. The same year, he became a member of the Select Committee on Expenditure, remaining there until 1979.

Finsberg acted as Opposition spokesman on Greater London from 1974 to 1979, and was a member of the Executive of the 1922 Committee, representing Conservative backbenchers, from 1974 to 1975. In addition, he was a Vice-Chairman of the Conservative Party Organisation from 1975 to 1979.

Throughout his time in Parliament, Finsberg's constituency remained marginal, with his victories always less than 10% ahead of his nearest rival. At the 1979 general election, he won against Labour's Ken Livingstone, a future Leader of the Greater London Council and Mayor of London.

Following the Conservatives' election victory, he served in two junior ministerial roles, as Parliamentary Under Secretary of State at the Department of the Environment (1979–81), and the Department of Health and Social Security (1981–83). The Times later suggested that his inability to progress further "could have been because he lacked excitement. His public persona was dull; in private, he could be an amusing companion."

Boundary changes saw Finsberg become the MP for Hampstead and Highgate at the 1983 general election, at which he beat another Labour left-winger, John McDonnell. That year, Finsberg again became a Vice-Chairman of the Conservative Party Organisation, holding this role until 1987. From 1986 to 1989, he was President of the Greater London Area Executive Committee of the National Union of Conservative and Unionist Associations.

In 1983, Finsberg became a member of the Parliamentary Assembly of the Council of Europe and the Western European Union; in 1987, he became its delegation leader. He was President of the Parliamentary Assembly of the Council of Europe from 1991 to 1992, "over which he presided with the aplomb that he had shown forty years before in Hampstead", The Times later noted, adding, "He was one of nature's chairmen, brisk in the conduct of business."

Finsberg was the founding Vice-Chairman of the parliamentary branch of Conservative Friends of Israel: he broke the party Whip during the 1973 Yom Kippur War to vote against his leader Ted Heath's government in a division on an arms embargo.

Finsberg retired from Parliament at the 1992 general election, at which his seat was taken by Labour's Glenda Jackson, defeating Conservative Oliver Letwin. He was created a life peer in 1992 as Baron Finsberg, of Hampstead in the London Borough of Camden.

== Outside Parliament ==
Outside of politics, Finsberg was active in business and charities. From 1968 to 1979, he was Controller of Personnel and Chief Industrial Relations Adviser at Great Universal Stores. Finsberg served as a member (from 1983 to 1986) and Deputy Chairman (from 1986 to 1989) of the South East Regional Board at Trustee Savings Bank (TSB). He was also a member of the Post Office Users National Council from 1970 to 1977, and a member of the Council of the Confederation of British Industry (CBI) from 1968 to 1979, where he was Chairman of the Post Office Panel.

He served as Vice-President of the Association of Municipal Corporations from 1971 to 1974, where he was also Deputy Chairman from 1969 to 1971. From 1993 to 1995, he was Joint National Treasurer of the Council of Christians and Jews; he became its Joint National Honorary Secretary in 1995. Finsberg was a patron of the Maccabi Association of Great Britain, and in 1993, became a trustee of the Marie Curie Cancer Foundation. He was also vice president and life patron of Children and Youth Aliyah. In addition, Finsberg was a governor of University College School in Hampstead.

== Honours ==
Finsberg became a Fellow of the Institute of Personnel Management in 1975. He was appointed a Member of the Order of the British Empire (MBE) in the 1959 New Year Honours, and knighted in the 1984 New Year Honours. Outside the UK, Finsberg was awarded Austria's Order of Merit in 1989, and the following year, became a Commander of the Order of Isabella the Catholic in Spain.

== Personal life and death ==
In 1969, Finsberg married Pamela Benbow Hill; she died in 1989, and the following year, he married Yvonne Elizabeth Sarch (née Wright), who was an old friend of his. He had no children. Finsberg listed bridge and reading as his recreations. He was a member of the Carlton Club and the Marylebone Cricket Club. Finsberg lived in South Hampstead, part of his former constituency.

Finsberg died on 8 October 1996, aged 70, in Stockholm. He was survived by his second wife, Lady Finsberg.

== Arms ==
Coat of arms of Geoffrey Finsberg
Coronet A Coronet of a Baron Crest In a Circlet Or fretty Gules a Demi Stag Argent attired and unguled Or gorged with a Chaplet of Holly proper and holding between the forelegs a Miner's Lamp Or Escutcheon Azure on a Cross quarterly Argent and Gules between twelve Mullets in circle three three three and three Or a Sword erect in pale point upwards also Or and four Fleurs-de-lys Or Supporters Dexter: a Black Cat; Sinister: a Dalmatian Dog, the whole upon a Compartment comprising a Grassy Mount extending on each side into a Hillock all proper Motto Non Sibi Sed Toti

Parliament of the United Kingdom
Preceded by Benjamin Whitaker	Member of Parliament for Hampstead; 1970–1983	Constituency abolished
New constituency	Member of Parliament for Hampstead and Highgate; 1983–1992	Succeeded by Glenda Jackson
Political offices
Preceded by Andreas Björck	President of the Parliamentary Assembly of the Council of Europe; 1992	Succeeded by Miguel Angel Martinez Martinez
