= 1902 Hampstead by-election =

UK parliamentary by-election

- 24 January 1902

| Candidate | Milvain | Rowe |
| Party | Conservative | Liberal |
| Popular vote | 3,843 | 2,118 |
| Percentage | 64.5% | 35.5% |
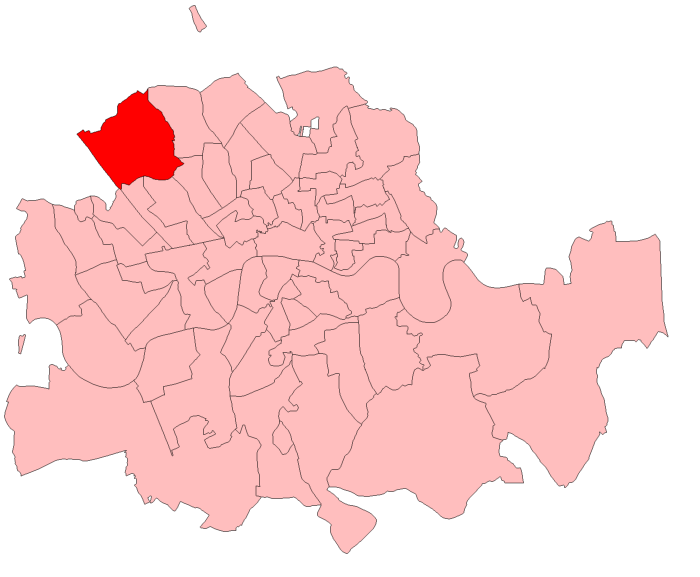
MP before election
Edward Brodie Hoare
Conservative
Subsequent MP
John Fletcher
Conservative

The 1902 Hampstead by-election was a Parliamentary by-election held on 24 January 1902. The constituency returned one Member of Parliament (MP) to the House of Commons of the United Kingdom, elected by the first past the post voting system.

== Electoral history ==
The seat had been Conservative since it was created in 1885.

1900 general election: Hampstead
| Party | Candidate | Votes | % | ±% |
|---|---|---|---|---|
| Conservative | Edward Brodie Hoare | Unopposed | | |
| Conservative hold | | | | |

== Result ==
1902 Hampstead by-election
| Party | Candidate | Votes | % | ±% |
|---|---|---|---|---|
| Conservative | Thomas Milvain | 3,843 | 64.5 | N/A |
| Liberal | George Frederic Rowe | 2,118 | 35.5 | New |
| Majority | | 1,725 | 29.0 | N/A |
| Turnout | | 5,961 | 58.0 | N/A |
| Conservative hold | | Swing | N/A | |

== Aftermath ==
1905 Hampstead by-election
| Party | Candidate | Votes | % | ±% |
|---|---|---|---|---|
| Conservative | John Fletcher | 4,228 | 52.6 | −11.9 |
| Liberal | George Frederic Rowe | 3,803 | 47.4 | +11.9 |
| Majority | | 425 | 5.2 | −23.8 |
| Turnout | | 8,028 | 71.1 | +13.1 |
| Conservative hold | | Swing | -11.9 | |
