= Farrer Herschell, 1st Baron Herschell =

British politician and Chancellor in late 1800s

The Right Honourable The Lord Herschell GCB PC DL FRS
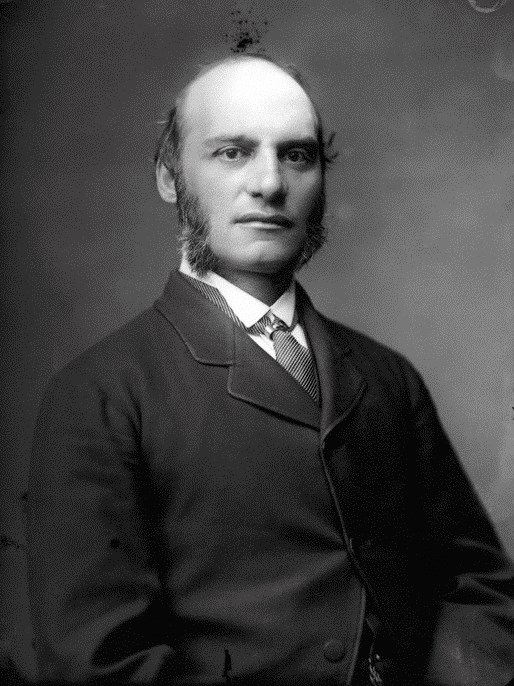

Lord Chancellor
- In office 6 February 1886 – 20 July 1886
- Monarch: Victoria
- Prime Minister: William Ewart Gladstone
- Preceded by: The Lord Halsbury
- Succeeded by: The Lord Halsbury
- In office 18 August 1892 – 21 June 1895
- Monarch: Victoria
- Prime Minister: William Ewart Gladstone; The Earl of Rosebery
- Preceded by: The Lord Halsbury
- Succeeded by: The Lord Halsbury

Solicitor General for England and Wales
- In office 3 May 1880 – 9 June 1885
- Prime Minister: William Ewart Gladstone
- Preceded by: Hardinge Giffard (later Lord Halsbury)
- Succeeded by: Sir John Eldon Gorst

Personal details
- Born: 2 November 1837 Brampton, Hampshire, England
- Died: 1 March 1899 (aged 61) Washington D.C., United States
- Party: Liberal
- Spouse: Agnes Adela Herschell
- Education: University College London

Farrer Herschell, 1st Baron Herschell, GCB, PC, DL, FRS (2 November 1837 – 1 March 1899), was Lord High Chancellor of Great Britain in 1886, and again from 1892 to 1895.

== Life ==
=== Childhood and education ===
Herschell was born on 2 November 1837 in Brampton, Hampshire. His parents were Helen Skirving Mowbray and the Rev. Ridley Haim Herschell, who was a native of Strzelno, in Prussian Poland. When Ridley was a young man, he converted from Judaism to Christianity and took a leading part in founding the British Society for the Propagation of the Gospel Among the Jews. He eventually settled down to the charge of a Nonconformist chapel near the Edgware Road, in London, where he ministered to a large congregation.

Farrer was educated at a grammar school in South London and attended lectures at the University of Bonn as a teenager, where his family lived for six months in 1852. In 1857 he took his BA degree with honours in Greek and mathematics at University College London, receiving prizes in logic and political economy. He was regarded as the best speaker at the University College London Union Debating Society and was editor of a University Review along with R.D. Littler. He later served as an examiner in common law for the University of London from 1872 to 1876.

=== Early career ===
Herschell's reputation persisted after he became a law student at Lincoln's Inn. On 12 January 1858 he entered the chambers of Thomas Chitty, the famous special pleader. His fellow pupils included Archibald Levin Smith, subsequently Master of the Rolls, and Arthur Charles who became a judge of the Queen's Bench. He subsequently read with James Hannen, who went on to become Lord Hannen. His fellow pupils gave him the sobriquet "Chief Baron" because of his air of superiority. On 17 November 1860 he was called to the bar and joined the Northern Circuit.

For four or five years he did not obtain much work, although he was financially secure. He spoke to Charles Russell and William Court Gully about the possibility of leaving England and instead working for the British Consular Courts in China. However, Herschell soon made himself useful to Edward James, the then leader of the Northern Circuit, and to John Richard Quain, the leading stuffgownsman. For the latter he noted briefs and drafted legal opinions. When, in 1866, Quain took silk, Herschell inherited much of his junior practice. In 1872, Herschell took silk and the following year, he became Recorder of Carlisle.

=== Member of Parliament ===
By 1874, his business had become so good that he turned his thoughts to politics and election to Parliament. In February of that year there was a general election, with the result that the Conservative Party came into power with a parliamentary majority of fifty. The two Radicals, Thomas Charles Thompson and John Henderson who had been returned for City of Durham were unseated, and an attack was then made on the seats of two other Radicals, Isaac Lowthian Bell and Charles Mark Palmer who had been returned for North Durham. Herschell was briefed for one of the latter. He made such an impression on the local Radical leaders that they asked him to stand for City of Durham. After two weeks' electioneering, he was elected as junior member.

Between 1874 and 1880, Herschell was assiduous in his attendance of the House of Commons. He was not a frequent speaker, but his few efforts garnered him a favourable reputation as a debater. On one occasion, he carried a resolution in favour of abolishing actions for breach of promise of marriage except when actual pecuniary loss had ensued, the damages in such cases to be measured by the amount of such loss. He also prominently opposed the Fugitive Slave Circular. In 1878, he also pointed out the unconstitutionality of Lord Hartington's proposal to censure the government for bringing Indian troops to Malta. He was noticed by Prime Minister William Ewart Gladstone, who in 1880 appointed Herschell Solicitor General.

=== Solicitor General ===
Herschell was knighted on 13 May 1880, within weeks of his appointment as Solicitor General, a position he was to hold until 1885. During this time, he turned down positions as a Lord of Appeal and Master of the Rolls. As Solicitor General, he drafted multiple bills, most notably the Irish Land Act 1881, the Corrupt Practices Act 1883, the Bankruptcy Act 1883, the County Franchise Act 1884. He also assisted Sir Mackenzie Chalmers with the drafting of the Bills of Exchange Act 1882.

He also drafted the Redistribution of Seats Act 1885 which halved the representation of Durham City, thus requiring him to quit his seat. Betting on the local support of the Cavendish family, he contested the North Lonsdale division of Lancashire, but in spite of the powerful influence of Lord Hartington, he was badly beaten at the poll. Gladstone, however, again obtained a majority in Parliament. Herschell felt the Solicitor General's post slipping away from him, and along with it all prospects of promotion. Lord Selborne and Sir Henry James, however, successively declined Gladstone's offer of the Woolsack, and Herschell suddenly found himself Lord Chancellor.

=== Lord Chancellor ===
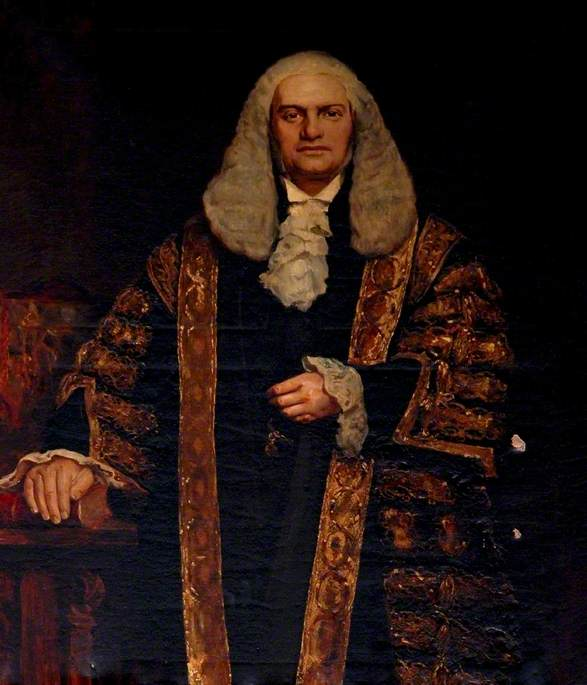
Lord Herschell as Lord Chancellor, by Hubert von Herkomer.

On 6 February 1886, he became Lord Chancellor and was sworn of the Privy Council. He was also elevated to the peerage as Baron Herschell of the city of Durham. However, his first chancellorship lasted barely four months, because in June 1886 Gladstone's Home Rule Bill was rejected in the Commons and his ministry fell.

In August 1892, when Gladstone returned to power, Herschell again became Lord Chancellor. In May 1893, he was appointed to the Order of the Bath as a Knight Grand Cross (GCB). In September 1893, when the second Home Rule BiIl came on for second reading in the House of Lords, Herschell took advantage of the opportunity to justify his own 1885 sudden conversion to Home Rule, and that of his colleagues, by comparing it to the Duke of Wellington's conversion to Catholic emancipation in 1829 and to that of Sir Robert Peel to Free Trade in 1846. In 1895, however, his second chancellorship came to an end with the defeat of the Rosebery ministry.

He was perhaps seen at his judicial best in Vagliano v. Bank of England (1891) and Allen v. Flood (1898). Latterly he showed a tendency to interrupt counsel overmuch. The latter case is an example of this. The question involved was what constituted a "molestation of a man in the pursuit of his lawful calling". At the close of the argument of counsel, whom he had frequently interrupted, one of their lordships observed that although there might be a doubt as to what amounted to such molestation in point of law, the House could well understand, after that day's proceedings, what it was in actual practice.

=== Other public service ===
In addition to his political and judicial work, Herschell rendered many public services. He became a deputy lieutenant of the County Palatine of Durham in 1885 and of the County of Kent in 1890. In 1888 he presided over an inquiry directed by the House of Commons, with regard to the Metropolitan Board of Works. He acted as chairman of two royal commissions, one on Indian currency, the other on vaccination. In 1890, he was appointed Captain of Deal Castle and Warden of the Cinque Ports. He took a great interest in the National Society for the Prevention of Cruelty to Children, not only promoting the acts of 1889 and 1894, but also in sifting the truth of allegations which had been brought against the management of that society. He was elected a Fellow of the Royal Society in January 1892.

In June 1893 he was appointed chancellor of the University of London succeeding the Earl of Derby. His views of reform, according to Victor Dickins, the accomplished registrar of the university, were liberal and frankly stated, though at first they were not altogether popular. He disarmed opposition by his intellectual power, rather than conciliated it by compromise, and sometimes was perhaps a little forceful in his approach various matters of controversy.

His characteristic power of detachment was well illustrated by his treatment of the proposal to remove the university to the site of the Imperial Institute at South Kensington. Although he was then chairman of the institute, the most irreconcilable opponent of the removal never questioned his absolute impartiality. Herschell had been officially connected with the Imperial Institute from its inception. He was chairman of the provisional committee appointed by Edward Prince of Wales to formulate a scheme for its organisation, and he took an active part in the preparation of its royal charter and constitution in conjunction with Lord Thring, Lord James, Sir Frederick Abel and Sir John Hollams. He was the first chairman of its council, and, except during his tour in India in 1888, when he brought the institute to the notice of the Indian authorities, he was hardly absent from a single meeting. For his special services in this connection he received the Order of the Bath in 1893, this being the only instance of a Lord Chancellor being decorated with an order. In 1893 he became, at its foundation, president of the Society of Comparative Legislation.

In 1897 he was appointed, jointly with Lord Justice Collins, to represent Great Britain on the Venezuela Boundary Commission, which met in Paris in the spring of 1899. Such a complicated business involved a careful study of maps and historic documents. Not content with this, he accepted in 1898 a seat on the Anglo-American Arbitration Commission appointed to adjudicate in the Alaska boundary dispute and to adjust boundaries and other important questions pending between Great Britain and Canada on the one hand and the United States on the other hand. He started for the US in July of that year, and was received cordially at Washington D.C.. His fellow commissioners elected him their president.

=== Death ===
In February 1899, while the commission was in full swing, Herchell slipped in the street and fractured his pelvis. His constitution, which at one time was a robust one, had been undermined by constant hard work, and proved unequal to sustaining the shock. On 1 March, only two weeks after the accident, he died at the Shoreham Hotel, Washington, a post-mortem examination revealing heart disease. John Hay, United States Secretary of State, at once telegraphed to Joseph Hodges Choate, the United States Ambassador to the United Kingdom, the deep sorrow felt by President William McKinley. The prime minister of Canada, Sir Wilfrid Laurier, said the next day in the Canadian House of Commons that he regarded Herschell's death as a misfortune to Canada and to the British Empire.

A funeral service held in St John's Episcopal Church, Washington, was attended by the president and vice-president of the United States, by the cabinet ministers, the judges of the Supreme Court, the members of the joint high commission, and a large number of senators and other representative men. The body was brought to London in a British man-of-war, HMS Talbot and a second funeral service was held in Westminster Abbey, which was attended by Lord Halsbury, Lord Kimberley, Arthur Balfour and other representatives of the British, American, and Canadian governments. He was buried on 22 March 1899 at Tincleton, Dorset, in the parish church where he had been married.

== Personal life ==
Herschell left a widow whom he had married in 1876, Agnes Adela, daughter of Edward Leigh Kindersley and granddaughter of Vice-Chancellor Richard Torin Kindersley. Lady Herschell died at Pau, Pyrénées-Atlantiques on 23 February 1902. They left a son, Richard Herschell (1878–1929), who succeeded as second baron, and three daughters: Helen Mowbray Herschell, Muriel Fanny Herschell, and Agnes Freda Forres.

He was a member of a number of social clubs, including Brooks's, the Athenaenum Club, the Windham Club, the Devonshire Club, and the National Liberal Club. He also received honorary degrees from the University of Oxford and the University of Cambridge.

== Arms ==
Coat of arms of Farrer Herschell, 1st Baron Herschell
Crest On a mount Vert a stag Proper gorged with a collar gemel Azure the dexter forefoot supporting a fasces in bend Or. Escutcheon Per fess Azure and Sable a fasces fesswise between three stags' heads couped Or. Supporters On either side a stag Proper gorged with a collar gemel Azure and standing on a fasces Or. Motto Celerite

== Judgments ==
- Creen v Wright (1875–76) LR 1 CPD 591
- Salomon v A Salomon & Co Ltd [1896] UKHL 1
- Trevor v Whitworth (1887) 12 App Cas 409; the House of Lords held that share buybacks were unlawful.
- British South Africa Co v Companhia de Moçambique [1893] AC 602; the House of Lords overturned a Court of Appeal decision and by so doing established the Mozambique rule, a common law rule in private international law that renders actions relating to title in foreign land, the right to possession of foreign land, and trespass to foreign land non-justiciable in common law jurisdictions.
- The Arrow Shipping Company v The Tyne Improvement Commissioners (or The Crystal) [1894] AC 509
- Mara v Browne (1895)
- McEntire v Crossley Brothers, 13 May 1895, applied in a later recharacterisation case, Welsh Development Agency v Export Finance Co Ltd. (1992)
- Provincial Fisheries Reference [1898] UKPC 30

== Bibliography ==
- Brewer, D. J. (1899) Journal of the Society of Comparative Legislation, July
- Fairbanks, C. W. (1899) Journal of the Society of Comparative Legislation, July
- William Gully, 1st Viscount Selby (1899) Law Quarterly Review, April
- Jacobs, J., & Lipkind, G. (1906) "Herschell, Lord Farrer", Jewish Encyclopedia, vol.VI, p.363
- James, H. (1899) Journal of the Society of Comparative Legislation, July
- Williamson, V. (1899) Journal of the Society of Comparative Legislation, July

Parliament of the United Kingdom
Preceded by Thomas Charles Thompson; John Henderson	Member of Parliament for City of Durham; 1874–1885; With: Sir Arthur Middleton to 1880; Thomas Charles Thompson from 1880	Succeeded by Thomas Milvain
Political offices
Preceded by Sir Hardinge Giffard	Solicitor General for England and Wales; 1880–1885	Succeeded by Sir John Eldon Gorst
Preceded by The Lord Halsbury	Lord High Chancellor of Great Britain; 1886	Succeeded by The Lord Halsbury
Preceded by The Lord Halsbury	Lord High Chancellor of Great Britain; 1892–1895	Succeeded by The Lord Halsbury
Academic offices
Preceded by The Earl of Derby	Chancellor of the University of London; 1893–1899	Succeeded by The Earl of Kimberley
Peerage of the United Kingdom
New creation	Baron Herschell; 1886–1899	Succeeded by Richard Herschell
