= Thomas Milvain =

English lawyer and Conservative politician

Thomas Milvain KC CB
- Milvain in 1901

Judge Advocate General
- In office 31 October 1905 – 7 October 1916
- Preceded by: Sir Francis Jeune
- Succeeded by: Sir Felix Cassel

Member of Parliament for Durham
- In office 1885–1892
- Preceded by: Thomas Charles Thompson; Farrer Herschell
- Succeeded by: Matthew Fowler

Member of Parliament for Hampstead
- In office 1902–1905
- Preceded by: Edward Brodie Hoare
- Succeeded by: John Fletcher

Personal details
- Born: 4 May 1844 Newcastle upon Tyne
- Died: 23 September 1916 (aged 73) Alnwick, Northumberland
- Party: Conservative
- Education: Trinity Hall, Cambridge

Sir Thomas Milvain KC CB (4 May 1844 – 13 September 1916) was an English lawyer and Conservative Party politician.

== Background and career ==
Milvain was the son of Henry Milvain of North Elswick Hall, Newcastle upon Tyne and his wife Jane Davidson, and was educated at Durham School and Trinity Hall, Cambridge, where he graduated with an LL.B. in 1866 and LL.M. in 1872. He was called to the bar at Middle Temple in 1869, and practiced on the North-Eastern Circuit.

In 1885 Milvain was elected Member of Parliament for Durham. He took silk in 1888, and after losing his parliament seat in 1892 was appointed Recorder of Bradford and Chancellor of the County Palatine of Durham. The following year, he was appointed a Bencher at Middle Temple.

He stood unsuccessfully in Cockermouth, Cumberland, in 1895, and in Maidstone at a by-election in 1901. The same year, he served as Chairman of the South African Compensation Commission. He was then elected MP for Hampstead at a by-election in January 1902.

Milvain gave up the seat in 1905 when he was appointed Judge Advocate General, a position that he held until his death in 1916. He was succeeded by Felix Cassel who had served as his deputy. In 1912, Milvain was appointed a Companion of the Order of the Bath and was knighted.

== Personal life ==
Milvain was an athletics blue in hurdles and won the National Championship over 120 yards hurdles at the 1866 AAC Championships.

He married Mary Alice Henderson on 28 January 1875, daughter of John Henderson, and they had one son, Colonel Henry Roland Milvain (1880–1960). He died at his house, Eglingham Hall, Alnwick, Northumberland on 23 September 1916 (aged 73).

Parliament of the United Kingdom
| Preceded by Thomas Charles Thompson; Farrer Herschell | Member of Parliament for Durham; 1885 – 1892 | Succeeded by Matthew Fowler |
| Preceded by Edward Brodie Hoare | Member of Parliament for Hampstead; 1902 – 1905 | Succeeded by John Fletcher |
Legal offices
| Preceded by Sir Francis Jeune | Judge Advocate General; 1905 – 1916 | Succeeded by Sir Felix Cassel |
