= Edward Hoare (cricketer) =

English cricketer

Edward Hoare (5 June 1812 – 7 July 1894) was an English cricketer with possibly amateur status who was active in 1831. He was born in Hampstead, London and died in Tunbridge Wells, Kent. He played one match for Cambridge University on 5 July 1831 against the Cambridge Town Club as an unknown handedness batsman whose bowling style is unknown. He scored three runs with a highest score of 3 and took no wickets.

A member of the Hoare banking family, he was also the nephew of the prison reformer Elizabeth Fry, who was his mother's sister. He was educated at Trinity College, Cambridge. He graduated from Cambridge University in 1834 as the fifth Wrangler and became a clergyman; he was a prominent member of the evangelical wing of the Church of England and wrote several books on religious themes. From 1853 he was vicar of Holy Trinity Church, Tunbridge Wells and an honorary canon of Canterbury Cathedral.

Edward Brodie Hoare, Member of Parliament for Hampstead, was his son.

== Bibliography ==
- Haygarth, Arthur (1996) [1862]. Scores & Biographies, Volume 1 (1744–1826). Kennington: Frederick Lillywhite. ISBN 978-19-00592-23-9.
- Haygarth, Arthur (1997) [1862]. Scores & Biographies, Volume 2 (1827–1840). Kennington: Frederick Lillywhite. ISBN 978-19-00592-23-9.
