= Sir Arthur Monck, 7th Baronet =

British MP

Sir Arthur Edward Middleton, M.P., 7th Baronet (12 January 1838 – 1 April 1933) was a British MP for the City of Durham.

He was born Arthur Edward Monck. His father was Charles Atticus Monck (1805–1856), son of Sir Charles Monck, 6th Baronet of Belsay Castle, Northumberland. His mother was Laura, daughter of Sir Matthew White Ridley (1778–1836) 3rd Baronet of Blagdon Hall, Northumberland. He attended Rugby School and matriculated at Trinity College, Cambridge in 1856. He received his B.A. in 1860 and was admitted to the Inner Temple on 5 April of the same year.

He succeeded to the Baronetcy of Belsay Castle on the death of his grandfather on 20 July 1867. He rebuilt the 1614 manor house and restored the pele tower with the help of architect Charles John Ferguson. His grandfather had changed his name from Middleton to Monck in 1799, and on 12 February 1876 the 7th Baronet and his brothers changed their name from Monck back to Middleton.

Middleton and Farrer Herschell were recruited to run for the Liberal Party after the 1874 general election in the City of Durham was voided on petition. He was elected as one of the two Members of Parliament at the 1874 by-election. He retired from the House of Commons at the 1880 general election. He later served as High Sheriff of Northumberland for 1884.

On 8 November 1871, he married Lady Constance Harriet Amherst, daughter of William Amherst, 2nd Earl Amherst. Middleton outlived his eldest son Gilbert (born 1873) and was succeeded by his son Sir Charles Middleton, 8th Baronet (1874–1942). He was the author of An Account of Belsay Castle in the County of Northumberland, published in 1910, and Sir Gilbert de Middleton and the Part he took in the Rebellion of the North in 1317, published in 1918.

Parliament of the United Kingdom
| Preceded by John Henderson; Thomas Charles Thompson | Member of Parliament for Durham; 1874–1880; With: Farrer Herschell | Succeeded by Farrer Herschell; Thomas Charles Thompson |
Baronetage of England
| Preceded by Charles Monck | Baronet (of Belsay Castle); 1867–1933 | Succeeded by Charles Middleton |
