= 1946 Cardiganshire County Council election =

1946 Welsh local election

The seventeenth election to Cardiganshire County Council took place in March 1946. It was preceded by the 1937 election with the scheduled 1940 and 1943 being postponed due to the Second World War, and followed by the 1949 election.

== Candidates ==
27 candidates were returned unopposed, all but three of whom were retiring members. This resulted in 23 contests, the largest number since 1922. The contested wards included five of the six wards at Aberystwyth, where very few contests had taken place in the inter-war period. While the overwhelming majority of candidates stood as Independents, there were four Labour candidates.

Eight aldermen retired, of whom four sought election.

== Outcome ==
The new council was composed entirely of Independents, apart from a sole Labour councillor who won a seat at Aberystwyth. However, there were a number of long-serving councillors who lost their seats, including three at Aberystwyth.

At Felinfach, Simon Davies, a retiring alderman, defeated Gwladys Davies of Llanllyr who had represented the ward since 1928.

== Results ==
=== Aberaeron ===
Aberaeron 1946
| Party | Candidate | Votes | % | ±% |
|---|---|---|---|---|
| Independent | Mary Nesta Poulgrain* | 385 | | |
| Independent | Evan John Thomas | 358 | | |
| Majority | | 27 | | |
| Independent hold | | Swing | | |

=== Aberbanc ===
Aberbanc 1946
| Party | Candidate | Votes | % | ±% |
|---|---|---|---|---|
| Independent | Benjamin John Davies | 536 | | |
| Independent | Ieuan John Luke* | 465 | | |
| Majority | | 61 | | |
| Independent gain from Independent | | Swing | | |

=== Aberporth ===
Aberporth 1946
| Party | Candidate | Votes | % | ±% |
|---|---|---|---|---|
| Independent | Rev Evan Melinfab Lewis* | 620 | | |
| Independent | John N. Thomas | 214 | | |
| Majority | | 406 | | |
| Independent hold | | Swing | | |

=== Aberystwyth Division 1 ===
Aberystwyth Division 1 1946
| Party | Candidate | Votes | % | ±% |
|---|---|---|---|---|
| Labour | John John | 464 | | |
| Independent | Miss L. Winstanley | 228 | | |
| Majority | | 236 | | |
| Labour gain from Independent | | Swing | | |

=== Aberystwyth Division 2 ===
Aberystwyth Division 2 1946
| Party | Candidate | Votes | % | ±% |
|---|---|---|---|---|
| Independent | Gwendoline Calan Evans | Unopposed | | |
| Independent hold | | Swing | | |

=== Aberystwyth Division 3 ===
Aberystwyth Division 3 1946
| Party | Candidate | Votes | % | ±% |
|---|---|---|---|---|
| Independent | Mrs C.M. Lewis Evans* | 386 | | |
| Independent | J. Barclay Jenkins+ | 117 | | |
| Majority | | 269 | | |
| Independent hold | | Swing | | |

=== Aberystwyth Division 4 ===
Aberystwyth Division 4 1946
| Party | Candidate | Votes | % | ±% |
|---|---|---|---|---|
| Independent | Richard Ellis | 488 | | |
| Labour | Daniel Davies | 344 | | |
| Independent | T.C. Jenkins* | 72 | | |
| Majority | | 144 | | |
| Independent hold | | Swing | | |

=== Aberystwyth Division 5 ===
Aberystwyth Division 5 1946
| Party | Candidate | Votes | % | ±% |
|---|---|---|---|---|
| Independent | Emlyn Abraham-Williams* | 399 | | |
| Independent | Gwendolen Eluned Jones | 194 | | |
| Majority | | 205 | | |
| Independent hold | | Swing | | |

=== Aberystwyth Division 6 ===
Aberystwyth Division 6 1946
| Party | Candidate | Votes | % | ±% |
|---|---|---|---|---|
| Independent | J. Eric Edwards | 241 | | |
| Independent | Llewellyn Samuel* | 202 | | |
| Labour | E. Treharne | 122 | | |
| Majority | | 39 | | |
| Independent hold | | Swing | | |

=== Aeron ===
Aeron 1946
| Party | Candidate | Votes | % | ±% |
|---|---|---|---|---|
| Independent | E. Glyn Davies* | Unopposed | | |
| Independent hold | | Swing | | |

=== Borth ===
Borth 1946
| Party | Candidate | Votes | % | ±% |
|---|---|---|---|---|
| Independent | Rev J. Bowden Thomas | 288 | | |
| Independent | Jesse Matthews | 286 | | |
| Independent | Stanley Owen Williams | 202 | | |
| Majority | | 2 | | |
| Independent hold | | Swing | | |

=== Bow Street ===
Bow Street 1946
| Party | Candidate | Votes | % | ±% |
|---|---|---|---|---|
| Independent | D. Rees Morgan+ | Unopposed | | |
| Independent hold | | Swing | | |

=== Cardigan North ===
Cardigan North 1946
| Party | Candidate | Votes | % | ±% |
|---|---|---|---|---|
| Independent | Jenkins Richards | Unopposed | | |
| Independent hold | | Swing | | |

=== Cardigan South ===
Cardigan South 1946
| Party | Candidate | Votes | % | ±% |
|---|---|---|---|---|
| Independent | R.L. Phillips | 407 | | |
| Independent | Arthur Thomas* | 339 | | |
| Majority | | 68 | | |
| Independent gain from Independent | | Swing | | |

=== Cilcennin ===
Cilcennin 1946
| Party | Candidate | Votes | % | ±% |
|---|---|---|---|---|
| Independent | Evan Evans* | Unopposed | | |
| Independent hold | | Swing | | |

=== Cwmrheidol ===
Cwmrheidol 1946
| Party | Candidate | Votes | % | ±% |
|---|---|---|---|---|
| Independent | John Morgan+ | 179 | | |
| Independent | Isaac Richard Howells | 120 | | |
| Majority | | 59 | | |
| Independent hold | | Swing | | |

=== Devil's Bridge ===
Devil's Bridge 1946
| Party | Candidate | Votes | % | ±% |
|---|---|---|---|---|
| Independent | Rev David Lewis Evans | Unopposed | | |
| Independent hold | | Swing | | |

=== Felinfach ===
Felinfach 1946
| Party | Candidate | Votes | % | ±% |
|---|---|---|---|---|
| Independent | Simon Davies+ | 339 | | |
| Independent | Dan Lloyd | 262 | | |
| Independent | Gladys Mary Douglas* | 131 | | |
| Majority | | 77 | | |
| Independent gain from Independent | | Swing | | |

=== Goginan ===
Goginan 1946
| Party | Candidate | Votes | % | ±% |
|---|---|---|---|---|
| Independent | John Williams* | Unopposed | | |
| Independent hold | | Swing | | |

=== Lampeter Borough ===
Lampeter Borough 1946
| Party | Candidate | Votes | % | ±% |
|---|---|---|---|---|
| Independent | William Lewis* | Unopposed | | |
| Independent hold | | Swing | | |

=== Llanarth ===
Llanarth 1946
| Party | Candidate | Votes | % | ±% |
|---|---|---|---|---|
| Independent | Rev J.M. Lloyd Thomas* | Unopposed | | |
| Independent hold | | Swing | | |

=== Llanbadarn Fawr ===
Llanbadarn Fawr 1946
| Party | Candidate | Votes | % | ±% |
|---|---|---|---|---|
| Independent | Emile Thomas Evans* | Unopposed | | |
| Independent hold | | Swing | | |

=== Llanddewi Brefi ===
Llanddewi Brefi 1946
| Party | Candidate | Votes | % | ±% |
|---|---|---|---|---|
| Independent | William Morgan Davies* | Unopposed | | |
| Independent hold | | Swing | | |

=== Llandygwydd ===
Llandygwydd 1946
| Party | Candidate | Votes | % | ±% |
|---|---|---|---|---|
| Independent | David James* | Unopposed | | |
| Independent hold | | Swing | | |

=== Llandysul North ===
Llandysul North 1946
| Party | Candidate | Votes | % | ±% |
|---|---|---|---|---|
| Independent | Josiah Richard Jones* | 308 | | |
| Independent | Griffith Davies | 303 | | |
| Majority | | 5 | | |
| Independent hold | | Swing | | |

=== Llandysul South ===
Llandysul South 1946
| Party | Candidate | Votes | % | ±% |
|---|---|---|---|---|
| Independent | Edward Lewis* | Unopposed | | |
| Independent hold | | Swing | | |

=== Llansysiliogogo ===
Llandysiliogogo 1946
| Party | Candidate | Votes | % | ±% |
|---|---|---|---|---|
| Independent | Rees Williams* | Unopposed | | |
| Independent hold | | Swing | | |

=== Llanfair Clydogau ===
Llanfair Clydogau 1946
| Party | Candidate | Votes | % | ±% |
|---|---|---|---|---|
| Independent | Joseph Gwyn Evans* | 297 | | |
| Independent | D.O. Morgan | 274 | | |
| Majority | | 23 | | |
| Independent hold | | Swing | | |

=== Llanfarian ===
Llanfarian 1946
| Party | Candidate | Votes | % | ±% |
|---|---|---|---|---|
| Independent | William Zadrach Jones* | Unopposed | | |
| Independent hold | | Swing | | |

=== Llanfihangel y Creuddyn ===
Llanfihangel y Creuddyn 1946
| Party | Candidate | Votes | % | ±% |
|---|---|---|---|---|
| Independent | John Daniel Evans* | Unopposed | | |
| Independent hold | | Swing | | |

=== Llangoedmor ===
Llangoedmor 1946
| Party | Candidate | Votes | % | ±% |
|---|---|---|---|---|
| Independent | Evan Davies* | Unopposed | | |
| Independent hold | | Swing | | |

=== Llangeitho ===
Llangeitho 1946
| Party | Candidate | Votes | % | ±% |
|---|---|---|---|---|
| Independent | Daniel Lodwick Herbert* | Unopposed | | |
| Independent hold | | Swing | | |

=== Llangrannog ===
Llangrannog 1946
| Party | Candidate | Votes | % | ±% |
|---|---|---|---|---|
| Independent | Evan Richard Jones* | Unopposed | | |
| Independent hold | | Swing | | |

=== Llanilar ===
Llanilar 1946
| Party | Candidate | Votes | % | ±% |
|---|---|---|---|---|
| Independent | David Price Thomas | 335 | | |
| Independent | D.C. Morgan | 219 | | |
| Majority | | 116 | | |
| Independent hold | | Swing | | |

=== Llanrhystyd ===
Llanrhystyd 1946
| Party | Candidate | Votes | % | ±% |
|---|---|---|---|---|
| Independent | D. Alban Davies* | Unopposed | | |
| Independent hold | | Swing | | |

=== Llanllwchaiarn ===
Llanllwchaiarn 1946
| Party | Candidate | Votes | % | ±% |
|---|---|---|---|---|
| Independent | David Owen Williams* | 286 | | |
| Independent | J. Davies | 103 | | |
| Majority | | 183 | | |
| Independent hold | | Swing | | |

=== Llansantffraed ===
Llansantffraed 1946
| Party | Candidate | Votes | % | ±% |
|---|---|---|---|---|
| Independent | Capt. David Morgan* | Unopposed | | |
| Independent hold | | Swing | | |

=== Llanwnen ===
Llanwnen 1946
| Party | Candidate | Votes | % | ±% |
|---|---|---|---|---|
| Independent | William Grey Hughes | 247 | | |
| Independent | John Evans* | 151 | | |
| Majority | | 97 | | |
| Independent gain from Independent | | Swing | | |

=== Llanwenog ===
Llanwenog 1946
| Party | Candidate | Votes | % | ±% |
|---|---|---|---|---|
| Independent | David Lloyd James* | Unopposed | | |
| Independent hold | | Swing | | |

=== Lledrod ===
Lledrod 1946
| Party | Candidate | Votes | % | ±% |
|---|---|---|---|---|
| Independent | Owen James Owen* | Unopposed | | |
| Independent hold | | Swing | | |

=== Nantcwnlle ===
Nantcwnlle 1946
| Party | Candidate | Votes | % | ±% |
|---|---|---|---|---|
| Independent | John Edwardes Rogers Lewis* | Unopposed | | |
| Independent hold | | Swing | | |

=== New Quay ===
New Quay 1946
| Party | Candidate | Votes | % | ±% |
|---|---|---|---|---|
| Independent | David Oswald Davies | 318 | | |
| Independent | Jack Evans | 287 | | |
| Majority | | 31 | | |
| Independent hold | | Swing | | |

=== Penbryn ===
Penbryn 1946
| Party | Candidate | Votes | % | ±% |
|---|---|---|---|---|
| Independent | David Lloyd Thomas* | | | |
| Independent | Morgan Lloyd Jenkins | | | |
| Majority | | | | |
| Independent hold | | Swing | | |

=== Strata Florida ===
Strata Florida 1946
| Party | Candidate | Votes | % | ±% |
|---|---|---|---|---|
| Independent | Morgan Jones* | Unopposed | | |
| Independent hold | | Swing | | |

=== Taliesin ===
Taliesin 1946
| Party | Candidate | Votes | % | ±% |
|---|---|---|---|---|
| Independent | Mrs A.D.L. Evans* | 226 | | |
| Independent | John Oliver | 214 | | |
| Majority | | 12 | | |
| Independent hold | | Swing | | |

=== Talybont ===
Talybont 1946
| Party | Candidate | Votes | % | ±% |
|---|---|---|---|---|
| Independent | Rev Fred Jones* | Unopposed | | |
| Independent hold | | Swing | | |

=== Trefeurig ===
Trefeurig 1946
| Party | Candidate | Votes | % | ±% |
|---|---|---|---|---|
| Independent | Richard Rowland Davies* | 147 | | |
| Independent | William James | 107 | | |
| Majority | | 40 | | |
| Independent hold | | Swing | | |

=== Tregaron ===
Tregaron 1946
| Party | Candidate | Votes | % | ±% |
|---|---|---|---|---|
| Independent | Rev David Thomas Jones | 437 | | |
| Independent | D.J. Edwards* | 278 | | |
| Majority | | 159 | | |
| Independent gain from Independent | | Swing | | |

=== Troedyraur ===
Troedyraur 1946
| Party | Candidate | Votes | % | ±% |
|---|---|---|---|---|
| Independent | B.J. Davies* | 347 | | |
| Independent | T.L. Morris | 335 | | |
| Majority | | 12 | | |
| Independent hold | | Swing | | |

=== Ysbyty Ystwyth ===
Ysbyty Ystwyth 1946
| Party | Candidate | Votes | % | ±% |
|---|---|---|---|---|
| Independent | Evan Richard Edwards* | Unopposed | | |
| Independent hold | | Swing | | |

== Election of Aldermen ==
In addition to the 50 councillors the council consisted of 16 county aldermen. Aldermen were elected by the council, and served a six-year term. Following the 1946 election, there were eight aldermanic vacancies which were filled at the annual meeting. Those elected included only one retiring alderman and the first woman ever appointed in the county.

The following retiring aldermen was re-elected:

- D.R. Morgan, Bow Street

In addition, the following seven new aldermen were elected:

- Mrs C.M. Evans, Aberystwyth
- John Williams, Goginan
- Morgan Jones, Strat Florida
- Josiah R. Jones, Llandysul
- Rees Williams, Llwyndafydd
- Capt D. Morgan, Llannon
- David James, Llwyndyrus

The following retiring aldermen had been re-elected as members of the council but were not re-elected as aldermen:

- Simon Davies, Felinfach

Of the newly elected aldermen, Josiah Jones had previously served as alderman from 1922 until 1934.

== By-elections ==
Six contested by-elections were held following the election of aldermen.

=== Aberystwyth Division 3 by-election ===
Aberystwyth Division 3 by-election 1946
| Party | Candidate | Votes | % | ±% |
|---|---|---|---|---|
| Independent | Enoch James Morgan | 306 | | |
| Labour | Daniel Davies | 173 | | |
| Majority | | 133 | | |
| Independent hold | | Swing | | |

=== Bow Street by-election ===
Bow Street by-election 1946
| Party | Candidate | Votes | % | ±% |
|---|---|---|---|---|
| Independent | Bodin Trevor Williams | Unopposed | | |
| Independent hold | | Swing | | |

=== Goginan by-election ===
Goginan by-election 1946
| Party | Candidate | Votes | % | ±% |
|---|---|---|---|---|
| Independent | Isaac Richard Lewis | 309 | | |
| Independent | W.G. Davies | 188 | | |
| Majority | | 121 | | |
| Independent hold | | Swing | | |

=== Llandygwydd by-election ===
Llandygwydd by-election 1946
| Party | Candidate | Votes | % | ±% |
|---|---|---|---|---|
| Independent | Edward Lloyd Davies | 395 | | |
| Independent | David Jones | 160 | | |
| Majority | | 235 | | |
| Independent hold | | Swing | | |

=== Llandysiliogogo by-election ===
Llandysiliogogo by-election 1946
| Party | Candidate | Votes | % | ±% |
|---|---|---|---|---|
| Independent | Ben Thomas | 300 | | |
| Independent | Evan Davies | 212 | | |
| Majority | | 88 | | |
| Independent hold | | Swing | | |

=== Llansantffraed by-election ===
Llansantffraed by-election 1946
| Party | Candidate | Votes | % | ±% |
|---|---|---|---|---|
| Independent | John Dewi Morgan | 263 | | |
| Independent | John James Jones | 235 | | |
| Majority | | 28 | | |
| Independent hold | | Swing | | |

=== Strata Florida by-election ===
Strata Florida by-election 1946
| Party | Candidate | Votes | % | ±% |
|---|---|---|---|---|
| Independent | Emrys S. Lloyd | 299 | | |
| Independent | Joseph Morgan Hughes | 208 | | |
| Majority | | 91 | | |
| Independent hold | | Swing | | |
