= Rognvald Herschell, 3rd Baron Herschell =

British hereditary peer and politician

Rognvald Richard Farrer Herschell, 3rd Baron Herschell (13 September 1923 – 26 October 2008) was a British hereditary peer and politician.

== Life ==
He succeeded his father to the peerage in 1929, and thus enjoyed his peerage for 79 years. He lost his right to sit in the House of Lords upon passage of the House of Lords Act 1999 which disqualified most hereditary peers from an automatic seat.

Herschell was the only son of Richard Herschell, 2nd Baron Herschell, and Vera, daughter of Sir Arthur Nicolson, 10th Baronet, and was educated at Eton College. He was a Page of Honour to the king from 1935 to 1940 and was a train bearer at the coronation of King George VI and Queen Elizabeth in 1937. A captain in the Coldstream Guards, Lord Herschell fought in the Second World War from 1942 to 1945. Despite being entitled to a seat in the House of Lords between 1944 and 1999, he never took his seat.

== Family ==
Lord Herschell married Lady Heather, daughter of Humphry Legge, 8th Earl of Dartmouth, in 1948. They had one daughter, the Hon. Arabella Jane (born 1955), who is married to Sir John Kiszely. Herschell died in October 2008, aged 85, when the barony became extinct.

== Arms ==
Coat of arms of Rognvald Herschell, 3rd Baron Herschell
Crest On a mount Vert a stag Proper gorged with a collar gemel Azure the dexter forefoot supporting a fasces in bend Or. Escutcheon Per fess Azure and Sable a fasces fesswise between three stags’ heads couped Or. Supporters On either side a stag Proper gorged with a collar gemel Azure and standing on a fasces Or. Motto Celerite

Peerage of the United Kingdom
Preceded by Richard Herschell	Baron Herschell; 1929–2008	Extinct
