= Edward Brodie Hoare =

British banker and politician

Hoare in 1895.

Edward Brodie Hoare (30 October 1841 – 12 August 1911) was a British banker and Conservative Party politician.

Born in Richmond, Surrey, he was the eldest son of the Reverend Edward Hoare, Honorary Canon of Canterbury and vicar of Holy Trinity, Tunbridge Wells, and his wife Maria, daughter of Sir Benjamin Collins Brodie, Baronet. Educated at Tonbridge School and Trinity College, Cambridge, he graduated with a BA degree in 1864 and MA in 1868.

He married Katharine Parry, daughter of Rear Admiral Sir William Edward Parry in 1868.

He pursued a long career in banking, initially as a partner in the family firm of Barnett, Hoare and Company. He was subsequently a director of Lloyds Bank, chairman of the Colonial Bank, and a director of the Standard Bank of South Africa.

Active in Unionist politics, he unsuccessfully contested Sheffield Attercliffe at the 1886 general election and Bradford Central at a byelection in 1886 before being elected Conservative Member of Parliament for Hampstead in a by-election in 1888. He remained Hampstead's MP until 9 January 1902, when he resigned due to ill-health and was ceremonially appointed Steward and Bailiff of the Chiltern Hundreds.

In August 1911 Hoare was killed aged 69 when the motor car in which he was travelling was involved in an accident near Sevenoaks, Kent.

Parliament of the United Kingdom
Preceded by Sir Henry Holland	Member of Parliament for Hampstead; 1888 – 1902	Succeeded by Thomas Milvain
