= George Balfour (Conservative politician) =

British politician (1872–1941)

George Balfour MP
- Balfour in 1928
- Born: 1872; Portsmouth
- Died: 26 September 1941 (aged 68–69)
- Engineering career
- Discipline: Mechanical engineering

George Balfour (1872 – 26 September 1941) was a British Conservative Party politician and engineer. He was of Scottish parentage where he also spent part of his upbringing but was born in Portsmouth, England. He served his long parliamentary career representing a constituency in the County of London and lived much of his life in England.

== Career ==
George Balfour joined the Blackness Foundry in Dundee as an apprentice in 1888. He subsequently qualified as a mechanical and electrical engineer. In 1909, together with Andrew Beatty, an English accountant, he founded Balfour Beatty which was to become an international construction business. Under his leadership the company installed a new tramway system in Dunfermline in Fife. The two partners also founded Power Securities, a business established to pursue opportunities in hydro-electric power, in 1922. He was vice-chairman in 1929 and chairman in 1938 of the Lancashire Electric Power Company.

== Political life ==
From 1918 to 1941, Balfour sat as member of parliament (MP) for Hampstead. He contributed to many debates on employment issues.

== Death ==
Balfour died on 26 September 1941 at which time he was still a serving MP.

== Honours ==
In 2020 he was inducted into the Scottish Engineering Hall of Fame.

Parliament of the United Kingdom
Preceded by John Fletcher	Member of Parliament for Hampstead; 1918 – 1941	Succeeded by Charles Challen
