= Baron Herschell =

Title in the Peerage of the United Kingdom

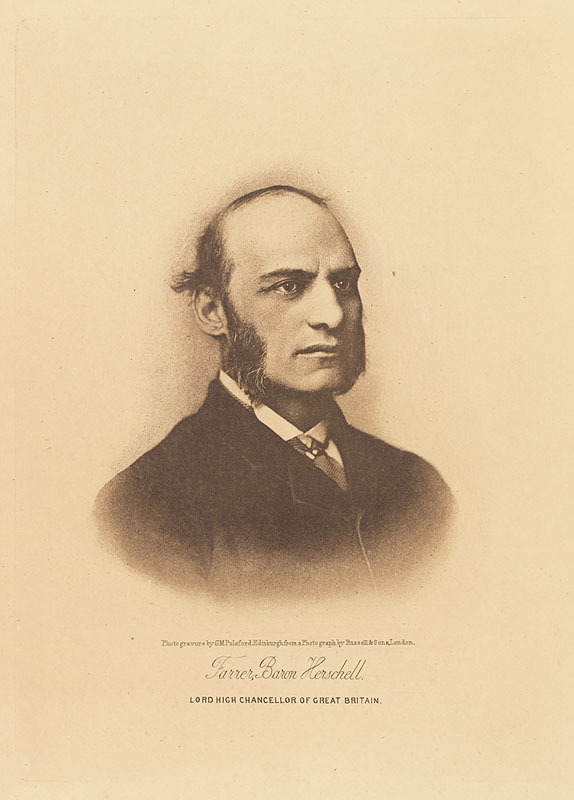
Farrer Herschell, 1st Baron Herschell

Baron Herschell, of the City of Durham, was a title in the Peerage of the United Kingdom. It was created on 8 February 1886 for the lawyer and Liberal politician Sir Farrer Herschell. He served as Lord Chancellor in 1886 and from 1892 to 1895. The title became extinct on the death of his grandson, the third Baron, in 2008.

Ridley Haim Herschell was the father of the first Baron.

== Barons Herschell (1886) ==
- Farrer Herschell, 1st Baron Herschell (1837–1899)
- Richard Farrer Herschell, 2nd Baron Herschell (1878–1929)
- Rognvald Richard Farrer Herschell, 3rd Baron Herschell (1923–2008)

== Arms ==
Coat of arms of Baron Herschell
Crest On a mount Vert a stag Proper gorged with a collar gemel Azure the dexter forefoot supporting a fasces in bend Or. Escutcheon Per fess Azure and Sable a fasces fesswise between three stags’ heads couped Or. Supporters On either side a stag Proper gorged with a collar gemel Azure and standing on a fasces Or. Motto Celerite
