= Hampstead Central (ward) =

- Former electoral ward for the Camden London Borough Council
- Borough: Camden
- County: Greater London
- Population: 11,480 (1966)
- Electorate: 8,159 (1964); 9,074 (1968)
- Area: 280.6 acres (113.6 ha)

Former electoral ward
- Created: 1965
- Abolished: 1971
- Councillors: 3

Hampstead Central was an electoral ward in the London Borough of Camden from 1965 to 1971. It was first used at the 1964 elections and last used at the 1968 elections. It returned three councillors to Camden London Borough Council.

== List of councillors ==
Term	Councillor	Party
1964–1968	William Evans	Conservative
1964–1971	Sidney Torrance	Conservative
1964–1971	Geoffrey Finsberg	Conservative
1968–1971	Ronald King	Conservative

== Camden council elections ==
External image
- Hampstead Central ward boundaries from 1965 to 1971

=== 1968 election ===
The election took place on 9 May 1968.

1968 Camden London Borough Council election: Hampstead Central (3)
Party	Candidate	Votes	%	±%
Conservative	Geoffrey Finsberg	1,965	64.2	
Conservative	Sidney Torrance	1,937		
Conservative	Ronald King	1,909		
Labour	Peter Stephenson	764	24.6	
Labour	Barry Peskin	740		
Labour	James Hill	724		
Liberal	Kenneth Carter	344	11.2	
Liberal	Alison Snow	343		
Liberal	Jillian Vasey	328		
Turnout			34.2	
Conservative hold		Swing		
Conservative hold		Swing		
Conservative hold		Swing		

=== 1964 election ===
The election took place on 7 May 1964.

1964 Camden London Borough Council election: Hampstead Central (3)
Party	Candidate	Votes	%	±%
Conservative	William Evans	1,596		
Conservative	Sidney Torrance	1,594		
Conservative	Geoffrey Finsberg	1,577		
Labour	Nancy Silverman	928		
Labour	Henry Totten	911		
Labour	Philip Turner	872		
Liberal	Michael Watson	382		
Liberal	Mary Barling	380		
Liberal	David Sacker	374		
Turnout		2,887	35.3	
Conservative win (new seat)				
Conservative win (new seat)				
Conservative win (new seat)				
