= 1949 United Kingdom local elections =

← 1948	4 to 9 April 1949	1950 →
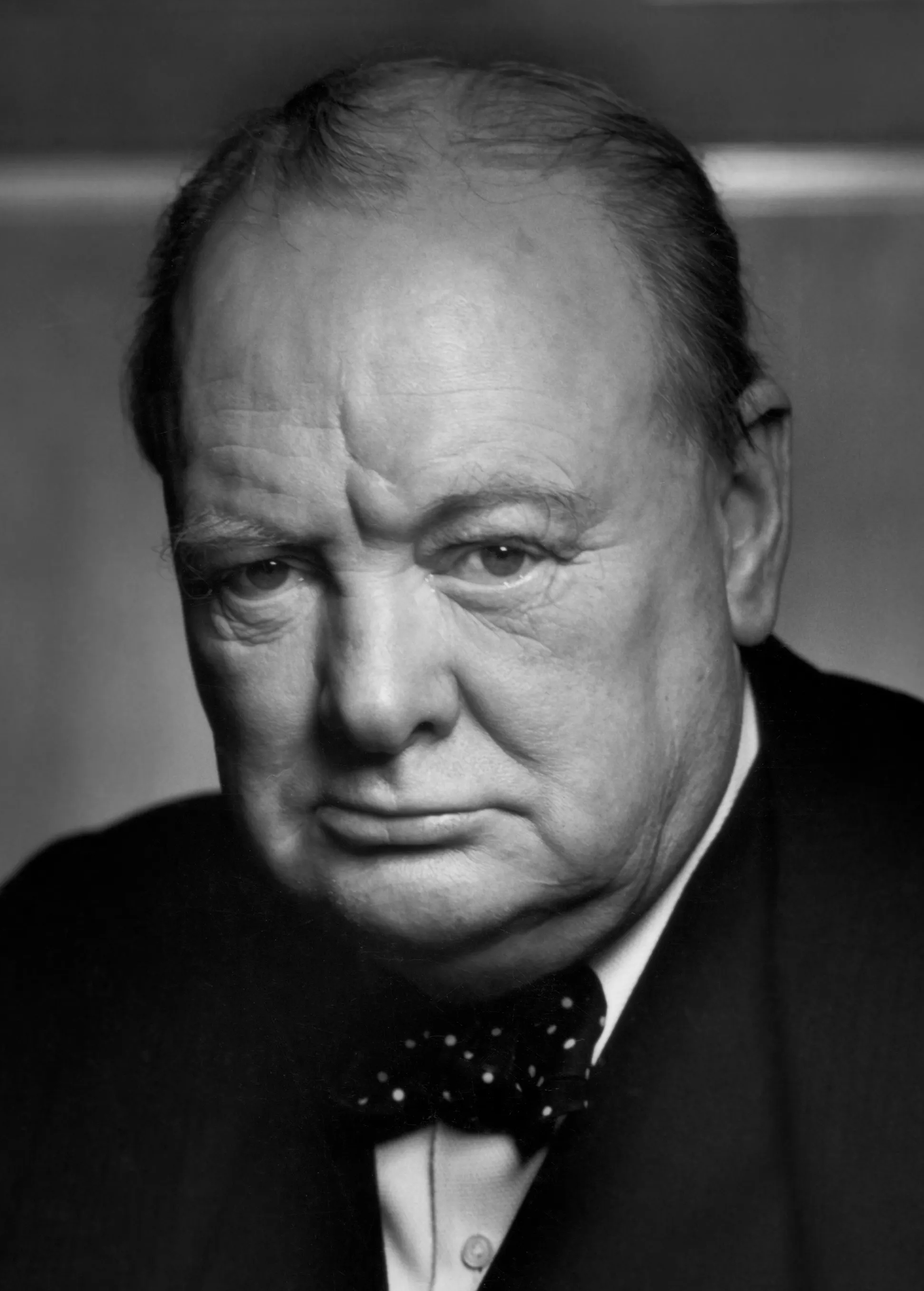

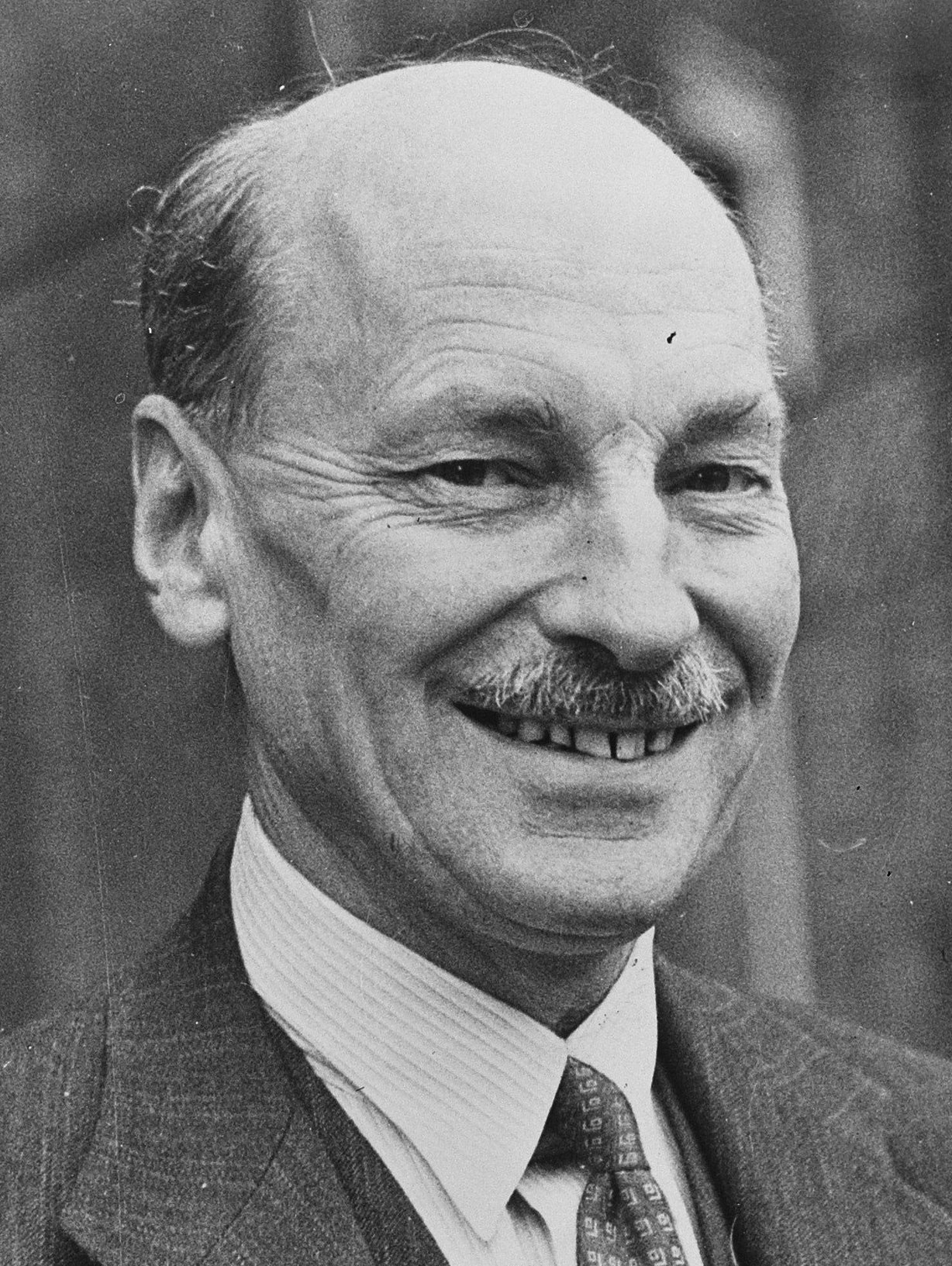

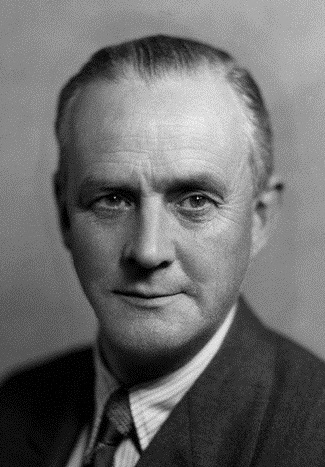
	Majority party	Minority party	Third party
Leader	Winston Churchill	Clement Attlee	Clement Davies
Party	Conservative	Labour	Liberal
Leader since	9 October 1940	25 October 1935	2 August 1945
Seat change	▲341	▲50	▼24
Councillors	982	854	97

1949 United Kingdom local elections were held from 4 to 9 April 1949. The County Council elections resulted in gains for both the governing Labour Party and opposition Conservative Party at the Liberals' expense. However, Labour suffered heavy losses in the Borough elections.

A remarkable feature of the elections was the tossup in the London County Council between Labour and the Conservatives, who each won 64 seats, with the Liberals retaining one seat, that of Sir Percy Harris in Bethnal Green.

Outside London, Labour lost council control of Middlesex, Essex, Northumberland, and the West Riding of Yorkshire; retained control of Derbyshire, Durham, Glamorgan, Monmouthshire, and Nottinghamshire, but won Carmarthenshire, the only county gained by Labour.

== Background ==
County Councils were introduced in England and Wales on 22 September 1889 by the Local Government Act 1888. County councils were responsible for their area's strategic services, with smaller urban district councils and rural district councils responsible for other activities. The writ of the county councils did not extend everywhere: county boroughs were independent of the council for the county in which they were geographically situated, and county borough councils exercised the functions of both county councils and district councils.

== 1949 County Council election results ==
The England and Wales County Council elections were held the week of 4–9 April 1949. Prior to 1949 local elections were held in November, so those councillors who were due to retire in November 1948 had their terms extended to April 1949. (Local elections were later moved to the first Thursday of May.) Of the total of 3,879 vacant seats in the 62 counties in which elections were held, about half (1,938) the councillors were returned unopposed, whilst 1,941 seats were contested. The table below, compiled by The Times newspaper, summarises the results, showing candidates returned, and individual gains and losses.

Summary of results

Party	Councillors		
Party	Gains	Losses	Total elected
Conservative Party	360	19	982
Labour Party	69	19	854
Liberal Party	10	34	97
Independents (with Conservative support)	123	61	828
Independents	40	101	1,003
Communist Party of Great Britain	0	7	0

=== County Council Control ===
==== England ====
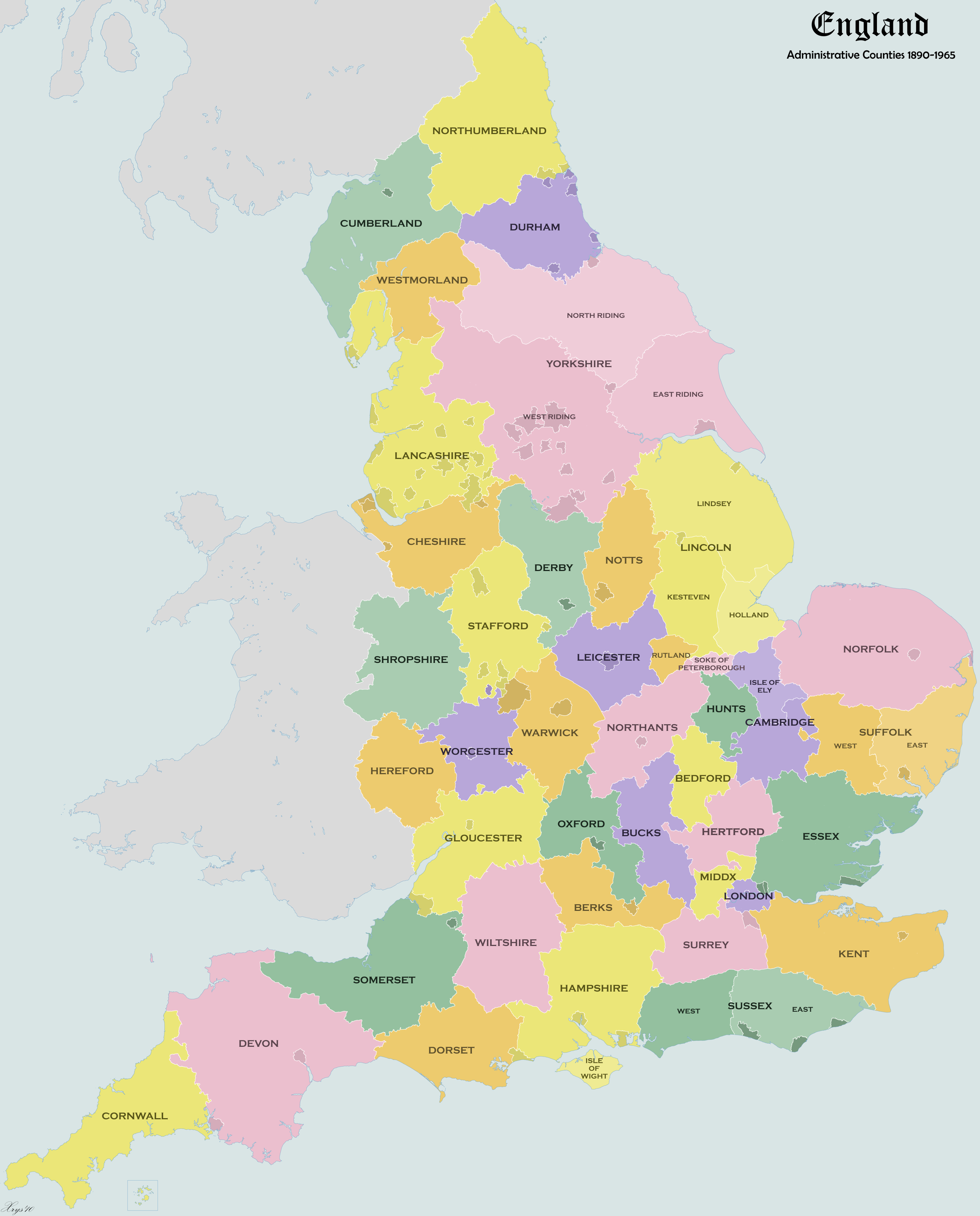
Map of County & Borough Councils in England

Council	Previous control	Result	Details
Bedfordshire			Details
Berkshire			Details
Buckinghamshire			Details
Cambridgeshire			Details
Cheshire			Details
Cornwall			Details
Cumberland			Details
Derbyshire	Labour	Labour	Details
Devon			Details
Dorset			Details
Durham	Labour	Labour	Details
East Suffolk			Details
East Sussex			Details
Essex	Labour		Details
Gloucestershire			Details
Hampshire			Details
Herefordshire			Details
Hertfordshire			Details
Holland			Details
Huntingdonshire			Details
Isle of Ely			Details
Kent			Details
Kesteven	Independent	Independent	Details
Lancashire			Details
Leicestershire			Details
Lindsey			Details
London	Labour	No overall control	Details
Middlesex	Labour	Conservative	Details
Northumberland	Labour		Details
Nottinghamshire	Labour		Details
East Riding			Details
North Riding			Details
West Riding	Labour	No overall control	Details
Staffordshire		No overall control	Details
West Suffolk			Details
West Sussex			Details
Westmorland			Details
Wiltshire			Details
Worcestershire			Details

==== Wales ====
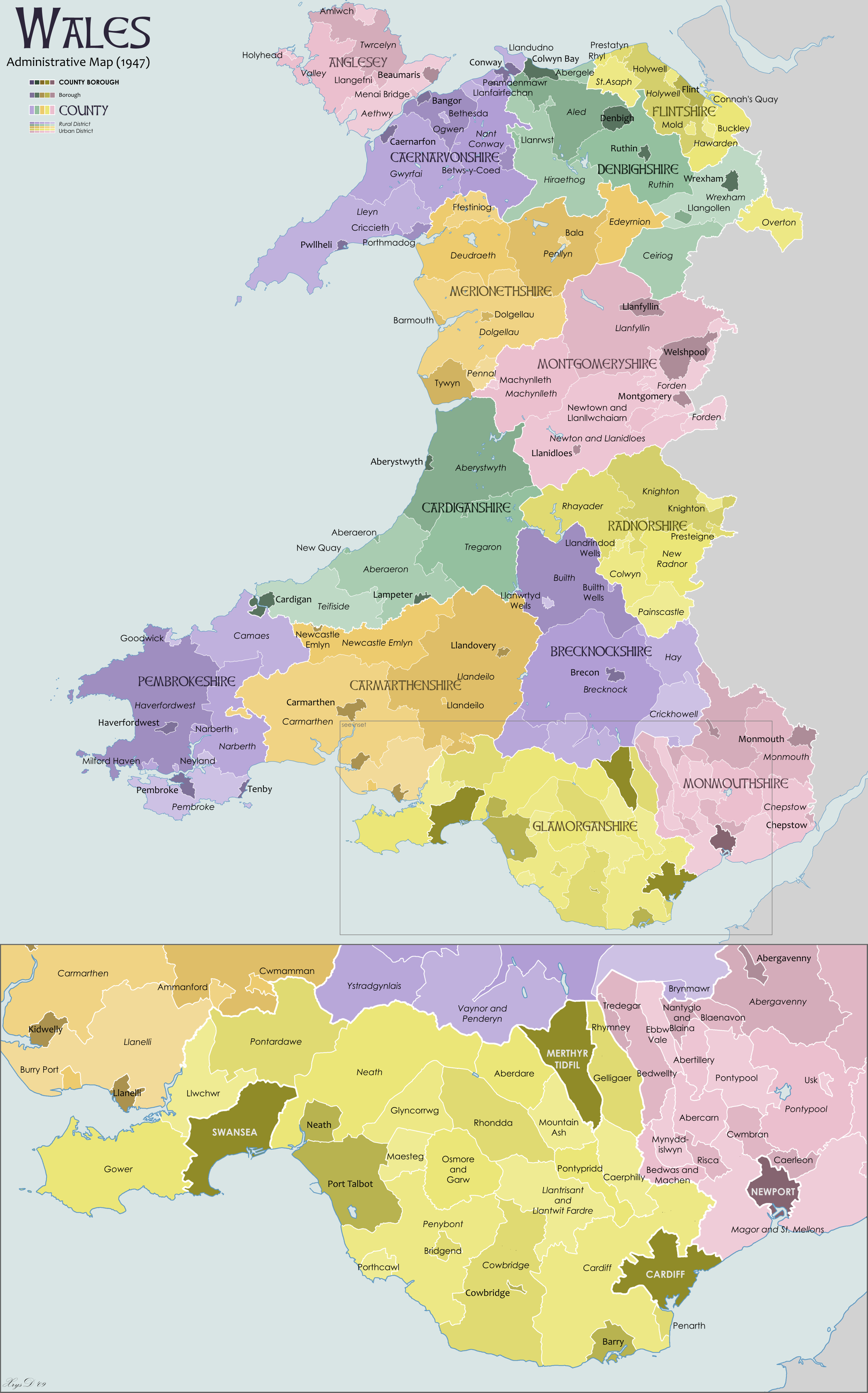
Map of Welsh local government divisions.

Council	Previous control	Result	Details
Anglesey			Details
Brecknockshire			Details
Carnarvonshire			Details
Cardiganshire			Details
Carmarthenshire	Independent	Labour	Details
Denbighshire			Details
Flintshire			Details
Glamorgan	Labour	Labour	Details
Merionethshire			Details
Monmouthshire	Labour	Labour	Details
Montgomeryshire			Details
Pembrokeshire			Details
Radnorshire			Details

== 1949 Borough elections ==
There were also local elections in urban district councils, rural district councils, Municipal boroughs in London and 392 cities and towns in England and Wales in May 1949. These showed a similar advance in Conservative support to that recorded in the County Council elections.

Summary of results
The results for the boroughs outside London were:

Party	Councillors			
Party	Gains	Losses	% Gains	% Losses
Conservative Party	560	24	96%	4%
Labour Party	77	530	13%	87%
Liberal Party	19	40	32%	68%
Independents	121	181	40%	60%
Communist Party of Great Britain	0	2	0	100%

== By-elections in 1949 ==
There were six Parliamentary by-elections held in 1949. All were in Labour held seats and all were retained by Labour but each one showed a movement of votes away from Labour and towards the Conservatives. Cook and Ramsden comment however that there was relatively little in these by-election results to indicate the extent to which the Tories would recover lost ground in the 1950 general election. However the first by-election to be held after the county and other local elections, in West Leeds on 21 July 1949, showed the largest swing to the Conservatives in any Parliamentary contest for the previous nine months. Despite the assessment by Cook & Ramsden that the by-elections of 1949 offered little indication that the Tories would do so well in 1950, taken together with the county and other local results, a clear pattern of dissatisfaction with the Labour government can be discerned and a willingness by the electorate to turn again towards the Conservatives.

== General election prospects ==
After the Second World War local elections came to be accepted increasingly as barometers of the national political mood. The combined County and Borough election results offered a useful snapshot of public opinion as the Labour government elected in 1945 neared the end of its term of office.

=== Conservative reaction ===
The influential Conservative peer, Lord Woolton who was chairman of the Tory party between 1946 and 1955, commented that the elections had taken place on a national scale and in effect constituted a miniature general election, indicating how opinion had changed in the country since 1945. The Conservatives especially took heart from the results. Tory leader Winston Churchill told a rally at the Royal Albert Hall that the County Council contests had seen great Conservative victories and there was a prospect of more to come. He forecast that the next general election would be ‘one of the most memorable’. Anthony Eden told the same meeting that the election results showed the electorate were moving towards the Conservative approaches of lower taxation, halting further nationalisations, providing incentives and the revival of the virtue of thrift.

=== Labour reaction ===
For Labour, Herbert Morrison told supporters that it was inevitable that Labour would be unable to hold on to the gains it had made in the exceptional years of 1945–46. He said that Labour would have to learn the lessons of the election results, particularly tactical ones about how and in which constituencies the Tories chose to fight the hardest and put the greatest resources. This was a theme taken up in The Times leader of 14 May 1949 when it was commented that the Conservative Party machine had made great strides under Lord Woolton's direction and was now capable of enthusing its supporters and getting them to the polls in great numbers. However, in policy terms Morrison seemed reluctant to learn lessons, saying Labour needed more of the same and arguing for further attacks on ‘powerful vested interests’ to transform great private economic interests into public concerns, a call for more nationalisation and state regulation.

=== Liberal reaction ===
As for the Liberals, they had read the writing on the wall. In late 1949 they persuaded Lloyd's of London to insure their candidates’ deposits for the next general election. For the sum of £5,000 Lloyds agreed to pay for all deposits lost after the first 50 up to 250. This turned out to be a shrewd deal as 319 of the 475 candidates the Liberal Party put up at the 1950 general election lost their deposits, amounting to two thirds of the total number of candidates standing.

== See also ==
- United Kingdom national and local elections
- United Kingdom by-election records
