= Thomas Charles Thompson =

English politician

Thomas Charles Thompson (18 February 1821 – 26 September 1892) was an English Liberal politician who sat in the House of Commons briefly in 1874 and from 1880 to 1885.

Thompson was the son of Thomas Thompson of Bishopwearmouth and his wife Elizabeth Pemberton, daughter of Richard Pemberton of Sunderland. He was educated at Harrow School. He attended University College, Durham, where he received his B.A. in 1835, his M.A. in 1840, and became a fellow in 1844.

He was a student at the Middle Temple from 5 November 1840 and was called to the bar at the Inner Temple in 1844. He was a J.P. for Durham and was High Sheriff of Durham in 1869. In 1867, he bought Ashdown Park.

Thompson stood for parliament unsuccessfully at Sunderland in 1868 and at City of Durham in 1871. He was elected member of parliament for City of Durham in February 1874, but his election was declared void in May 1874. He was elected at the 1880 general election and held the seat until 1885.

Thompson died at the age of 71.

Thompson married Marianne Moore, daughter of Rev. Richard Moore, rector of Lund, Lancashire, on 3 August 1854.

Parliament of the United Kingdom
Preceded by John Lloyd Wharton; John Henderson	Member of Parliament for City of Durham; Feb 1874 – May 1874; With: John Henderson	Succeeded by Farrer Herschell; John Henderson
Preceded by Sir Arthur Middleton; Farrer Herschell	Member of Parliament for City of Durham; 1880 – 1885; With: Farrer Herschell	Succeeded by Thomas Milvain
