= Richard Herschell, 2nd Baron Herschell =

British Liberal politician

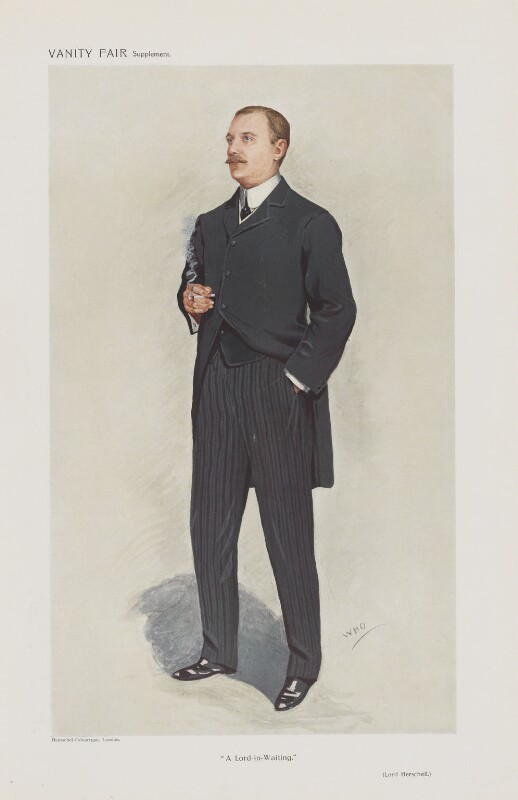
"A Lord-in-Waiting", caricature by WHO in Vanity Fair, 1910.

Richard Farrer Herschell, 2nd Baron Herschell GCVO (22 May 1878 – 14 October 1929), was a British Liberal politician.

== Background and early life ==
Herschell was the only son of the Lord Chancellor, Farrer Herschell, 1st Baron Herschell, and his wife Agnes Adela (née Kindersley), and succeeded in the barony in 1899. He was educated at Magdalen College, Oxford where he conducted the amateur undergraduate orchestra.

== Political career ==
He was private secretary to the Lord-Lieutenant of Ireland the Earl of Aberdeen from 1905 to 1907 and served in the Liberal administrations of Sir Henry Campbell-Bannerman and later H. H. Asquith as a Lord-in-waiting to King Edward VII, 1907-10 (government whip in the House of Lords) from 1907 to 1915. And also Lord-in-Waiting to George V 1910–19. He was awarded Order of the Dannebrog from Denmark, and Legion of Honour.

== Military career ==
In the First World War he served in the Royal Navy's code breaking section "Room 40" as a Commander RNVR.

== Family ==
Lord Herschell married Annie Vera Violet, daughter of Sir Arthur Thomas Bennett Nicolson, 10th Baronet, in 1919. The wedding took place at the Nicolson property of Brough Lodge on Fetlar, Shetland. He died in October 1929, aged 51, and was succeeded in the barony by his son Rognvald. Lady Herschell died in 1961.

== Honours ==
In 1907, Herschell was appointed to the Royal Victorian Order as a Member (MVO). In 1917, he was promoted within the same Order to be a Knight Commander (KCVO). In the 1919 New Year Honours, he was promoted again to be a Knight Grand Cross (GCVO).

== Arms ==
Coat of arms of Richard Herschell, 2nd Baron Herschell
Crest On a mount vert a stag proper, gorged with a collar gemel azure, and supporting with its dexter fore-foot a fasces in bend or. Escutcheon Per fesse azure and sable, in fesse a fasces proper between three stags’ heads couped or. Supporters On either side a stag proper, collared azure, standing or Motto Ceieriter (Quickly)

Peerage of the United Kingdom
Preceded by Farrer Herschell	Baron Herschell; 1899–1929	Succeeded by Rognvald Richard Farrer Herschell
