= 1874 City of Durham by-election =

UK Parliamentary by-election

The 1874 City of Durham by-election was fought on 13 June 1874. The by-election was fought due to the voiding of the incumbent Liberal MPs, Thomas Charles Thompson's and John Henderson elections. It was retained by the Liberal candidates Farrer Herschell. and Arthur Monck.

By-election, 13 Jun 1874: Durham (2 seats)
Party	Candidate	Votes	%	±%
Liberal	Farrer Herschell	930	27.8	−7.1
Liberal	Arthur Monck (Note: Monck changed his surname to Middleton in 1876)	918	27.5	−5.7
Conservative	Francis Duncan	752	22.5	+6.5
Conservative	Francis Lyon Barrington	742	22.2	+6.2
Majority		166	5.0	+3.7
Turnout		1,671 (est)	81.2 (est)	−3.7
Registered electors		2,059		
Liberal hold		Swing	-6.8	
Liberal hold		Swing	-6.0	
