= Sir John Fletcher, 1st Baronet =

British barrister and Conservative politician

Sir John Samuel Fletcher, 1st Baronet JP (3 November 1841 – 20 May 1924) was a British barrister and Conservative Party politician.

== Background ==
He was the second son of Samuel Fletcher, merchant of Manchester, and his wife Elizabeth Helen Kelsall, daughter of John Kelsall. Fletcher was educated at Harrow School and at Christ Church, Oxford, where he graduated with a Bachelor of Arts in 1864 and a Master of Arts in 1869, having been called to the Bar by Lincoln's Inn the year before.

== Career ==
Fletcher was appointed a member of the Hampstead Board of Guardians in 1876 and a chairman four years later, retiring from his post in 1898. He joined the London County Council in 1889, became a deputy chairman in March 1900 and left the council after another four years. Fletcher entered the House of Commons in 1905, sitting as a Member of Parliament (MP) for Hampstead until 1918. On 17 May 1919, he was created a baronet, of Ashe Ingen Court, in the Parish of Bridstow, in the County of Hereford. Fletcher served as a Justice of the Peace for Middlesex and London.

== Family ==
Fletcher married Sara Clark, second daughter of Jonathan Clark in 1895. They had no children and with his death the baronetcy became extinct.

Parliament of the United Kingdom
| Preceded by Thomas Milvain | Member of Parliament for Hampstead; 1905 – 1918 | Succeeded by George Balfour |
Baronetage of the United Kingdom
| New creation | Baronet (of Ashe Ingen Court); 1919–1924 | Extinct |
