= John Henderson (Durham MP) =

English businessman and Liberal politician

John Henderson (2 May 1807 – 4 April 1884) was an English businessman and Liberal politician who sat in the House of Commons from 1864 to 1874.

Henderson was the son of Gilbert Henderson of Durham, and his wife Ann Robinson. He was educated at the Grammar School, Durham. He was a carpet manufacturer and coal owner. He was a Deputy Lieutenant and J.P. for County Durham

Henderson was elected as a Member of Parliament (MP) for City of Durham at a by-election in 1864. He held the seat until 1874.

Henderson married Hannah Chipchase, daughter of Alderman Thomas Chipchase, of Durham in 1840.

Parliament of the United Kingdom
| Preceded by William Atherton; John Mowbray | Member of Parliament for City of Durham; 1864 – 1874; With: John Mowbray to 1868; John Robert Davison 1868–71; John Lloyd Wharton 1871 – Feb 1874; Thomas Charles Thompson from Feb 1874 | Succeeded by Sir Arthur Middleton, Bt; Farrer Herschell |
