= Hampstead (UK Parliament constituency) =

Former UK Parliament constituency, 1885–1983

- Former borough constituency for the House of Commons
- Boundary of Hampstead in Greater London for the 1974 general election
- County: County of London

1885–1983
- Seats: One
- Created from: Middlesex
- Replaced by: Hampstead and Highgate

Hampstead was a borough constituency, centered on the Hampstead area of North London. It returned one Member of Parliament (MP) to the House of Commons of the Parliament of the United Kingdom, who was elected using the first-past-the-post voting system.

It was created for the 1885 general election, and abolished for the 1983 general election, when it was partly replaced by the new Hampstead and Highgate constituency.

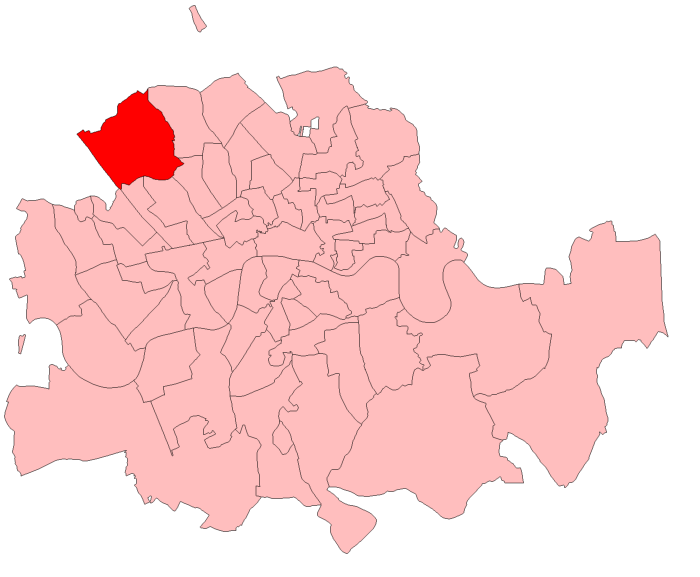
Hampstead in the Metropolitan area, boundaries used 1885–1918

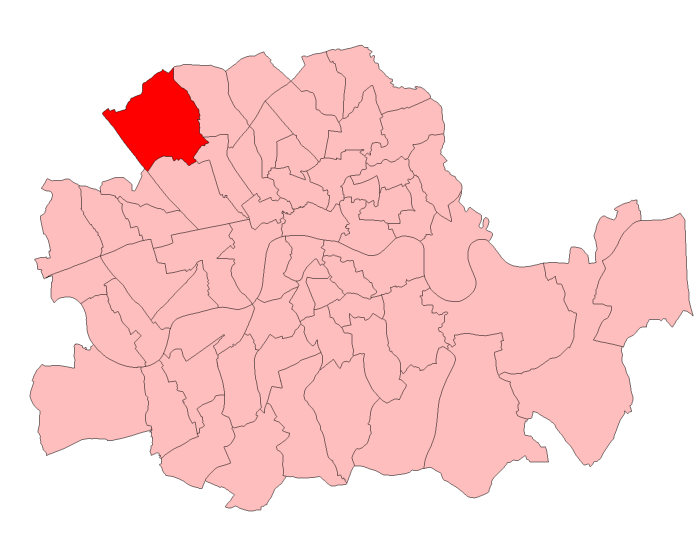
Hampstead in the Parliamentary County of London, boundaries used 1918–1950

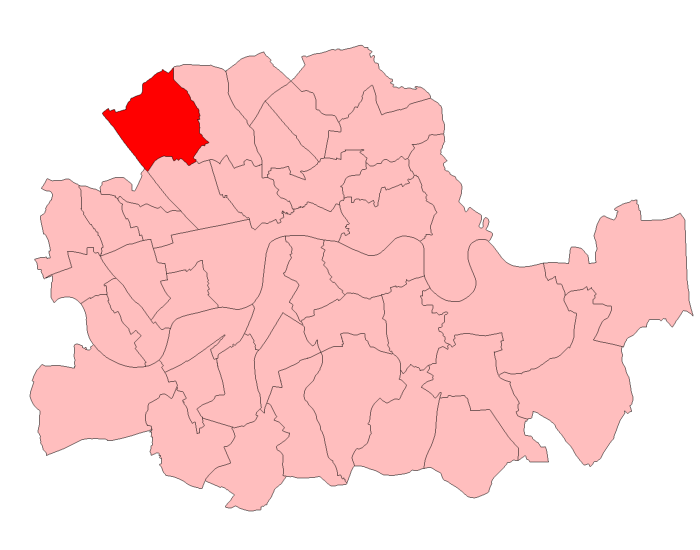
Hampstead in the Parliamentary County of London, boundaries used 1950–1974

A map showing the wards of Hampstead Metropolitan Borough as they appeared in 1916.

== Boundaries ==
Map of boundaries 1974–1983

1885–1918: The parish of St John, Hampstead.

1918–1974: The Metropolitan Borough of Hampstead

1974–1983: London Borough of Camden wards of Adelaide, Belsize, Hampstead Town, Kilburn, Priory, Swiss Cottage and West End.

The parliamentary borough of Hampstead was created by the Redistribution of Seats Act 1885, and consisted of the civil parish of St John, Hampstead, Middlesex. The parish had previously formed part of the Parliamentary County of Middlesex. Hampstead lay within the area of the Metropolitan Board of Works, and in 1889 this became the County of London. In 1900 the county was divided into twenty-eight metropolitan boroughs, with the civil parish becoming the Metropolitan Borough of Hampstead.

Parliamentary constituencies were redrawn under the Representation of the People Act 1918, with boundaries in London realigned to those of the metropolitan boroughs. Accordingly, the Hampstead constituency was defined by the legislation as being identical in area to the metropolitan borough of the same name. When the next redistribution was carried out under the Representation of the People Act 1948, the term "parliamentary borough" was replaced with "borough constituency". The renamed Hampstead Borough Constituency continued with the same boundaries, with the changes coming into effect for the 1950 general election.

In 1965 both the County of London and the metropolitan boroughs were abolished. Hampstead became part of the larger London Borough of Camden. The changes were not reflected in parliamentary boundaries until 1970. The constituency was officially renamed "Camden, Hampstead Borough Constituency" and was defined as comprising seven wards of the London Borough, namely Adelaide, Belsize, Hampstead Town, Kilburn, Priory, Swiss Cottage and West End. The wards of the borough were altered in 1973, with Swiss Cottage ward replacing Hampstead Central in the constituency's definition. These boundaries were used until 1983, when the seat was abolished.

== Members of Parliament ==
Election	Member	Party
1885	Sir Henry Holland	Conservative
1888 by-election	Edward Hoare	Conservative
1902 by-election	Thomas Milvain	Conservative
1905 by-election	John Fletcher	Conservative
1918	George Balfour	Coalition Conservative
1922	George Balfour	Conservative
1941 by-election	Charles Challen	Conservative
1950	Henry Brooke	Conservative
1966	Ben Whitaker	Labour
1970	Geoffrey Finsberg	Conservative
1983	constituency abolished: see Hampstead & Highgate	

== Election results ==
=== Elections in the 1880s ===
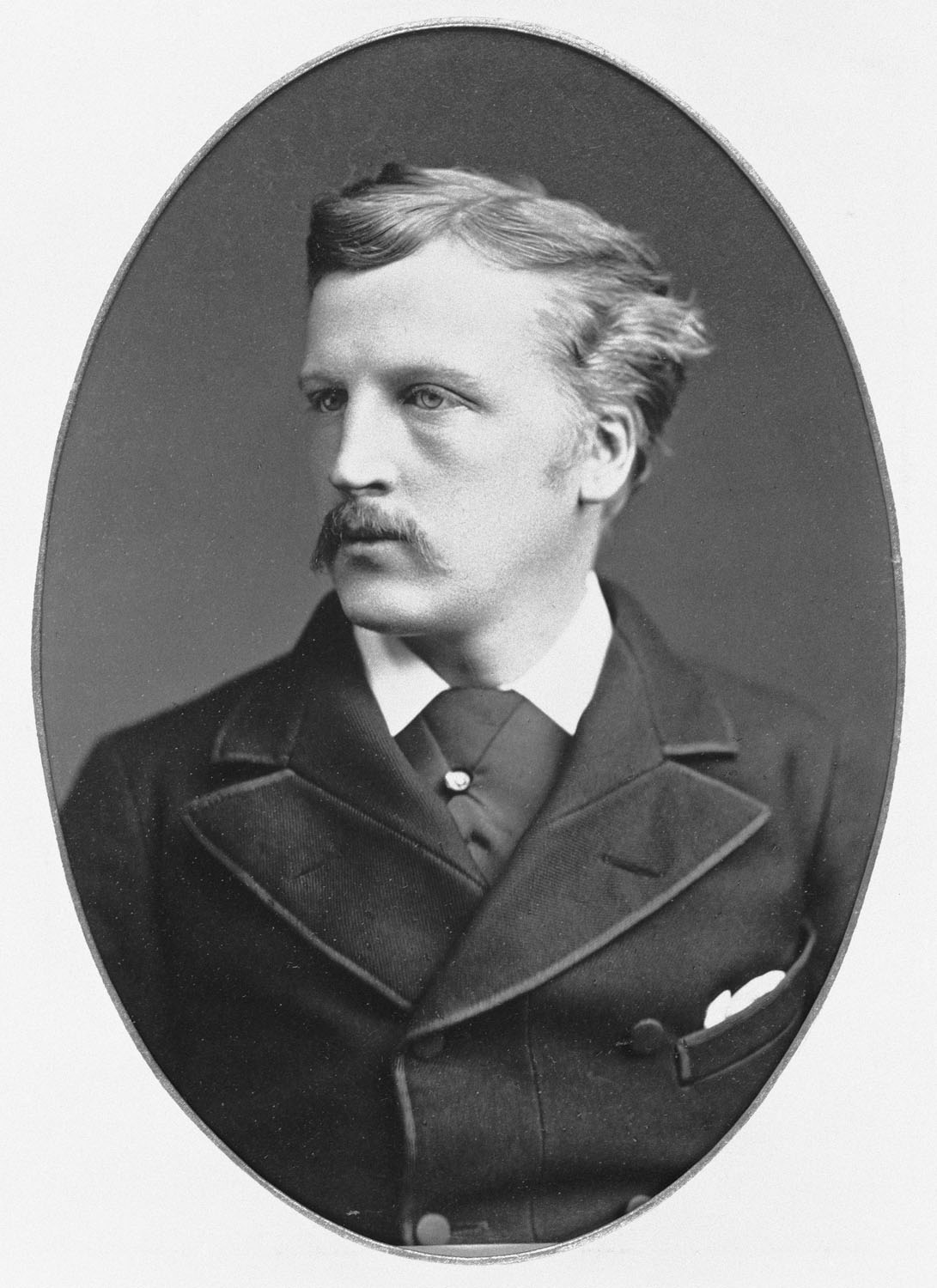
Marquess of Lorne

General election 1885: Hampstead
Party	Candidate	Votes	%
Conservative	Henry Holland	2,785	59.0
Liberal	John Campbell	1,910	40.4
Social Democratic Federation	Jack Williams	27	0.6
Majority		875	18.6
Turnout		4,722	79.0
Registered electors		5,981	
Conservative win (new seat)			

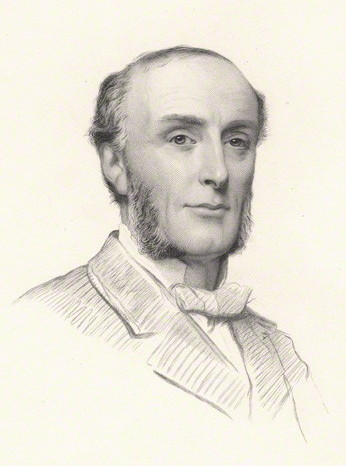
Sir Henry Holland

General election 1886: Hampstead
Party	Candidate	Votes	%	±%
Conservative	Henry Holland	2,707	74.1	+15.1
Liberal	William Ramsay Scott	945	25.9	−14.5
Majority		1,762	48.2	+29.6
Turnout		5,981	61.1	−17.9
Registered electors		5,981		
Conservative hold		Swing	+14.8	

Holland was appointed Vice-President of the Committee of the Council on Education, requiring a by-election.

1886 Hampstead by-election
Party	Candidate	Votes	%	±%
Conservative	Henry Holland	Unopposed		
Conservative hold				

Holland was elevated to the peerage, becoming Lord Knutsford, causing a by-election.

Edward Hoare

1888 Hampstead by-election
Party	Candidate	Votes	%	±%
Conservative	Edward Brodie Hoare	Unopposed		
Conservative hold				

=== Elections in the 1890s ===
General election 1892: Hampstead
Party	Candidate	Votes	%	±%
Conservative	Edward Brodie Hoare	3,848	63.2	−10.9
Liberal	John Castleman Swinburne-Hanham	2,239	36.8	+10.9
Majority		1,609	26.4	−21.8
Turnout		6,087	73.6	+12.5
Registered electors		8,272		
Conservative hold		Swing	−10.9	

General election 1895: Hampstead
Party	Candidate	Votes	%	±%
Conservative	Edward Brodie Hoare	Unopposed		
Conservative hold				

=== Elections in the 1900s ===
General election 1900: Hampstead
Party	Candidate	Votes	%	±%
Conservative	Edward Brodie Hoare	Unopposed		
Conservative hold				

1902 Hampstead by-election
Party	Candidate	Votes	%	±%
Conservative	Thomas Milvain	3,843	64.5	N/A
Liberal	George Frederic Rowe	2,118	35.5	New
Majority		1,725	29.0	N/A
Turnout		5,961	58.0	N/A
Registered electors		10,280		
Conservative hold		Swing	N/A	

1905 Hampstead by-election
Party	Candidate	Votes	%	±%
Conservative	John Fletcher	4,228	52.6	N/A
Liberal	George Frederic Rowe	3,803	47.4	N/A
Majority		425	5.2	N/A
Turnout		8,028	71.1	N/A
Registered electors		11,301		
Conservative hold		Swing	N/A	

General election 1906: Hampstead
Party	Candidate	Votes	%	±%
Conservative	John Fletcher	4,934	52.5	N/A
Liberal	George Frederic Rowe	4,461	47.5	N/A
Majority		473	5.0	N/A
Turnout		9,395	81.9	N/A
Registered electors		11,467		
Conservative hold		Swing	N/A	

=== Election in the 1910s ===
General election January 1910: Hampstead
Party	Candidate	Votes	%	±%
Conservative	John Fletcher	6,228	61.2	+8.7
Liberal	Frank Howard	3,949	38.8	−8.7
Majority		2,279	22.4	+17.4
Turnout		10,177	84.5	+2.6
Conservative hold		Swing	+8.7	

Samuel Dore

General election December 1910: Hampstead
Party	Candidate	Votes	%	±%
Conservative	John Fletcher	5,605	64.2	+3.0
Liberal	Samuel Lammas Dore	3,129	35.8	−3.0
Majority		2,476	28.4	+6.0
Turnout		8,734	72.5	−12.0
Conservative hold		Swing	+3.0	

General election 1918: Hampstead
Party		Candidate	Votes	%
C	Unionist Party (UK)	George Balfour	13,393	70.8
	Labour	Skene Mackay	3,646	19.3
	National	John Wrentmore	1,881	9.9
Majority			9,747	51.5
Turnout			18,920	58.1
Registered electors			32,544	
	Unionist win (new boundaries)			
C indicates candidate endorsed by the coalition government.

=== Elections in the 1920s ===
General election 1922: Hampstead
Party	Candidate	Votes	%	±%
Unionist	George Balfour	14,596	59.7	−11.1
National Liberal	Albert Clavering	5,582	22.8	New
Liberal	Lancelot Fletcher	4,282	17.5	New
Majority		9,014	36.8	−14.7
Turnout		24,460	63.1	+4.9
Registered electors		38,781		
Unionist hold		Swing	N/A	

General election 1923: Hampstead
Party	Candidate	Votes	%	±%
Unionist	George Balfour	13,513	58.6	−1.1
Liberal	Lancelot Fletcher	9,538	41.4	+23.9
Majority		3,975	17.2	−19.6
Turnout		23,051	58.0	−5.0
Registered electors		39,711		
Unionist hold		Swing	−12.5	

General election 1924: Hampstead
Party	Candidate	Votes	%	±%
Unionist	George Balfour	21,432	79.1	+20.5
Labour	Charles Hendin	5,662	20.9	New
Majority		15,770	58.2	+41.0
Turnout		27,094	67.2	+9.2
Registered electors		40,309		
Unionist hold		Swing	−0.2	

General election 1929: Hampstead
Party	Candidate	Votes	%	±%
Unionist	George Balfour	23,370	58.3	−20.8
Labour	F. E. Dawkins	8,473	21.1	+0.2
Liberal	M. Leon Freedman	8,273	20.6	New
Majority		14,897	37.1	−21.1
Turnout		40,116	62.8	−4.4
Registered electors		63,861		
Unionist hold		Swing	−10.5	

=== Elections in the 1930s ===
General election 1931: Hampstead
Party	Candidate	Votes	%	±%
Conservative	George Balfour	36,928	87.1	+28.8
Labour	Harry Smith	5,475	12.9	−8.2
Majority		31,453	74.2	+37.1
Turnout		42,403	65.7	+2.9
Registered electors		64,527		
Conservative hold		Swing	+18.5	

General election 1935: Hampstead
Party	Candidate	Votes	%	±%
Conservative	George Balfour	28,334	73.2	−13.9
Labour	Harry Smith	6,987	18.0	+5.1
Liberal	John Young	3,396	8.8	New
Majority		21,347	55.2	−19.0
Turnout		38,717	59.0	−6.7
Registered electors		65,575		
Conservative hold		Swing	−9.5	

=== Elections in the 1940s ===
1941 Hampstead by-election
Party	Candidate	Votes	%	±%
Conservative	Charles Challen	7,630	67.4	−5.8
National	Noel Pemberton Billing	2,734	24.1	New
Independent Progressive	Reg Hipwell	636	5.6	New
Independent	Arthur Dolland	326	2.9	New
Majority		4,896	43.3	−11.9
Turnout		11,326	17.3	−41.7
Registered electors		65,511		
Conservative hold		Swing		

General election 1945: Hampstead
Party	Candidate	Votes	%	±%
Conservative	Charles Challen	19,652	51.8	−21.4
Labour	William Field	18,294	48.2	+30.2
Majority		1,358	3.6	−51.6
Turnout		37,946	68.4	+9.4
Registered electors		55,446		
Conservative hold		Swing	−25.8	

=== Elections in the 1950s ===
General election 1950: Hampstead
Party	Candidate	Votes	%	±%
Conservative	Henry Brooke	29,949	52.3	+0.5
Labour	William Hawkins	17,373	30.3	−17.9
Liberal	Wilfred Watson	8,336	14.6	New
Communist	R Gore	1,603	2.8	New
Majority		12,576	22.0	+16.4
Turnout		57,261	80.5	+12.1
Registered electors		71,119		
Conservative hold		Swing	+9.2	

General election 1951: Hampstead
Party	Candidate	Votes	%	±%
Conservative	Henry Brooke	31,346	55.1	+2.8
Labour	Arthur Richardson	19,240	33.8	+3.5
Liberal	Wilfred Watson	6,320	11.1	−3.5
Majority		12,106	21.3	−0.7
Turnout		56,906	78.0	−2.5
Registered electors		72,946		
Conservative hold		Swing	−0.3	

General election 1955: Hampstead
Party	Candidate	Votes	%	±%
Conservative	Henry Brooke	28,226	55.9	+0.8
Labour	Arthur Richardson	16,040	31.8	−2.0
Liberal	Harry Seigal	6,222	12.3	+1.2
Majority		12,186	24.1	+2.9
Turnout		50,488	69.7	−8.3
Registered electors		72,423		
Conservative hold		Swing	+1.4	

General election 1959: Hampstead
Party	Candidate	Votes	%	±%
Conservative	Henry Brooke	25,506	53.4	−2.5
Labour	David Pitt	13,500	28.3	−3.5
Liberal	Harry Seigal	8,759	18.3	+6.0
Majority		12,006	25.1	+1.0
Turnout		47,765	68.8	−0.9
Registered electors		69,438		
Conservative hold		Swing	+0.5	

=== Elections in the 1960s ===
General election 1964: Hampstead
Party	Candidate	Votes	%	±%
Conservative	Henry Brooke	19,888	43.3	−10.1
Labour	John Cooper	18,053	39.3	+11.0
Liberal	Renee Soskin	8,019	17.4	−0.9
Majority		1,835	4.0	−21.1
Turnout		45,960	67.6	−1.2
Registered electors		67,990		
Conservative hold		Swing	−10.6	

General election 1966: Hampstead
Party	Candidate	Votes	%	±%
Labour	Benjamin Whitaker	22,963	46.8	+7.5
Conservative	Henry Brooke	20,710	42.2	−1.1
Liberal	Renee Soskin	5,182	10.6	−6.9
Socialist (GB)	Harry Baldwin	211	0.4	New
Majority		2,253	4.6	N/A
Turnout		49,066	72.4	+4.8
Registered electors		67,798		
Labour gain from Conservative		Swing	+4.3	

=== Elections in the 1970s ===
General election 1970: Hampstead
Party	Candidate	Votes	%	±%
Conservative	Geoffrey Finsberg	21,264	46.6	+4.4
Labour	Benjamin Whitaker	20,790	45.6	−1.2
Liberal	John Calmann	3,550	7.8	−2.8
Majority		474	1.0	N/A
Turnout		45,604	63.4	−9.0
Registered electors		71,918		
Conservative gain from Labour		Swing	+2.8	

General election February 1974: Hampstead
Party	Candidate	Votes	%	±%
Conservative	Geoffrey Finsberg	19,536	43.3	−3.3
Labour	Tony Clarke	17,279	38.3	−7.3
Liberal	Ronald Longland	8,323	18.4	+10.7
Majority		2,257	5.0	+4.0
Turnout		45,138	70.7	+7.3
Registered electors		63,847		
Conservative hold		Swing	+2.0	

General election October 1974: Hampstead
Party	Candidate	Votes	%	±%
Conservative	Geoffrey Finsberg	18,139	44.9	+1.6
Labour	Tony Clarke	16,414	40.6	+2.3
Liberal	Ronald Longland	5,566	13.8	−4.7
Irish Civil Rights	Maureen Maguire	146	0.4	New
Socialist (GB)	Ralph Critchfield	118	0.3	New
Independent	Chandra Rao	31	0.1	New
Majority		1,725	4.3	−0.7
Turnout		40,414	63.1	−7.6
Registered electors		64,078		
Conservative hold		Swing	−0.4	

General election 1979: Hampstead
Party	Candidate	Votes	%	±%
Conservative	Geoffrey Finsberg	20,410	47.3	+2.4
Labour	Ken Livingstone	16,729	38.8	−1.8
Liberal	David Radford	5,753	13.3	−0.4
National Front	Jean White	255	0.6	New
Majority		3,681	8.5	+4.2
Turnout		43,147	67.4	+4.3
Registered electors		64,004		
Conservative hold		Swing	+2.1	
