= 1949 Kesteven County Council election =

1949 UK local government election

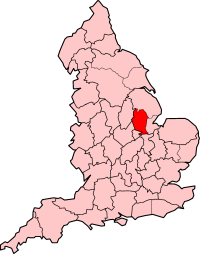
The administrative county of Kesteven (1889–1974), shown within England.

Elections to Kesteven County Council were held on Saturday, 9 April 1949. Kesteven was one of three divisions of the historic county of Lincolnshire in England; it consisted of the ancient wapentakes (or hundreds) of Aswardhurn, Aveland, Beltisloe, Boothby Graffoe, Flaxwell, Langoe, Loveden, Ness, and Winnibriggs and Threo. The Local Government Act 1888 established Kesteven as an administrative county, governed by a Council; elections were held every three years from 1889, until it was abolished by the Local Government Act 1972, which established Lincolnshire County Council in its place.

For the 1949 election, the county was divided into sixty wards, ten of which accounted for the town of Grantham, five for Stamford, three for Sleaford and two for Bourne. Every seat in Grantham was contested, but all of the nominated candidates for the towns of Bourne, Sleaford and Stamford were returned unopposed. The majority of the councillors returned were independents.

== Results ==
=== Ancaster ===
Ancaster
Party	Candidate	Votes	%	±%
	Robert G. Simpson	NA	NA	

=== Bassingham ===
Bassingham
Party	Candidate	Votes	%	±%
	W. H. G. Battersby	597		
Labour	J. Collins	159		

=== Bennington ===
Bennington
Party	Candidate	Votes	%	±%
	Frederick Winter	NA	NA	

=== Billingborough ===
Billingborough
Party	Candidate	Votes	%	±%
	Arthur Wilson	NA	NA	

=== Billinghay ===
Billinghay
Party	Candidate	Votes	%	±%
	Edgar Gilbert	NA	NA	

=== Bourne no. 1 ===
Bourne no. 1
Party	Candidate	Votes	%	±%
	Rev. W. J. Rees			

=== Bourne no. 2 ===
Bourne no. 2
Party	Candidate	Votes	%	±%
	Robert A. Collins			

=== Bracebridge ===
Bracebridge
Party	Candidate	Votes	%	±%
	?	?	?	
Turnout				

=== Branston ===
Branston
Party	Candidate	Votes	%	±%
	W. E. Young			
	J. R. Wilkinson			

=== Bytham ===
Brytham
Party	Candidate	Votes	%	±%
	John H. Turner	NA	NA	

=== Caythorpe ===
Caythorpe
Party	Candidate	Votes	%	±%
	John W. Oxby	NA	NA	

=== Claypole ===
Claypole
Party	Candidate	Votes	%	±%
	John W. Milner	452		
	A. Musson	133		

=== Colsterworth ===
Colsterworth
Party	Candidate	Votes	%	±%
	James Duke Hind	NA	NA	

=== Corby ===
Corby
Party	Candidate	Votes	%	±%
	Kenneth King			

=== Cranwell ===
Cranwell
Party	Candidate	Votes	%	±%
	John Edwin Mountain	492		
	Samuel Edward Bainbridge Pattinson	151		

=== Deeping St James ===
Deeping St James
Party	Candidate	Votes	%	±%
	?	?	?	

=== Dunston ===
Dunston
Party	Candidate	Votes	%	±%
	John Ireson	NA	NA	

=== Gonerby and Barrowby ===
Gonerby and Barrowby
Party	Candidate	Votes	%	±%
Independent	Harry Kelham Scrimshaw	336		
Labour	John Edward Snell	232		

=== Grantham no. 1 ===
Grantham no. 1
Party	Candidate	Votes	%	±%
Labour	Montague Ogden	347		
Independent	Arthur Syddall	309		
Turnout				

=== Grantham no. 2 ===
Grantham no. 2
Party	Candidate	Votes	%	±%
Labour	Mrs. E. F. Bullimore	525		
Independent	James E. Young	335		

=== Grantham no. 3 ===
Grantham no. 3
Party	Candidate	Votes	%	±%
Labour	John W. Harrison	472		
Conservative	John C. Barry Thompson	395		
Turnout				

=== Grantham no. 4 ===
Grantham no. 4
Party	Candidate	Votes	%	±%
Independent	William Griffin	533		
Labour	John Leslie Foweather	519		
Turnout				

=== Grantham no. 5 ===
Grantham no. 5
Party	Candidate	Votes	%	±%
Independent	Mrs Jessie E. W. Browse	602		
Labour	Wilfred A. Ogden	398		
Turnout				

=== Grantham no. 6 ===
Grantham no. 6
Party	Candidate	Votes	%	±%
Independent	Frederick L. Preston	329		
Labour	Charles F. Robinson	288		
Turnout				

=== Grantham no. 7 ===
Grantham no. 7
Party	Candidate	Votes	%	±%
Independent	Albert E. E. Cooper	426		
Labour	Frederick G. Atwood	272		
Turnout				

=== Grantham no. 8 ===
Grantham no. 8
Party	Candidate	Votes	%	±%
Conservative	Mrs Dorothy Shipman	400		
Labour	Daniel Hadley Horrigan	173		
Turnout				

=== Grantham no. 9 ===
Grantham no. 9
Party	Candidate	Votes	%	±%
Independent	Mrs Veronica M. F. Webster	799		
Labour	Reginald Charles Moore	715		
Turnout				

=== Grantham no. 10 ===
Grantham no. 10
Party	Candidate	Votes	%	±%
Conservative	Mrs Louise Marion Ward	445		
Labour	George Ernest Waltham	264		
Turnout				

=== Heckington ===
Heckington
Party	Candidate	Votes	%	±%
	John Henry Brighton			
	George Henry Dunmore			

=== Helpringham ===
Helpringham
Party	Candidate	Votes	%	±%
	?	?	?	

=== Kyme ===
Kyme
Party	Candidate	Votes	%	±%
	Carl John Willows	NA	NA	

=== Leadenham ===
Leadenham
Party	Candidate	Votes	%	±%
	Captain Henry William Newman Fane	NA	NA	

=== Market Deeping ===
Market Deeping
Party	Candidate	Votes	%	±%
	?	?	?	

=== Martin ===
Martin
Party	Candidate	Votes	%	±%
	?	?	?	

=== Metheringham ===
Metheringham
Party	Candidate	Votes	%	±%
	Frank Cooling Townsend	NA	NA	

=== Morton ===
Morton
Party	Candidate	Votes	%	±%
	Rev. C. Letts			

=== Navenby ===
Navenby
Party	Candidate	Votes	%	±%
	Rev. Donald Edward Griffin	NA	NA	

=== North Hykeham ===
North Hykeham
Party	Candidate	Votes	%	±%
	?	?	?	

=== Osbournby ===
Osbournby
Party	Candidate	Votes	%	±%
	H. H. Morris	NA	NA	

=== Ponton ===
Ponton
Party	Candidate	Votes	%	±%
	Capt. Sir Hugh Cholmeley Bt	NA	NA	

N.B. Nomination papers were also received for John A. Widdowson, but were deemed invalid.

=== Rippingale ===
Rippingale
Party	Candidate	Votes	%	±%
	John Harold Emerson	240		
	Archibald W. Sharman	192		
	Arthur Hoyes	165		

=== Ropsley ===
Ropsley
Party	Candidate	Votes	%	±%
	James F. Dodds	NA	NA	

=== Ruskington ===
Ruskington
Party	Candidate	Votes	%	±%
	Arthur James Hossack	753		
	Benjamin Ebenezer Brighton	343		

=== Scopwick ===
Scopwick
Party	Candidate	Votes	%	±%
	Kenneth Charles Irving	NA	NA	

=== Skellingthorpe ===
Skellingthorpe
Party	Candidate	Votes	%	±%
	Richard Clement Turner	NA	NA	

=== Sleaford no. 1 ===
Sleaford no. 1
Party	Candidate	Votes	%	±%
	Edgar Wilfred Elmore	NA	NA	

=== Sleaford no. 2 ===
Sleaford no. 2
Party	Candidate	Votes	%	±%
	Herbert Hutchinson Brown	NA	NA	

=== Sleaford no. 3 ===
Sleaford no. 3
Party	Candidate	Votes	%	±%
	William Middleton	NA	NA	

=== Stamford no. 1 ===
Stamford no. 1
Party	Candidate	Votes	%	±%
	Ernest Ireson	NA	NA	

=== Stamford no. 2 ===
Stamford no. 2
Party	Candidate	Votes	%	±%
	Harry Skells	NA	NA	

=== Stamford no. 3 ===
Stamford no. 3
Party	Candidate	Votes	%	±%
	Canon John Duncan Day	NA	NA	

=== Stamford no. 4 ===
Stamford no. 4
Party	Candidate	Votes	%	±%
	Percy Keech Banks	NA	NA	

=== Stamford no. 5 ===
Stamford no. 5
Party	Candidate	Votes	%	±%
	Albert Edward Millett			

=== Swinderby ===
Swinderby
Party	Candidate	Votes	%	±%
	Percy William Spray			

=== Thurlby ===
Thurlby
Party	Candidate	Votes	%	±%
	Thomas G. Holmes	NA	NA	

=== Uffington ===
Uffington
Party	Candidate	Votes	%	±%
	?	?	?	

=== Washingborough ===
Washingborough
Party	Candidate	Votes	%	±%
	George Henry Applewhite	NA	NA	

=== Welby ===
Welby
Party	Candidate	Votes	%	±%
	Brigadier-General R. L. Adlercron	NA	NA	

=== Wilsford ===
Wilsford
Party	Candidate	Votes	%	±%
	Lieutenant-Commander John Cracroft-Amcotts	NA	NA	

=== Woolsthorpe ===
Woolsthorpe
Party	Candidate	Votes	%	±%
	FitzHerbert Wright			
