= 1949 Cardiganshire County Council election =

1949 Welsh local election

The eighteenth election to Cardiganshire County Council took place in April 1949. It was preceded by the 1946 election and followed by the 1952 election.

== Candidates ==
35 candidates were returned unopposed resulting in fifteen contests which was eight less than in 1946 but consistent with most of the inter-war period.

Eight aldermen retired, of whom four sought election.

== Outcome ==
There was very little change as the new council was composed entirely of Independents, apart from the sole Labour councillor who was re-elected unopposed at Aberystwyth. Four other Labour candidates were defeated.

== Results ==
=== Aberaeron ===
Aberaeron 1949
Party	Candidate	Votes	%	±%
Independent	Evan John Thomas	398		
Independent	T.G. Griffiths-Herbert	289		
Independent	Phyllis Warden Sewell	148		
Majority		109		
Independent hold		Swing		

=== Aberbanc ===
Aberbanc 1949
Party	Candidate	Votes	%	±%
Independent	Benjamin John Davies*	Unopposed		
Independent gain from Independent		Swing		

=== Aberporth ===
Aberporth 1949
Party	Candidate	Votes	%	±%
Independent	Rev Evan Melinfab Lewis*	Unopposed		
Independent hold		Swing		

=== Aberystwyth Division 1 ===
Aberystwyth Division 1 1949
Party	Candidate	Votes	%	±%
Labour	John John	Unopposed		
Labour hold		Swing		

=== Aberystwyth Division 2 ===
Aberystwyth Division 2 1949
Party	Candidate	Votes	%	±%
Independent	Gwendoline Calan Evans*	Unopposed		
Independent hold		Swing		

=== Aberystwyth Division 3 ===
Aberystwyth Division 3 1949
Party	Candidate	Votes	%	±%
Independent	Enoch James Morgan*	386		
Labour	James Ian Parkes Boultbee	138		
Majority		276		
Independent hold		Swing		

=== Aberystwyth Division 4 ===
Aberystwyth Division 4 1949
Party	Candidate	Votes	%	±%
Independent	Richard Ellis*	529		
Labour	Richard H. Rochell	248		
Majority		281		
Independent hold		Swing		

=== Aberystwyth Division 5 ===
Aberystwyth Division 5 1949
Party	Candidate	Votes	%	±%
Independent	Emlyn Abraham-Williams*	Unopposed		
Independent hold		Swing		

=== Aberystwyth Division 6 ===
Aberystwyth Division 6 1949
Party	Candidate	Votes	%	±%
Independent	Gwendolen Eluned Jones	Unopposed		
Independent hold		Swing		

=== Aeron ===
Aeron 1949
Party	Candidate	Votes	%	±%
Independent	E. Glyn Davies*	Unopposed		
Independent hold		Swing		

=== Borth ===
Borth 1949
Party	Candidate	Votes	%	±%
Independent	Rev J. Bowden Thomas*	510		
Independent	Jesse Matthews	309		
Majority		201		
Independent hold		Swing		

=== Bow Street ===
Bow Street 1949
Party	Candidate	Votes	%	±%
Independent	Bodin Trevor Williams*	Unopposed		
Independent hold		Swing		

=== Cardigan North ===
Cardigan North 1949
Party	Candidate	Votes	%	±%
Independent	Hubert Maxwell Davies+	Unopposed		
Independent hold		Swing		

=== Cardigan South ===
Cardigan South 1949
Party	Candidate	Votes	%	±%
Independent	R.L. Phillips*	420		
Independent	John Evan Jones	200		
Majority		220		
Independent hold		Swing		

=== Cilcennin ===
Cilcennin 1949
Party	Candidate	Votes	%	±%
Independent	Evan Evans*	Unopposed		
Independent hold		Swing		

=== Cwmrheidol ===
Cwmrheidol 1949
Party	Candidate	Votes	%	±%
Independent	Isaac Richard Howells+	184		
Independent	Gwynn Mason Lewis	143		
Majority		41		
Independent hold		Swing		

=== Devil's Bridge ===
Devil's Bridge 1949
Party	Candidate	Votes	%	±%
Independent	Rev David Lewis Evans*	Unopposed		
Independent hold		Swing		

=== Felinfach ===
Felinfach 1949
Party	Candidate	Votes	%	±%
Independent	Simon Davies*	409		
Independent	Hext Lewes	304		
Majority		105		
Independent hold		Swing		

=== Goginan ===
Goginan 1949
Party	Candidate	Votes	%	±%
Independent	Isaac Richard Lewis*	Unopposed		
Independent hold		Swing		

=== Lampeter Borough ===
Lampeter Borough 1949
Party	Candidate	Votes	%	±%
Independent	William Lewis*	Unopposed		
Independent hold		Swing		

=== Llanarth ===
Llanarth 1949
Party	Candidate	Votes	%	±%
Independent	David Christmas Evans	317		
Independent	Jenkin Garfield Thomas	202		
Labour	Ada Jessie Emrys-Jones	154		
Independent	David Jones	144		
Majority		115		
Independent hold		Swing		

=== Llanbadarn Fawr ===
Llanbadarn Fawr 1949
Party	Candidate	Votes	%	±%
Independent	Emile Thomas Evans*	Unopposed		
Independent hold		Swing		

=== Llanddewi Brefi ===
Llanddewi Brefi 1949
Party	Candidate	Votes	%	±%
Independent	William Morgan Davies*	Unopposed		
Independent hold		Swing		

=== Llandygwydd ===
Llandygwydd 1949
Party	Candidate	Votes	%	±%
Independent	Edward Lloyd Davies*	Unopposed		
Independent hold		Swing		

=== Llandysul North ===
Llandysul North 1949
Party	Candidate	Votes	%	±%
Independent	Griffith Davies*	Unopposed		
Independent hold		Swing		

=== Llandysul South ===
Llandysul South 1949
Party	Candidate	Votes	%	±%
Independent	Edward Lewis*	Unopposed		
Independent hold		Swing		

=== Llansysiliogogo ===
Llandysiliogogo 1949
Party	Candidate	Votes	%	±%
Independent	Ben Thomas*	Unopposed		
Independent hold		Swing		

=== Llanfair Clydogau ===
Llanfair Clydogau 1949
Party	Candidate	Votes	%	±%
Independent	D.O. Morgan	Unopposed		
Independent hold		Swing		

=== Llanfarian ===
Llanfarian 1949
Party	Candidate	Votes	%	±%
Independent	William Zadrach Jones*	Unopposed		
Independent hold		Swing		

=== Llanfihangel y Creuddyn ===
Llanfihangel y Creuddyn 1949
Party	Candidate	Votes	%	±%
Independent	John Daniel Evans+	Unopposed		
Independent hold		Swing		

=== Llangoedmor ===
Llangoedmor 1949
Party	Candidate	Votes	%	±%
Independent	Evan Davies*	Unopposed		
Independent hold		Swing		

=== Llangeitho ===
Llangeitho 1949
Party	Candidate	Votes	%	±%
Independent	Daniel Lodwick Herbert+	Unopposed		
Independent hold		Swing		

=== Llangrannog ===
Llangrannog 1949
Party	Candidate	Votes	%	±%
Independent	Evan Richard Jones*	Unopposed		
Independent hold		Swing		

=== Llanilar ===
Llanilar 1949
Party	Candidate	Votes	%	±%
Independent	David Price Thomas	Unopposed		
Independent hold		Swing		

=== Llanrhystyd ===
Llanrhystyd 1949
Party	Candidate	Votes	%	±%
Independent	D. Alban Davies*	Unopposed		
Independent hold		Swing		

=== Llanllwchaiarn ===
Llanllwchaiarn 1949
Party	Candidate	Votes	%	±%
Independent	David Owen Williams*	Unopposed		
Independent hold		Swing		

=== Llansantffraed ===
Llansantffraed 1949
Party	Candidate	Votes	%	±%
Independent	John Dewi Morgan*	Unopposed		
Independent hold		Swing		

=== Llanwnen ===
Llanwnen 1949
Party	Candidate	Votes	%	±%
Independent	William Grey Hughes*	318		
Independent	John Evans	164		
Majority		154		
Independent hold		Swing		

=== Llanwenog ===
Llanwenog 1949
Party	Candidate	Votes	%	±%
Independent	Meredith Ll. Gwarnant Williams+	Unopposed		
Independent hold		Swing		

=== Lledrod ===
Lledrod 1949
Party	Candidate	Votes	%	±%
Independent	Owen James Owen*	Unopposed		
Independent hold		Swing		

=== Nantcwnlle ===
Nantcwnlle 1949
Party	Candidate	Votes	%	±%
Independent	John Edwardes Rogers Lewis*	Unopposed		
Independent hold		Swing		

=== New Quay ===
New Quay 1949
Party	Candidate	Votes	%	±%
Independent	David Oswald Davies	487		
Independent	John Sidney Davies	235		
Majority		252		
Independent hold		Swing		

=== Penbryn ===
Penbryn 1949
Party	Candidate	Votes	%	±%
Independent	David Lloyd Thomas*	316		
Independent	Morgan Lloyd Jenkins	255		
Majority		61		
Independent hold		Swing		

=== Strata Florida ===
Strata Florida 1949
Party	Candidate	Votes	%	±%
Independent	Emrys S. Lloyd*	287		
Independent	Joseph Morgan Hughes	275		
Majority		12		
Independent hold		Swing		

=== Taliesin ===
Taliesin 1949
Party	Candidate	Votes	%	±%
Independent	Gwilym Caradog Jones	261		
Independent	John Oliver	114		
Independent	John Morgan Davies	106		
Majority		155		
Independent hold		Swing		

=== Talybont ===
Talybont 1949
Party	Candidate	Votes	%	±%
Independent	Isaac Richard Jenkins	261		
Independent	David Lewis Edwards*	227		
Majority		34		
Independent gain from Independent		Swing		

=== Trefeurig ===
Trefeurig 1949
Party	Candidate	Votes	%	±%
Independent	Richard Rowland Davies*	Unopposed		
Independent hold		Swing		

=== Tregaron ===
Tregaron 1949
Party	Candidate	Votes	%	±%
Independent	Rev David Thomas Jones	Unopposed		
Independent hold		Swing		

=== Troedyraur ===
Troedyraur 1946
Party	Candidate	Votes	%	±%
Independent	Edwin Stanley Jones	431		
Labour	Thomas Lewis Morris	305		
Majority		126		
Independent hold		Swing		

=== Ysbyty Ystwyth ===
Ysbyty Ystwyth 1949
Party	Candidate	Votes	%	±%
Independent	Evan Richard Edwards*	Unopposed		
Independent hold		Swing		

== Election of Aldermen ==
In addition to the 50 councillors the council consisted of 16 county aldermen. Aldermen were elected by the council, and served a six-year term. Following the 1949 election, there were eight aldermanic vacancies which were filled at the annual meeting. The following retiring aldermen were re-elected:

- J.D. Evans, New Cross
- D.L. Herbert, Llangeitho
- Meredydd Ll.G. Williams, Llanwenog

In addition, the following four new aldermen were elected:

- Emlyn Abraham-Williams, Aberystwyth
- D. Alban Davies, Llanrhystud
- Simon Davies, Felinfach
- D. Lloyd Thomas, Tresaith
- Evan Davies, Llechryd

In addition to the three retiring aldermen who were re-elected, Simon Davies had previously served as an alderman from 1928 until 1946.

== By-elections ==
Seven by-elections were held following the election of aldermen.

=== Aberystwyth Division 5 by-election ===
Aberystwyth Division 5 by-election 1949
Party	Candidate	Votes	%	±%
Independent	R.J. Ellis	313		
Independent	Mrs C.A. Middleton	246		
Independent	T.I. Ellis	115		
Majority		67		
Independent hold		Swing		

=== Felinfach by-election ===
Felinfach by-election 1949
Party	Candidate	Votes	%	±%
Independent	Thomas Davies	541		
Independent	John Hext Lewes	301		
Majority		240		
Independent hold		Swing		

=== Llanfihangel y Creuddyn by-election ===
Llanfihangel y Creuddyn by-election 1949
Party	Candidate	Votes	%	±%
Independent	David H. Jones	321		
Independent	James Thomas	239		
Majority		82		
Independent hold		Swing		

=== Llangeitho by-election ===
Llangeitho by-election 1949
Party	Candidate	Votes	%	±%
Independent	David Lloyd	474		
Independent	George Harris	149		
Majority		325		
Independent hold		Swing		

=== Llangoedmor by-election ===
Llangoedmor by-election 1949
Party	Candidate	Votes	%	±%
Independent	Edward Howard Lloyd	426		
Independent	David Thomas James	182		
Majority		244		
Independent hold		Swing		

=== Llanrhystud by-election ===
Llanrhystud by-election 1949
Party	Candidate	Votes	%	±%
Independent	Jenkin Griffiths	284		
Independent	David Charles Morgan	280		
Majority		4		
Independent hold		Swing		

=== Llanwenog by-election ===
Llanwenog by-election 1949
Party	Candidate	Votes	%	±%
Independent	Donald Gwarnant Williams	Unopposed		
Independent hold		Swing		

=== Penbryn by-election ===
Penbryn by-election 1949
Party	Candidate	Votes	%	±%
Independent	Morgan Lloyd Jenkins	373		
Independent	David James Davies	225		
Majority		148		
Independent hold		Swing		
