= Charles Challen =

British barrister and politician

Member of Parliament for Hampstead
- In office 27 November 1941 – 3 February 1950
- Preceded by: George Balfour
- Succeeded by: Henry Brooke

Personal details
- Born: 15 February 1894
- Died: 20 June 1960 (aged 66)
- Party: Conservative
- Education: Jesus College, Cambridge (MA, LLB)
- Occupation: Barrister
- Military career
- Allegiance: United Kingdom
- Branch: British Army
- Service years: 1914 – 1919
- Rank: Lieutenant
- Unit: Royal Field Artillery
- Battles of World War I: France; Egypt

Charles Challen (15 February 1894 – 20 June 1960) was a British barrister and politician.

== Biography ==
Challen was educated at Merchant Taylors' School and received a Bachelor of Laws and Master's degree from Jesus College, Cambridge (later becoming a member of the Oxford and Cambridge Club). During the First World War, he served in France and Egypt as a Lieutenant in the Royal Field Artillery. He was a barrister-at-law at Gray's Inn and won the Arden Prize in 1922. He never married.

Challen was Conservative Member of Parliament (MP) for Hampstead from a by-election in 1941 to 1950, when his local Conservative association declined to readopt him for that year's general election. This had followed a rumour that Challen was intending to defect to the Labour Party, which he rebutted in a letter to The Times. Challen had intended to stand again as an Independent Conservative against the new Conservative candidate, Henry Brooke, but was persuaded to withdraw in the interests of the party.

He died on 20 June 1960, aged 66.

=== The 1945 'anti-alien' petition ===
In October 1945, an antisemitic petition was drawn up, with the help of Waldron Smithers's (Conservative MP for Orpington) Fighting Fund for Freedom, by residents of Hampstead, requesting "that aliens of Hampstead should be repatriated to assure men and women of the Forces should have accommodation upon their return" from World War II. The petition was signed by the antisemitic Conservative mayor of Hampstead, Sydney A. Boyd, and four of Hampstead's Conservative councillors, with the rest of the Conservative members of the council in favour of the petition. Challen, as the constituency's MP, promised to give the petition his "unstinting support", and he asked a number of questions in the House of Commons on behalf of the petitioners over the following months. When the petition was complete, Conservative Councillor J. A. Hughes passed it to Challen who, "rather than repudiate the sponsors for their antisemitism", delivered it to Parliament.

Parliament of the United Kingdom
Preceded by George Balfour	Member of Parliament for Hampstead; 27 November 1941 – 23 February 1950	Succeeded by Henry Brooke
