= Trevor v Whitworth =

- Court: House of Lords
- Citations: Trevor v Whitworth [1887] UKLawRpAC 26, (1887) 12 App Cas 409

Keywords
- Company law; Share buy backs

Trevor v Whitworth (1887) 12 App Cas 409 is a UK company law case concerning share buybacks. It held they were unlawful. The case is often used in support of the Capital Maintenance Rule. The rule coming from the case itself has since been reformed by statute in several commonwealth countries. In the UK, the rule was reformed in 1980 and replaced with a statutory procedure so that shares can either be classed as redeemable or be bought back, under the Companies Act 2006 sections 684-723. In Australia, share buybacks are allowed under ss 257A-257J of the Corporations Act 2001.

== Facts ==
A company bought back almost a quarter of its shares. During the liquidation of the company, one shareholder applied to the court for the balance of the amounts owed to him after the buyback.

The Court of Appeal held that he should be paid.

== Judgment ==
The House of Lords held the buyback was ultra vires the company. Lord Herschell said the following,

If the claim under consideration can be supported, the result would seem to be this, that the whole of the shareholders, with the exception of those holding seven individual shares, might now be claiming payment of the sums paid upon their shares as against the creditors, who had a right to look to the moneys subscribed as the source out of which the company’s liabilities to them were to be met. And the stringent precautions to prevent the reduction of the capital of a limited company, without due notice and judicial sanction, would be idle if the company might purchase its own shares wholesale, and so effect the desired result... I cannot think that the employment of the company’s money in the purchase of shares for any such purpose was legitimate.

Lord Macnaghten also gave an opinion.

== See also ==
- UK company law
