= 1949 Virginia lieutenant gubernatorial election =

- November 8, 1949
Nominee	Lewis Preston Collins II	E. Thomas McGuire
Party	Democratic	Republican
Popular vote	180,479	66,037
Percentage	73.21%	26.79%
- County and independent city results Collins: 50–60% 60–70% 70–80% 80–90% >90% McGuire: 50–60%
Lieutenant Governor before election
Lewis Preston Collins II
Democratic
Elected Lieutenant Governor
Lewis Preston Collins II
Democratic

The 1949 Virginia lieutenant gubernatorial election was held on November 8, 1949, in order to elect the lieutenant governor of Virginia. Democratic nominee and incumbent lieutenant governor Lewis Preston Collins II defeated Republican nominee E. Thomas McGuire.

== General election ==
On election day, November 8, 1949, Democratic nominee Lewis Preston Collins II won re-election by a margin of 114,442 votes against his opponent Republican nominee E. Thomas McGuire, thereby retaining Democratic control over the office of lieutenant governor. Collins was sworn in for his second term on January 20, 1950.

=== Results ===
Virginia lieutenant gubernatorial election, 1949
Party	Candidate	Votes	%
Democratic	Lewis Preston Collins II (incumbent)	180,479	73.21
Republican	E. Thomas McGuire	66,037	26.79
Total votes		246,516	100.00
Democratic hold			
