= Hampstead Board of Guardians =

The Hampstead Board of Guardians (Hampstead, England) was created in 1800. but from 1837 until 1848 it was absorbed into the Edmonton Union.

The Hampstead Board of Guardians regained its independent status in 1848.
