= Sir Ralph Cole, 2nd Baronet =

English politician (1629–1704)

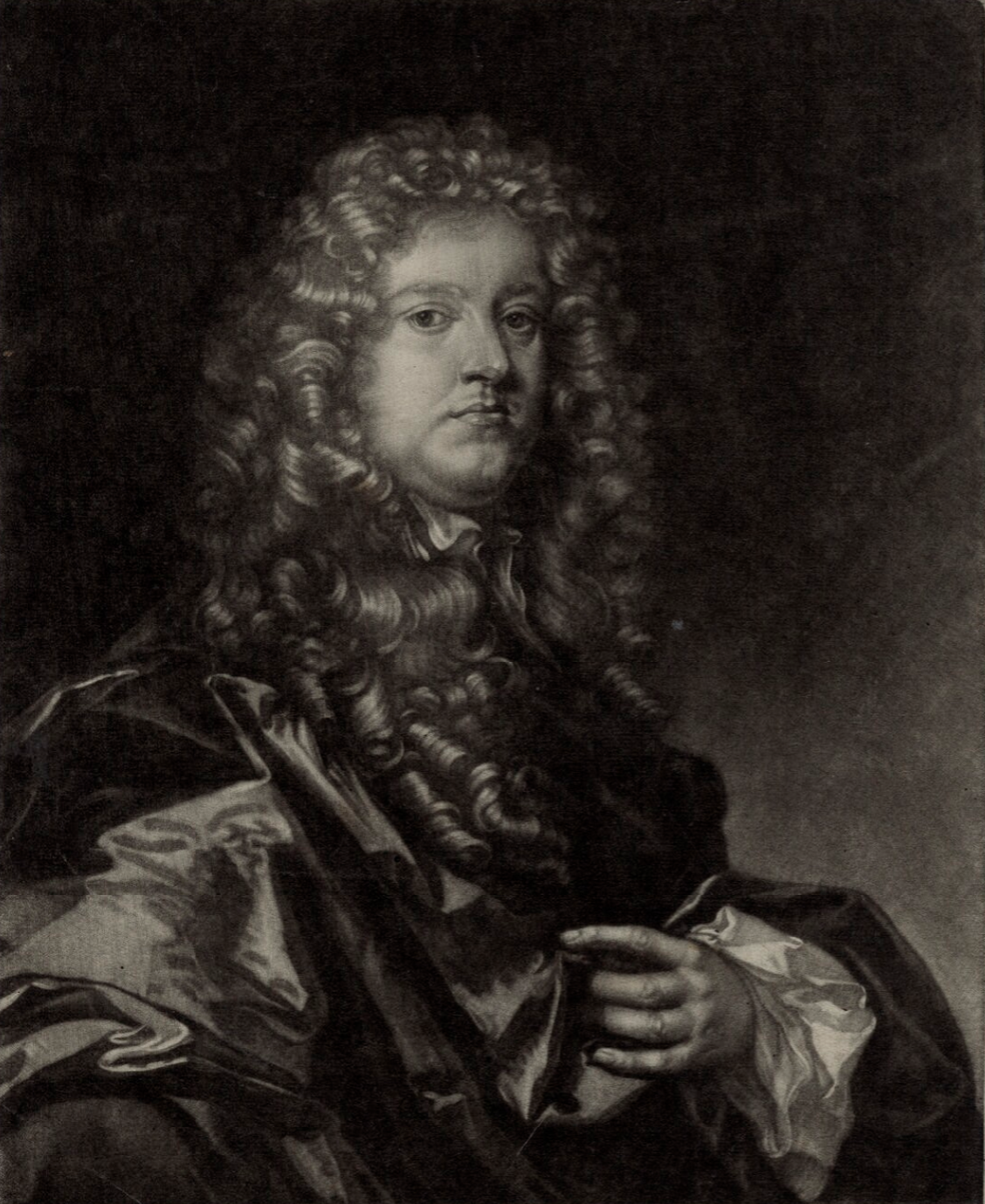
Sir Ralph Cole, c.1700

Sir Ralph Cole, 2nd Baronet (1629 – 1704) was an English politician.

== Life ==
Cole was the son of Sir Nicholas Cole, 1st Baronet and his first wife Mary Liddell, daughter of Sir Thomas Liddell, 1st Baronet. His father was mayor of Newcastle upon Tyne and a wealthy merchant who owned Brancepeth Castle.

In 1660 Cole succeeded to his father's baronetcy. He was the Member of Parliament for the City of Durham between 1678 and 1679.

== Family ==
Cole married:

1. Firstly, by 1651, Margaret Windham (died 1657), daughter of Thomas Windham of Felbrigg, a widow;
2. Secondly, Catherine Foulis (died 1704), daughter of Sir Henry Foulis, 2nd Baronet.

He had three sons. He was succeeded by his grandson Sir Nicholas Cole, 3rd Baronet.

Parliament of England
New constituency	Member of Parliament for City of Durham; 1678–1679; With: John Parkhurst (1678); William Tempest (1679)	Succeeded by William Blakiston; Sir Richard Lloyd
Baronetage of England
Preceded by Nicholas Cole	Baronet (of Brancepeth); 1660–1704	Succeeded by Nicholas Cole
