= Charles Montagu (died 1721) =

English coal owner and Member of Parliament

The Honourable Charles Montagu (c.1658 – 1721) was an English coal owner and Member of Parliament.

Charles Montagu was born around 1658, the fifth son of Edward Montagu, 1st Earl of Sandwich and Jemima Crew. He was educated at St Neots Grammar School and then Trinity College, Cambridge, where he became a Fellow and received an MA in 1682, joining Lincoln College, Oxford the same year. He was admitted to the Middle Temple on 6 February 1676.

In 1684, Montagu was appointed constable of Durham Castle and spiritual chancellor of the diocese by his uncle, Bishop Nathaniel Crew. He represented the city of Durham in James II's parliament, but probably took no active part in it and accepted the outcome of the Glorious Revolution. The Earl of Carlisle and Sir William Blackett considered him to be "the very man" to represent Northumberland in the election of 1695, but he was returned for a second spell at Durham instead, sitting as a Whig until 1702.

Bishop Crew's leases of mining rights to Montagu and his brother Sidney Wortley Montagu established the family as one of the most powerful coal owners in the North East, by the end of the century Montagu's pits were producing more than 100,000 tons of coal each year. Such was his wealth that he appeared on a list of subscribers to the Bank of England in 1694 shown having sufficient stock to qualify for election as a director. His coal interests were later passed to his eldest son, James.

== Family ==
Montagu married twice, firstly to Elizabeth Forster, daughter and heiress of Francis Forster of Belford, with whom he had a son:

- James Montagu, MP for Chippenham from 1708 to 1710 and for Camelford from 1715 to 1722.

His second wife was Sarah Rogers (died 1721), with whom he had four more children:

- Edward Montagu, MP for Huntingdon from 1734 to 1768, married pioneering bluestocking Elizabeth Robinson.
- Crewe Montagu
- John Montagu, Lieutenant colonel of foot, briefly MP for Stockbridge before his death in 1734.
- Jemima Montagu, married Sir Sidney Meadows.

Charles Montagu died in Breda, and was buried the family vault at All Saints' church in Barnwell, Northamptonshire on 29 June 1721.

Parliament of England
| Preceded by William Tempest; Sir Richard Lloyd | Member of Parliament for Durham City; 1685–1689; With: Sir Richard Lloyd | Succeeded by George Morland; Henry Liddell |
| Preceded by George Morland; William Tempest | Member of Parliament for Durham City; 1695–1702; With: Henry Liddell 1695–1698; Thomas Conyers 1698–1701; Sir Henry Belasyse 1701–1702 | Succeeded by Thomas Conyers; Sir Henry Belasyse |
Honorary titles
| Preceded by Nicholas Conyers | High Sheriff of Durham; 1690-1705 | Succeeded by Mark Shafto |
