= William David Evans =

English lawyer

Sir William David Evans (1767 –1821) was an English lawyer.

Evans, son of John Evans and Janet Butterfield, was born in London 25 May 1767, and educated at Harrow School. On attaining his sixteenth year he was articled to a Warrington solicitor, in whose office he relieved the tedium of business hours by courting the muses. He was admitted an attorney in February 1789, and began to practise at Leigh, Lancashire. Soon afterwards he entered his name as a student of Gray's Inn, and in February 1794 was called to the bar, when he joined the northern circuit, took up his residence in Liverpool, and practised there for several years as a special pleader and conveyancer. On the first appointment of a stipendiary magistrate for Manchester, in 1813, Evans was offered and accepted the office. Two years later he was appointed vice-chancellor of the County Palatine of Lancaster. He held these offices concurrently until 1818, and discharged their duties with dignity and impartiality.

== Later career ==
In 1817 he was unsuccessful in an application for a vacant judgeship, but two years later the recordership of Bombay in India, worth 7,000l. a year, was conferred on him, and at the same time he received the honour of knighthood. On the voyage out, Evans occupied himself on the composition of A Treatise upon the Civil Law, and he originated a weekly literary publication for the amusement of his fellow-voyagers. He began his duties in India with great promise of success, but in little more than fifteen months after his arrival he fell a victim to a complaint of some standing, no doubt aggravated by the climate, dying on 5 Dec. 1821, in his fifty-fifth year.

He was married in 1790 to Hannah, daughter of Peter Seaman of Warrington. She survived him until 1832. There is an engraved portrait of Evans by Edward Scriven, executed shortly before his going out to Bombay.

== Bibliography ==
- Salkeld's Reports, 1795, 3 vols. 8vo.
- Essays on the Action for Money lent and received, &c., 1802, 8vo.
- A General View of the Decisions of Lord Mansfield in Civil Causes, 1803, 2 vols. 4to.
- A Treatise on the Law of Obligations and Contracts, from the French of Pothier, 1806, 2 vols. 8vo.
- Letter to Sir S. Romilly on the Revision of the Bankrupt Laws, 1810
- Letters on the Disabilities of the Roman Catholics and Dissenters, 1813
- The Practice of the Court of Common Pleas of Lancaster, 1814.
- A Charge to the Grand Jury at Preston, 1817.
- An Address on the Discharging the Prisoners apprehended on account of an illegal Assembly at Manchester, 1817.
- A Collection of Statutes relating to the Clergy, with Notes, 1817.
- A Collection of the Statutes connected with the general Administration of the Law, arranged according to the Order of Subjects, with Notes, Manchester, 1817, 8 vols. 8vo;
  - continued in another edition to 1835 by Anthony Hammond and Thomas Colpitts Granger

Sir Charles Harcourt Chambers's Treatise on the Law of Landlord and Tenant was compiled from his notes, and he left in manuscript a Life of the Chancellor d'Aguesseau, which Charles Butler made use of in his work on the same subject.
