= Admiralty Advocate =

British legal officer in the High Court of Admiralty (1661–1867)

Office of the Admiralty Advocate
- Ensign of the Royal Navy
- Department of the Admiralty
- Reports to: First Lord of the Admiralty
- Nominator: First Lord of the Admiralty
- Appointer: Prime Minister; Subject to formal approval by the Queen-in-Council
- Term length: Not fixed
- Inaugural holder: William Turner
- Formation: 1661-1867

The Admiralty Advocate was one of the Law Officers of the Crown. He represented the Crown in the High Court of Admiralty from 1661 to 1867. He was also known as the Advocate for the Affairs of the Admiralty.

== History ==
The post was first established in 1661 with the post holder representing the Crown in the High Court of Admiralty. After 1875, when the Admiralty Court became part of the Probate, Divorce and Admiralty Division of the new High Court of Justice, the office became obsolete.

== Admiralty Advocates after 1660 ==
Source unless otherwise specified:

- 1660: T. Hyde
- 29 October 1661: William Turner
- c.1670: Sir Walter Walker
- 19 May 1674: Richard Lloyd
- 13 September 1685: Thomas Pinfold
- 17 July 1686: William Oldiss
- 17 September 1693: Fisher Littleton
- 26 January 1694: Henry Newton (temporarily during the illness of Littleton)
- 16 March 1697: Henry Newton (permanently)
- 15 November 1704: Nathaniel Lloyd (deputy during the absence of Newton)
- 28 October 1714: Henry Penrice
- 15 August 1715: Richard Fuller
- 30 March 1727: Exton Sayer
- 1 October 1731: Edmund Ishan
- 20 March 1741: William Strahan (1742 according to Walker)
- 9 August 1748: Thomas Salusbury
- 14 November 1751: Charles Pinfold, junior
- 15 February 1756: John Bettesworth
- 14 June 1764: George Harris
- 1 May 1782: William Scott
- 4 September 1788: Thomas Bever
- 12 November 1791: William Battine
- 1 March 1801: Sir Christopher Robinson (omitted in Walker)
- 25 November 1811: James Henry Arnold (omitted in Walker)
- 11 March 1829: John Dodson
- 25 October 1834: Joseph Phillimore
- 1855: Robert Joseph Phillimore
- 1862: Travers Twiss
- 1867: James Parker Deane (1868 according to Walker)

== Sources ==
- Office, Admiralty (March 1828). "Judicial Department". The Navy List. London, England: John Murray.
- Haydn, Joseph; Ockerby, Horace (1969). The Book of Dignities (1894) (Reprint ed.). London, England: W. H. Allen & Co.
