= January 1871 Durham City by-election =

UK parliamentary by-election

The 1871 Durham City by-election was held on 14 January 1871. It was uncontested and retained by incumbent Liberal Party MP John Robert Davison. However, Davison died in April, and a second by-election was held later in the month.

== Background ==
The by-election was held due to Davison becoming Judge Advocate General. When an MP was appointed to certain ministerial posts then they were obliged to stand again for Parliament under the Succession to the Crown Act 1707 in what became known as a ministerial by-election.

== Campaign ==
Although Davison began a campaign for the election, he stopped after realising that there would be no opposition. However, a week before the nomination, Davison was lobbied by a nonconformist group over the recent Education Act. Davison told the group that he was unable to make a substantial comment on the issue and that he felt he should support the government's position.

== Nomination ==
The nomination took place at 11am on 14 January in Durham Town Hall. Davison was nominated by George Robson and seconded by HJ Marshall. The mayor asked whether there were any other candidates. After receiving no answer, he asked for a show of hands and declared Davison elected. Davison then thanked the attendees, which included fellow Liberal MPs Hedworth Williamson and Joseph Dodds, who represented the nearby North Durham and Stockton-on-Tees constituencies. He made a short speech in which he claimed that Prime Minister Gladstone still had the confidence of the public. and that the government had kept every promise it had made. Following his speech, the town clerk read the formal declaration of election.
