= Francis Gregg =

English lawyer and politician

Francis Gregg (1734–1795) was an English lawyer and Member of Parliament.

== Family background ==
Coat of arms (1725) of Gregg of Derby

The Greggs were a family of legal professionals from Derbyshire, and the name "Francis Gregg" was found in successive generations. As explained by Daniel Lysons, the Gregg became armigerous in the early 18th century. Their background was in Ilkeston. The motif of trefoils alludes to the arms of Gregg(e) of Bradley.

This Francis Gregg (Francis III) was an attorney and Member of Parliament, known also as Francis Gregg of Wallington. The arms were granted in 1725 to Foot Gregg of Derby; and descended to Francis III, his great-nephew; the grant was to "the descendants of his father Francis, of Ilkeston and Norton Lees Hall." Francis I (of Lees Hall, Derby and Putney) was one of the Six Clerks of Chancery (and married Mary Burton). Francis II, the father of Francis III the MP, is given by the History of Parliament as "Francis Gregg of Putney"; he married Emilia/Emilie of Putney.

The clerkship of the Worshipful Company of Skinners stayed in the extended Gregg family for over a century (see below).

== Life ==
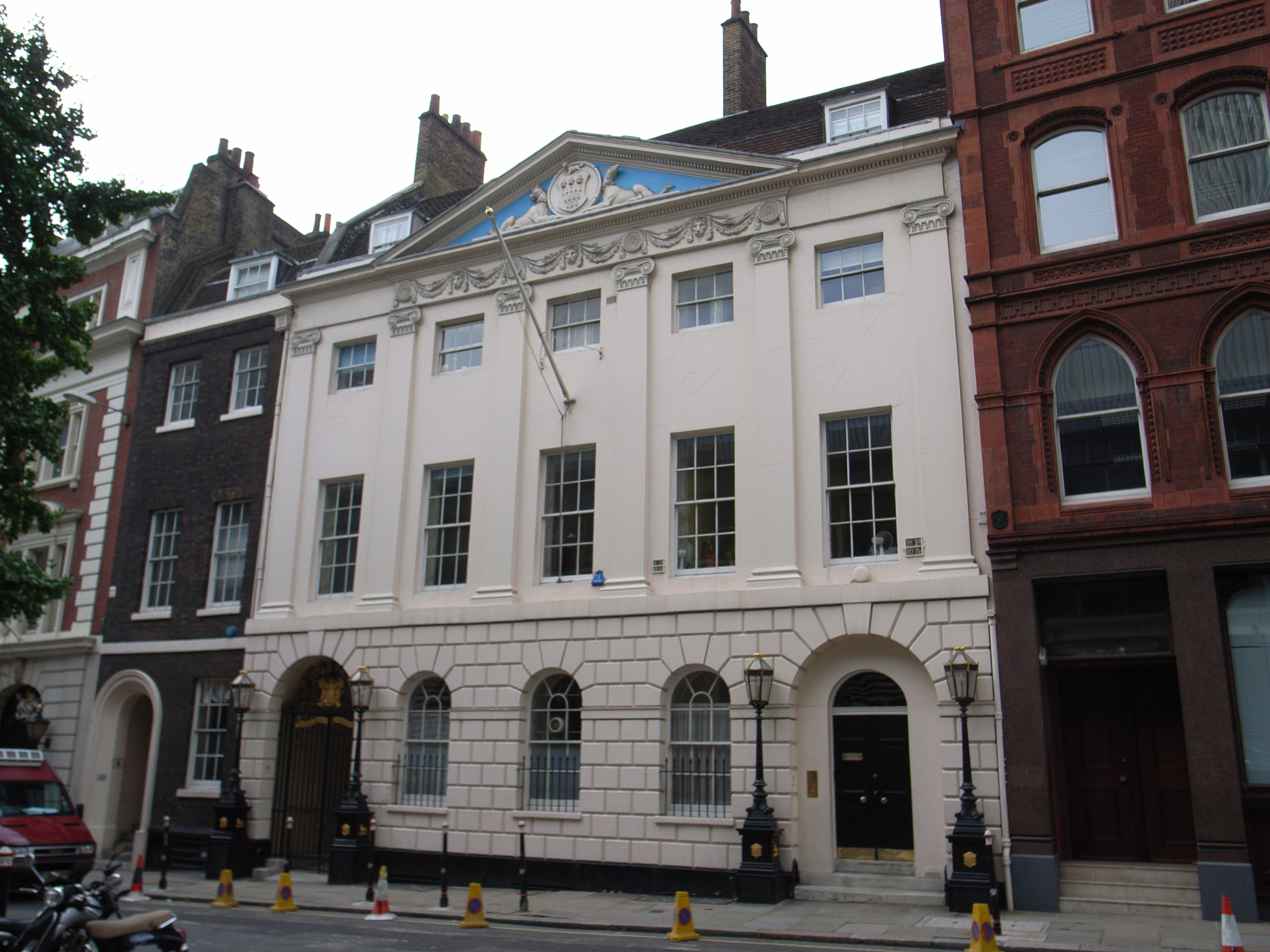
Skinners' Hall, the 18th century building in Dowgate ward where Francis Gregg was in business

Gregg was son of Francis Gregg of Putney, and was clerk to the Worshipful Company of Skinners from 1759. He became a lawyer in practice at Skinners's Hall, Dowgate Hill, London, in the substantial legal firm Gregg & Potts. They acted as the defence solicitors in the case around the arrest of George Pigot, 1st Baron Pigot. Potts died in 1788.

Gregg was legal adviser to Frederick Howard, 5th Earl of Carlisle, and was asked to stand for parliament for Morpeth, while the Earl's heir Lord Morpeth reached the age of 21. He was duly elected for Morpeth in 1789, and held the seat until 1794.

During the 1780s Gregg had a mansion built in Mitcham, Park House.

== Family ==
Gregg married Elizabeth Wellford on 6 October 1758, and they had a family of three sons and three daughters,. Their children included:

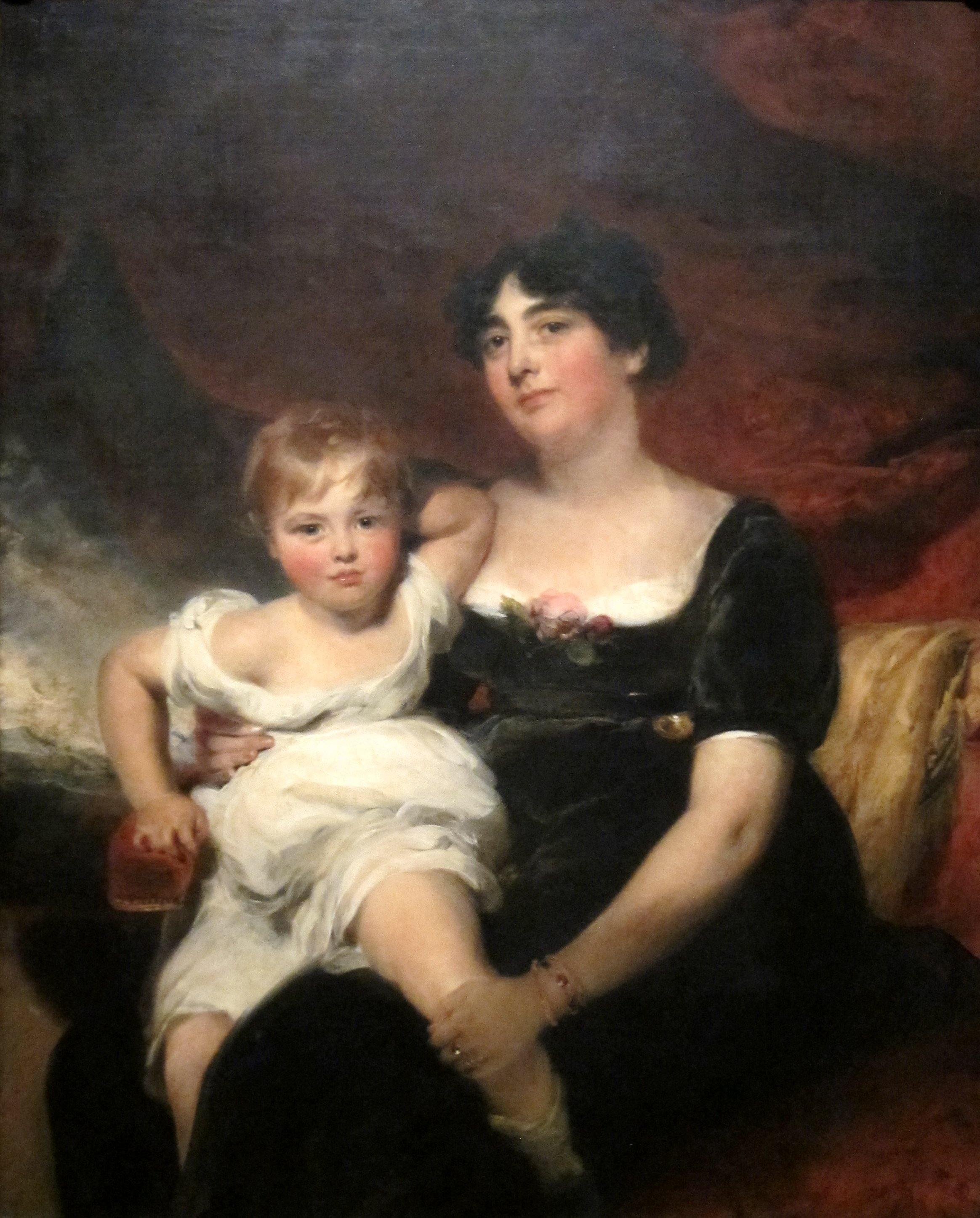
Janet Gregg, wife of Francis Gregg junior, with her son George

- Henry Gregg (c.1759–1826), the eldest son, a barrister: see below.
- Francis junior (died 1825), who married Janet Bell (died 1841) of Mincing Lane in 1791. He succeeded his father as clerk to the Skinners' Company (this is substantiated by the company history by Herbert). From 1825 the clerk was George Gregg, son of Francis junior, who died in 1828; then from 1828 Thomas Glover Kensit, as given in the company history by Wadmore. Kensit married Janet, the youngest daughter of Francis junior, in 1828.
- William Frederick, youngest son, died 1823.
- Caroline (1770–1823), who married Ralph Carr (1768–1837) of Stannington, Northumberland, a barrister.
- Emily, who married in 1783 Richard Norman of Melton Mowbray, as his first wife.

== Henry Gregg ==
Henry Gregg (c.1759–1826, aged 66 at death) was a barrister of Lincoln's Inn, distinguished mainly as a London social figure. He was elected a Fellow of the Royal Society in 1798, but was never formally admitted.

=== Early life ===
Henry Gregg acted as an Under Sheriff for London and Middlesex, in 1777. That year, he matriculated at St John's College, Oxford. He graduated B.A., from Christ Church, Oxford, in 1781. That year, he is styled "Student" of Christ Church (equivalent to Fellow in other colleges) in a book subscription list.

=== Legal career ===
Travelling the northern circuit as a barrister, Gregg took James Boswell to visit Naworth Castle, on 24 July 1788, where he had "plenary power" as an agent through his father's position with the Howards. He corresponded with the poet William Parsons, who sent him a sonnet, published in 1807. He appeared in The Court and City Register for 1801 as a commissioner for bankrupts, residing at 43 Bedford Square. He acted as a stipendiary magistrate in Shadwell, appointed in 1814 and resigning in 1816.

=== Associations ===
In the 1790s Gregg was a social figure of literary London. He dined and drank in 1790–1 with James Boswell (who admired of one of his young daughters), in company with Thomas Bever and Caleb Whitefoord. Another poem written by Parsons commemorated a dinner invitation from Gregg, with Robert Nares and William Boscawen.

Gregg was a Fellow of the Society of Antiquaries of London. Elected to the Royal Society on 6 December 1798, his membership lapsed due to non-attendance.

=== Death ===
Gregg died in Bedford Square on 22 February 1826, at age 67.

=== Family of Henry Gregg ===
Gregg married Maria Gosling (c.1772–1847, aged 75 at death) in August 1794. They lived at 43 Bedford Square, London. (Henry Gregg is recorded as in occupation of 44 Bedford Square, in 1794.)

Their children included:

- Henry William Gregg, eldest son, married in 1848 Frances Winifred Rouse
- R. J. Gregg, second son, married in 1839 Catherine Julia Buller, daughter of Cornelius Buller.
- Charles Francis Gregg, Enniskellen Dragoons, youngest son, married in 1843 Isabella Susan Carr. NB Visitation of England and Wales states he is son of Henry Gregg who married Maria Gosling, and grandson of Francis Gregg of Wallington.
- Maria Elizabeth Gregg, eldest daughter, married in 1820 Richard Gosling.
- Harriet Catherine, second daughter, died at age 58 in 1855.
- Caroline Jessy (or Jessey) Gregg, third daughter, married in 1832 Francis Gosling.

After Gregg's death, Maria his widow lived, from 1827, at 5 Park Square, Regent's Park, London, and Belle Vue House, Richmond, Surrey. She was acquainted with Fanny D'Arblay and her sister Esther Burney.
