= Anthony Hammond (legal writer) =

English barrister and legal writer

Anthony Hammond (1758–1838) was an English barrister and legal writer, known as a legal reformer. His reform proposals for legal codification, influenced by Jeremy Bentham but also by Robert Malthus, went further than was acceptable at the time.

== Life ==
He practised below the bar as a special pleader at the Inner Temple and on the Western Circuit.

In 1824 Hammond was examined by a select parliamentary committee appointed to consider the expediency of consolidating and amending the criminal law of England; and he submitted a draft measure for that purpose, which was printed by order of the House of Commons. It was later developed into a regular code, and formed the basis of Peel's Acts (the Larceny Laws Repeal and Consolidation, Criminal Procedure and Malicious Injuries to Property, and Remedies against the Hundred Consolidation Acts of 1827 (7 & 8 Geo 4 cc 27 - 31), according to Rigg. Radzinowicz disputes this. The code itself, with A Treatise on the Consolidation of the Criminal Law, was printed by order of Robert Peel, then Home Secretary, between 1825 and 1829, 8 vols, folio.

Hammond was also consulted by the commissioners for the revision of the laws of the State of New York in 1825, to whom he communicated a pamphlet entitled Reflections on the Criminal Law. In 1828, Hammond was called to the bar. He died on 27 January 1838.

== Works ==
Hammond published the following works:

- The Law of Nisi Prius. 1816. 8vo.
- Parties to Actions. 1817, 1827. 8vo.
- Principles of Pleading. 1819. 8vo.
- Scheme of a Digest of the Laws of England, with Introductory Essays on the Science of Natural Jurisprudence. 1820. 8vo.
- Reports in Equity. 1821. 2 vols. 8vo.
- Analytical Digest to the Term Reports and others. 1824, second edition. 8vo. New edition, 1827.
- A Summary Treatise of the Practice and Proceedings in Parliament. 1825. 8vo.
- On the Reduction to Writing of the Criminal Law of England. 1829. 8vo.

He also edited the fifth edition of Comyns' Digest and re-edited, along with Thomas Colpitts Granger, William David Evans' A Collection of Statutes...:

- Vol 1, 1836
- Vol 2, 1836
- Vol 3, 1836
- Vol 4, 1836
- Vol 5, 1836
- Vol 6, 1836
- Vol 7, 1836
- Vol 8, 1836
- Vol 9
- Vol 10, 1836
- Supplement, 1836(?)

== Notes ==
Attribution

This article incorporates text from a publication now in the public domain: Rigg, James McMullen (1890). "Hammond, Anthony (1758-1838)". In Stephen, Leslie; Lee, Sidney (eds.). Dictionary of National Biography. Vol. 24. London: Smith, Elder & Co. p. 240.
