= Cole baronets =

Extinct baronetcy in the Baronetage of England

Escutcheon of the Cole baronets of Brancepeth

There have been two baronetcies created for people named Cole, one in the Baronetage of England and one in the Baronetage of Ireland.

The Cole Baronetcy, of Brancepeth Castle, in the County of Durham was created on 4 March 1640 in the Baronetage of England for Nicholas Cole, Mayor of Newcastle upon Tyne 1640 and 1641. He was an ardent Royalist who played a key part in the defence of Newcastle, which withstood a seven-month siege by Parliamentary forces in 1644. The Baronetcy became extinct on the death of the 4th Baronet, Sir Mark Cole of Brancepeth, in 1727.

The Cole Baronetcy, of Newland, in the County of Dublin was created on 23 January 1661 for John Cole. His son Arthur was elevated to Baron Ranelagh in 1715.

== Cole of Brancepeth (1640) ==
- Sir Nicholas Cole, 1st Baronet (died 1660)
- Sir Ralph Cole, 2nd Baronet (1629–1704) Member of Parliament for Durham 1678/9
- Sir Nicholas Cole, 3rd Baronet (1685–1711)
- Sir Mark Cole, 4th Baronet (1687–1720) Extinct on his death

== Cole of Newland (1661) ==
See Baron Ranelagh
