= William Harker =

William Harker (23 June 1819 – 18 September 1905) was a wool merchant, banker and Liberal politician who represented Ripon.

Harker was born at Pateley Bridge, near Harrogate, Yorkshire, the son of Robert and Nancy Harker. He made a fortune in the wool trade at Bradford and became a director of the Bradford Banking Company, which was later merged into Barclays Bank. In civic matters, he helped in the development of improved water supply and sewage disposal in Bradford. Harker was elected MP for Ripon in 1885 but lost the seat in 1886.

Harker died in 1905 and, in 1906, his daughter Gertrude had repaired the old Chapel of St Mary the Virgin, which had been deconsecrated and left as a ruin, and established the Harker Memorial in Pateley Bridge Cemetery. Other family members named on the monument include his son, Robert, who was killed in action in France in 1915, and a descendant, Frederick, who was killed in action at sea in 1940.

The Harker memorial was in a neglected state in 2006, but it was discovered that there was a forgotten Harker Trust Fund which had been set up to maintain both the memorial and churchyard. Members of the National Federation of Cemetery Friends began to restore the monument.

Parliament of the United Kingdom
Preceded by George Goschen	Member of Parliament for Ripon; 1885–86	Succeeded by John Lloyd Wharton
