= Nathaniel Lloyd =

English jurist (1669–1745)

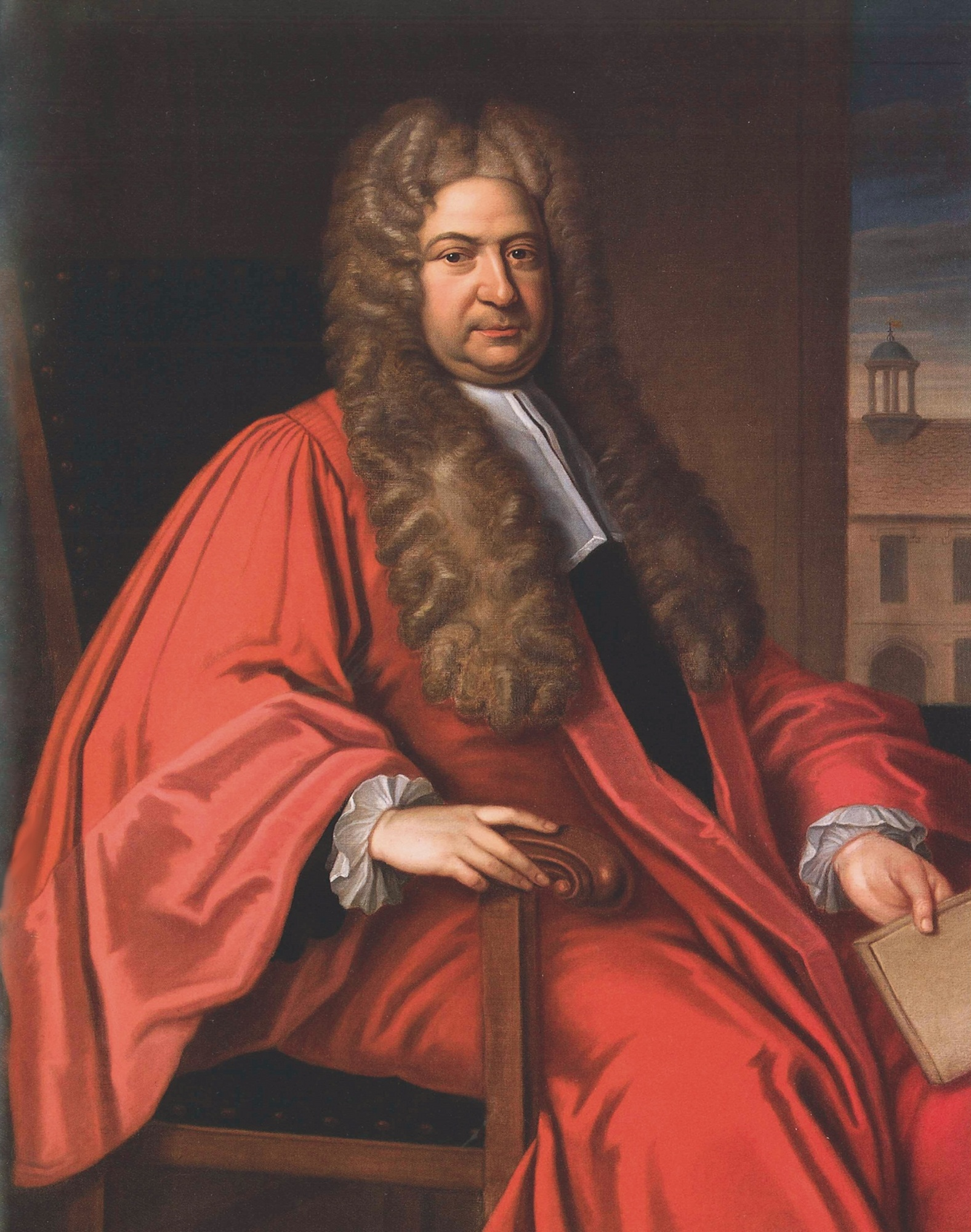
c. 1745 portrait of Lloyd by Thomas Gibson

Sir Nathaniel Lloyd (29 November 1669 – 30 March 1745) was an English jurist who served as master of Trinity Hall, Cambridge.

== Life ==
Born in the Savoy Hospital 29 November 1669, eldest son of Sir Richard Lloyd by Elizabeth, his wife. He was educated at St Paul's School and Trinity College, Oxford, where he matriculated 9 April 1685. He was elected fellow of All Souls' College in 1689, graduated B.C.L. 22 June 1691, and proceeded D.C.L. 30 June 1696, in which year he was admitted a member of the College of Advocates (21 November).

Lloyd was appointed deputy admiralty Advocate during the absence of Dr. Henry Newton on 15 Nov. 1701, and was king's advocate from 1715 to 1727. He was knighted 29 May 1710, and the same year was incorporated at Cambridge, and admitted (20 June) master of Trinity Hall, the chapel of which he enlarged and to which he bequeathed £3,000 to rebuild the hall. He resigned the mastership on 1 October 1735, died at Sunbury-on-Thames on 30 March 1745, and was buried in Trinity Hall Chapel on 8 April.
