= William Charles Harland =

British politician (1803–1863)

William Charles Harland (25 January 1803 – 10 March 1863) was a British politician.

Harland lived at Sutton Hall in Yorkshire, and was a cousin of George Eden, 1st Earl of Auckland. He stood in Durham at the 1832 UK general election and was elected as a Whig. He focused on supporting reforms to the church, repeal of many taxes, including the window tax and taxes on luxuries. He opposed the introduction of secret ballots or shortening Parliamentary terms.

Harland was re-elected at the 1835 and 1837 UK general elections, and stood down in 1841.

Parliament of the United Kingdom
Preceded by William Chaytor; Arthur Hill-Trevor	Member of Parliament for City of Durham; 1832–1841; With: William Chaytor (1832–1835); Arthur Hill-Trevor (1835–1841)	Succeeded by Robert FitzRoy; Thomas Colpitts Granger
