= Robert Eden Duncombe Shafto =

British politician

Member of Parliament for City of Durham
- In office 1804–1806
- Preceded by: Richard Wharton
- Succeeded by: Richard Wharton

High Sheriff of Durham
- In office 1842–1843
- Preceded by: William Russell
- Succeeded by: Edward Shippersden

Personal details
- Born: 23 March 1776
- Died: 17 January 1848 (aged 71)
- Spouse: Catherine Eden
- Children: 3
- Parent(s): Bobby Shafto (father); Anne Duncombe (mother)

Robert Eden Duncombe Shafto (23 March 1776 – 17 January 1848) of Whitworth Hall, Spennymoor, County Durham, was a British politician. He was Member of Parliament (MP) for the City of Durham from 1804 to 1806. He served as High Sheriff of Durham in 1842.

Robert Eden Duncombe Shafto was born on 23 March 1776 to Robert "Bobby" Shafto and Anne Duncombe, daughter of Thomas Dumcombe. His father had served also as Member of Parliament for City of Durham, and for Downton, and was also the subject of nursery rhyme, "Bobby Shafto's Gone to Sea".

Robert Eden Dumcombe Shafto married Catherine Eden, daughter of Sir John Eden, 4th Baronet, and Dorothea Johnson, and had three children;

- Rev. Slingsby Duncombe Shafto
- Robert Duncombe Shafto
- Rev. John Duncombe Shafto

== Sources ==
- Leigh Rayment's Historical List of MPs

Parliament of the United Kingdom
Preceded by Richard Wharton and Ralph John Lambton	Member of Parliament for City of Durham; 1804–1806; With: Ralph John Lambton	Succeeded by Richard Wharton and Ralph John Lambton
