= Matthew Fowler =

British Liberal politician

Matthew Fowler

Matthew Fowler JP MP (1845 – 13 June 1898), was a British Liberal Party politician.

Fowler was the son of Alderman Fowler who was five times Mayor of Durham. Like his father Fowler was also Mayor of Durham. He was appointed a Justice of the peace. He was the successful Liberal candidate for the City of Durham at the 1892 General Election. He was re-elected at the 1895 General Election. Fowler was elected an Alderman of Durham City in 1897.

Parliament of the United Kingdom
Preceded by Thomas Milvain	Member of Parliament for Durham; 1892 – 1898	Succeeded by Arthur Elliot
