= Gerry Steinberg =

British politician

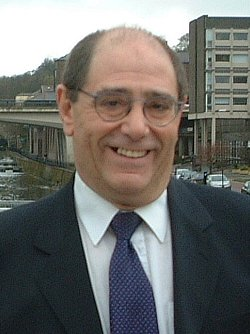

Member of Parliament for City of Durham
- In office 11 June 1987 – 11 April 2005
- Preceded by: Mark Hughes
- Succeeded by: Roberta Blackman-Woods

Personal details
- Born: Gerald Neil Steinberg; 20 April 1945 Durham, England
- Died: 19 August 2015 (aged 70) Sunderland, England
- Party: Labour
- Spouse: Margaret Thornton (m. 1969)
- Children: 2
- Education: Sheffield Hallam University, Northumbria University

Gerald Neil Steinberg (20 April 1945 – 19 August 2015) was a Labour Party politician in the United Kingdom. He was Member of Parliament for the City of Durham from 1987 until his retirement at the 2005 general election.

== Early life ==
The son of Jewish parents Harry and Esther Steinberg, Gerry Steinberg attended St Margaret's CE Primary School in Durham and then Whinney Hill Secondary Modern School and Johnston Grammar School (both schools now known as Durham Johnston Comprehensive School) on Crossgate Moor. He gained a Teachers Certificate at Sheffield College of Education (now a campus of Sheffield Hallam University) on Collegiate Crescent in Sheffield, and later a Diploma of Education (DipEd) of Backward Children (Special Educational Needs) at Newcastle Polytechnic (now Northumbria University Coach Lane Campus).

He started teaching at Hexham Camp School in 1966, then moved to Elemore Hall in County Durham in 1969. From 1975 to 1987 he was at Whitworth House Special School in Spennymoor, where he became Head Teacher. He joined the Labour Party in 1969, and became election agent for Durham MP Mark Hughes in 1973. He was elected to Durham City Council in May 1975. He was Secretary of the Labour Group on the City Council from 1981 to 1987, and Co-Leader of the Council from 1983 to 1987.

== Parliamentary career ==
In 1985 he was selected from a short list of six to be the Labour parliamentary candidate for Durham City, after Hughes had decided not to stand again. Steinberg was elected as the Member of Parliament in June 1987 until he stood down in 2005, achieving Labour's highest ever majority of over 22,000 votes, in 1997. He was a member of a number of Parliamentary Committees, including the Education & Skills Select Committee and the Public Accounts Committee.

== Personal life ==
Steinberg was admitted as an Honorary Freeman of the City of Durham on 8 December 2005.

On 25 August 1969 he married Margaret Thornton, a teacher; the couple had two children, Harry and Lyanne.

Steinberg died from cancer in the City of Sunderland on 19 August 2015, at the age of 70.

Parliament of the United Kingdom
Preceded by Mark Hughes	Member of Parliament for City of Durham; 1987–2005	Succeeded by Roberta Blackman-Woods
