= City of Durham (constituency) =

Parliamentary constituency in the United Kingdom, 1678 onwards

Coordinates: 54.77°N 1.61°W

- County constituency for the House of Commons
- Interactive map of boundaries since 2024
- Location within North East England
- County: County Durham
- Population: 94,375 (2011 census)
- Electorate: 72,878 (March 2020)
- Major settlements: Durham, Brandon, Coxhoe, Bowburn, Framwellgate Moor, Sherburn and Ushaw Moor

Current constituency
- Created: 1918
- Member of Parliament: Mary Kelly Foy (Labour)
- Seats: One

1885–1918
- Seats: One
- Type of constituency: Borough constituency

1678–1885
- Seats: Two
- Type of constituency: Borough constituency

City of Durham is a constituency (Note: A county constituency (for the purposes of election expenses and type of returning officer)) represented in the House of Commons of the UK Parliament since 2019 by Mary Kelly Foy of the Labour Party. (Note: As with all constituencies, the constituency elects one Member of Parliament (MP) by the first past the post system of election at least every five years.)

== Constituency profile ==
The constituency contains a large minority of students, researchers and academics at the early 19th century founded University of Durham, (Note: In the 2001 Census 14.5% of those aged 16–74 were further education students and 2.4% were students aged 16 or 17 such as at a sixth form or college.) that has a claim towards being the third oldest in England and has elected Labour MPs since 1935, although there have been strong SDP–Liberal Alliance and Liberal Democrat challenges to Labour since the 1980s.

The constituency includes a number of surrounding villages and suburbs as well as Durham itself, the largest of these are Brandon, Bowburn, Esh Winning, Framwellgate Moor, Sherburn, Ushaw Moor and Willington. The seat extends as far west as Satley and as far east as Shadforth.

The seat has traditionally been dominated by Labour, with support particularly strong in those villages historically connected to County Durham's mining industry. Durham is famous as an educational centre, for Durham University and the feepaying preparatory school, Chorister School where Tony Blair was educated. The city centre is more inclined to the Liberal Democrats. Like many other university cities such as Cambridge and Oxford, in the 2005 election it swung strongly towards the Liberal Democrats, one possible reason being these cities' sizeable student population who were viewed as being hostile to Labour's policies on areas such as top-up fees and the Iraq War. The Liberal Democrats were able to reduce Labour's majority by over 10,000 votes, although they were still unable to gain the seat from Labour, as was the case in the 2010 election. As reflected in throughout the country, the Liberal Democrat vote collapsed in the 2015 election.

== History ==
=== The parliamentary borough (1678–1918) ===
The City of Durham was first given the right to return Members to Parliament by the Durham (Representation of) Act 1672 (25 Cha. 2. c. 9), although the first election was not held until 1678 due to drafting errors. It was the last new borough but one to be enfranchised before the Great Reform Act 1832. It was the only borough in County Durham, the county also having been unrepresented until the same act of Parliament also created two MPs for the county. Both constituencies were frequently referred to simply as Durham, which can make for some confusion.

The constituency as constituted in 1678 consisted only of the city of Durham itself, though this included its suburbs which were within the municipal boundary. The right to vote was held by the corporation and the freemen of the city, many of whom were not resident within the boundaries. Unlike the situation in many small rotten boroughs, the corporation had no jurisdiction over the creation of freemen: freemen were generally created by connection with companies of trade, either by apprenticeship or by birth (by being the son of an existing freeman), though the common council of the city had a power to create honorary freemen.

The creation of honorary freemen with the specific intention of swaying elections was a common abuse in a number of boroughs in the 18th century, and at the Durham election of 1762 became sufficiently controversial to force a change in the law. The election was disputed because 215 new freemen, most of them not resident in the city, had been made after the writ for the election was issued. The existing freemen petitioned against this dilution of their voting rights, the candidate who had been declared elected was unseated by the Commons committee which heard the case, and the following year the Freemen (Admission) Act 1763 (3 Geo. 3. c. 15) was passed to prevent any honorary freeman from voting in a borough election within twelve months of their being accorded that status.

Through having a freeman franchise the electorate was comparatively numerous for the period, though comprising only a small fraction of the city's population; at the time of the Reform Act 1832 there were between 1,100 and 1,200 freemen in total, of whom 427 were resident and 558 lived within seven miles, while the total population of the borough was 9,269. The Lambton and Tempest families were influential, and were generally able to secure election, but fell far short of the sort of control common in pocket boroughs.

The city retained both its MPs under the Reform Act 1832, with its boundaries adjusted only very slightly, although as elsewhere the franchise was reformed. The Reform Act 1867 extended the boundaries to include part of Framwellgate parish which had previously been excluded. Under the Redistribution of Seats Act 1885, the borough's representation was reduced from the 1885 general election to a single MP. In the boundary changes of 1918, the borough was abolished, but a division of County Durham was named after the city.

=== County constituency (since 1918) ===
From 1918, Durham City was included in a county constituency officially called The Durham Division of (County) Durham, consisting of the central part of the county. In the 1983 boundary changes, the constituency officially acquired the unambiguous City of Durham name for the first time and its boundaries were realigned to match the new City of Durham local government district.

== Boundaries ==
=== Historic ===
==== 1918–1950 ====
- the Borough of Durham
- the Urban District of Hetton
- the Rural District of Durham except the parish of Brancepeth
- in the Rural District of Houghton-le-Spring, the parishes of East Rainton, Great Eppleton, Little Eppleton, Moor House, Moorsley, and West Rainton.

As well as absorbing the abolished parliamentary borough, the reconstituted seat included Hetton-le-Hole and surrounding rural areas, transferred from Houghton-le-Spring, and northern areas of the abolished Mid Division of Durham.

==== 1950–1974 ====
- the Borough of Durham
- the Urban Districts of Hetton and Spennymoor
- the Rural District of Durham.

Spennymoor and the parish of Brancepeth transferred in from the abolished constituency of Spennymoor. Other minor changes (the Rural District of Houghton-le-Spring had been abolished and absorbed into neighbouring local authorities).

==== 1974–1983 ====
- the Borough of Durham and Framwelgate
- the Rural District of Sedgefield and the Rural District of Durham except the parish of Brancepeth.

Hetton transferred back to Houghton-le-Spring, and Spennymoor and Brancepeth now included in Durham North West. Gained the Rural District of Sedgefield from the abolished constituency of Sedgefield.

==== 1983–2024 ====
Map of boundaries 1983–2024

- The City of Durham.

Sedgefield returned to the re-established constituency thereof. Gained the area comprising the former Urban District of Brandon and Byshottles which had been absorbed into the District of the City of Durham, previously part of North West Durham.

Following reviews of parliamentary representation in County Durham in 1995 and 2007, the Boundary Commission for England made no changes to the City of Durham constituency. In the 2009 structural changes to local government in England, the local authority districts in Durham were abolished and replaced with a single unitary authority; however, this did not affect the boundaries of the constituency.

=== Current ===
Further to the 2023 review of Westminster constituencies, which came into effect for the 2024 general election, the constituency was defined as composing the following electoral divisions of County Durham ( as they existed on 1 December 2020):

- Belmont; Brandon; Deerness; Durham South; Elvet and Gilesgate; Esh and Witton Gilbert; Framwellgate and Newton Hall; Neville's Cross; Sherburn; and Willington and Hunwick.
Coxhoe was transferred to the new constituency of Newton Aycliffe and Spennymoor, offset by gains from the abolished constituency of North West Durham, including the communities of Esh and Willington.

Further to a local government boundary review which came into effect in May 2025, the constituency now comprises the following electoral divisions of County Durham:

- Belmont; Brandon; Deerness; Easington and Shotton (small part); Elvet, Gilesgate and Shincliffe; Framwellgate and Newton Hall; Langley and Esh; Lumley and West Rainton (small part - including West Rainton); Neville's Cross; Pittington and Sherburn; Sacriston and Witton Gilbert (small part - including Witton Gilbert); Willington and Hunwick (nearly all).

== Members of Parliament ==
=== Durham City (borough) ===
- Constituency created 1678

==== MPs 1678–1885 ====
Year	First member	First party	Second member	Second party
1678	Sir Ralph Cole		John Parkhurst	
February 1679	Sir Ralph Cole		William Tempest	
September 1679	William Blakiston		Sir Richard Lloyd	
1681	William Tempest		Sir Richard Lloyd	
1685	Charles Montagu		Sir Richard Lloyd	
1689	George Morland		Henry Liddell	
1690	George Morland		William Tempest	
1695	Charles Montagu		Henry Liddell	
1698	Charles Montagu		Thomas Conyers	Tory
1701	Charles Montagu		Sir Henry Belasyse	
1702	Thomas Conyers	Tory	Sir Henry Belasyse	
1708	Thomas Conyers	Tory	James Nicolson	
1710	Thomas Conyers	Tory	Sir Henry Belasyse	Tory
1712	Thomas Conyers	Tory	Robert Shafto	Tory
1713	Thomas Conyers	Tory	George Baker	Tory
1722	Thomas Conyers	Tory	Charles Talbot	Whig
1727	Robert Shafto	Tory	Charles Talbot	Whig
1730	John Shafto	Tory	Charles Talbot	Whig
1734	John Shafto	Tory	Henry Lambton	Whig
1742	John Tempest		Henry Lambton	Whig
1761	John Tempest		Ralph Gowland	
1762	John Tempest		Major General John Lambton	
1768	John Tempest	Tory	Major General John Lambton	
1787	John Tempest	Tory	William Henry Lambton	Whig
1794	Sir Henry Vane-Tempest	Tory	William Henry Lambton	Whig
1798	Sir Henry Vane-Tempest	Tory	Ralph John Lambton	Whig
1800	Michael Angelo Taylor	Whig	Ralph John Lambton	Whig
1802	Richard Wharton	Tory	Ralph John Lambton	Whig
1804	Robert Eden Duncombe Shafto		Ralph John Lambton	Whig
1806	Richard Wharton	Tory	Ralph John Lambton	Whig
1813	Richard Wharton	Tory	George Allan	Tory
1818	Richard Wharton	Tory	Michael Angelo Taylor	Whig
1820	Sir Henry Hardinge	Tory	Michael Angelo Taylor	Whig
1830	Sir Roger Gresley	Tory	Michael Angelo Taylor	Whig
March 1831	William Chaytor	Whig	Michael Angelo Taylor	Whig
May 1831	William Chaytor	Whig	Hon. Arthur Trevor	Tory
1832	William Chaytor	Whig	William Charles Harland	Whig
1835	Hon. Arthur Trevor	Conservative	William Charles Harland	Whig
1841	Thomas Colpitts Granger	Radical	Robert FitzRoy	Conservative
April 1843	Thomas Colpitts Granger	Radical	The Viscount Dungannon	Conservative
July 1843	Thomas Colpitts Granger	Radical	John Bright	Radical/Anti-Corn Law
1847	Thomas Colpitts Granger	Radical	Henry John Spearman	Whig
July 1852	Thomas Colpitts Granger	Radical	William Atherton	Radical
December 1852	Lord Adolphus Vane	Conservative	William Atherton	Radical
1853	John Mowbray	Conservative	William Atherton	Radical
1859	John Mowbray	Conservative	William Atherton	Liberal
1864	John Mowbray	Conservative	John Henderson	Liberal
1868	John Robert Davison	Liberal	John Henderson	Liberal
1871	John Lloyd Wharton	Conservative	John Henderson	Liberal
February 1874	Thomas Charles Thompson	Liberal	John Henderson	Liberal
June 1874	Farrer Herschell	Liberal	Sir Arthur Middleton	Liberal
1880	Farrer Herschell	Liberal	Thomas Charles Thompson	Liberal
1885	Representation reduced to one member			

==== MPs 1885–1918 ====
Matthew Fowler

Election	Member	Party
1885	Thomas Milvain	Conservative
1892	Matthew Fowler	Liberal
1898 by-election	Arthur Elliot	Liberal Unionist
1906	John Hills	Liberal Unionist
1918	Parliamentary borough abolished	

=== Durham, Durham/City of Durham (county constituency) ===
==== MPs since 1918 ====
Year	Member	Party
1918	John Hills	Conservative
1922	Joshua Ritson	Labour
1931	William McKeag	Liberal
1935	Joshua Ritson	Labour
1945	Charles Grey	Labour
1970	Mark Hughes	Labour
1987	Gerry Steinberg	Labour
2005	Roberta Blackman-Woods	Labour
2019	Mary Foy	Labour

== Elections ==
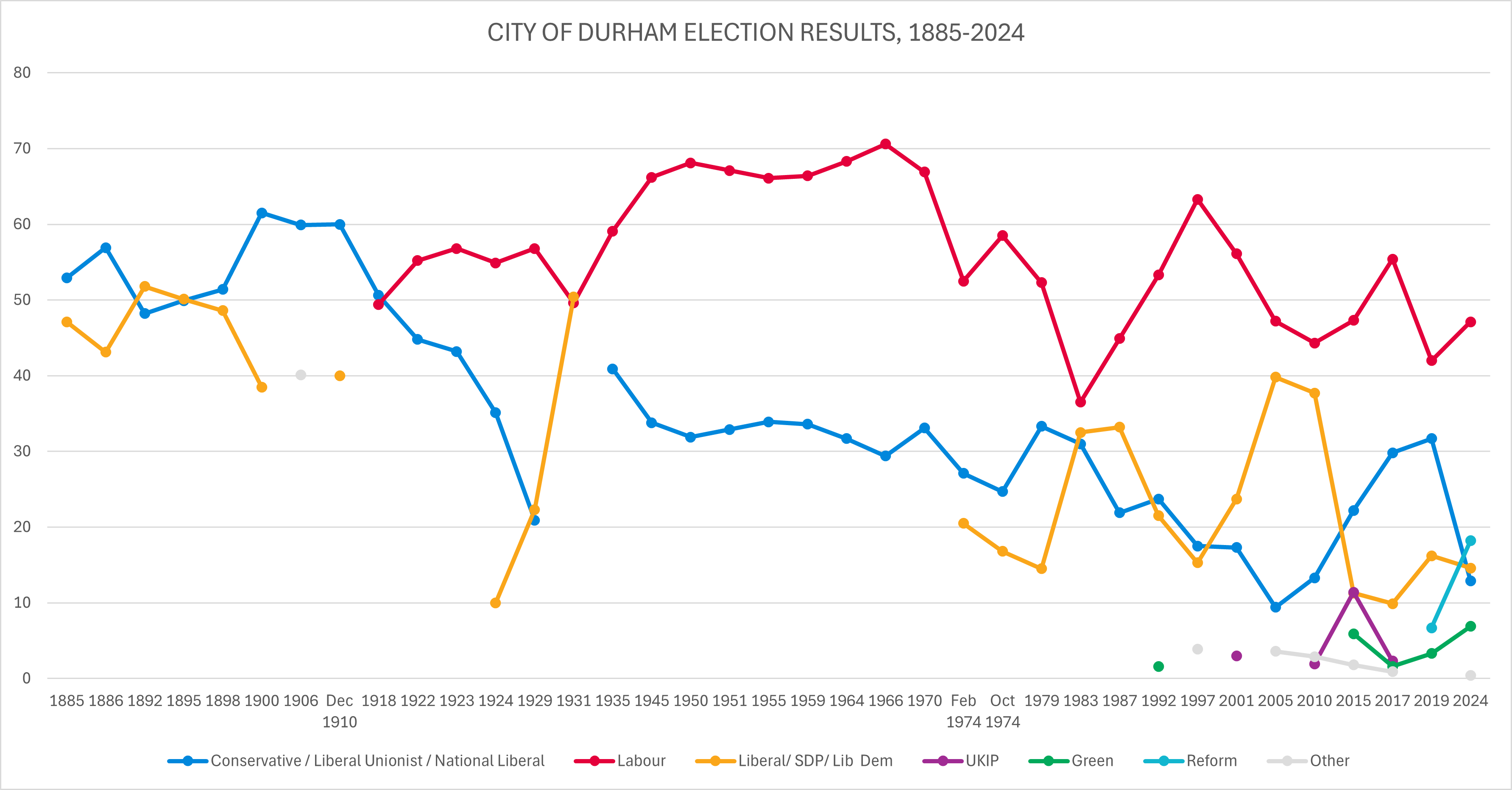
Election results 1885–2024

=== Elections in the 2020s ===
General election 2024: City of Durham
Party	Candidate	Votes	%	±%
Labour	Mary Kelly Foy	19,131	47.1	+6.2
Reform	Mark Belch	7,374	18.2	+11.6
Liberal Democrats	Mark Wilkes	5,920	14.6	−2.3
Conservative	Luke Holmes	5,221	12.9	−19.0
Green	Jonathan Elmer	2,803	6.9	+3.6
SDP	Sarah Welbourne	178	0.4	N/A
Majority		11,757	28.9	
Turnout		40,627	58.5	
Labour hold		Swing		

=== Elections in the 2010s ===
General election 2019: City of Durham
Party	Candidate	Votes	%	±%
Labour	Mary Kelly Foy	20,531	42.0	−13.4
Conservative	William Morgan	15,506	31.7	+1.9
Liberal Democrats	Amanda Hopgood	7,935	16.2	+6.3
Brexit Party	Lesley Wright	3,252	6.7	N/A
Green	Jonathan Elmer	1,635	3.3	+1.7
Majority		5,025	10.3	−15.3
Turnout		48,859	68.6	+0.7
Labour hold		Swing	−7.7	

General election 2017: City of Durham
Party	Candidate	Votes	%	±%
Labour	Roberta Blackman-Woods	26,772	55.4	+8.1
Conservative	Richard Lawrie	14,408	29.8	+7.6
Liberal Democrats	Amanda Hopgood	4,787	9.9	−1.4
UKIP	Malcolm Bint	1,116	2.3	−9.1
Green	Jonathan Elmer	797	1.6	−4.3
Independent	Jim Clark	399	0.8	N/A
Young People's	Jon Collings	45	0.1	N/A
Majority		12,364	25.6	+0.5
Turnout		48,324	67.9	+1.4
Labour hold		Swing	+0.25	

General election 2015: City of Durham
Party	Candidate	Votes	%	±%
Labour	Roberta Blackman-Woods	21,596	47.3	+3.0
Conservative	Rebecca Coulson	10,157	22.2	+8.9
UKIP	Liam Clark	5,232	11.4	+9.5
Liberal Democrats	Craig Martin	5,183	11.3	−26.4
Green	Jonathan Elmer	2,687	5.9	N/A
Independent	John Marshall	649	1.4	N/A
Independent	Jon Collings	195	0.4	N/A
Majority		11,439	25.1	+18.5
Turnout		45,699	66.5	−0.7
Labour hold		Swing	−3.0	

General election 2010: City of Durham
Party	Candidate	Votes	%	±%
Labour	Roberta Blackman-Woods	20,496	44.3	−2.9
Liberal Democrats	Carol Woods	17,429	37.7	−2.1
Conservative	Nick Varley	6,146	13.3	+3.9
BNP	Ralph Musgrave	1,153	2.5	N/A
UKIP	Nigel Coghill-Marshall	856	1.9	N/A
Independent	Jon Collings	172	0.4	N/A
Majority		3,067	6.6	−0.8
Turnout		46,252	67.2	+5.1
Labour hold		Swing	−0.4	

=== Elections in the 2000s ===
General election 2005: City of Durham
Party	Candidate	Votes	%	±%
Labour	Roberta Blackman-Woods	20,928	47.2	−8.9
Liberal Democrats	Carol Woods	17,654	39.8	+16.1
Conservative	Ben Rogers	4,179	9.4	−7.9
Veritas	Tony Martin	1,603	3.6	N/A
Majority		3,274	7.4	−25.0
Turnout		44,364	62.1	+2.5
Labour hold		Swing	−12.5	

General election 2001: City of Durham
Party	Candidate	Votes	%	±%
Labour	Gerry Steinberg	23,254	56.1	−7.2
Liberal Democrats	Carol Woods	9,813	23.7	+8.4
Conservative	Nick Cartmell	7,167	17.3	−0.2
UKIP	Chris Williamson	1,252	3.0	N/A
Majority		13,441	32.4	−13.4
Turnout		41,486	59.6	−11.2
Labour hold		Swing		

=== Elections in the 1990s ===
General election 1997: City of Durham
Party	Candidate	Votes	%	±%
Labour	Gerry Steinberg	31,102	63.3	+10.0
Conservative	Richard Chalk	8,598	17.5	−6.2
Liberal Democrats	Nigel Martin	7,499	15.3	−6.2
Referendum	Margaret Robson	1,723	3.5	N/A
Natural Law	Paul Kember	213	0.4	N/A
Majority		22,504	45.8	+16.2
Turnout		49,135	70.8	−3.8
Labour hold		Swing	+8.1	

General election 1992: City of Durham
Party	Candidate	Votes	%	±%
Labour	Gerry Steinberg	27,095	53.3	+8.4
Conservative	Martin I. Woodroofe	12,037	23.7	+1.8
Liberal Democrats	Nigel Martin	10,915	21.5	−11.7
Green	Jane Banks	812	1.6	N/A
Majority		15,058	29.6	+17.9
Turnout		50,859	74.6	−3.6
Labour hold		Swing		

=== Elections in the 1980s ===
General election 1987: City of Durham
Party	Candidate	Votes	%	±%
Labour	Gerry Steinberg	23,382	44.9	+8.4
SDP	David Stoker	17,257	33.2	+0.7
Conservative	Gordon Colquhoun	11,408	21.9	−9.1
Majority		6,125	11.7	+7.7
Turnout		52,047	78.2	+3.8
Labour hold		Swing	+3.8	

General election 1983: City of Durham
Party	Candidate	Votes	%	±%
Labour	Mark Hughes	18,163	36.5	
SDP	David Stoker	16,190	32.5	
Conservative	Matthew Lavis	15,438	31.0	
Majority		1,973	4.0	
Turnout		49,791	74.4	
Labour hold		Swing		

=== Elections in the 1970s ===
General election 1979: Durham
Party	Candidate	Votes	%	±%
Labour	Mark Hughes	30,903	52.3	−6.1
Conservative	Matthew Lavis	19,666	33.3	+9.6
Liberal	Chris Foote Wood	8,572	14.5	−2.3
Majority		11,237	19.0	−15.7
Turnout		59,141	76.4	+4.8
Labour hold		Swing	−7.3	

General election October 1974: Durham
Party	Candidate	Votes	%	±%
Labour	Mark Hughes	31,305	58.5	+6.0
Conservative	Derek Conway	13,189	24.7	−2.4
Liberal	Alan Heesom	9,011	16.8	−1.7
Majority		18,116	33.9	+8.5
Turnout		53,505	71.6	−9.2
Labour hold		Swing	+4.2	

General election February 1974: Durham
Party	Candidate	Votes	%	±%
Labour	Mark Hughes	31,405	52.5	−14.4
Conservative	Timothy Kirkhope	16,202	27.1	−6.0
Liberal	Alan Heesom	12,235	20.5	N/A
Majority		15,203	25.4	−8.4
Turnout		59,842	80.8	+7.5
Labour hold		Swing	−4.2	

General election 1970: Durham
Party	Candidate	Votes	%	±%
Labour	Mark Hughes	33,766	66.9	−3.7
Conservative	Ernest Greenwood	16,707	33.1	+3.7
Majority		17,059	33.8	−4.1
Turnout		50,473	73.3	−1.4
Labour hold		Swing	−3.7	

=== Elections in the 1960s ===
General election 1966: Durham
Party	Candidate	Votes	%	±%
Labour	Charles Grey	32,200	70.6	+2.3
Conservative	Richard Yorke	13,383	29.4	−2.3
Majority		18,817	41.2	+4.6
Turnout		45,583	74.7	−4.1
Labour hold		Swing		

General election 1964: Durham
Party	Candidate	Votes	%	±%
Labour	Charles Grey	32,818	68.3	+1.9
Conservative	Joseph Whittaker	15,209	31.7	−1.9
Majority		17,609	36.7	+3.8
Turnout		48,027	78.8	−3.0
Labour hold		Swing		

=== Elections in the 1950s ===
General election 1959: Durham
Party	Candidate	Votes	%	±%
Labour	Charles Grey	33,795	66.4	+0.3
Conservative	Charles MacCarthy	17,106	33.6	−0.3
Majority		16,689	32.8	+0.7
Turnout		50,901	81.8	+2.3
Labour hold		Swing		

General election 1955: Durham
Party	Candidate	Votes	%	±%
Labour	Charles Grey	32,412	66.1	−1.0
Conservative	Charles P. MacCarthy	16,640	33.9	+1.0
Majority		15,772	32.2	+2.0
Turnout		49,052	79.5	−6.6
Labour hold		Swing		

General election 1951: Durham
Party	Candidate	Votes	%	±%
Labour	Charles Grey	35,597	67.1	−1.0
Conservative	Robert Fisher	17,447	32.9	+1.0
Majority		18,150	34.2	−2.0
Turnout		53,044	86.1	−0.9
Labour hold		Swing		

General election 1950: Durham
Party	Candidate	Votes	%	±%
Labour	Charles Grey	36,024	68.1	
Conservative	Henry Laslett	16,903	31.9	
Majority		19,121	36.2	
Turnout		52,927	87.0	
Labour hold		Swing		

=== Election in the 1940s ===
General election 1945: Durham
Party	Candidate	Votes	%	±%
Labour	Charles Grey	24,135	66.2	+7.1
National Liberal	John Bunyan	12,331	33.8	−7.1
Majority		11,804	32.4	+14.3
Turnout		36,466	79.8	−5.4
Labour hold		Swing		

=== Elections in the 1930s ===
General election 1935: Durham
Party	Candidate	Votes	%	±%
Labour	Joshua Ritson	21,517	59.1	+9.5
National Liberal	William McKeag	14,910	40.9	N/A
Majority		6,607	18.1	N/A
Turnout		36,427	85.2	+1.5
Labour gain from Liberal		Swing		

General election 1931: Durham
Party	Candidate	Votes	%	±%
Liberal	William McKeag	17,406	50.4	+28.1
Labour	Joshua Ritson	17,136	49.6	−7.2
Majority		270	0.8	N/A
Turnout		34,542	83.7	+3.6
Liberal gain from Labour		Swing		

=== Elections in the 1920s ===
General election 1929: Durham
Party	Candidate	Votes	%	±%
Labour	Joshua Ritson	18,514	56.8	+1.9
Liberal	William McKeag	7,266	22.3	+12.3
Unionist	George Hamilton-Fletcher	6,820	20.9	−14.2
Majority		11,248	34.5	+14.7
Turnout		32,600	80.1	−5.1
Registered electors		40,676		
Labour hold		Swing	−5.2	

General election 1924: Durham
Party	Candidate	Votes	%	±%
Labour	Joshua Ritson	15,032	54.9	−1.9
Unionist	Sidney Streatfeild	9,614	35.1	−8.1
Liberal	William McKeag	2,747	10.0	N/A
Majority		5,418	19.8	+6.2
Turnout		27,393	85.2	+8.0
Registered electors		32,163		
Labour hold		Swing	+3.1	

General election 1923: Durham
Party	Candidate	Votes	%	±%
Labour	Joshua Ritson	13,819	56.8	+1.6
Unionist	Thomas Bradford	10,530	43.2	−1.6
Majority		3,289	13.6	+3.2
Turnout		24,349	77.2	−4.7
Registered electors		31,523		
Labour hold		Swing	+1.6	

General election 1922: Durham
Party	Candidate	Votes	%	±%
Labour	Joshua Ritson	14,068	55.2	+5.8
Unionist	John Hills	11,396	44.8	−5.8
Majority		2,672	10.4	N/A
Turnout		25,464	81.9	+20.5
Registered electors		31,104		
Labour gain from Unionist		Swing	+1.8	

=== Elections in the 1910s ===
General election 1918: Durham
Party		Candidate	Votes	%	±%
C	Unionist	John Hills	9,027	50.6	
	Labour	Joshua Ritson	8,809	49.4	N/A
Majority			218	1.2	
Turnout			17,836	61.4	
	Unionist hold		Swing		
C indicates candidate endorsed by the coalition government.

General election December 1910: Durham
Party	Candidate	Votes	%	±%
Liberal Unionist	John Hills	1,313	60.0	N/A
Liberal	Cecil Cochrane	877	40.0	N/A
Majority		436	20.0	N/A
Turnout		2,190	84.2	N/A
Liberal Unionist hold		Swing		

General election January 1910: Durham
Party	Candidate	Votes	%	±%
Liberal Unionist	John Hills	Unopposed		
Liberal Unionist hold				

=== Elections in the 1900s ===
General election 1906: Durham
Party	Candidate	Votes	%	±%
Liberal Unionist	John Hills	1,313	59.9	−1.6
Free Trader	Arthur Elliot (Note: Supported by the local Liberal association)	880	40.1	+1.6
Majority		433	19.8	−3.2
Turnout		2,193	85.0	+7.1
Registered electors		2,580		
Liberal Unionist hold		Swing		

General election 1900: Durham
Party	Candidate	Votes	%	±%
Liberal Unionist	Arthur Elliot	1,250	61.5	+11.6
Liberal	William Geary	781	38.5	−11.6
Majority		469	23.0	N/A
Turnout		2,031	77.9	−11.4
Registered electors		2,607		
Liberal Unionist gain from Liberal		Swing	+11.4	

=== Elections in the 1890s ===
By-election, 1898: Durham
Party	Candidate	Votes	%	±%
Liberal Unionist	Arthur Elliot	1,167	51.4	+1.5
Liberal	H.F. Boyd	1,102	48.6	−1.5
Majority		65	2.8	N/A
Turnout		2,269	89.1	−0.2
Registered electors		2,548		
Liberal Unionist gain from Liberal		Swing	+1.5	

- Caused by Fowler's death.

General election 1895: Durham
Party	Candidate	Votes	%	±%
Liberal	Matthew Fowler	1,110	50.1	−1.7
Liberal Unionist	Arthur Elliot	1,107	49.9	+1.7
Majority		3	0.2	−3.4
Turnout		2,217	89.3	−0.1
Registered electors		2,482		
Liberal hold		Swing	−1.7	

- These are the final 1895 results after a recount. The original result was Fowler with 1,111 votes, and Elliot with 1,110 votes, leaving a Liberal majority of just one vote.

General election 1892: Durham
Party	Candidate	Votes	%	±%
Liberal	Matthew Fowler	1,075	51.8	+8.7
Conservative	Thomas Milvain	1,000	48.2	−8.7
Majority		75	3.6	N/A
Turnout		2,075	89.4	+3.2
Registered electors		2,322		
Liberal gain from Conservative		Swing	+8.7	

=== Elections in the 1880s ===
General election 1886: Durham (1 seat)
Party	Candidate	Votes	%	±%
Conservative	Thomas Milvain	1,129	56.9	+4.0
Liberal	George Brooks	855	43.1	−4.0
Majority		274	13.8	+8.0
Turnout		1,984	86.2	−5.3
Registered electors		2,302		
Conservative hold		Swing	−4.0	

General election 1885: Durham (1 seat)
Party	Candidate	Votes	%	±%
Conservative	Thomas Milvain	1,114	52.9	+22.2
Liberal	Thomas Charles Thompson	993	47.1	−22.2
Majority		121	5.8	N/A
Turnout		2,107	91.5	−6.1
Conservative gain from Liberal		Swing		

By-election, 10 May 1880: Durham (1 seat)
Party	Candidate	Votes	%	±%
Liberal	Farrer Herschell	Unopposed		
Liberal hold				

- Caused by Herschell's appointment as Solicitor General for England and Wales

General election 1880: Durham (2 seats)
Party	Candidate	Votes	%	±%
Liberal	Thomas Charles Thompson	1,237	35.9	+1.0
Liberal	Farrer Herschell	1,152	33.4	+0.2
Conservative	John Lloyd Wharton	1,058	30.7	−1.2
Majority		94	2.7	+1.4
Turnout		2,295 (est)	97.6 (est)	+12.7
Registered electors		2,352		
Liberal hold		Swing		
Liberal hold		Swing		

=== Elections in the 1870s ===
By-election, 13 Jun 1874: Durham (2 seats)
Party	Candidate	Votes	%	±%
Liberal	Farrer Herschell	930	27.8	−7.1
Liberal	Arthur Monck (Note: Monck changed his surname to Middleton in 1876)	918	27.5	−5.7
Conservative	Francis Duncan	752	22.5	+6.5
Conservative	Francis Barrington	742	22.2	+6.2
Majority		166	5.0	+3.7
Turnout		1,671 (est)	81.2 (est)	−3.7
Registered electors		2,059		
Liberal hold		Swing	-6.8	
Liberal hold		Swing	-6.0	

- Caused by the 1874 election being declared void on petition.

General election 1874: Durham (2 seats)
Party	Candidate	Votes	%	±%
Liberal	Thomas Charles Thompson	924	34.9	+1.4
Liberal	John Henderson	879	33.2	−2.0
Conservative	John Lloyd Wharton	846	31.9	+0.6
Majority		33	1.3	−0.9
Turnout		1,748 (est)	84.9 (est)	−2.5
Registered electors		2,059		
Liberal hold		Swing	+0.6	
Liberal hold		Swing	-1.2	

By-election, 28 Apr 1871: Durham (1 seat)
Party	Candidate	Votes	%	±%
Conservative	John Lloyd Wharton	814	51.2	+19.9
Liberal	Thomas Charles Thompson	776	48.8	−19.9
Majority		38	2.4	N/A
Turnout		1,590	81.7	−5.7
Registered electors		1,946		
Conservative gain from Liberal		Swing	+19.9	

- Caused by Davison's death.

By-election, 14 Jan 1871: Durham (1 seat)
Party	Candidate	Votes	%	±%
Liberal	John Robert Davison	Unopposed		
Liberal hold				

- Caused by Davison's appointment as Judge Advocate General of the Armed Forces.

=== Elections in the 1860s ===
General election 1868: Durham (2 seats)
Party	Candidate	Votes	%	±%
Liberal	John Henderson	823	35.2	N/A
Liberal	John Robert Davison	784	33.5	N/A
Conservative	John Lloyd Wharton	732	31.3	N/A
Turnout		1,536 (est)	87.4 (est)	N/A
Majority		89	3.9	N/A
Liberal hold		Swing		
Majority		52	2.2	N/A
Liberal gain from Conservative		Swing		

By-election, 11 July 1866: Durham (1 seat)
Party	Candidate	Votes	%	±%
Conservative	John Mowbray	Unopposed		
Conservative hold				

- Caused by Mowbray's appointment as Judge Advocate General of the Armed Forces

General election 1865: Durham (2 seats)
Party	Candidate	Votes	%	±%
Liberal	John Henderson	Unopposed		
Conservative	John Mowbray	Unopposed		
Registered electors		1,056		
Liberal hold				
Conservative hold				

By-election, 9 February 1864: Durham (1 seat)
Party	Candidate	Votes	%	±%
Liberal	John Henderson	Unopposed		
Liberal hold				

- Caused by Atherton's death.

By-election, 8 July 1861: Durham (1 seat)
Party	Candidate	Votes	%	±%
Liberal	William Atherton	Unopposed		
Liberal hold				

- Caused by Atherton's appointment as Attorney General for England and Wales.

By-election, 9 January 1860: Durham (1 seat)
Party	Candidate	Votes	%	±%
Liberal	William Atherton	Unopposed		
Liberal hold				

- Caused by Atherton's appointment as Solicitor General for England and Wales.

=== Elections in the 1850s ===
General election 1859: Durham (2 seats)
Party	Candidate	Votes	%	±%
Liberal	William Atherton	Unopposed		
Conservative	John Mowbray	Unopposed		
Registered electors		1,147		
Liberal hold				
Conservative hold				

By-election, 17 March 1858: Durham (1 seat)
Party	Candidate	Votes	%	±%
Conservative	John Mowbray	Unopposed		
Conservative hold				

- Caused by Mowbray's appointment as Judge Advocate General of the Armed Forces.

General election 1857: Durham (2 seats)
Party	Candidate	Votes	%	±%
Radical	William Atherton	Unopposed		
Conservative	John Mowbray	Unopposed		
Registered electors		1,184		
Radical hold				
Conservative gain from Radical				

By-election, 25 June 1853: Durham (1 seat)
Party	Candidate	Votes	%	±%
Conservative	John Mowbray	529	54.4	+22.5
Whig	Charles Eurwicke Douglas	444	45.6	−22.6
Majority		85	8.8	N/A
Turnout		973	88.9	−1.5
Registered electors		1,094		
Void election result		Swing	+22.6	

- Caused by the earlier by-election being declared void on petition due to bribery.

By-election, 3 December 1852: Durham (1 seat)
Party	Candidate	Votes	%	±%
Conservative	Adolphus Vane-Tempest	545	52.4	+20.5
Whig	Henry Fenwick	496	47.6	−20.6
Majority		49	4.8	N/A
Turnout		1,041	95.2	+4.8
Registered electors		1,094		
Conservative gain from Radical		Swing	+20.6	

- Caused by Granger's death.

General election 1852: Durham (2 seats)
Party	Candidate	Votes	%	±%
Radical	Thomas Colpitts Granger	571	36.0	−2.0
Radical	William Atherton	510	32.2	−1.0
Conservative	Adolphus Vane-Tempest	506	31.9	+3.1
Majority		4	0.3	N/A
Turnout		1,047 (est)	90.4 (est)	+3.7
Registered electors		1,157		
Radical hold		Swing	−1.8	
Radical gain from Whig		Swing	−1.3	

=== Elections in the 1840s ===
General election 1847: Durham (2 seats)
Party	Candidate	Votes	%
Radical	Thomas Colpitts Granger	595	38.0
Whig	Henry John Spearman	519	33.2
Conservative	David Edward Wood	450	28.8
Turnout		1,007 (est)	86.7 (est)
Majority		76	4.8
Radical hold			
Majority		69	4.4
Whig gain from Conservative			

By-election, 26 July 1843: Durham
Party	Candidate	Votes	%
Radical	John Bright	488	54.3
Conservative	Thomas Purvis	410	45.7
Majority		78	8.6
Turnout		898	81.2
Radical gain from Conservative			

- Caused by the by-election being declared void on petition due to bribery by Hill-Trevor's agents.

By-election, 5 April 1843: Durham
Party	Candidate	Votes	%
Conservative	Arthur Hill-Trevor	507	55.6
Radical	John Bright	405	44.4
Majority		102	11.2
Turnout		912	82.5
Conservative hold			

- Caused by FitzRoy's appointment as Governor of New Zealand

General election 1841: Durham (2 seats)
Party	Candidate	Votes	%	±%
Conservative	Robert FitzRoy	Unopposed		
Radical	Thomas Colpitts Granger	Unopposed		
Registered electors		1,022		
Conservative hold				
Radical gain from Conservative				

=== Elections in the 1830s ===
General election 1837: Durham (2 seats)
Party	Candidate	Votes	%	±%
Conservative	Arthur Hill-Trevor	465	38.5	+0.8
Whig	William Charles Harland	373	30.9	−3.6
Radical	Thomas Colpitts Granger	371	30.7	+2.8
Turnout		857	90.3	−2.6
Registered electors		949		
Majority		92	7.6	+4.4
Conservative hold		Swing	+2.2	
Majority		2	0.2	−6.4
Whig hold		Swing	−2.2	

General election 1835: Durham (2 seats)
Party	Candidate	Votes	%	±%
Conservative	Arthur Hill-Trevor	473	37.7	+6.5
Whig	William Charles Harland	433	34.5	−34.3
Radical	Thomas Colpitts Granger	350	27.9	N/A
Turnout		829	92.9	−2.4
Registered electors		892		
Majority		40	3.2	N/A
Conservative gain from Whig		Swing	+20.4	
Majority		83	6.6	+4.9
Whig hold		Swing	−20.4	

General election 1832: Durham (2 seats)
Party	Candidate	Votes	%
Whig	William Charles Harland	440	35.9
Whig	William Chaytor	404	32.9
Tory	Arthur Hill-Trevor	383	31.2
Majority		21	1.7
Turnout		768	95.3
Registered electors		806	
Whig win (new boundaries)			
Whig win (new boundaries)			

General election 1831: Durham (2 seats)
Party	Candidate	Votes	%
Whig	William Chaytor	Unopposed	
Tory	Arthur Hill-Trevor	Unopposed	
Registered electors		c. 1,200	
Whig hold			
Tory hold			

By-election, 23 March 1831: Durham
Party	Candidate	Votes	%	±%
Whig	William Chaytor	495	51.1	+13.9
Tory	Arthur Hill-Trevor	470	48.6	+15.5
Whig	John Clervaux Chaytor	3	0.3	−29.4
Majority		25	2.5	N/A
Turnout		968	c. 80.7	
Registered electors		c. 1,200		
Whig gain from Tory		Swing	−0.8	

- Caused by Gresley being unseated on petition.

General election 1830: Durham (2 seats)
Party	Candidate	Votes	%
Whig	Michael Angelo Taylor	546	37.2
Tory	Roger Gresley	486	33.1
Whig	William Chaytor, Senior	436	29.7
Turnout		988	
Registered electors			
Majority		60	4.1
Whig hold			
Majority		50	3.4
Tory hold			

== See also ==
- List of parliamentary constituencies in County Durham
- History of parliamentary constituencies and boundaries in Durham

== Sources ==
- F W S Craig, "British Parliamentary Election Results 1832–1885" (2nd edition, Aldershot: Parliamentary Research Services, 1989)
- J Holladay Philbin, "Parliamentary Representation 1832 – England and Wales" (New Haven: Yale University Press, 1965)
- Michael Kinnear, "The British Voter" (London: Batsford, 1968)
- E Porritt and AG Porritt, "The Unreformed House of Commons, Vol I: England and Wales" (Cambridge: Cambridge University Press, 1903)
- Henry Stooks Smith, The Parliaments of England from 1715 to 1847 (2nd edition, edited by FWS Craig – Chichester: Parliamentary Reference Publications, 1973)
- Robert Waller, "The Almanac of British Politics" (3rd edition, London: Croom Helm, 1987)
- Frederic A Youngs, jr, "Guide to the Local Administrative Units of England, Vol II" (London: Royal Historical Society, 1991)
- The Constitutional Yearbook, 1913" (London: National Unionist Association, 1913)
- Leigh Rayment's Historical List of MPs – Constituencies beginning with "D" (part 4)
