= Sir William Chaytor, 2nd Baronet =

Sir William Richard Carter Chaytor, 2nd Baronet (7 February 1805 – 9 February 1871) was a British politician and businessman.

Chaytor was the eldest son of Sir William Chaytor, 1st Baronet, by his wife Isabella, daughter of John Carter. He was Whig Member of Parliament for the City of Durham from 1831 to 1835 and, with his father, a supporter of Earl Grey and of the Reform Act 1832. However, Chaytor was criticised for being an ineffectual MP and neglecting his duties.

Chaytor married firstly Annie Lacy in 1836. After her death in childbirth in 1837 he married secondly a Miss Smith, daughter of John Whitney Smith, in 1852. There were children from both marriages. Chaytor died in February 1871, aged 66, and was succeeded in the baronetcy by his son from his first marriage, William. Lady Chaytor died in May 1904.

Parliament of the United Kingdom
Preceded by Michael Angelo Taylor; Sir Roger Gresley	Member of Parliament for Durham; 1832–1835; With: Michael Angelo Taylor 1831; Arthur Hill-Trevor 1831–1832; William Charles Harland 1832–1835	Succeeded by William Charles Harland; Arthur Hill-Trevor
Baronetage of the United Kingdom
Preceded by William Chaytor	Baronet (of Croft and Willton Castle); 1847–1871	Succeeded by William Chaytor
