= William McKeag =

English politician (1897–1972)

William McKeag MSM

Chairman of Newcastle United F.C.
- In office 1957–1960
- Preceded by: Wilf Taylor
- Succeeded by: Wally Hurford

Member of Parliament for City of Durham
- In office 27 October 1931 – 14 November 1935
- Preceded by: Joshua Ritson
- Succeeded by: Joshua Ritson

Personal details
- Born: 29 June 1897 County Durham, England
- Died: 4 October 1972 (aged 75) Whitley Bay, Northumberland, England
- Party: Conservative; Liberal, National Liberal, Progressive (formerly)
- Spouse: Marie Crow (m. 1922)
- Children: 3, including Gordon
- Occupation: Politician, soldier, solicitor

William McKeag MSM (29 June 1897 – 4 October 1972) was a British politician, soldier and solicitor. His political affiliations changed over the years from Liberal to National Liberal, back to Liberal and finally to Conservative, but he never wavered from a fierce loyalty to his native North East of England and was described in his obituary in The Times as one of the North East's leading figures, a keen publicist for the area and for Tyneside in particular.

== Early life and education ==
William McKeag was born in County Durham, the son of William McKeag Sr. of Carrville near Belmont. McKeag was educated at Belmont School, at Johnston's School in Durham and privately. Afterwards, McKeag qualified as a solicitor becoming a partner in firm of Molineux McKeag and Cooper, which had offices in Newcastle upon Tyne and Durham. He later became the director of various companies.

== Military career ==
McKeag was 17 years old at the outbreak of the Great War. He joined the army and served six years in France, Italy, Turkey and Russia. He fought with the White Russian commanders Anton Ivanovich Denikin and Pyotr Nikolayevich Wrangel and during his time in Russia, he became the youngest First-Class Warrant Officer in the British Army. During his service, McKeag was awarded the Meritorious Service Medal as well as two Russian decorations, the Order of Saint Stanislaus and the Order of Saint Anne.

During the Second World War, McKeag attained the rank of Major in the infantry and was Deputy Assistant Adjutant General.

== Political career ==
=== Parliamentary career ===
At the 1924 general election, McKeag, who had reputation for being a witty and able debater was the Liberal Party candidate for Durham but lost to the Labour Party candidate Joshua Ritson who had held the seat since 1922. He fought Durham again in 1929 but was again defeated by Ritson. By the time of the 1931 general election however, the national mood was swinging against Labour. The crisis in the economy over the summer of 1931 which brought about the National Government of prime minister Ramsay MacDonald meant that McKeag fought the general election in October as a Liberal in support of the National Government, enabling him to take advantage of the public support for the coalition and win the seat by the narrow majority of 270 votes. When the Liberal Party led by Sir Herbert Samuel withdrew from the coalition in November 1933, McKeag refused to cross the floor into opposition with Samuel. He then associated himself with the Liberal National group in Parliament led by Sir John Simon at least to allow him to be the nominated National candidate at the 1935 general election, which he fought under the description Liberal National in a straight fight with the former Labour MP Joshua Ritson. Labour were confident of a political revival in 1935, attacking the government on domestic policy and the armaments programme insisting that a vote for the National Government meant a vote for war. Durham went solidly Labour with the party winning every seat in the county, including the Seaham constituency represented by Prime Minister Ramsay MacDonald.

=== Local politics ===
McKeag resumed political activity at a local level after losing his Parliamentary seat. He resumed his status as a Liberal without prefix or suffix and was elected to Newcastle City Council in 1936. He remained a member of the council for 25 years, during which time he was raised to the Aldermanic Bench, Deputy Mayor and was Mayor of the City twice, in 1951–52 and in 1953–54. In 1966, he was declared an Honorary Freeman of Newcastle.

McKeag still retained ambitions to return to Parliament as a Liberal but during the Second World War there was a truce between the main political parties which ensured that they did not oppose each other when by-elections occurred. In 1940 however the seat of Newcastle upon Tyne North became vacant on the retirement of Sir Nicholas Grattan-Doyle, the sitting Conservative MP. While the Liberals would not officially oppose the Conservative candidate, Sir Nicholas' son Second Lieutenant Howard Grattan-Doyle, McKeag was talked of as a possible Independent candidate for the by-election. However, the seat was successfully contested by an Independent Unionist, Cuthbert Headlam. In the event, McKeag did not stand, perhaps because like a large number of electors he found it distasteful to fight an election when the British Expeditionary Force was struggling to get home from the beaches of Dunkirk, perhaps because he did not wish his political career to interfere with his own war service.

McKeag retained his connection with the Liberal Party, holding the positions of President of Tynemouth Liberal Association and Vice–President of Newcastle Liberal Club and he tried again to get back to Parliament as a Liberal in Newcastle North at the 1945 general election and in 1950 at Newcastle upon Tyne East, but after this he seems to have become disillusioned with the prospects of the party.

==== Changing political allegiances ====
By the mid-1950s, McKeag's political label on Newcastle City Council was described as Progressive rather than Liberal and he was some time president of the Progressive Party in Newcastle. It was clear he had moved towards the Conservatives however, perhaps retaining links from his days as a Liberal National, because in 1957, McKeag was nominated by the old disaffiliated Newcastle North Conservative Association as a candidate in the by-election caused by the elevation to the peerage of Gwilym Lloyd George in opposition to the official Conservative. The old association was disaffiliated in 1951 when the new one was formed to accommodate Lloyd George's becoming the local MP. McKeag agreed to accept the nomination. The official Conservatives adopted a young Morpeth farmer, William Elliott and Labour chose T.L. MacDonald, a Carlisle printer. In the event, the unofficial Conservatives chose not to contest the election, which Elliott won comfortably with a majority of more than 6,000 votes.

== Other public service ==
McKeag held a long list of public offices as a result of his professional and political associations with Newcastle, County Durham and the North East of England. He was President of the Newcastle upon Tyne Law Students Association, a member of Newcastle upon Tyne Law Society Council, Under Sheriff of Newcastle upon Tyne; a Governor of Royal Victoria Infirmary; a Governor of Newcastle Royal Grammar School; Chairman of the Parliamentary Committee of Newcastle Corporation; a Member of Tyneside Industrial Development Board; a member of the Committee of the Institute of Directors of Newcastle upon Tyne; a member of the Tyne Improvement Commission, an organisation which held property along the River Tyne. He also supported many local associations and charities in the North East. He also held the position of Consul for the Republic of Iceland and was a Commander of the Order of the Falcon an Icelandic award for Icelanders and foreigners for achievements in Iceland or internationally.

McKeag was also a Director of Newcastle United F.C. for 28 years, and was for a time, its chairman. His son Gordon McKeag was also a Chairman of the club from 1988 to 1990.

== Personal life and death ==
In 1922, he married Marie Elizabeth, the daughter of William Corn Crow of Newcastle upon Tyne. They had two sons and a daughter together. McKeag died aged 75 years on 4 October 1972 at Whitley Bay.

Parliament of the United Kingdom
| Preceded by Joshua Ritson | Member of Parliament for City of Durham; 1931 – 1935 | Succeeded by Joshua Ritson |
