= Richard Wharton (politician) =

British barrister and politician

Richard Wharton (c. 1765 – 21 October 1828) was a British barrister and politician.

Wharton studied at Pembroke College, Cambridge and became barrister of the Inner Temple in 1789. He successfully stood as a Tory for the constituency of Durham in 1802, but his election was voided in February 1804, "his payment of the travelling expenses of the non-resident freemen having been construed as bribery." He was elected again in 1806, and held the seat until 1820.

Wharton was appointed Chairman of Ways and Means in January 1808, and Secretary to the Treasury in December 1809, a post he held until January 1814.

He was elected a Fellow of the Royal Society in 1810.

Samuel Egerton Brydges described Wharton as a man "of quick talents, much literature, and most pleasing manners, hospitable and open; a man of the world, of a handsome person and benevolent expression."

Parliament of the United Kingdom
Preceded by Michael Angelo Taylor; Ralph John Lambton	Member of Parliament for City of Durham; 1802 – 1804; With: Ralph John Lambton	Succeeded by Robert Eden Duncombe Shafto; Ralph John Lambton
Preceded by Robert Eden Duncombe Shafto; Ralph John Lambton	Member of Parliament for City of Durham; 1806 – 1820; With: Ralph John Lambton to 1813; George Allan 1813–18; Michael Angelo Taylor from 1818	Succeeded by Sir Henry Hardinge; Michael Angelo Taylor
