= Charles Grey (Labour politician) =

British miner and politician (1903-1984)

Charles Frederick Grey CBE (25 March 1903 – 7 September 1984) was a British miner and politician. He was also an independent Methodist Minister.

== Early life and education ==
Grey had an elementary school education and went to work in the Durham coalfield when he left school at 14. He became involved in Labour Party activities, and for many years was on the Executive Committee of the Divisional Labour Party.

== Career ==
At the 1945 general election, Grey was chosen as Labour candidate for Durham. Although centred on the cathedral city, most of the voters lived in nearby mining villages and Grey was elected.

In 1962, Grey was named as the Northern Area whip for the Parliamentary Labour Party. When Labour won the 1964 general election he became a government whip as Comptroller of Her Majesty's Household. He was promoted to Treasurer of Her Majesty's Household in July 1966. In October 1969 he gave up office and announced his retirement.

Out of parliament, Grey was President of the Independent Methodist Connexion in 1971. He was given the Freedom of the City of Durham in 1971, and was awarded an honorary degree by the University of Durham in 1976.

Parliament of the United Kingdom
Preceded by Joshua Ritson	Member of Parliament for Durham; 1945–1970	Succeeded by Mark Hughes
Political offices
Preceded by Robin Chichester-Clark	Comptroller of the Household; 1964–1966	Succeeded by William Whitlock
Preceded by John Silkin	Treasurer of the Household; 1966–1969	Succeeded by Charles Morris
