= Henry John Spearman =

Member of Parliament for Durham
- In office 31 July 1847 – 9 July 1852 Serving with Thomas Colpitts Granger
- Preceded by: Thomas Colpitts Granger; John Bright
- Succeeded by: Thomas Colpitts Granger; William Atherton

Personal details
- Born: 1794
- Died: c. October 1863
- Party: Whig

Henry John Spearman (1794 – c. October 1863) was a British Whig politician.

Spearman became a Whig Member of Parliament for Durham at the 1847 general election, and held the seat until 1852 when he did not seek re-election.

Parliament of the United Kingdom
Preceded by Thomas Colpitts Granger; John Bright	Member of Parliament for Durham; 1847–1852; With: Thomas Colpitts Granger	Succeeded by Thomas Colpitts Granger; William Atherton
