= William Atherton (politician) =

British politician

Sir William Atherton QC (October 1806 – 22 January 1864) was a Scottish barrister and Liberal Party politician. An advanced Liberal who favoured the secret ballot and widening of suffrage, he held a seat in the House of Commons from 1852 to 1864, and was a Law Officer of the Crown for four years.

== Early years ==
Atherton was the only son of a Wesleyan Methodist minister, Rev. William Atherton, and his wife Margaret who was a daughter of the Church of Scotland minister Rev. Walter Morison.

== Career ==
He was called to the bar at the Inner Temple and practised on the Northern Circuit, becoming a Queen's Counsel (QC) and a bencher in 1852. While practising below the bar he published 'An Elementary and Practical Treatise on the Commencement of Personal Actions, and the Proceedings therein to Declaration, in the Superior Courts at Westminster. Comprising the Changes effected by the Uniformity of Process Act (2 W. 4. c. 39) and recent Rules of Court.' Lond. 1833. 12mo.

He was elected at the 1852 general election as a Member of Parliament (MP) for City of Durham, and held the seat until his death in 1864.

Atherton was appointed as Solicitor General on 16 December 1859, having previously served as Counsel to the Admiralty and Judge Advocate of the Fleet. He was knighted on 23 February 1860, and promoted to Attorney General on 9 July 1861.

Having taken an office of profit under the Crown, he was obliged on each occasion to present himself for re-election, and was returned unopposed at by-elections on 9 January 1860 and 8 July 1861. In his acceptance speech in July 1861 he called for greater unity in the Liberal Party, and supported British neutrality in the American Civil War.

Atherton retired as Attorney General in the autumn of 1863 due to ill-health.

He died on 22 January 1864, at his home in Westbourne Terrace, near Hyde Park in London.

== Family ==
In 1843 he married Agnes Mary Hall Stand (died 1866), daughter of Thomas J. Hall, the chief magistrate of Bow Street Magistrates' Court. When knighted, she became Lady Agnes Atherton.

He was the father of 8 children.

Walter H. Atherton, his eldest son, was born on 15 January 1855 and christened at St Pancras, Middlesex. Educated at Charterhouse and commissioned Lieutenant in the 5th Dragoon Guards on 2 December 1874, becoming Captain on 27 August 1879. He was attached to the 4th Dragoon Guards in Egypt 1882 and was present at the battle of Tel-El-Kebir on 13 September 1882. Promoted to Major on 16 April 1884, he commanded the 5th Dragoon Guards detachment of 31 men at the battle of Abu Klea on 17 January 1885, during which action he was killed. Of the nine British officers killed in action at Abu Klea.

His other son, Thomas James Atherton was born on 19 August 1856, and was also educated at Charterhouse. Thomas entered the 12th Lancers in 1880, and succeeded to the command of the regiment in South Africa, during the Boer War, after the death in action of Lieutenant-Colonel The Earl of Airlie. He was created a Companion of the Bath on 27 September 1901, and mentioned in Lord Roberts’ despatch of 29 November 1900, the London Gazette 10 September 1901. During the Great War he served in the rank of Colonel with the Reserve Regiment of Cavalry and with the Labour Corps in France. He was twice mentioned in despatches, London Gazette 4 January and 11 December 1917, and created a Companion of the Order of St Michael and St George, London Gazette 1 January 1918. He was also subject to a public scandal and divorced his wife, Mabel Louisa Dean Paul, who was very much part of London High Society.

Parliament of the United Kingdom
Preceded by Henry Spearman; Thomas Colpitts Granger	Member of Parliament for City of Durham; 1852 – 1864; With: Thomas Colpitts Granger to Dec 1852; Lord Adolphus Vane Dec 1852–1853; John Mowbray from 1853	Succeeded by John Henderson; John Mowbray
Legal offices
Preceded by Thomas Phinn	Judge Advocate of the Fleet; 1855 – 1859	Succeeded by Robert Collier
Preceded by Henry Singer Keating	Solicitor General for England and Wales; 1859 – 1861	Succeeded by Sir Roundell Palmer
Preceded by Sir Richard Bethell	Attorney General for England and Wales; 1861 – 1863	Succeeded by Sir Roundell Palmer
