= Gordon McKeag =

- Born: 1928; Whickham, England
- Died: 29 September 2005 (aged 76–77)
- Occupation: Solicitor
- Known for: Former chairman of Newcastle United
- Title: Consul of Iceland
- Spouse: Tessa McKeag
- Parent: William McKeag (father)

Gordon McKeag (1928 – 29 September 2005) was an English solicitor and former chairman of Newcastle United.

== Biography ==
McKeag was born in Whickham and attended Durham and Cambridge University. He followed in his father's footsteps to become a solicitor.

McKeag was first appointed to the board of Newcastle United in November 1972 on the death of his father, Alderman William McKeag. In June 1988 he took on the top job as chairman at the club while he was in recovery from a quintuple heart bypass. He led the club through a difficult period when it was relegated to the old Second Division. During that time, he fought off takeover bids from Sir John Hall. He stepped down from the job after a club share issue failed to gain support in December 1990.

McKeag continued to be involved in a number of high-profile organisations. He was president of the Football League, chairman of the FA Challenge Cup Committee, director of the Football Association and director of the Football League and PFA Administration. He was also president of the Jesmond Lawn Tennis Club where he was a member for more than thirty years.

His passion for football never waned and a week before his death he was in his usual seat in the Milburn Stand at the last home game to watch Newcastle beat Manchester City at St James' Park.
