= Arthur Hill-Trevor, 3rd Viscount Dungannon =

English Conservative Party politician

Arthur Hill-Trevor, 3rd Viscount Dungannon (9 November 1798 – 11 August 1862), of Whittlebury, Northamptonshire, was an English Conservative Party politician for New Romney and the City of Durham.

== Early life ==
Hill-Trevor was born in Berkeley Square, London, on 9 November 1798 and was the only surviving son of Arthur Hill-Trevor, second viscount (1763–1837), by Charlotte, third daughter of Charles FitzRoy, first Baron Southampton. His younger brother, Charles Henry, died on 18 September 1823 after falling during the Stapleton Park races. Hill-Trevor attended Harrow School and matriculated at Christ Church, Oxford on 17 October 1817. He received his B.A. in 1820 and his M.A. in 1825.

He succeeded his father as the third viscount Dungannon in 1837.

== Career ==
He became a Member of Parliament (MP) for the constituency of New Romney in 1830, a position that he held until 11 March 1831. He was then elected MP of the City of Durham in between 1831 and 1832, 1835 and 1841, and 5 April 1843 and 14 July 1843. He was an opponent of the reform bills of 1831–2, which would become the Reform Act 1832, and wrote a pamphlet in opposition titled Letter to the Duke of Rutland.

In September 1855, he was elected an Irish representative peer and was actively involved in the House of Lords. He led the opposition to the Divorce Bill 1857 and Lord Wodehouse's Marriage Law Amendment (Deceased Wife's Sister) Bill 1859.

== Personal life ==
On 10 September 1821, he married Sophia, daughter of Colonel Gorges Marcus Irvine of Castle Irvine, County Fermanagh. Hill-Trevor died at his home in London, on 11 August 1862. As he had no male children, the peerage became extinct after his death. Edwin Hill-Trevor inherited his estate.

Hill-Trevor, along with publishing several pamphlets, wrote The Life and Times of William III.

Parliament of the United Kingdom
Preceded by George Hay Dawkins-Pennant; William Miles	Member of Parliament for New Romney; 1830–1831; With: William Miles	Succeeded by William Miles; Sir Roger Gresley
Preceded by William Chaytor; William Charles Harland	Member of Parliament for City of Durham; 1835–1841; With: William Charles Harland	Succeeded by Robert FitzRoy; Thomas Colpitts Granger
Preceded by Thomas Colpitts Granger; Robert FitzRoy	Member of Parliament for City of Durham; April 1843 – July 1843; With: Thomas Colpitts Granger	Succeeded by John Bright; Thomas Colpitts Granger
Peerage of Ireland
Preceded by Arthur Hill-Trevor	Viscount Dungannon; 1837–1862	Extinct
