= Thomas Gibson (artist) =

English painter and copyist (1680–1751)

Thomas Gibson (c. 1680 – 28 April 1751) was an English painter and copyist who specialised in portrait painting. He was born and died in London.

== Life ==
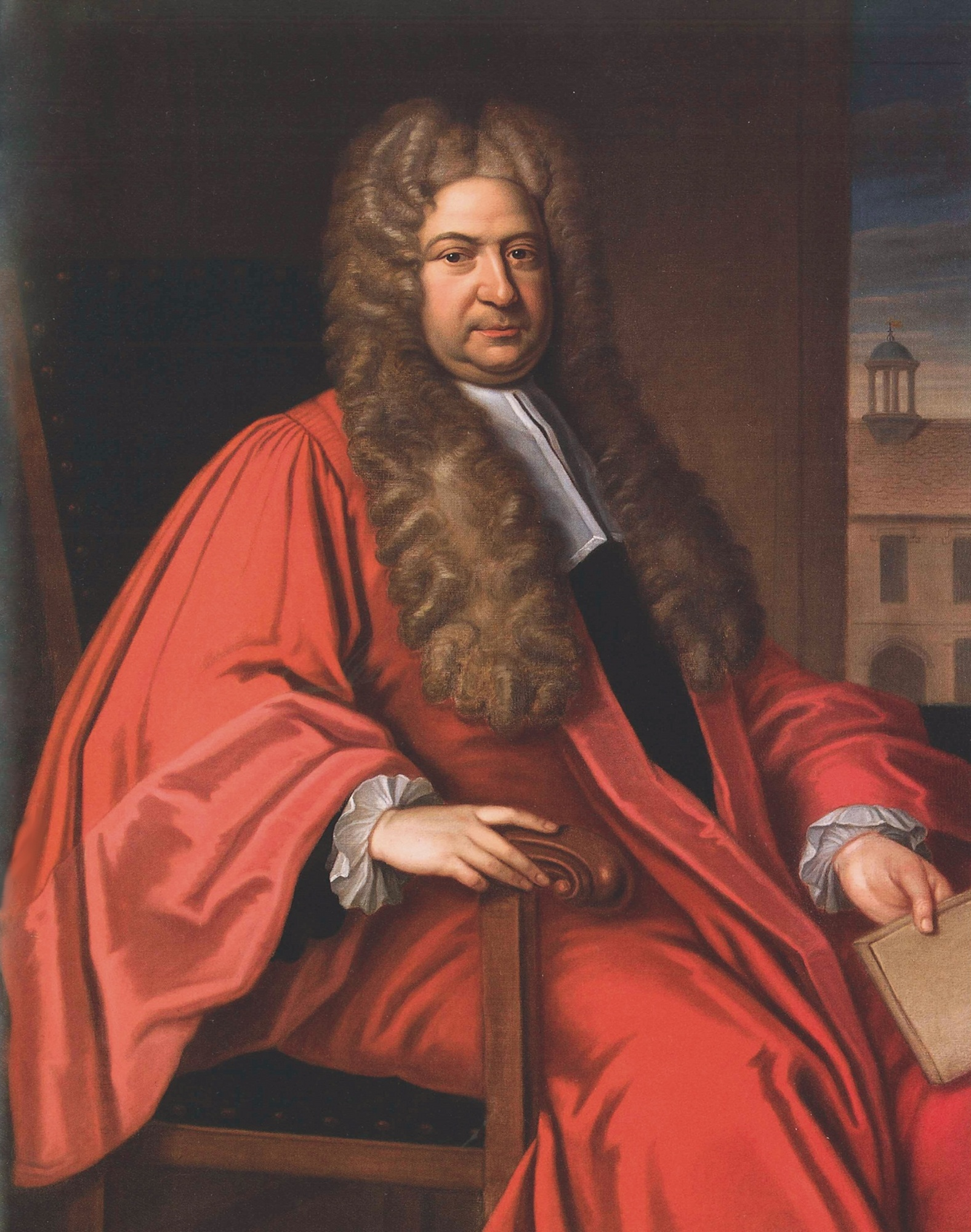
c. 1745 portrait of Nathaniel Lloyd by Gibson

Nothing known of Gibson's life before c. 1711, when he was already established as portrait painter, appointed a founding director of Godfrey Kneller's Academy in London at Great Queen Street. According to the painter Thomas Highmore, Sir James Thornhill applied to Gibson to sketch for him in his large pictures figures in action. among his pupils there was George Vertue. Gibson's sitters included a number of important public figures: Dr Henry Sacheverell (1710; Oxford, Magdalen Coll.), John Flamsteed (1712; Oxford, Bodleian Lib.), Sir Robert Walpole (untraced; engr. G. Bockman), Archbishop William Wake (Oxford, Christ Church Pict. Gal.) and Archbishop John Potter (London, Lambeth Pal.). His most constant patron was John Poulett, 1st Earl Poulett (1663–1743), who commissioned a great number of originals and copies.

Gibson's career was interrupted in 1729–31 by serious illness, and he was obliged to sell his collection and for a time retire to Oxford. After resuming his practice he was patronized by Augusta, Princess of Wales, who in 1742 commissioned a group portrait of her four children, as well as her own portrait (both British Royal Col.).

== Sources ==
- Bénézit, Emmanuel (2006) [first published in French in 1911–1923]. Benezit Dictionary of Artists. Vol. 6. Paris: Gründ. p. 148. ISBN 2-7000-3076-1 – via the Internet Archive.
- Cust, Lionel Henry; Herring, Sarah (2004). "Gibson, Thomas". Oxford Dictionary of National Biography. Vol. 22. Oxford, New York: Oxford University Press. pp. 97–98. ISBN 0-19-861372-5. OCLC 1035755389 – via Internet Archive.
- Einberg, Elizabeth (1987). Manners & Morals: Hogarth and British Painting 1700-1760 (exhibition catalogue). London: Tate Gallery. 30–31, cat. no. 1. ISBN 0-946590-84-2. OCLC 1150291569 – via Internet Archive.
- Jeffree, Richard (1996). "Gibson, Thomas". In Turner, Jane (ed.). The Dictionary of Art. Vol. 12. New York: Grove's Dictionaries. p. 600. ISBN 1-884446-00-0 – via Internet Archive.
