= John Lloyd Wharton =

British politician

The Right Honourable John Lloyd Wharton

Member of Parliament for City of Durham
- In office 28 Apr 1871 – 5 February 1874
- Preceded by: John Robert Davison
- Succeeded by: Thomas Charles Thompson

Member of Parliament for Ripon
- In office 10 Jul 1886 – 26 Jan 1906
- Preceded by: William Harker
- Succeeded by: Henry Finnis Blosse Lynch

Personal details
- Born: 18 April 1837 Aberford, West Riding of Yorkshire
- Died: 11 July 1912 (aged 75) Bramham cum Oglethorpe, West Riding of Yorkshire
- Party: Conservative and Unionist Party
- Spouse: Susan Frances Duncombe Shafto
- Profession: Barrister

John Lloyd Wharton PC (18 April 1837 – 11 July 1912) was a Barrister and a Conservative Party politician. He was the Member of Parliament (MP) for Durham then MP for Ripon.

== Early life ==
Wharton was born at Aberford in the West Riding of Yorkshire on 18 April 1837. He was the only son of John Thomas Wharton and Mary Jacob, daughter of Rev. John Henry Jacob. His uncle was William Lloyd Wharton, a barrister and chairman of the North Eastern Railway. In 1861, his uncle died and Wharton inherited his Windy Hill estate, which would become Wharton Park.

Wharton was educated at Eton College and Trinity College, Cambridge, where he received his B.A. in 1859. He was admitted to the Inner Temple on 14 April 1959 and was called to the bar on 27 January 1862. He later received an honorary D.C.L. from Durham University in 1887.

== Political career ==
He stood as a Member of Parliament for the City of Durham in the 1868 general election but failed to get elected. In May 1871 in a by-election caused by the death of the Member of Parliament John Robert Davison, Wharton, a Unionist candidate, beat the Liberal candidate with a majority of 34 to be elected as one of the Members of Parliament for City of Durham. He lost the seat to the Liberal candidate Thomas Charles Thompson in the 1874 general election. He stood again as a candidate in 1880 general election but failed to get elected.

He stood as a candidate for Ripon in the 1885 general election but failed to get elected when he lost by 165 votes to William Harker who was a strong local candidate. In 1886, he stood again for Ripon in the 1886 general election and was elected with a majority of 988. He was then the Member of Parliament for Ripon for 20 years until he was defeated at the 1906 general election by Henry Finnis Blosse Lynch with a majority of 313. He became a Privy Councillor in 1897 and in December 1901 he was appointed a Knight of Grace of the Order of St John.

From 1871 to 1906 he was chairman of the Durham Quarter Sessions. He also served as the first chairman of Durham County Council when it was established in 1889.

== Personal life ==
Wharton married Susan Frances Duncombe Shafto on 20 January 1870 but she died in 1872. The couple had a daughter Mary Dorothea in 1870. In 1894 she married Charles Waring Darwin; she had three sons including Charles John Wharton Darwin.

He served as the first president of the Durham Amateur Rowing Club, from 1860 to 1894.

In the 1911 Census of Wetherby he described himself as a 73-year-old widower and a Justice of the Peace for Yorkshire and Durham and a director of the North Eastern Railway.

Wharton died on 11 July 1912.

Parliament of the United Kingdom
Preceded by John Robert Davison	Member of Parliament for City of Durham; 1871 – 1874	Succeeded by Thomas Charles Thompson
Preceded by William Harker	Member of Parliament for Ripon; 1886 – 1906	Succeeded by H. F. B. Lynch
Business positions
Preceded by Sir Edward Grey, Bart	Chairman of the North Eastern Railway; 1906–1912	Succeeded by Baron Knaresborough
