= Sir Nicholas Cole, 1st Baronet =

Sir Nicholas Cole, 1st Baronet (died 1660) was an English Royalist during the English Civil War.

Cole was the son of Ralph Cole, who had purchased Brancepeth Castle in 1633. On 4 March 1640 Cole was created a baronet, of Brancepeth in the Baronetage of England by Charles I. He served as Mayor of Newcastle upon Tyne in 1640 and 1641 and played a prominent role in the defence of the city during the seven-month Siege of Newcastle in 1644. Under the Commonwealth of England he lived in obscurity. He was succeeded in his title by his son, Ralph Cole.

Baronetage of England
| New creation | Baronet (of Brancepeth); 1640–1660 | Succeeded by Ralph Cole |
