= Mark Hughes (politician) =

Labour politician & historian

William Mark Hughes (18 December 1932 – 19 March 1993) was a British Labour Party politician and an economic historian.

Hughes was member of parliament for Durham from 1970 to 1983, and the (slightly renamed) City of Durham from 1983 to 1987, when he stood down. From 1975 to 1979, he was also appointed a Member of the European Parliament as part of the Labour delegation.

Hughes grew up in Durham, where his father was Professor of History. He attended Durham School then won a scholarship to Balliol College, Oxford, graduating in 1956. He followed this with a PhD at King's College, Durham (now Newcastle University) in 1958, where he remained as the Sir James Knott Research Fellow until 1960. He worked as a staff tutor in the extramural studies department of Manchester University from 1960 until 1964, when he moved to a lecturing position at Durham University that he held until he entered parliament. He died in Aberystwyth in 1993.

Parliament of the United Kingdom
Preceded by Charles Grey	Member of Parliament for City of Durham; 1970 – 1987	Succeeded by Gerry Steinberg
