= Mary Kelly Foy =

British politician (born 1968)

Mary Kelly Foy MP
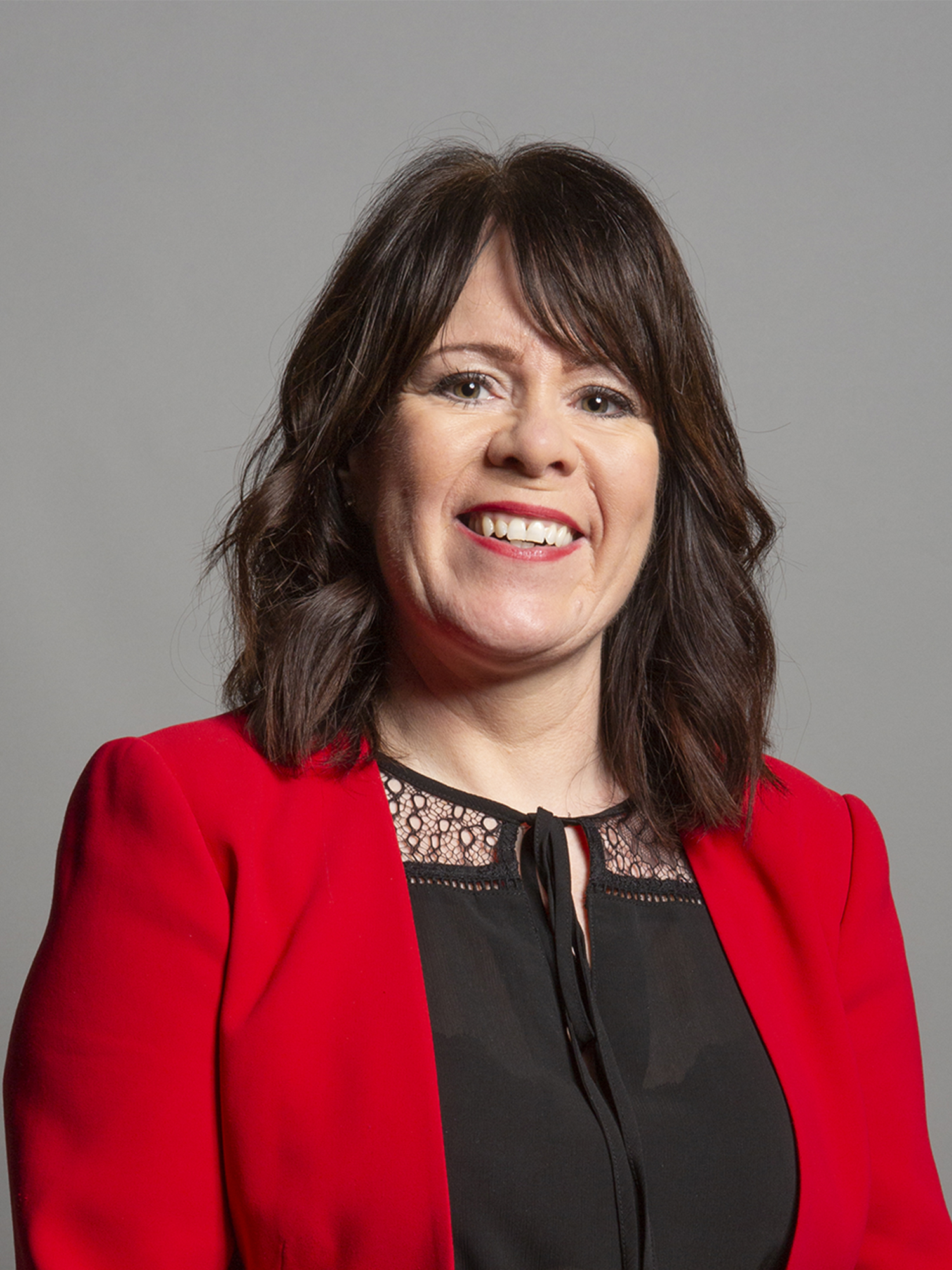
- Official portrait, 2019

Member of Parliament for the City of Durham
- Incumbent
- Assumed office 12 December 2019
- Preceded by: Roberta Blackman-Woods
- Majority: 11,757 (28.9%)

Personal details
- Born: Mary Kelly McStea; 27 February 1968 (age 58) Jarrow, County Durham, England
- Party: Labour
- Other political affiliations: Socialist Campaign Group
- Website: maryfoy.org.uk

Mary Kelly Foy (née McStea; born 27 February 1968) is a British Labour Party politician serving as the Member of Parliament (MP) for the City of Durham since the 2019 general election. She is a member of the Socialist Campaign Group parliamentary caucus.

== Early life and education ==
Foy was born in Jarrow, County Durham, and grew up on a council estate. She is the second of five children and her grandparents were Irish immigrants. Her father is a former shipyard worker who lost his job in the 1980s under Margaret Thatcher's premiership. Foy has a degree in social sciences, which she gained as a mature student.

== Career ==
Foy is a member of both UNISON and Unite the Union. She was a Community Development Worker in Durham from 2006 to 2013, and she also worked as a parliamentary assistant to former Jarrow MP Stephen Hepburn.

She was elected as a local Councillor to represent the Lamesley ward (named after the area of the same name on Gateshead Council Metropolitan Borough Council in 2006. She later became the cabinet member for health and wellbeing on the council in 2009, holding the post until she stood down from the council in 2019. She was local party chair for Blaydon before moving to the City of Durham, and a regional representative of Labour's National Policy Forum.

A socialist and on the left of the party, Foy's bid was backed by several unions. She stood down from Gateshead Council when elected as an MP for City of Durham in 2019, and joined the Socialist Campaign Group parliamentary group.

== Parliamentary career ==
On 15 October 2020, Foy resigned as Parliamentary Private Secretary to Andy McDonald to vote against the proposed Covert Human Intelligence Sources (Criminal Conduct) Bill, disagreeing with the Labour whip to abstain.

In November 2020, Foy was involved in the saving of a local school, St Thomas More Primary School, Belmont. Foy had met with representatives of the diocese and the governing body, Durham County Council officers and elected officials, parents and the local community to listen to concerns and to help find a way to resolve the situation.

Foy was part of the Committee which scrutinised the Health and Care Bill in Parliament. As part of this committee, Foy tabled several amendments relating to smoking health, including banning a loophole which enables vapes to be handed out for free to underage people and raising the age of sale of cigarettes to 21.

Foy held her seat in the 2024 general election, with 47.1% of the vote and a majority of 11,757 over the second-placed Reform UK candidate. There were six candidates, and a turnout of 58%.

Parliament of the United Kingdom
Preceded by Roberta Blackman-Woods	Member of Parliament for the City of Durham; 2019–present	Incumbent
