= Joshua Ritson =

British Labour politician

Joshua Ritson CBE MP (16 June 1874 in Farlam – 5 February 1955 in Sunderland) was a British Labour politician who served as member of parliament (MP) for the City of Durham. He was elected in 1922, unseated in 1931, and re-elected in 1935 and remained in Parliament until 1945. He is known for his representation of the Durham miners. He became mayor of Sunderland in 1945, and was appointed the C.B.E. Order of the British Empire in 1949. In 1951 he was made Roll of Honorary Freeman of the former Borough of Sunderland.

== Quotes ==
"The day has passed when we had to take off our hats to the squire and bow to the bishop"

== Personal ==
Born in 1874, he was the son of Joshua Ritson from Bampton, Cumberland and his wife Ann. His older brother John Ritson was President of the Northern Colliery Officials Association. In 1900, he married Elizabeth, the daughter of Irvin Dinning. His great-niece is Labour Party politician Baroness Joyce Quin.

== See also ==
- List of MPs elected in the United Kingdom general election of: 1922, 1923, 1924, 1929 and 1935

Parliament of the United Kingdom
Preceded by John Hills	Member of Parliament for City of Durham; 1922 – 1931	Succeeded by William McKeag
Preceded by William McKeag	Member of Parliament for City of Durham; 1935 – 1945	Succeeded by Charles Grey
Civic offices
Preceded by John Young	Mayor of Sunderland; 1945-1946	Succeeded by Miles Walton
