= April 1871 Durham City by-election =

UK parliamentary by-election

The 1871 Durham City by-election was fought on 28 April 1871. The by-election was fought due to the death of the incumbent MP of the Liberal Party, John Robert Davison. It was won by the Conservative candidate John Lloyd Wharton.

It was the second by-election of the year, as Davison had been required to seek re-election following his appointment as Judge Advocate General. The first by-election had been held on 14 January, in which Davison had been re-elected unopposed.
