= Roberta Blackman-Woods =

British Labour politician (born 1957)

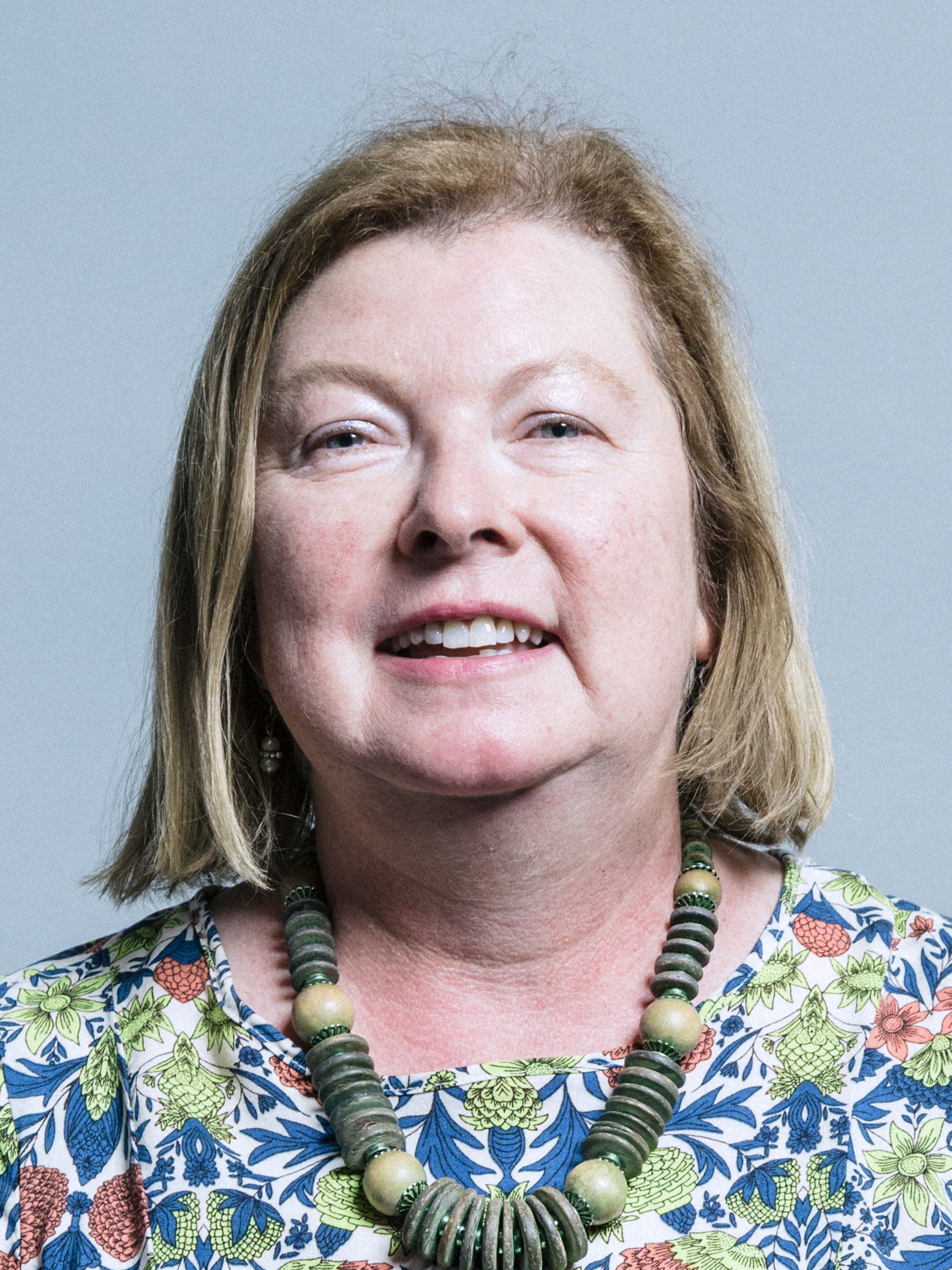

Shadow Minister for Planning
- In office 12 January 2018 – 6 November 2019
- Leader: Jeremy Corbyn
- Preceded by: Position established
- Succeeded by: Position abolished

Shadow Minister for International Development
- In office 3 July 2017 – 12 January 2018
- Leader: Jeremy Corbyn
- Preceded by: Imran Hussain
- Succeeded by: Dan Carden; Preet Gill

Shadow Minister for Housing
- In office 18 September 2015 – 3 July 2017
- Leader: Jeremy Corbyn
- Preceded by: Position established
- Succeeded by: Melanie Onn

Shadow Minister for Communities and Local Government
- In office 7 October 2011 – 18 September 2015
- Leader: Ed Miliband

Shadow Minister for Civil Society
- In office 8 October 2010 – 7 October 2011
- Leader: Ed Miliband
- Preceded by: Nick Hurd (Charities, Social Enterprise and Volunteering)
- Succeeded by: Gareth Thomas

Member of Parliament for City of Durham
- In office 5 May 2005 – 6 November 2019
- Preceded by: Gerry Steinberg
- Succeeded by: Mary Foy

Personal details
- Born: Roberta Carol Woods; 16 August 1957 (age 69) Belfast, Northern Ireland
- Party: Labour
- Education: University of Ulster
- Website: Official website

Academic background
- Thesis: The state and community work in Northern Ireland 1966–1982 (1989)

Roberta Carol Blackman-Woods (née Woods; 16 August 1957) is a British academic and former Labour Party politician who was the Member of Parliament (MP) for the City of Durham from 2005 to 2019.

== Early life and career ==
Blackman-Woods is from Northern Ireland and was educated at the University of Ulster, graduating with a BSc degree and later a PhD in social science. Following this she was employed by Newcastle City Council, before going on to pursue a career in academia.

As a sociologist with expertise in housing, she served as professor of social policy and an associate dean in the School of Arts and Social Sciences at the University of Northumbria prior to her election, and had previously been dean of social and labour studies at Ruskin College, Oxford and head of policy at the Local Government Information Unit. Blackman-Woods had previously been chair of the City of Durham Constituency Labour Party and before that in Newcastle upon Tyne East and Wallsend. She has also served as a councillor on Oxford and Newcastle City Councils.

== Parliamentary career ==
In 2004, Blackman-Woods was selected as the Labour candidate for the City of Durham constituency through an All-Women Shortlist. In her previous work she had been known by her maiden name, Roberta Woods, but added her husband's surname, Blackman, after selection to avoid confusion with Liberal Democrat candidate Carol Woods.

Elected at the 2005 general election with a majority of 3,274, Blackman-Woods made her maiden speech to the House of Commons on 24 May 2005, making reference to the work of her predecessor Gerry Steinberg, the importance to Durham of Durham Cathedral, the University of Durham and the historic legacy of mining within the area.

Blackman-Woods was a member of the Joint Committee on Statutory Instruments from 2005 to 2010 and has also been a member of the Education and Skills Select committee and the Business, Innovation, Science and Skills Select Committee. In 2006 she became the Parliamentary Private Secretary to the Chancellor of the Duchy of Lancaster, Hilary Armstrong. This post lasted until Armstrong returned to the backbenches when Gordon Brown became Prime Minister, but Blackman-Woods was then appointed PPS to the Secretary of State for Defence, Des Browne, in 2007. Following Des Brown's retirement to the backbenches she served as PPS to David Lammy MP as Minister of State for Higher Education. She was also Chair of the All Party Afghanistan Group from 2005 and the All Party Balanced and Sustainable Communities Group from 2007.

Blackman-Woods was also a member of the Commonwealth Parliamentary Association and the Inter-Parliamentary Union throughout her Parliamentary career.

In 2010, she was re-elected to Parliament with a majority of 3,067, and was appointed Shadow Minister for Business in June 2010, before being moved to shadow the Civil Society Minister by new Labour Leader Ed Miliband in October 2010. In the October 2011 shadow cabinet re-shuffle, Blackman-Woods was moved to become Shadow Minister in Communities and Local Government covering planning policy and procurement.

In 2015, she was re-elected with a majority of 11,439, and was confirmed as the shadow housing minister. She resigned from the front bench in June 2016, before supporting Owen Smith in the 2016 Labour leadership election. She subsequently rejoined the front bench on Corbyn's re-election.

She was re-elected in 2017 with a majority of 12,362, and in July 2017 she was appointed as a Shadow International Development Minister.

On 16 July 2019 she announced that she would not be standing at the next general election for family reasons. She gave her valedictory speech in the House of Commons on 5 November 2019.

In 2021 it was reported that Blackman-Woods had been subject to an investigation by the Parliamentary Commissioner for Standards. The Commissioner applied no sanctions to Blackman-Woods, who stated there were "strong medical reasons" for the issues that were raised.

== Post-parliamentary career ==
Blackman-Woods was appointed as chairwoman of governors at Northumbria University in December 2019, commencing the role in August 2020.

Parliament of the United Kingdom
Preceded by Gerry Steinberg	Member of Parliament for City of Durham; 2005–2019	Succeeded by Mary Foy
Political offices
Preceded by Teresa Pearce	Shadow Secretary of State for Communities and Local Government; 2017	Succeeded by Andrew Gwynne
