= William Battine =

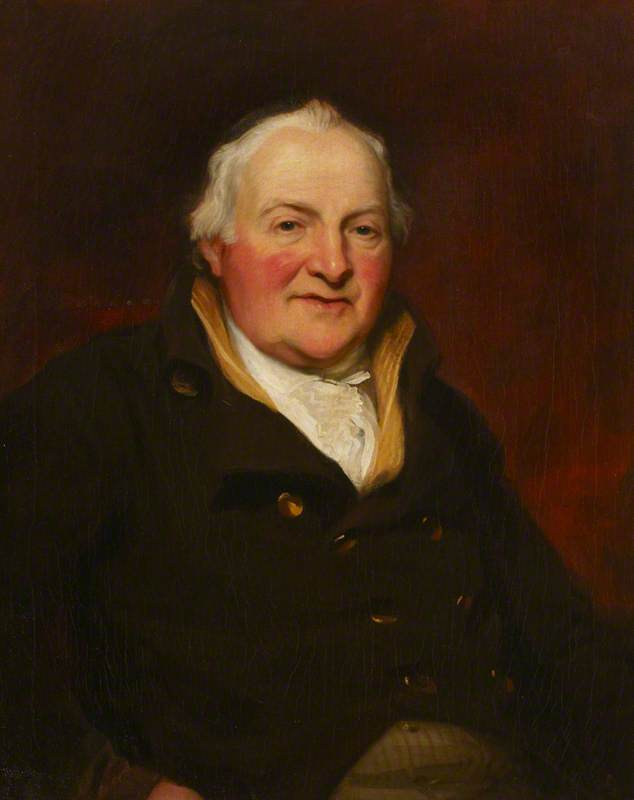

William Battine (25 January 1755 – 5 September 1836), was the English holder of many legal offices, and poet.

== Life ==
Battine was born at East Marden, Sussex on 25 January 1755 son of William and Wilhelmina. Through his mother's family, he was stated to be one of the coheirs of the long dormant barony of Bray, but he never publicly urged his claim. He was educated at Trinity College, Cambridge in 1774, but migrated to Trinity Hall, Cambridge; he took the degree of LL.B. in 1780, and that of LL.D. in 1785.

On 3 November 1785, he was admitted fellow of the College of Doctors of Law, in London, and soon secured a large practice in the ecclesiastical and admiralty courts. From the year 1812 until 1827 he was one of the gentlemen of the privy chamber in ordinary. He is said to have lived on intimate terms with the king when Prince of Wales, and was credited with having settled a quarrel between the prince and his father. For many years Battine was advocate-general in the high court of admiralty, and chancellor of the diocese of Lincoln; he held besides several other minor legal offices. He was elected a fellow of the Royal Society on 1 June 1797.

In his old age he contracted many eccentric habits, and, having squandered the wealth he had acquired in his profession, lived in great poverty. He died 5 September 1836, and was, according to his own directions, buried five days later with great privacy in the church of St. George the Martyr, Southwark.

Battine published, in 1822, a dramatic poem, entitled 'Another Cain: a Mystery.' It was written, its author tells us, 'to correct the blasphemy put into the mouth of Lucifer' in Lord Byron's 'Cain.' An undated 'Letter to the Judges of the King's Bench,’ in pamphlet form, was also published by Battine. It urges that gentlemen of the privy chamber are exempt by privilege from arrest in civil suits, an indignity to which Battine had himself apparently been subjected.
