= John Robert Davison =

English barrister and Liberal politician

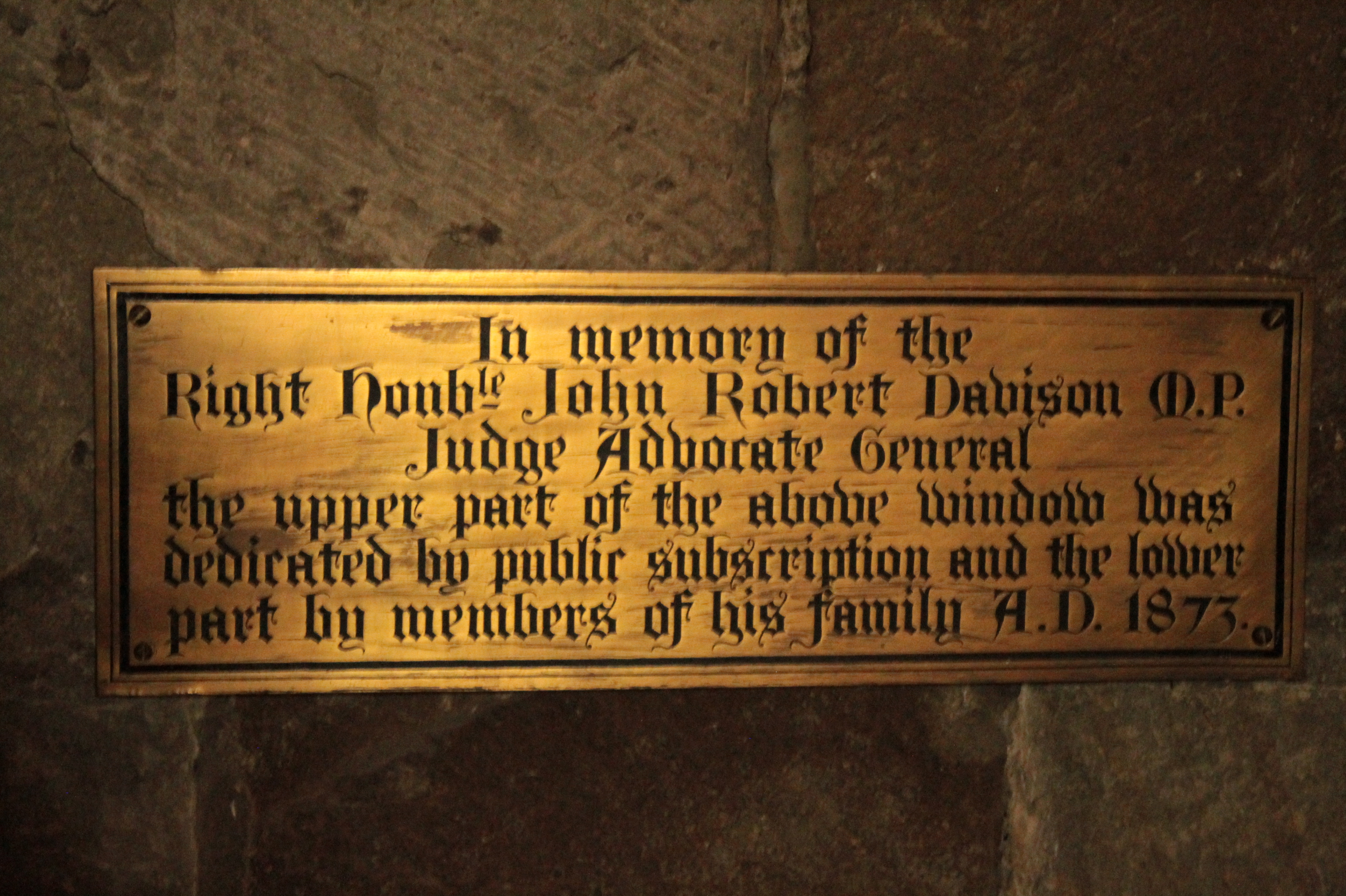
Plaque to John Robert Davison, Durham Cathedral

The Right Honourable John Robert Davison MP, QC (7 April 1825 – 15 April 1871) was an English barrister and Liberal politician who sat in the House of Commons from 1868 to 1871.

Davison was the son of the Rev. Edward Davison, Rector of Harlington, Middlesex, and Vicar of St. Nicholas Church, Durham. He was educated at Durham School, and at the University of Durham, graduating with his M.A. in 1849. He was called to the bar at the Middle Temple in 1849, and went on the Northern Circuit. In 1866 he was made a Queen's Counsel. He was a J.P. and chairman of the Quarter Sessions for County Durham.

At the 1868 general election Davison was elected member of parliament for City of Durham. He was appointed Judge Advocate General on 28 December 1870 and ran unopposed in the January 1871 Durham City by-election. He held the seat until his death on 15 April 1871.

Davison married in 1860, Jane Anna Wood, daughter of Nicholas Wood of Hetton Hall, President of the Northern Institute of Mining Engineers. She died in November 1869. They had four children: Arthur Pearson, John Robert, Mary Frances, and Edith Lindsay (who married Sir Amherst Selby-Bigge).

A stained glass window in Durham Cathedral is dedicated to his memory.

Parliament of the United Kingdom
Preceded by John Mowbray; John Henderson	Member of Parliament for City of Durham; 1868 – 1871; With: John Henderson	Succeeded by John Lloyd Wharton; John Henderson
