= Thomas Bever (lawyer) =

English lawyer and legal writer

- Born: Stratfield Mortimer, Berkshire, England
- Baptised: 1725
- Died: 8 November 1791 (aged 65–66)
- Education: Oriel College, Oxford; All Souls College, Oxford

Thomas Bever (baptised 1725 – 8 November 1791) was an English lawyer and legal writer. He is known also as an antiquarian scholar and patron.

== Life ==
Bever was born at Stratfield Mortimer, Berkshire, the son of Thomas Bever and his wife Ann. He was educated at Oriel College, Oxford, where he graduated B.A. 21 April 1748. At All Souls College, where he became a Fellow, he graduated bachelor of law (B.C.L.) 3 July 1753, and doctor 5 April 1758. He was admitted to Doctors' Commons 21 November 1758. He was promoted to be judge of the Cinque Ports, and chancellor of two dioceses, Lincoln and Bangor.

Bever became Admiralty Advocate in 1788. He died at his house in Doctors' Commons on 8 November 1791, unmarried. He was buried in Stratfield Mortimer church, where there was a mural monument in the chancel to his memory.

== Legal lectures and writings ==
In 1762, Bever delivered a course of lectures on civil law at the University of Oxford. Herbert Jenner, the Regius Professor in the subject, gave them his blessing, as did the vice-chancellor. Jenner's appointment in 1753 had been political, backed by the Duke of Newcastle, and he has been regarded as ignorant of the law; he pleaded ill-health, in allowing Bever to deputise for him. Bever, on the other hand, was a follower and supporter of William Blackstone, who had been lecturing at Oxford on the English common law. The lectures, though never very popular, continued for some years. Among Oxford students who heard both Blackstone and Bever lecture, and a future judge, was William Scott.

In 1766, Bever published A Discourse on the Study of Jurisprudence, and on the Civil Law, being an Introduction to a Course of Lectures, but lacked support for the publication of his lecture series. In 1781, he brought out a volume The History of the Legal Policy of the Roman State; and of the rise, progress, and extent of the Roman Laws, which remained an unfinished work.

== Other interests ==
In 1752, Andrew Ducarel took a holiday in Normandy with Bever as a companion. It resulted in Ducarel's book A Tour through Normandy (1754). In the mid-1750s, Bever was cataloguing the Codrington Library at All Souls College.

Bever was a bibliophile already as a young man. He took an interest in music and the fine arts: Sherwin the engraver received Bever's patronage; and the copying of the religious music of Orlando di Lasso had his support, a project carried out by Robert Didsbury in 1785. Bever composed an oratorio, Hercules, and was a friend of Charles Burney.

== Legacy ==
Bever left legal manuscripts to John Loveday the younger, and musical manuscripts to the singer John Hindle. His will shows other bequests, such as a harpsichord and music by Handel to James Bartleman. A large music library, which was soon broken up, included English composers, with a substantial collection of manuscripts by Henry Purcell, and music by Phocion Henley that Bever himself had copied.

== Notes ==
Attribution

This article incorporates text from a publication now in the public domain: Stephen, Leslie, ed. (1885). "Bever, Thomas". Dictionary of National Biography. Vol. 4. London: Smith, Elder & Co.
