= Thomas Colpitts Granger =

British politician and barrister

Member of Parliament for City of Durham
- In office 29 June 1841 – 13 August 1852 Serving with William Atherton (July 1852–August 1852); Henry John Spearman (1847–July 1852); John Bright (July 1843–1847); Arthur Hill-Trevor (April 1843–July 1843); Robert FitzRoy (1841–April 1843)
- Preceded by: Arthur Hill-Trevor; William Charles Harland
- Succeeded by: Adolphus Vane-Tempest; William Atherton

Personal details
- Born: 1802
- Died: 13 August 1852 (aged 49–50)
- Party: Radical

Thomas Colpitts Granger, QC (1802 – 13 August 1852) was a British Radical politician and barrister.

Admitted to Inner Temple in 1830, Granger was later elected Radical MP for City of Durham at the 1841 general election and held the seat until his death in 1852.

His son, also Sir Thomas Colpitts Granger, was a County Court judge.

Parliament of the United Kingdom
Preceded by Arthur Hill-Trevor; William Charles Harland	Member of Parliament for City of Durham; 1841–1852; With: William Atherton (July 1852–August 1852); Henry John Spearman (1847–July 1852); John Bright (July 1843–1847); Arthur Hill-Trevor (April 1843–July 1843); Robert FitzRoy (1841–April 1843)	Succeeded by Adolphus Vane-Tempest; William Atherton
