= Richard Lloyd (Durham MP) =

English jurist and politician

Sir Richard Lloyd (1634–1686) was an English jurist and politician. He was Admiralty Advocate from 1674 to 1686, and appointed Judge of the High Court of Admiralty from 1685 to 1686.

== Life ==
He was the second son of Andrew Lloyd of Aston, Shropshire. (Note: There are at least seven places in Shropshire called Aston, and the source does not say which this one was. However, there are records of a Lloyd family at Aston Hall, Oswestry.) A fellow of All Souls' College, Oxford, he proceeded B.C.L. in 1659 and D.C.L. in 1662. He was admitted to Gray's Inn at 1655, and an advocate at Doctors' Commons in 1664.

He was admiralty Advocate in 1674–1685, and chancellor of the dioceses of Llandaff and Durham. He was M.P. for Durham city in 1679–1681, 1681 and 1685, and was knighted on 16 January 1677. He was dean of the arches in 1684–6, and a judge of the high court of admiralty in 1685–6.

He died 28 June 1686, and was buried in the church of St. Bennet, Paul's Wharf. Nathaniel Lloyd was his son by Elizabeth, his wife.
