= William Tempest (politician) =

William Tempest (31 January 1653 – 16 March 1700) was a Member of Parliament and a member of the Tempest family of Old Durham. The son of John Tempest and Elizabeth, the sole heiress of John Heath, he represented the City of Durham as Member of Parliament in 1678, 1680 and 1689. He was a defeated candidate in the elections of 1675,1679 and 1688.

By 1694 was referred to as Colonel Tempest. He may have been implicated in the conspiracy of John Fenwick against William III, as he was recorded as under house arrest at his home of Old Durham on 19 March 1695.

In 1677 he married Elizabeth Sudbury, niece of the Dean of Durham. Their eldest son John Tempest (1679–1737) was elected as the Member of Parliament for the County of Durham in 1705. He was ancestor to the Vane-Tempest-Stewarts, Earls Vane and Marquesses of Londonderry.
