= Parliamentary constituencies in County Durham =

The unitary authorities of Durham and Borough of Darlington are divided into 8 parliamentary constituencies, including 2 cross-county constituencies, (Note: Blaydon and Consett and Stockton West are cross-county constituencies, being partly located in Tyne and Wear and Cleveland respectively.) all of which are county constituencies.

== Constituencies ==
† Conservative ‡ Labour ¤ Reform UK

Constituency (Note: BC denotes borough constituency, CC denotes county constituency.)	Electorate	Majority (Note: The majority is the number of votes the winning candidate receives more than their nearest rival.)	Member of Parliament	Nearest opposition	Electoral wards	Map
Bishop Auckland CC	70,745	6,672	Sam Rushworth‡	Jane MacBean†	Durham County Council: Barnard Castle East, Barnard Castle West, Bishop Auckland Town, Coundon, Crook, Evenwood, Shildon and Dene Valley, Tow Law, Weardale, West Auckland, Woodhouse Close.	
Blaydon and Consett CC (part)	70,487	11,153	Liz Twist‡	David Ayre¤	Durham County Council: Benfieldside; Burnopfield and Dipton; Consett North; Consett South; Delves Lane; Leadgate and Medomsley. Metropolitan Borough of Gateshead: Blaydon; Chopwell and Rowlands Gill; Crawcrook and Greenside; Ryton, Crookhill and Stella; Winlaton and High Spen.	
City of Durham CC	70,582	11,757	Mary Foy‡	Mark Belch¤	Durham County Council: Belmont, Brandon, Deerness, Durham South, Elvet and Gilesgate, Esh and Witton Gilbert, Framwellgate and Newton Hall, Neville's Cross, Sherburn, Willington and Hunwick.	
Darlington CC	70,763	2,298	Lola McEvoy‡	Peter Gibson†	Darlington Borough Council: Bank Top and Lascelles, Brinkburn and Faverdale, Cockerton, College, Eastbourne, Harrowgate Hill, Haughton and Springfield, Heighington and Coniscliffe, Hummersknott, Mowden, North Road, Northgate, Park East, Park West, Pierremont, Red Hall and Lingfield, Stephenson, Whinfield.	
Easington CC	69,411	6,542	Grahame Morris‡	Lynn Murphy¤	Durham County Council: Blackhalls, Dawdon, Deneside, Easington, Horden, Murton, Passfield, Peterlee East, Peterlee West, Seaham, Shotton and South Hetton, Trimdon and Thornley (polling districts DKC, EEA, SNA, SNB and SNC), Wingate.	
Newton Aycliffe and Spennymoor CC	72,224	8,839	Alan Strickland‡	John Grant¤	Durham County Council: Aycliffe East, Aycliffe North and Middridge, Aycliffe West, Bishop Middleham and Cornforth, Chilton, Coxhoe, Ferryhill, Sedgefield, Spennymoor, Trimdon and Thornley (polling districts SKB, SLA, SLB, SMB and SMC), Tudhoe.	
North Durham CC	73,235	5,873	Luke Akehurst‡	Andrew Husband¤	Durham County Council: Annfield Plain, Chester-le-Street East, Chester-le-Street North, Chester-le-Street South, Chester-le-Street West Central, Craghead and South Moor, Lanchester, Lumley, North Lodge, Pelton, Sacriston, Stanley, Tanfield.	
Stockton West CC (part)	69,664	2,139	Matt Vickers†	Joe Dancey‡	Darlington Borough Council: Hurworth, Sadberge and Middleton St. George. Stockton-on-Tees Borough Council: Bishopsgarth and Elm Tree, Eaglescliffe, Fairfield, Grangefield, Hartburn, Ingleby Barwick East, Ingleby Barwick West, Village, Western Parishes, Yarm.	

== Boundary changes ==
=== 2024 ===
See 2023 Periodic Review of Westminster constituencies for further details.

Former name
1. Bishop Auckland CC
2. City of Durham CC
3. Darlington BC
4. Easington CC
5. North Durham CC
6. North West Durham CC
7. Sedgefield CC
Boundaries 2010–2024

Parliamentary constituencies in Durham (2010–2024)

Current name
1. Bishop Auckland CC
2. Blaydon and Consett CC
3. City of Durham CC
4. Darlington CC
5. Easington CC
6. Newton Aycliffe and Spennymoor CC
7. North Durham CC
8. Stockton West CC
Boundaries 2024–present

Parliamentary constituencies in Durham (2024–present)

For the 2023 Periodic Review of Westminster constituencies, which redrew the constituency map ahead of the 2024 United Kingdom general election, the Boundary Commission for England opted to combine the unitary authority of County Durham with the Tyne and Wear boroughs of Gateshead, South Tyneside and Sunderland as a sub-region of the North East Region, with the creation of a cross-county boundary constituency named Blaydon and Consett, resulting in the abolition of North West Durham. The reconfigured Sedgefield constituency was renamed Newton Aycliffe and Spennymoor. The Borough of Darlington was included in a Tees Valley sub-division.

The following seats resulted from the boundary review:

Containing electoral wards in Darlington

- Darlington
- Stockton West (part also in Stockton-on-Tees)

Containing electoral wards in County Durham

- Bishop Auckland
- Blaydon and Consett (part also in Gateshead in Tyne and Wear)
- City of Durham
- Easington
- Newton Aycliffe and Spennymoor
- North Durham

=== 2010 ===
Under the Fifth Periodic Review of Westminster constituencies, the Boundary Commission for England decided to retain Durham's constituencies for the 2010 election, making minor changes to realign constituency boundaries with the boundaries of current local government wards.

Name
1. Bishop Auckland CC
2. City of Durham CC
3. Darlington BC
4. Easington CC
5. North Durham CC
6. North West Durham CC
7. Sedgefield CC
Boundaries 1997–2010

Parliamentary constituencies in Durham (1997–2010)

Boundaries 2010–2024

Parliamentary constituencies in Durham (2010–2024)

== Results history ==
Primary data source: House of Commons research briefing – General election results from 1918 to 2019

=== 2024 ===
The number of votes cast for each political party who fielded candidates in constituencies comprising Durham in the 2024 general election were as follows:

Party	Votes	%	Change from 2019	Seats	Change from 2019
Labour	104,518	43.7%	▲3.3%	6	▲3
Reform	54,168	22.6%	▲14.2%	0	0
Conservative	48,348	20.2%	▼20.4	0	▼4
Liberal Democrats	15,538	6.5%	▼0.5%	0	0
Greens	12,747	5.3%	▲2.3%	0	0
Others	3,848	1.6%	0	0	0
Total	239,167	100.0		6	

=== 2019 ===
The number of votes cast for each political party who fielded candidates in constituencies comprising Durham in the 2019 general election were as follows:

Party	Votes	%	Change from 2017	Seats	Change from 2017
Conservative	123,112	40.6%	▲5.3%	4	▲4
Labour	122,547	40.4%	▼14.2%	3	▼4
Brexit	25,444	8.4%	new	0	0
Liberal Democrats	21,356	7.0%	▲2.5%	0	0
Greens	5,985	2.0%	▲1.0%	0	0
Others	4,725	1.6%	▼3.0%	0	0
Total	303,169	100.0		7	

=== Percentage votes ===
Election year	1983	1987	1992	1997	2001	2005	2010	2015	2017	2019	2024
Labour	45.5	52.0	57.1	68.5	62.7	56.3	45.3	48.5	54.6	40.4	43.7
Reform UK^{1}	–	–	–	–	–	–	–	–	–	8.4	22.6
Conservative	30.4	28.3	28.4	17.6	20.6	16.6	21.4	25.4	35.3	40.6	20.2
Liberal Democrat^{2}	23.9	19.7	14.2	9.7	14.2	21.3	24.1	6.0	4.5	7.0	6.5
Green Party	–	*	*	*	*	*	–	3.7	1.0	2.0	5.3
UKIP	–	–	–	*	*	*	3.1	15.7	3.4	*	*
Other	0.1	–	0.3	4.2	2.5	5.8	6.2	0.7	1.2	1.6	1.6

^{1}As the Brexit Party in 2019 ^{2}1983 & 1987 – SDP–Liberal Alliance

* Included in Other

=== Seats ===
Election year	1983	1987	1992	1997	2001	2005	2010	2015	2017	2019	2024
Conservative	1	1	0	0	0	0	0	0	0	4	0
Labour	6	6	7	7	7	7	7	7	7	3	6
Total	7	7	7	7	7	7	7	7	7	7	6

=== Maps ===
==== 1885–1910 ====
1885

1886

1892

1895

1900

1906

Jan 1910

Dec 1910

==== 1918–1945 ====
1918

1922

1923

1924

1929

1931

1935

1945

==== 1950–1979 ====
1950

1951

1955

1959

1964

1966

1970

Feb 1974

Oct 1974

1979

==== 1983–2024 ====
1983

1987

1992

1997

2001

2005

2010

2015

2017

2019

==== 2024–present (including constituencies partly in Cleveland and Tyne and Wear) ====
2024

== Historical results by party ==
A cell marked → (with a different colour background to the preceding cell) indicates that the previous MP continued to sit under a new party name.

=== 1885 to 1906 ===
Conservative Labour Liberal Liberal-Labour Liberal Unionist

Constituency	1885	1886	88	90	91	1892	93	1895	98	1900	03	04
Barnard Castle	J. Pease										Henderson	
Bishop Auckland	Paulton											
Chester-le-Street	Joicey											
Darlington	Fry							A. Pease	H. Pease			
Durham	Milvain					Fowler			Elliot			
Durham Mid	Crawford			Wilson								
Durham North West	Atherley-Jones											
Durham South East	Havelock-Allan	Havelock-Allan				Richardson		Havelock-Allan	Richardson	Lambton		
Gateshead	James						Allan					Johnson
The Hartlepools	Richardson	Richardson			C. Furness			Richardson		C. Furness		
Houghton-le-Spring	Wilson	Wood				Fenwick		Cameron				
Jarrow	C. Palmer											
South Shields	Stevenson							Robson				
Stockton-on-Tees	Dodds		Davey			Wrightson		Samuel		Ropner		
Sunderland	Gourley									Pemberton		
Sunderland	Storey							Doxford				

=== 1906 to 1918 ===
Conservative Independent Conservative Independent Labour Labour Liberal Liberal-Labour Liberal Unionist

Constituency	1906	07	Jan 10	10	Dec 10	12	13	14	15	16	17	18
Barnard Castle	Henderson											
Bishop Auckland	Paulton		Havelock-Allan									
Chester-le-Street	Taylor		→									
Darlington	H. Pease		Lincoln		H. Pease	→						
Durham	Hills					→						
Durham Mid	Wilson								Galbraith			
Durham North West	Atherley-Jones							Williams				
Durham South East	Lambton		Hayward									
Gateshead	Johnson		Elverston									
The Hartlepools	C. Furness		S. Furness^{1}					Runciman				
Houghton-le-Spring	Cameron						Wing					
Jarrow	C. Palmer	Curran	G. Palmer									
South Shields	Robson			Rea						Cochrane		Wilson
Stockton-on-Tees	Ropner		Samuel								Watson	
Sunderland	Stuart		Storey		Greenwood							
Sunderland	Summerbell		Knott		Goldstone							

^{1}victor in January 1910, Christopher Furness, declared void. Fresh by-election held June 1910, won by Stephen Furness.

=== 1918 to 1931 ===
Coalition Liberal (1918–22) / National Liberal (1922–23) Conservative Labour Liberal National Labour

Constituency	1918	19	1922	23	1923	1924	26	29	1929	31
Barnard Castle	Swan		Rogerson		Turner-Samuels	Headlam			Lawther	
Bishop Auckland	Spoor							F. Dalton	H. Dalton	
Blaydon	Waring		Whiteley							
Chester-le-Street	Taylor	Lawson								
Consett	Williams		Dunnico							
Darlington	H. Pease			W. Pease			Shepherd			
Durham	Hills		Ritson							
Gateshead	Surtees		Brotherton		Dickie	Beckett			Melville	Evans
The Hartlepools	Gritten		Jowitt			Sugden			Gritten	
Houghton-le-Spring	Richardson									
Jarrow	Palmer		Wilson							
Seaham	Hayward		Webb						MacDonald	→
Sedgefield	Burdon		Herriotts		Ropner				Herriotts	
South Shields	Wilson		Harney						Chuter Ede	
Spennymoor	Galbraith		Batey							
Stockton-on-Tees	Watson				Stewart	Macmillan			Riley	
Sunderland	Greenwood		Thompson						Smith	Thompson
Sunderland	Hudson		Raine						Phillips	

=== 1931 to 1950 ===
Conservative Labour Independent Group (1949) / Independent Labour (1949–50) Labour Liberal National Labour National Liberal (1931–68)

Constituency	1931	1935	42	43	1945	47	49
Barnard Castle	Headlam	Sexton			Lavers		
Bishop Auckland	Curry	H. Dalton					
Blaydon	Martin	Whiteley					
Chester-le-Street	Lawson						
Consett	Dickie	Adams		Glanville			
Darlington	Peat				Hardman		
Durham	McKeag	Ritson					
Gateshead	Magnay				Zilliacus		→
The Hartlepools	Gritten			Greenwell	Jones		
Houghton-le-Spring	Chapman	Stewart			Blyton		
Jarrow	Pearson	Wilkinson				Fernyhough	
Seaham	MacDonald	Shinwell					
Sedgefield	Jennings	Leslie					
South Shields	Johnstone	Chuter Ede					
Spennymoor	Batey		Murray				
Stockton-on-Tees	Macmillan				Chetwynd		
Sunderland	Thompson	Furness			Ewart		
Sunderland	Storey jr.				Willey		

=== 1950 to 1983 ===
Conservative Labour Social Democratic

Constituency	1950	1951	53	1955	55	56	1959	62	1964	1966	1970	73	Feb 74	Oct 74	1979	1981	83
Bishop Auckland	Dalton						Boyden								Foster		
Blaydon	Whiteley					Woof									McWilliam		
Chester-le-Street	Bartley					Pentland						Radice					
Consett	Glanville			Stones						Watkins							
Darlington	Hardman	Graham					Bourne-Arton		Fletcher								O'Brien
Durham	Grey										Hughes						
Durham North West	Murray			Ainsley					E. Armstrong								
Easington	Shinwell										Dormand						
Gateshead East	Moody								Conlan								
Gateshead West	Hall				Randall						Horam					→	
The Hartlepools	Jones						Kerans		Leadbitter								
Houghton-le-Spring	Blyton								Urwin								
Jarrow	Fernyhough														Dixon		
Stockton-on-Tees	Chetwynd							Rodgers								→	
South Shields	Chuter Ede								Blenkinsop						Clark		
Sunderland North	Willey																
Sunderland South	Ewart		Williams						Bagier								
Sedgefield	Slater										Reed						

=== 1983 to 2024 ===
Conservative Labour

Constituency	1983	1987	1992	1997	2001	2005	07	2010	2015	2017	2019
Bishop Auckland	Foster					Goodman					Davison
City of Durham	Hughes	Steinberg				Blackman-Woods					Foy
Darlington	Fallon		Milburn					Chapman			Gibson
Easington	Dormand	Cummings						Morris			
North Durham	Radice				Jones						
North West Durham^{1}	E. Armstrong	H. Armstrong						Glass		Pidcock	Holden
Sedgefield	Blair						Wilson				Howell

^{1}abolished in 2024, with some areas going to the Blaydon and Consett seat which is mostly in Tyne and Wear

=== 2024 to present ===
Constituency	2024
Bishop Auckland	Rushworth
Darlington	McEvoy
City of Durham	Foy
Easington	Morris
Newton Aycliffe & Spennymoor	Strickland
North Durham	Akehurst

== See also ==
- Parliamentary constituencies in Cleveland for Hartlepool and Stockton-on-Tees from 1983.
- Parliamentary constituencies in North East England
