= 1931 Sunderland by-election =

UK Parliamentary by-election

The 1931 Sunderland by-election was held on 26 March 1931. The by-election was held due to the death of the incumbent Labour MP, Alfred Smith. Smith and his Labour colleague Dr Marion Phillips had gained the two-member seat at the last general election from the Conservatives Luke Thompson and Walter Raine, who had first won it in 1922 Another defeated candidate in 1929 was the Liberal Dr Betty Morgan, then aged 24. Both Thompson and Morgan contested the by-election.

The by-election saw Luke Thompson narrowly regain the seat he had lost in 1929 for the Conservatives. At the general election held later in the year, Thompson was returned with a greatly increased majority of over 23,000 votes, and his fellow Conservative Samuel Storey was also comfortably elected as the seat's second member.

== Previous election ==
General election 1929: Sunderland Electorate 101,875
| Party | Candidate | Votes | % | ±% |
|---|---|---|---|---|
| Labour | ✓ Marion Phillips | 31,794 | 19.5 | +0.2 |
| Labour | ✓ Alfred Smith | 31,085 | 19.0 | N/A |
| Conservative | Walter Raine | 29,180 | 17.9 | −7.4 |
| Conservative | Luke Thompson | 28,937 | 17.7 | −7.7 |
| Liberal | Betty Morgan | 21,300 | 13.0 | −4.8 |
| Liberal | John Pratt | 21,142 | 12.9 | +0.7 |
| Majority | | 1,905 | 1.1 | N/A |
| Turnout | | 163,438 | 81.1 | −3.5 |
| Labour gain from Conservative | | Swing | | |

== Result ==
1931 Sunderland by-election Electorate 103,363
| Party | Candidate | Votes | % | ±% |
|---|---|---|---|---|
| Conservative | Luke Thompson | 30,497 | 40.3 | +3.7 |
| Labour | James Thomas Brownlie | 30,074 | 39.8 | +1.3 |
| Liberal | Betty Morgan | 15,020 | 19.9 | −6.0 |
| Majority | | 423 | 0.5 | N/A |
| Turnout | | 75,591 | 73.1 | −8.0 |
| Conservative gain from Labour | | Swing | | |
