= David Barclay (MP) =

English Whig politician

Member of Parliament for Penryn
- In office 1826–1830 Serving with William Manning
- Preceded by: Robert Stanton; Pascoe Grenfell
- Succeeded by: Charles Lemon; James William Freshfield

Member of Parliament for Sunderland
- In office 1835–1837 Serving with William Thompson
- Preceded by: Sir William Chaytor, Bt; William Thompson
- Succeeded by: Andrew White; William Thompson

Member of Parliament for Sunderland
- In office 1841–1847 Serving with: William Thompson to September 1841; Viscount Howick Sept 1841–1845; George Hudson from 1845
- Preceded by: Andrew White; William Thompson
- Succeeded by: Sir Hedworth Williamson; George Hudson

Personal details
- Born: 29 September 1784 Eastwick, Surrey, England
- Died: 1 July 1861 (aged 76)
- Party: Whig
- Children: Alexander Charles Barclay

David Barclay (29 September 1784, Eastwick – 1 July 1861) was an English Whig politician who sat in the House of Commons variously between 1826 and 1847.

His father was Robert Barclay and his mother Rachel Gurney. His father was a quaker and in 1780 became a partner in Thrale's brewery in Southwark. He worked at Barclay Brothers and Company, based at 34 Old Broad Street, and was auditor to a number of concerns: the African Institution, Rock Life Assurance Office.

At the 1826 general election Barclay was elected as a Member of Parliament (MP) for Penryn in Cornwall. He held the seat until the 1830 general election, when he did not stand again in Penryn.

At the 1832 general election Barclay unsuccessfully contested the newly enfranchised borough of Sunderland. He was unsuccessful again at by-election in April 1833, but won a seat at the 1835 general election, and held it until his defeat in 1837. He was re-elected as an MP for Sunderland at the 1841 general election and held the seat until his resignation in 1847 by appointment as Steward of the Chiltern Hundreds.

Barclay married Maria Dorothea Williamson, daughter of Sir Hedworth Williamson, 7th Baronet. Their son Alexander Charles Barclay was later MP for Taunton.

Parliament of the United Kingdom
Preceded by Robert Stanton; Pascoe Grenfell	Member of Parliament for Penryn; 1826–1830; With: William Manning	Succeeded by Charles Lemon; James William Freshfield
Preceded by Sir William Chaytor, Bt; William Thompson	Member of Parliament for Sunderland; 1835–1837; With: William Thompson	Succeeded by Andrew White; William Thompson
Preceded by Andrew White; William Thompson	Member of Parliament for Sunderland; 1841–1847; With: William Thompson to September 1841; Viscount Howick Sept 1841–1845; George Hudson from 1845	Succeeded by Sir Hedworth Williamson; George Hudson
