= Samuel Storey =

Samuel Storey may refer to:

- Samuel Storey (Liberal politician) (1841–1925), British politician and newspaper proprietor, member of parliament for Sunderland
- Samuel Storey, Baron Buckton (1896–1978), his grandson, British Conservative politician, member of parliament for Sunderland, and for Stretford

== See also ==
- Sam Storey (born 1963), boxer from Northern Ireland
- Samuel Story (1752–1811), vice admiral of the Batavian Republic Navy
