= Andrew Common =

British shipping director

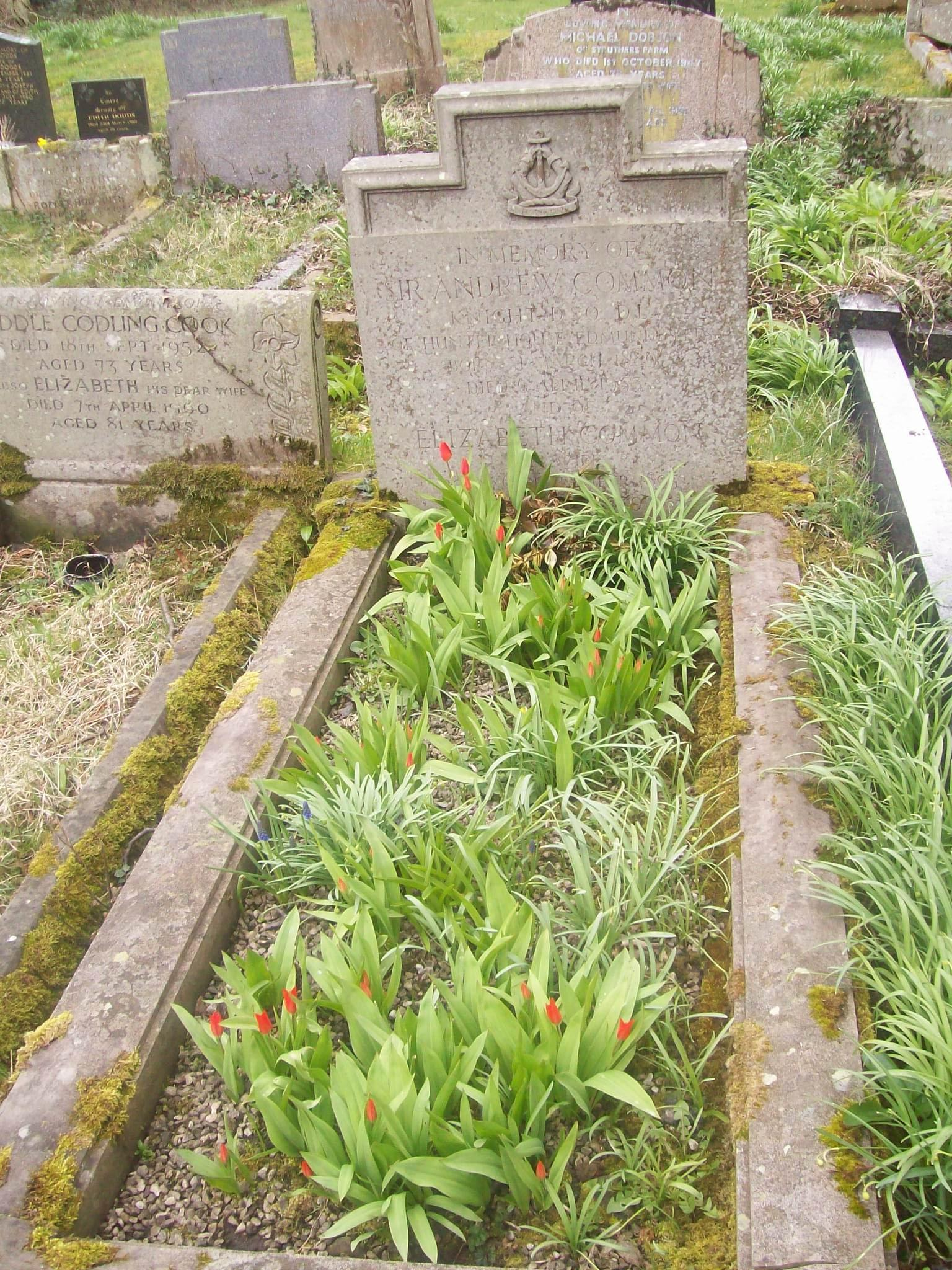
- The grave of Sir Andrew and Lady Common. Edmundbyers, County Durham, England
- Born: 31 March 1889; Sunderland, County Durham, England
- Died: 6 April 1953 (aged 64)
- Military career
- Allegiance: United Kingdom
- Rank: Second Lieutenant / Major
- Unit: 3rd Northumbrian (County of Durham) Brigade of the Royal Field Artillery
- Conflicts: World War I
- Awards: DSO
- Other work: Ministry of War Transport (World War II); Deputy Lieutenant of County Durham

Sir Lawrence Andrew Common DSO DL (31 March 1889 – 6 April 1953) was a British shipping director.

Common was born in Sunderland, County Durham, the son of Francis James Common (1847–1903), an iron merchant from Darlington, and his wife, Annie Elizabeth (née Walford) of Banbury, Oxfordshire. His aunt, Emma Jane Common, was the wife of the Nonconformist divine, Joseph Parker.

In 1911, he joined the Territorial Army as a second lieutenant in the 3rd Northumbrian (County of Durham) Brigade of the Royal Field Artillery retiring at the end of the war with the rank of Major and he was appointed a Companion of the Distinguished Service Order in 1917 for his services during World War I.

General election 1923: Sunderland
Party	Candidate	Votes	%	±%
Unionist	✓ Walter Raine	23,497	19.9	
Unionist	✓ Luke Thompson	23,379	19.8	
Liberal	Andrew Common	22,438	19.0	+7.3
Liberal	Hamar Greenwood	22,034	18.6	
Labour	David Baxter Lawley	13,707	11.6	−0.6
Labour	Tom Gillinder	13,184	11.1	−1.0
Majority		1,905	1.1	
Turnout			77.9	
Unionist hold		Swing		

In the 1945 New Year Honours, Common was appointed a knight bachelor by George VI for his work with the Ministry of War Transport during World War II and knighted at Buckingham Palace in 1945. He was also appointed a Commander of the Order of Orange-Nassau by Queen Wilhelmina of the Netherlands, for his services to her country during the war.

In 1952, Common was appointed a Deputy Lieutenant of County Durham and High Sheriff of that county in 1953, having previously been nominated in 1950 and 1952.

In 1923, Common had married Bessie Reid Pollock (1895–1959), a daughter of Gilbert Reid Pollock (1865–?), an iron engineer from Neilston, Renfrewshire, and his wife, Annie (née Blackwell) of Hyde, Cheshire. They had three children, Joyce A. (born 1924), Elizabeth A. (born 1926) and Gilbert A. (born 1930).

Common died in 1953 and was buried in Edmundbyers, County Durham, near to his home, Hunter House on the banks of Derwent Reservoir. His wife was later interred with him upon her death in 1959.

Honorary titles
Preceded by Philip Pease	High Sheriff of Durham; 1953	Succeeded by Thomas Summerson
