= Storey baronets =

Baronetcy in the Baronetage of the United Kingdom

The Storey Baronetcy, of Settrington in the County of York, is a title in the Baronetage of the United Kingdom. It was created on 30 January 1960 for the Conservative politician Samuel Storey. In 1966 he was further honoured when he was made a life peer as Baron Buckton, of Settrington in the East Riding of the County of York, in the Peerage of the United Kingdom. The life barony became extinct on his death in 1978 while he was succeeded in the baronetcy by his son, the second and (as of 2016) present holder of the title.

Samuel Storey was the grandfather of Lord Buckton.

== Storey baronets, of Settrington (1960) ==
- Sir Samuel Storey, 1st Baronet (1896–1978) (created Baron Buckton in 1966)
- Sir Richard Storey, 2nd Baronet (born 1937)

The heir apparent is the present holder's son Kenelm Storey (born 1963).

Coat of arms of Storey baronets
Crest In front of an escallop Or a stork's head erased Sable gorged with a mural crown Gold. Escutcheon Per fess Argent and Sable a pale counterchanged three storks also Sable.
