= James Stuart (educator) =

British educator and politician (1843–1913)

The Right Honourable James Stuart

Member of Parliament for Sunderland
- In office 8 February 1906 – 15 January 1910 Serving with Thomas Summerbell
- Preceded by: Sir Theodore Doxford
- Succeeded by: Samuel Storey

Member of Parliament for Hoxton
- In office 18 December 1885 – 26 September 1900
- Preceded by: Constituency created
- Succeeded by: Claude Hay

Member of Parliament for Hackney
- In office 20 November 1884 – 24 November 1885 Serving with John Holms
- Preceded by: Henry Fawcett
- Succeeded by: Constituency abolished

Personal details
- Born: 2 January 1843 Markinch, Fife, Scotland
- Died: 12 October 1913 (aged 70) Norwich, Norfolk, England
- Party: Liberal
- Spouse: Laura Elizabeth Colman (m. 1890)
- Parents: Joseph Gordon Stuart; Catherine Booth
- Education: Madras College; University of St Andrews; Trinity College, Cambridge
- Occupation: Scientist; Educator

James Stuart PC (2 January 1843 – 12 October 1913) was a British educator and politician.

== Early life and background ==
He was born on 2 January 1843, in Fifeshire at Markinch, the eldest son of the textile industrialist Joseph Gordon Stuart with a flax mill—Balgonie Works at Milton of Balgonie—and his wife Catharine Booth, daughter of David Booth. He was the uncle of Josephine Gordon Stuart.

=== Balgonie Mill ===
The Balgonie Mill on the River Leven was founded c.1800, and extended in 1807. It produced yarn that was sent to Dundee, the main products being canvas and sacking.

Joseph Gordon Stuart (1815–1866) was the son of Alexander Stuart WS, and his wife Mary McKnight, and elder brother of Alexander Stuart and Edward Craig Stuart. He was educated at the Edinburgh Academy, took an arts degree at the University of Aberdeen and a law degree at the University of Edinburgh. After a time as barrister he became a flax spinner. The original mill owner William Drummond took into partnership his son-in-law Robert Baxter, and when Drummond retired, Stuart, related to him, became a partner.

Stuart took over the mill when Baxter emigrated to France, in the early 1840s. He innovated by installing a water turbine. He was in some business difficulties during the early 1860s. A partnership Staig & Stuart with Thomas Michael Staig as merchants in Kirkcaldy went into sequestration (a bankruptcy process under Scots law) in 1861. The sequestration was lifted in 1863, but money owed to the Liverpool soap merchant Edward Steele had been directed to support Staig & Stuart, via the London bank Stuart Brothers run by Joseph Gordon Stuart and his brother James Stuart the elder (born 1820), an East India merchant. A chancery case of 1866 followed.

=== Education ===
Stuart attended Madras College and the University of St Andrews before matriculating at Trinity College, Cambridge in 1862. His Cambridge education was supported by the Ferguson Scholarship at St Andrews in 1861, and two college scholarships.

As an undergraduate, Stuart became secretary of the Grote Club (later the Grote Society), founded as a dining club by John Grote in 1847, and by the 1860s a forum for debate on university reform, led by F. D. Maurice after Grote's death in 1866. He graduated B.A. at Trinity College in 1866, as third wrangler, classed equal with William Davidson Niven. He became Fellow of the college in 1867, and graduated M.A. in 1869.

== Continuing education ==
Anne Clough commissioned Stuart to lecture on astronomy, for five cities in the north of England. It resulted from an initial proposal from the North of England Council for Promoting the Higher Education of Women that Stuart, newly graduated at Cambridge, should lecture on educational theory for intending schoolteachers and governesses. These courses led to an invitation in 1867 to lecture at the LNWR-sponsored Mechanics' Institute in Crewe. There was further lecturing work for Stuart from the Rochdale Society of Equitable Pioneers and the North of England Council, and a repeat invitation to Crewe in 1868.

Stuart pioneered continuing education in Liverpool, with the assistance of Josephine Butler and her husband George Butler. In 1869 Stuart arranged the first public speech given by Josephine Butler against the Contagious Diseases Acts. It was in Crewe, to railway workers at the Mechanics' Institute.

In 1873 the University of Cambridge set up its extension scheme for continuing education, which quickly attracted interest from many towns and cities. Stuart said that he had learned the instructional method used, sometimes known as "dictated heads", from James Frederick Ferrier, who had taught him at the University of St Andrews. It became standard for continuing education, with headings circulated for the taking of notes after a lecture.

== Academic ==
Laura Elizabeth Colman

Stuart was Professor of Mechanism and Applied Mechanics at the University of Cambridge from 1875. He resigned his chair in 1889, having failed in attempts at syllabus reform at Cambridge, and by then involved in a political career. He was Lord Rector of St Andrews from 1898 to 1901.

== In politics ==
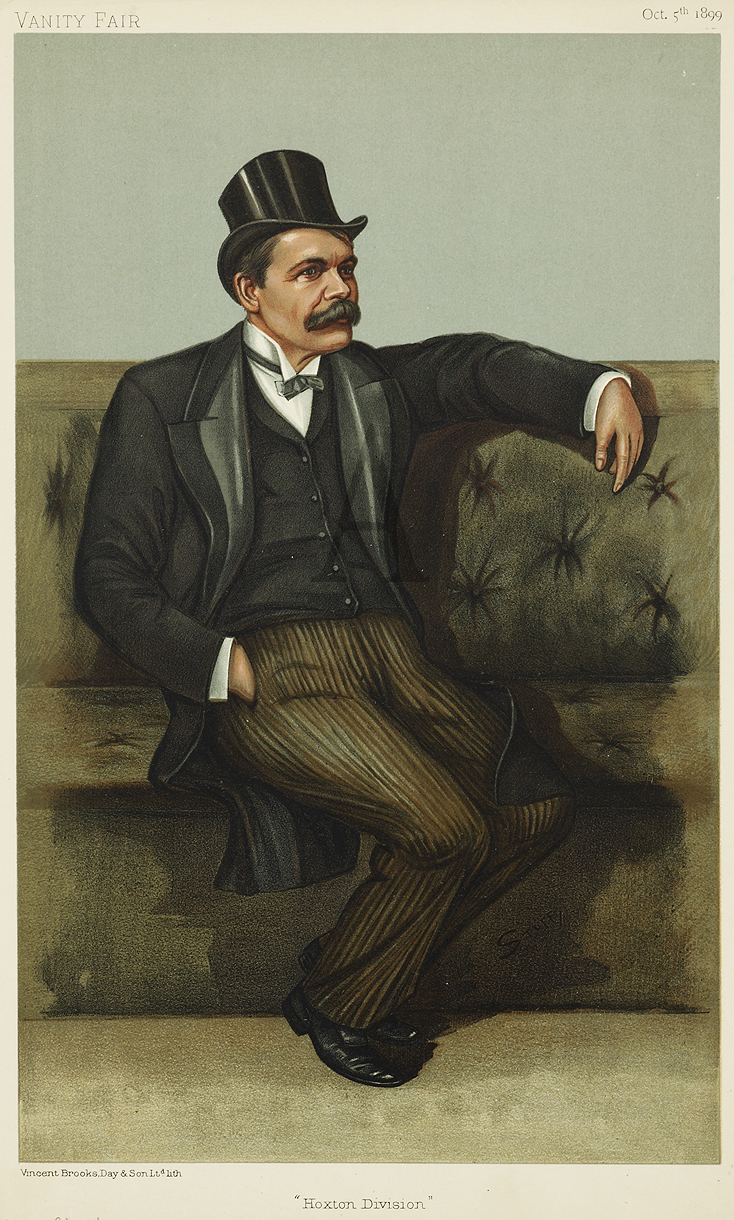
"Hoxton Division", Stuart as caricatured by "Stuff" in Vanity Fair, October 1899

Stuart was an unsuccessful Liberal candidate for the Cambridge University parliamentary seat in an 1882 by-election; in the 1884 by-election he was elected for Hackney.

From the 1885 election, Stuart sat for the Hoxton division of Shoreditch. He became known for his contribution to London politics, as the leading figure in formulating policies for the Liberal "London programme". He was one of the radical Liberals making up the management committee of the Liberal Publication Office, with James Bryce, Percy Bunting and Wemyss Reid. On 14 November 1888, in a House of Commons supply debate, Stuart made a detailed attack on the financial management of the Metropolitan Police. Charles Stuart-Wortley replied the next day for the Home Office. Stuart pressed his points on 3 December in the Daily News. A detailed rebuttal, including the comment that 1887 was an anomalous year given the Golden Jubilee of Queen Victoria, was produced in a memorandum by the Receiver for the Metropolitan Police District, Richard Pennefather.

In 1890, Sidney Webb wrote to Ramsay Macdonald, asking if anything could be done about the opposition shown by Thomas Lough to the "London movement" in general, and Stuart in particular. By 1891, however, Webb found Stuart's resistance to working-class Liberals troublesome, and stole a march with his own London programme. While Lord Rosebery was Premier, Stuart was keen to reform the University of London, but there were opponents including William Job Collins.

Stuart was an Alderman of the London County Council (LCC) from 1889 to 1898. He was an LLC councillor for Haggerston from 1901 to 1901. The Progressive Party on the LCC made him its leader around 1890; he stood down after the 1892 London County Council election.

In the 1900 general election, Stuart lost his seat in Parliament. He was returned for Sunderland from 1906, then again was defeated in January 1910. He was appointed to the Privy Council in 1909.

== Newspaper executive ==
From 1890 to 1898, Stuart edited The Star, a London evening newspaper, and the Morning Leader. It had been founded in 1888 by T. P. O'Connor, as a radical "new journalism" and Home Rule organ, with backing from the industrialists John Brunner and Jeremiah Colman, and the draper James Whitehead. O'Connor was then bought out.

Stuart was brought in as chairman of The Star by his father-in-law Colman. The two papers were owned by the same private company, with Ernest Parke as managing editor, and the Morning Leader, founded in 1892, again had Stuart as chairman.

== Family, death and legacy ==
Stuart married in 1890 Laura Elizabeth Colman (1860–1920), the eldest daughter of Jeremiah Colman and Caroline Colman. She had attended Hannah Elizabeth Pipe's Laleham Boarding School, and Newnham College from 1880 to 1882 where she studied chemistry and Greek. She supported Stuart's political work, taught classes of working men, and was on the council of Stockwell Training College. She was awarded the OBE in 1919. Her sister Ethel Colman was the first female Lord Mayor of Norwich. Stuart was a director of the Colman's family business, and after Jeremiah's death in 1898 ran it for a period.

Stuart suffered from poor health at the end of his life. He published his memoirs Reminiscences in 1912. He died at Carrow Abbey, Norwich on 12 October 1913, aged 70. A family memorial to him was the 1915 erection of a block of 22 flats, to re-house some of those affected by the Norwich flood of 1912. Stuart Court is still used for low-income housing, managed by Norwich Housing Society.

Parliament of the United Kingdom
Preceded by Henry Fawcett; John Holms	Member of Parliament for Hackney; 1884–1885; With: John Holms	Constituency abolished
New constituency	Member of Parliament for Hoxton; 1885–1900	Succeeded by Claude Hay
Preceded by Theodore Doxford; John Stapylton Grey Pemberton	Member of Parliament for Sunderland; 1906 – January 1910; With: Thomas Summerbell	Succeeded by Samuel Storey; James Knott
Party political offices
Preceded by Thomas Farrer	Leader of the Progressive Party; 1890–1892	Succeeded by Charles Harrison
Academic offices
Preceded by The Marquess of Bute	Rector of the University of St Andrews; 1898–1901	Succeeded by Andrew Carnegie
