= Frank Goldstone =

British teacher, trade unionist and Labour MP (1870–1955)

Sir Frank Goldstone
- Goldstone c. 1916

Member of Parliament for Sunderland
- In office 1910–1918 Serving with Sir Hamar Greenwood
- Preceded by: James Knott
- Succeeded by: Ralph Milbanke Hudson

Personal details
- Born: 7 December 1870 Bishopwearmouth, County Durham, England
- Died: 25 December 1955 (aged 85) Ipswich, Suffolk, England
- Party: Labour
- Education: Borough Road Training College
- Occupation: Teacher

Sir Frank Walter Goldstone (7 December 1870 – 25 December 1955) was a British teacher, trade unionist and politician.

== Biography ==
Goldstone was born in Bishopwearmouth, County Durham (now Sunderland) on 7 December 1870. The third son of a stained-glass artist, he attended Borough Road Traininge College, Isleworth after completing education at Diamond Hall in Millfield.

From 1891 to 1910, Goldstone was an assistant master at Bow Street school in Sheffield. In 1895, he had married Elizabeth Alice Henderson of Whittingham, Northumberland. They had two children, Elsie (born 1897) and Frank (born 1899).

A member of the National Union of Teachers (NUT), he became president of the subgroup National Federation of Class Teachers in 1902, a member of the executive committee of the NUT in 1902 and chair of its law committee in 1904. In 1910, he stepped up his participation in the NUT, serving as organization secretary (1910–1918), assistant secretary (1918–1924) and finally general secretary (1924–1931).

== Politics ==
Shortly before the December 1910 election, Goldstone was chosen as the Labour candidate for Sunderland, as a late replacement for R. J. Wilson (a member of the Co-operative Society). After winning the seat, he was appointed Labour Chief Whip in 1914. He lost his seat at the 1918 election.

== Later life ==
Goldstone was knighted by George V at Buckingham Palace on 29 June 1931, the same year he retired as general secretary of NUT.

Subsequently, he served three years as principal of a tutorial college. In 1942 his wife died in Ipswich, and Goldstone followed in the same town on 25 December 1955.

Parliament of the United Kingdom
Preceded by Samuel Storey and James Knott	Member of Parliament for Sunderland; Dec. 1910–1918; With: Sir Hamar Greenwood, Bt.	Succeeded by Sir Hamar Greenwood, Bt. and Ralph Milbanke Hudson
Political offices
Preceded by Arthur Henderson	Labour Chief Whip; 1914–1916	Succeeded by George Henry Roberts
Educational offices
Preceded by John Wilson	Member of the Senate of the University of Durham; 1915–1921	Succeeded by Peter Lee
Trade union offices
Preceded by Sir James Yoxall	General Secretary of the National Union of Teachers; 1924–1931	Succeeded by Frederick Mander
