= David Drummond (physician) =

Anglo-Irish physician

Sir David Drummond CBE
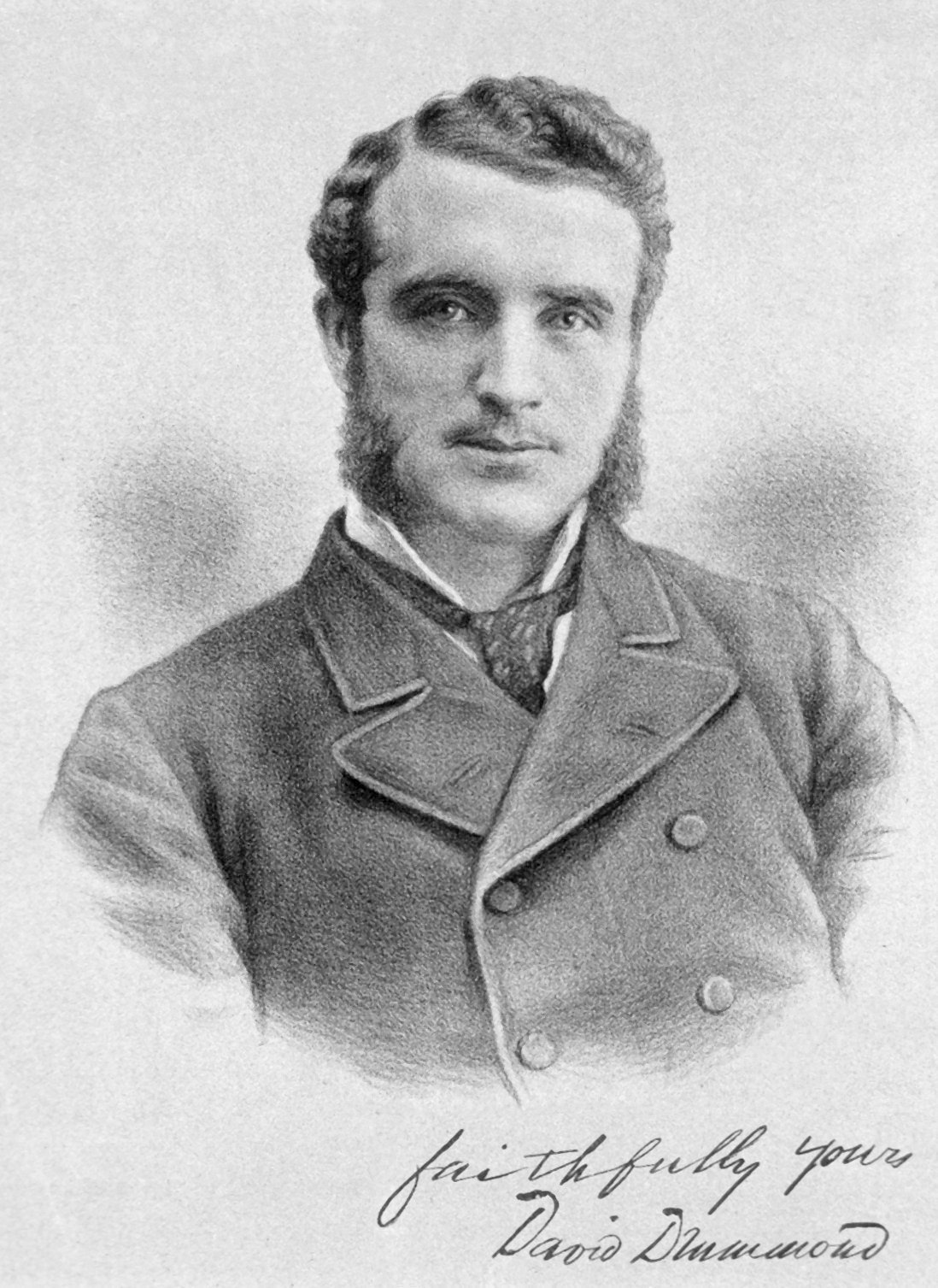

Vice-Chancellor of the University of Durham
- In office 1920–1922
- Preceded by: John Stapylton Grey Pemberton
- Succeeded by: Prof Arthur Robinson

Personal details
- Born: December 1852
- Died: 28 April 1932 (aged 79)
- Education: Trinity College, Dublin
- Profession: Academic; Physician; Vice-Chancellor

Sir David Drummond CBE (December 1852 – 28 April 1932) was an Anglo-Irish physician and president of the British Medical Association. He was warden and vice-chancellor of the University of Durham between 1920 and 1922, having also served as the president of the university's College of Medicine in Newcastle.

Drummond was the son of David Drummond of Rathgar, Dublin. He studied medicine at Trinity College, Dublin, graduating MB and MCh in 1874. He was initially an assistant physician at the Sick Children's Hospital, Newcastle, before being elected to the position of honorary pathologist and physician at the Royal Victoria Infirmary, Newcastle, in 1878. He retired in 1912 as consulting physician. During the First World War, he served as senior physician at the Northumberland War Hospital, for which he was appointed Commander of the Order of the British Empire (CBE) in January 1920.

Drummond's academic career at Durham spanned over fifty years. He eventually succeeded Sir George Hare Philipson as Professor of the Principles and Practice of Medicine, having previously held lectureships in pathology, physiology and therapeutics.

He was a Fellow of the Royal Society of Medicine and the Royal Academy of Medicine in Ireland. From 1925 to 1926, Drummond served as a member of the Royal Commission on Lunacy Law and Administration.

Drummond was knighted in 1923.

== Legacy ==
Drummond is known for discovering the marginal artery of Drummond.

Academic offices
Preceded by John Stapylton Grey Pemberton	Warden & Vice-Chancellor of the University of Durham; 1920–1922	Succeeded by Arthur Robinson
