= Sunderland (constituency) =

Parliamentary constituency in the United Kingdom, 1832–1950

- Former borough constituency for the House of Commons

1832–1950
- Seats: Two
- Replaced by: Sunderland North and Sunderland South

Sunderland was a borough constituency in the House of Commons of the United Kingdom, created by the Reform Act 1832 for the 1832 general election. It elected two Members of Parliament (MPs) by the bloc vote system. It was split into the single-member seats of Sunderland North and Sunderland South for the 1950 general election.

== Boundaries ==
=== 1832-1918 ===
Under the Parliamentary Boundaries Act 1832, the contents of the borough were defined as the Parish of Sunderland and the several townships of Bishop Wearmouth, Bishop Wearmouth Panns, Monk Wearmouth, Monk Wearmouth Shore, and Southwick.

See map on Vision of Britain website.

Minor change in 1868 to include a small part of the Municipal Borough not in the Parliamentary Borough.

=== 1918-1950 ===
- The County Borough of Sunderland
- The Urban District of Southwick-on-Wear.

Minor changes to align boundaries with those of local authorities.

== Members of Parliament ==
| Year | 1st Member | 1st Party | 2nd Member | 2nd Party |
|---|---|---|---|---|
| 1832 | Sir William Chaytor | Whig | George Barrington | Whig |
| 1833 | Sir William Chaytor | Whig | William Thompson | Tory |
| 1834 | Sir William Chaytor | Whig | William Thompson | Conservative |
| 1835 | David Barclay | Whig | William Thompson | Conservative |
| 1837 | Andrew White | Whig | William Thompson | Conservative |
| 1841 | David Barclay | Whig | William Thompson | Conservative |
| 1841 | David Barclay | Whig | Viscount Howick | Whig |
| 1845 | David Barclay | Whig | George Hudson | Conservative |
| 1847 | Sir Hedworth Williamson | Whig | George Hudson | Conservative |
| 1852 | William Seymour | Radical | George Hudson | Conservative |
| 1855 | Henry Fenwick | Whig | George Hudson | Conservative |
| 1859 | Henry Fenwick | Liberal | William Schaw Lindsay | Liberal |
| 1865 | Henry Fenwick | Liberal | James Hartley | Conservative |
| 1866 | John Candlish | Liberal | James Hartley | Conservative |
| 1868 | John Candlish | Liberal | Edward Temperley Gourley | Liberal |
| 1874 | Sir Henry Havelock-Allan | Liberal | Edward Temperley Gourley | Liberal |
| 1881 | Samuel Storey | Liberal | Edward Temperley Gourley | Liberal |
| 1895 | Theodore Doxford | Unionist | Edward Temperley Gourley | Liberal |
| 1900 | Theodore Doxford | Unionist | John Stapylton Grey Pemberton | Conservative |
| 1906 | James Stuart | Liberal | Thomas Summerbell | Labour |
| 1910 | Samuel Storey | Independent Conservative | James Knott | Conservative |
| 1910 | Sir Hamar Greenwood | Liberal | Frank Goldstone | Labour |
| 1916 | Sir Hamar Greenwood | Coalition Liberal | Frank Goldstone | Labour |
| 1918 | Sir Hamar Greenwood | Coalition Liberal | Ralph Milbanke Hudson | Unionist |
| Jan 1922 | Sir Hamar Greenwood | National Liberal | Ralph Milbanke Hudson | Unionist |
| 1922 | Luke Thompson | Unionist | Walter Raine | Unionist |
| 1929 | Marion Phillips | Labour | Alfred Smith | Labour |
| 1931 | Marion Phillips | Labour | Luke Thompson | Conservative |
| 1931 | Samuel Storey | Conservative | Luke Thompson | Conservative |
| 1935 | Samuel Storey | Conservative | Stephen Furness | Liberal National |
| 1945 | Richard Ewart | Labour | Fred Willey | Labour |
| 1950 | constituency abolished | | | |

== Election results ==
=== Elections in the 1830s ===
General election 1832: Sunderland
| Party | Candidate | Votes | % |
|---|---|---|---|
| Whig | William Chaytor | 697 | 34.5 |
| Whig | George Barrington | 525 | 26.0 |
| Whig | David Barclay | 404 | 20.0 |
| Tory | William Thompson | 392 | 19.4 |
| Majority | | 121 | 6.0 |
| Turnout | | 1,132 | 82.1 |
| Registered electors | | 1,378 | |
| Whig win (new seat) | | | |
| Whig win (new seat) | | | |

Barrington resigned, causing a by-election.

By-election, 4 April 1833: Sunderland
| Party | Candidate | Votes | % | ±% |
|---|---|---|---|---|
| Tory | William Thompson | 574 | 50.8 | +31.4 |
| Whig | David Barclay | 556 | 49.2 | −31.3 |
| Majority | | 18 | 1.6 | N/A |
| Turnout | | 1,130 | 82.0 | −0.1 |
| Registered electors | | 1,378 | | |
| Tory gain from Whig | | Swing | +31.3 | |

General election 1835: Sunderland
| Party | Candidate | Votes | % | ±% |
|---|---|---|---|---|
| Conservative | William Thompson | 844 | 43.5 | +24.1 |
| Whig | David Barclay | 709 | 36.5 | +16.5 |
| Whig | William Chaytor | 389 | 20.0 | −14.5 |
| Turnout | | 1,107 | 81.5 | −0.6 |
| Registered electors | | 1,359 | | |
| Majority | | 455 | 23.5 | N/A |
| Conservative gain from Whig | | Swing | +11.6 | |
| Majority | | 320 | 16.5 | +10.5 |
| Whig hold | | Swing | +2.2 | |

General election 1837: Sunderland
| Party | Candidate | Votes | % | ±% |
|---|---|---|---|---|
| Conservative | William Thompson | 688 | 36.1 | −7.4 |
| Whig | Andrew White (MP) | 628 | 32.9 | +12.9 |
| Whig | David Barclay | 591 | 31.0 | −5.5 |
| Turnout | | 1,176 | 76.8 | −4.7 |
| Registered electors | | 1,532 | | |
| Majority | | 60 | 3.2 | −20.3 |
| Conservative hold | | Swing | −7.4 | |
| Majority | | 37 | 1.9 | −14.6 |
| Whig hold | | Swing | +8.3 | |

=== Elections in the 1840s ===
General election 1841: Sunderland
| Party | Candidate | Votes | % | ±% |
|---|---|---|---|---|
| Conservative | William Thompson | Unopposed | | |
| Whig | David Barclay | Unopposed | | |
| Registered electors | | 1,691 | | |
| Conservative hold | | | | |
| Whig hold | | | | |

Thompson resigned by accepting the office of Steward of the Chiltern Hundreds in order to contest a by-election at Westmorland, causing a by-election.

By-election, 17 September 1841: Sunderland
| Party | Candidate | Votes | % | ±% |
|---|---|---|---|---|
| Whig | Henry Grey | 706 | 60.4 | N/A |
| Conservative | Matthias Wolverley Attwood | 462 | 39.6 | N/A |
| Majority | | 244 | 20.8 | N/A |
| Turnout | | 1,168 | 69.1 | N/A |
| Registered electors | | 1,691 | | |
| Whig gain from Conservative | | Swing | N/A | |

Grey succeeded to the peerage, becoming 3rd Earl Grey and causing a by-election.

By-election, 15 August 1845: Sunderland
| Party | Candidate | Votes | % | ±% |
|---|---|---|---|---|
| Conservative | George Hudson | 627 | 55.7 | N/A |
| Radical | Thomas Perronet Thompson | 498 | 44.3 | New |
| Majority | | 129 | 11.4 | N/A |
| Turnout | | 1,125 | 66.9 | N/A |
| Registered electors | | 1,681 | | |
| Conservative gain from Whig | | Swing | N/A | |

General election 1847: Sunderland
| Party | Candidate | Votes | % | ±% |
|---|---|---|---|---|
| Conservative | George Hudson | 879 | 42.1 | N/A |
| Whig | David Barclay | 642 | 30.7 | N/A |
| Radical | William Arthur Wilkinson | 568 | 27.2 | N/A |
| Turnout | | 1,045 (est) | 61.7 (est) | N/A |
| Registered electors | | 1,693 | | |
| Majority | | 237 | 11.4 | N/A |
| Conservative hold | | Swing | N/A | |
| Majority | | 74 | 3.5 | N/A |
| Whig hold | | Swing | N/A | |

Barclay resigned by accepting the office of Steward of the Chiltern Hundreds, causing a by-election.

By-election, 22 December 1847: Sunderland
| Party | Candidate | Votes | % | ±% |
|---|---|---|---|---|
| Whig | Hedworth Williamson | 705 | 55.0 | +24.3 |
| Radical | William Arthur Wilkinson | 576 | 45.0 | +17.8 |
| Majority | | 129 | 10.0 | +6.5 |
| Turnout | | 1,281 | 75.7 | +14.0 |
| Registered electors | | 1,692 | | |
| Whig hold | | Swing | +3.3 | |

=== Elections in the 1850s ===
General election 1852: Sunderland
| Party | Candidate | Votes | % | ±% |
|---|---|---|---|---|
| Conservative | George Hudson | 868 | 37.2 | −4.9 |
| Radical | William Digby Seymour | 814 | 34.8 | +7.6 |
| Whig | Henry Fenwick | 654 | 28.0 | −2.7 |
| Turnout | | 1,168 (est) | 59.2 (est) | −2.5 |
| Registered electors | | 1,973 | | |
| Majority | | 54 | 2.4 | −9.0 |
| Conservative hold | | Swing | −4.4 | |
| Majority | | 160 | 6.8 | N/A |
| Radical gain from Whig | | Swing | +4.5 | |

Seymour was appointed Recorder of Newcastle upon Tyne, requiring a by-election.

By-election, 2 January 1855: Sunderland
| Party | Candidate | Votes | % | ±% |
|---|---|---|---|---|
| Whig | Henry Fenwick | 956 | 59.7 | +31.7 |
| Radical | William Digby Seymour | 646 | 40.3 | +5.5 |
| Majority | | 310 | 19.4 | N/A |
| Turnout | | 1,602 | 73.6 | +14.4 |
| Registered electors | | 2,176 | | |
| Whig gain from Radical | | Swing | +13.1 | |

General election 1857: Sunderland
| Party | Candidate | Votes | % | ±% |
|---|---|---|---|---|
| Whig | Henry Fenwick | 1,123 | 36.6 | +8.6 |
| Conservative | George Hudson | 1,081 | 35.2 | −2.0 |
| Radical | Ralph Walters | 863 | 28.1 | −6.7 |
| Turnout | | 1,534 (est) | 61.5 (est) | +2.3 |
| Registered electors | | 2,493 | | |
| Majority | | 260 | 8.5 | N/A |
| Whig gain from Radical | | Swing | +7.7 | |
| Majority | | 218 | 8.5 | +6.1 |
| Conservative hold | | Swing | −3.2 | |

General election 1859: Sunderland
| Party | Candidate | Votes | % | ±% |
|---|---|---|---|---|
| Liberal | Henry Fenwick | 1,527 | 42.3 | +5.7 |
| Liberal | William Schaw Lindsay | 1,292 | 35.8 | +7.7 |
| Conservative | George Hudson | 790 | 21.9 | −13.3 |
| Majority | | 502 | 13.9 | N/A |
| Turnout | | 2,200 (est) | 80.6 (est) | +19.1 |
| Registered electors | | 2,493 | | |
| Liberal hold | | Swing | +6.2 | |
| Liberal gain from Conservative | | Swing | +7.2 | |

=== Elections in the 1860s ===
General election 1865: Sunderland
| Party | Candidate | Votes | % | ±% |
|---|---|---|---|---|
| Liberal | Henry Fenwick | 1,826 | 40.7 | −1.6 |
| Conservative | James Hartley | 1,355 | 30.2 | +8.3 |
| Liberal | John Candlish | 1,307 | 29.1 | −6.7 |
| Turnout | | 2,922 (est) | 84.2 (est) | +3.6 |
| Registered electors | | 3,468 | | |
| Majority | | 471 | 10.5 | −3.4 |
| Liberal hold | | Swing | −2.9 | |
| Majority | | 48 | 1.1 | N/A |
| Conservative gain from Liberal | | Swing | +8.3 | |

Fenwick was appointed a Civil Lord of the Admiralty, requiring a by-election.

By-election, 28 February 1866: Sunderland
| Party | Candidate | Votes | % | ±% |
|---|---|---|---|---|
| Liberal | John Candlish | 1,430 | 52.5 | +23.4 |
| Liberal | Henry Fenwick | 1,294 | 47.5 | +6.8 |
| Majority | | 136 | 5.0 | N/A |
| Turnout | | 2,724 | 78.5 | −5.7 |
| Registered electors | | 3,468 | | |
| Liberal hold | | Swing | N/A | |

General election 1868: Sunderland
| Party | Candidate | Votes | % | ±% |
|---|---|---|---|---|
| Liberal | John Candlish | 6,237 | 42.3 | +13.2 |
| Liberal | Edward Temperley Gourley | 4,901 | 33.3 | N/A |
| Liberal | Thomas Charles Thompson | 3,596 | 24.4 | N/A |
| Majority | | 1,305 | 8.9 | −1.6 |
| Turnout | | 7,367 (est) | 64.8 (est) | −19.4 |
| Registered electors | | 11,364 | | |
| Liberal hold | | Swing | N/A | |
| Liberal gain from Conservative | | Swing | N/A | |

=== Elections in the 1870s ===
General election 1874: Sunderland
| Party | Candidate | Votes | % | ±% |
|---|---|---|---|---|
| Liberal | Edward Temperley Gourley | 6,172 | 38.9 | +5.6 |
| Liberal | Henry Havelock | 5,920 | 37.3 | N/A |
| Conservative | Laurence Richardson Baily | 3,781 | 23.8 | New |
| Majority | | 2,139 | 13.5 | +4.6 |
| Turnout | | 9,827 (est) | 70.2 (est) | +5.4 |
| Registered electors | | 14,008 | | |
| Liberal hold | | Swing | N/A | |
| Liberal hold | | Swing | N/A | |

=== Elections in the 1880s ===
General election 1880: Sunderland
| Party | Candidate | Votes | % | ±% |
|---|---|---|---|---|
| Liberal | Edward Temperley Gourley | 7,639 | 40.4 | +1.5 |
| Liberal | Henry Havelock-Allan | 6,995 | 37.0 | −0.3 |
| Conservative | Edward Brooke | 4,262 | 22.6 | −1.2 |
| Majority | | 2,733 | 14.4 | +0.9 |
| Turnout | | 11,901 (est) | 79.2 (est) | +9.0 |
| Registered electors | | 15,021 | | |
| Liberal hold | | Swing | +1.1 | |
| Liberal hold | | Swing | +0.2 | |

Allan resigned, causing a by-election.

By-election, 12 Apr 1881: Sunderland
| Party | Candidate | Votes | % | ±% |
|---|---|---|---|---|
| Liberal | Samuel Storey | Unopposed | | |
| Liberal hold | | | | |

General election 1885: Sunderland
| Party | Candidate | Votes | % | ±% |
|---|---|---|---|---|
| Liberal | Samuel Storey | 8,295 | 36.4 | −0.6 |
| Liberal | Edward Temperley Gourley | 7,759 | 34.1 | −6.3 |
| Conservative | Samuel Peter Austin | 6,703 | 29.5 | +6.9 |
| Majority | | 1,056 | 4.6 | −9.8 |
| Turnout | | 14,416 | 79.7 | +0.5 (est) |
| Registered electors | | 18,078 | | |
| Liberal hold | | Swing | −2.0 | |
| Liberal hold | | Swing | −4.9 | |

General election 1886: Sunderland
| Party | Candidate | Votes | % | ±% |
|---|---|---|---|---|
| Liberal | Samuel Storey | 6,971 | 35.1 | −1.3 |
| Liberal | Edward Temperley Gourley | 6,840 | 34.5 | +0.4 |
| Liberal Unionist | William Stobart | 6,027 | 30.4 | +0.9 |
| Majority | | 813 | 4.1 | −0.5 |
| Turnout | | 12,863 | 71.2 | −9.5 |
| Registered electors | | 18,078 | | |
| Liberal hold | | Swing | −0.9 | |
| Liberal hold | | Swing | 0.0 | |

=== Elections in the 1890s ===
General election 1892: Sunderland
| Party | Candidate | Votes | % | ±% |
|---|---|---|---|---|
| Liberal | ✓ Samuel Storey | 9,711 | 27.3 | −7.8 |
| Liberal | ✓ Edward Temperley Gourley | 9,554 | 26.8 | −7.7 |
| Liberal Unionist | Frederick Lambton | 8,394 | 23.5 | −6.9 |
| Conservative | John Stapylton Grey Pemberton | 8,002 | 22.4 | N/A |
| Majority | | 1,160 | 3.3 | −0.8 |
| Turnout | | 17,990 | 80.7 | +9.5 |
| Registered electors | | 22,282 | | |
| Liberal hold | | Swing | −0.5 | |
| Liberal hold | | Swing | −0.4 | |

Doxford

General election 1895: Sunderland
| Party | Candidate | Votes | % | ±% |
|---|---|---|---|---|
| Conservative | ✓ Theodore Doxford | 9,833 | 37.4 | +15.0 |
| Liberal | ✓ Edward Temperley Gourley | 8,232 | 31.4 | +4.6 |
| Liberal | Samuel Storey | 8,185 | 31.2 | +3.9 |
| Majority | | 1,648 | 6.2 | N/A |
| Turnout | | 17,910 | 79.9 | −0.8 |
| Registered electors | | 22,408 | | |
| Conservative gain from Liberal | | Swing | +5.2 | |
| Liberal hold | | Swing | | |

=== Elections in the 1900s ===
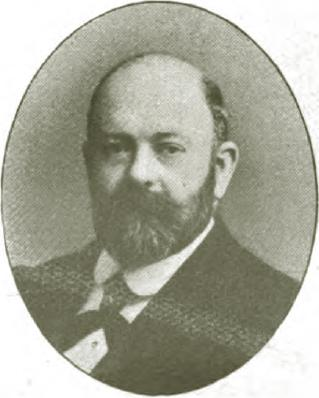
Wilkie

General election 1900: Sunderland
| Party | Candidate | Votes | % | ±% |
|---|---|---|---|---|
| Conservative | ✓ Theodore Doxford | 9,617 | 25.7 | +7.0'"`UNIQ−−ref−000000D7−QINU`"' |
| Conservative | ✓ John Stapylton Grey Pemberton | 9,566 | 25.6 | +6.9'"`UNIQ−−ref−000000D8−QINU`"' |
| Liberal | George Burton Hunter | 9,370 | 25.1 | −37.5'"`UNIQ−−ref−000000D9−QINU`"' |
| Labour Repr. Cmte. | Alexander Wilkie | 8,842 | 23.6 | New |
| Majority | | 196 | 0.5 | N/A |
| Turnout | | 37,395 | 78.3 | −1.6 |
| Registered electors | | 24,423 | | |
| Conservative hold | | Swing | +22.3 | |
| Conservative gain from Liberal | | Swing | +22.2 | |

- some records describe Wilkie as Liberal-Labour

Stuart

General election 1906: Sunderland
| Party | Candidate | Votes | % | ±% |
|---|---|---|---|---|
| Liberal | ✓ James Stuart | 13,620 | 32.2 | +7.1 |
| Labour Repr. Cmte. | ✓ Thomas Summerbell | 13,430 | 31.9 | +8.3 |
| Conservative | DH Haggle | 7,879 | 18.7 | −7.0 |
| Conservative | John Stapylton Grey Pemberton | 7,244 | 17.2 | −8.4 |
| Turnout | | 42,173 | 85.5 | +7.2 |
| Registered electors | | 27,650 | | |
| Majority | | 5,741 | 13.5 | N/A |
| Liberal gain from Conservative | | Swing | +7.1 | |
| Majority | | 6,186 | 14.7 | N/A |
| Labour Repr. Cmte. gain from Conservative | | Swing | +8.4 | |

=== Elections in the 1910s ===
General election January 1910: Sunderland
| Party | Candidate | Votes | % | ±% |
|---|---|---|---|---|
| Ind. Conservative | ✓ *Samuel Storey | 12,334 | 26.2 | New |
| Conservative | ✓ James Knott | 12,270 | 26.0 | +7.3 |
| Liberal | James Stuart | 11,529 | 24.4 | −7.8 |
| Labour | Thomas Summerbell | 11,058 | 23.4 | −8.5 |
| Turnout | | 47,191 | 87.2 | +1.7 |
| Registered electors | | 27,610 | | |
| Majority | | 805 | 1.8 | N/A |
| Ind. Conservative gain from Liberal | | Swing | N/A | |
| Majority | | 1,212 | 2.6 | N/A |
| Conservative gain from Labour | | Swing | +7.6 | |

- stood as "Independent Tariff Reform" but was supported by local Conservative Association

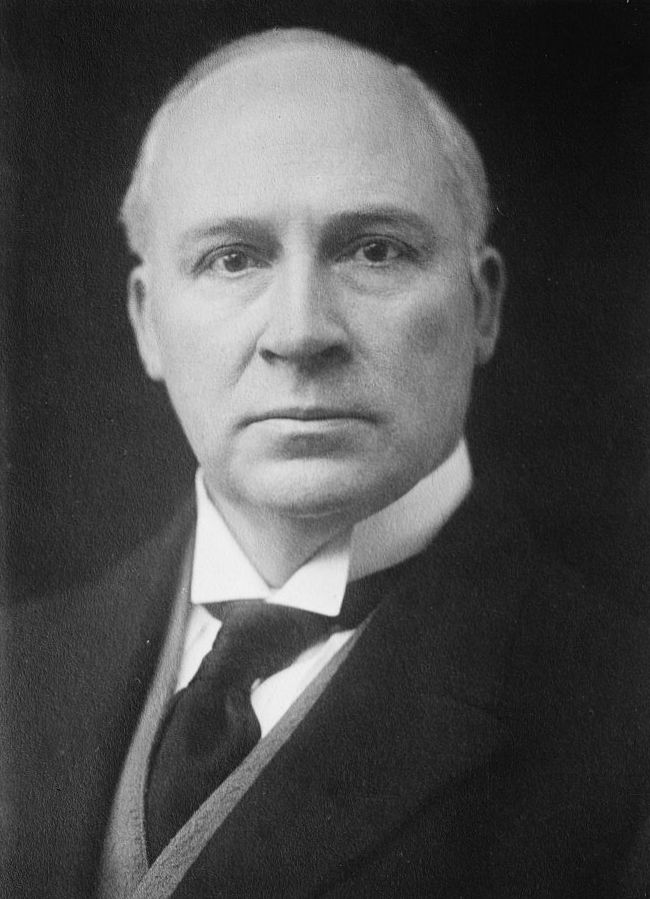
Greenwood

General election December 1910: Sunderland
| Party | Candidate | Votes | % | ±% |
|---|---|---|---|---|
| Liberal | ✓ Hamar Greenwood | 11,997 | 27.4 | +3.0 |
| Labour | ✓ Frank Goldstone | 11,291 | 25.8 | +2.4 |
| Conservative | William Joynson-Hicks | 10,300 | 23.6 | −2.4 |
| Conservative | Samuel Samuel | 10,132 | 23.2 | N/A |
| Turnout | | 43,720 | 81.2 | −6.0 |
| Registered electors | | 27,610 | | |
| Majority | | 1,697 | 3.8 | N/A |
| Liberal gain from Ind. Conservative | | Swing | N/A | |
| Majority | | 1,059 | 2.6 | N/A |
| Labour gain from Conservative | | Swing | +2.4 | |

General Election 1914–15:

Another General Election was required to take place before the end of 1915. The political parties had been making preparations for an election to take place and by July 1914, the following candidates had been selected;

- Liberal: Hamar Greenwood
- Labour: Frank Goldstone
- Unionist:

General election 1918: Sunderland
| Party | | Candidate | Votes | % | ±% |
|---|---|---|---|---|---|
| C | National Liberal | ✓ Hamar Greenwood | 27,646 | 43.9 | +16.5 |
| | Unionist | ✓ Ralph Milbanke Hudson | 25,698 | 40.8 | −6.0 |
| | Labour | Frank Goldstone | 9,603 | 15.3 | −10.5 |
| Turnout | | | 62,947 | 56.4 | −24.8 |
| Majority | | | 18,043 | 28.6 | +24.8 |
| | National Liberal hold | | Swing | +11.3 | |
| Majority | | | 16,095 | 25.5 | N/A |
| | Unionist gain from Labour | | Swing | +2.3 | |
C indicates candidate endorsed by the coalition government.

=== Elections in the 1920s ===
1920 Sunderland by-election
| Party | Candidate | Votes | % | ±% |
|---|---|---|---|---|
| National Liberal | Hamar Greenwood | 22,813 | 54.0 | +10.1 |
| Labour | Vickerman Rutherford | 14,379 | 34.0 | +18.7 |
| Liberal | E.M. Howe | 5,065 | 12.0 | −31.9 |
| Majority | | 8,434 | 20.0 | −8.6 |
| Turnout | | 42,257 | 55.4 | −1.0 |
| National Liberal hold | | Swing | -4.3 | |

General election 1922: Sunderland
| Party | Candidate | Votes | % | ±% |
|---|---|---|---|---|
| Unionist | Walter Raine | 28,001 | 25.0 | New |
| Unionist | Luke Thompson | 24,591 | 22.0 | New |
| National Liberal | Hamar Greenwood | 19,058 | 17.0 | N/A |
| Labour | David Baxter Lawley | 13,683 | 12.2 | −3.1 |
| Labour | Vickerman Rutherford | 13,490 | 12.1 | N/A |
| Liberal | Andrew Common | 13,036 | 11.7 | −32.2 |
| Turnout | | 111,859 | 81.6 | +26.2 |
| Majority | | 5,533 | 8.0 | −17.5 |
| Unionist hold | | Swing | | |
| Majority | | 5,541 | 5.0 | N/A |
| Unionist gain from National Liberal | | Swing | | |

General election 1923: Sunderland
| Party | Candidate | Votes | % | ±% |
|---|---|---|---|---|
| Unionist | ✓ Walter Raine | 23,497 | 19.9 | −6.1 |
| Unionist | ✓ Luke Thompson | 23,379 | 19.8 | −2.2 |
| Liberal | Andrew Common | 22,438 | 19.0 | +7.3 |
| Liberal | Hamar Greenwood | 22,034 | 18.6 | N/A |
| Labour | David Baxter Lawley | 13,707 | 11.6 | −0.6 |
| Labour | Tom Gillinder | 13,184 | 11.1 | −1.0 |
| Majority | | 1,905 | 0.8 | −7.2 |
| Turnout | | 118,239 | 77.9 | −3.7 |
| Unionist hold | | Swing | | |

General election 1924: Sunderland
| Party | Candidate | Votes | % | ±% |
|---|---|---|---|---|
| Unionist | ✓ Luke Thompson | 28,612 | 25.4 | +5.6 |
| Unionist | ✓ Walter Raine | 28,608 | 25.3 | +5.4 |
| Labour | Jeremiah McVeagh | 21,823 | 19.3 | +7.7 |
| Liberal | Andrew Common | 20,139 | 17.8 | −1.2 |
| Liberal | Ian Hannah | 13,731 | 12.2 | −6.4 |
| Majority | | 6,785 | 6.0 | +5.2 |
| Turnout | | 112,913 | 84.6 | +6.7 |
| Unionist hold | | Swing | | |
| Unionist gain from Liberal | | Swing | | |

General election 1929: Sunderland
| Party | Candidate | Votes | % | ±% |
|---|---|---|---|---|
| Labour | ✓ Marion Phillips | 31,794 | 19.5 | +0.2 |
| Labour | ✓ Alfred Smith | 31,085 | 19.0 | N/A |
| Unionist | Walter Raine | 29,180 | 17.9 | −7.4 |
| Unionist | Luke Thompson | 28,937 | 17.7 | −7.7 |
| Liberal | Elizabeth Morgan | 21,300 | 13.0 | −4.8 |
| Liberal | John Pratt | 21,142 | 12.9 | +0.7 |
| Majority | | 1,905 | 1.1 | N/A |
| Turnout | | 163,438 | 81.1 | −3.5 |
| Labour gain from Unionist | | Swing | | |

=== Elections in the 1930s ===
1931 Sunderland by-election
| Party | Candidate | Votes | % | ±% |
|---|---|---|---|---|
| Conservative | ✓ Luke Thompson | 30,497 | 40.3 | +3.7 |
| Labour | James Thomas Brownlie | 30,074 | 39.8 | +1.3 |
| Liberal | Elizabeth Morgan | 15,020 | 19.9 | +1.3 |
| Majority | | 423 | 0.5 | N/A |
| Turnout | | 75,591 | 73.1 | −8.0 |
| Conservative gain from Labour | | Swing | | |

General election 1931: Sunderland
| Party | Candidate | Votes | % | ±% |
|---|---|---|---|---|
| Conservative | ✓ Luke Thompson | 53,386 | 32.3 | +14.6 |
| Conservative | ✓ Samuel Storey | 52,589 | 31.8 | +13.9 |
| Labour | Marion Phillips | 29,707 | 18.0 | −1.5 |
| Labour | Denis Pritt | 29,680 | 17.9 | −1.1 |
| Majority | | 22,882 | 13.8 | N/A |
| Turnout | | 165,362 | 81.1 | 0.0 |
| Conservative hold | | Swing | | |
| Conservative gain from Labour | | Swing | | |

General election 1935: Sunderland
| Party | Candidate | Votes | % | ±% |
|---|---|---|---|---|
| National Liberal (Conservative) | ✓ Stephen Furness | 49,001 | 30.2 | -2.1 |
| Conservative | ✓ Samuel Storey | 48,760 | 30.0 | −1.8 |
| Labour | George Catlin | 32,483 | 20.0 | +2.0 |
| Labour | Leah Manning | 32,059 | 19.8 | +1.9 |
| Majority | | 16,277 | 10.0 | −3.8 |
| Turnout | | 162,303 | 79.0 | −2.1 |
| Conservative hold | | Swing | | |
| National Liberal gain from Conservative | | Swing | | |

=== Elections in the 1940s ===
General Election 1939–40

Another General Election was required to take place before the end of 1940. The political parties had been making preparations for an election to take place and by the Autumn of 1939, the following candidates had been selected;

- Conservative: Samuel Storey
- Liberal National: Stephen Furness
- Labour: Fred Peart, Fred Willey

General election 1945: Sunderland
| Party | Candidate | Votes | % | ±% |
|---|---|---|---|---|
| Labour | ✓ Fred Willey | 38,769 | 28.1 | +8.1 |
| Labour | ✓ Richard Ewart | 36,711 | 26.6 | +6.8 |
| National Liberal (Conservative) | Stephen Furness | 29,366 | 21.3 | −8.9 |
| Conservative | Samuel Storey | 28,579 | 20.7 | −9.3 |
| Communist | Tommy Richardson | 4,501 | 3.3 | New |
| Majority | | 9,403 | 6.8 | N/A |
| Majority | | 8,132 | 5.9 | N/A |
| Turnout | | 137,926 | 77.2 | −1.8 |
| Labour gain from Conservative | | Swing | | |
| Labour gain from National Liberal | | Swing | | |

== See also ==
- History of parliamentary constituencies and boundaries in Durham

== Notes and references ==
=== Sources ===
- Craig, F. W. S. (1983) [1969]. British parliamentary election results 1918-1949 (3rd ed.). Chichester: Parliamentary Research Services. ISBN 0-900178-06-X.
- Leigh Rayment's Historical List of MPs – Constituencies beginning with "S" (part 6)
