= Luke Thompson (politician) =

British coal merchant and Conservative politician

Sir Luke Thompson (18 July 1867 – 15 January 1941) was a British coal merchant and Conservative politician.

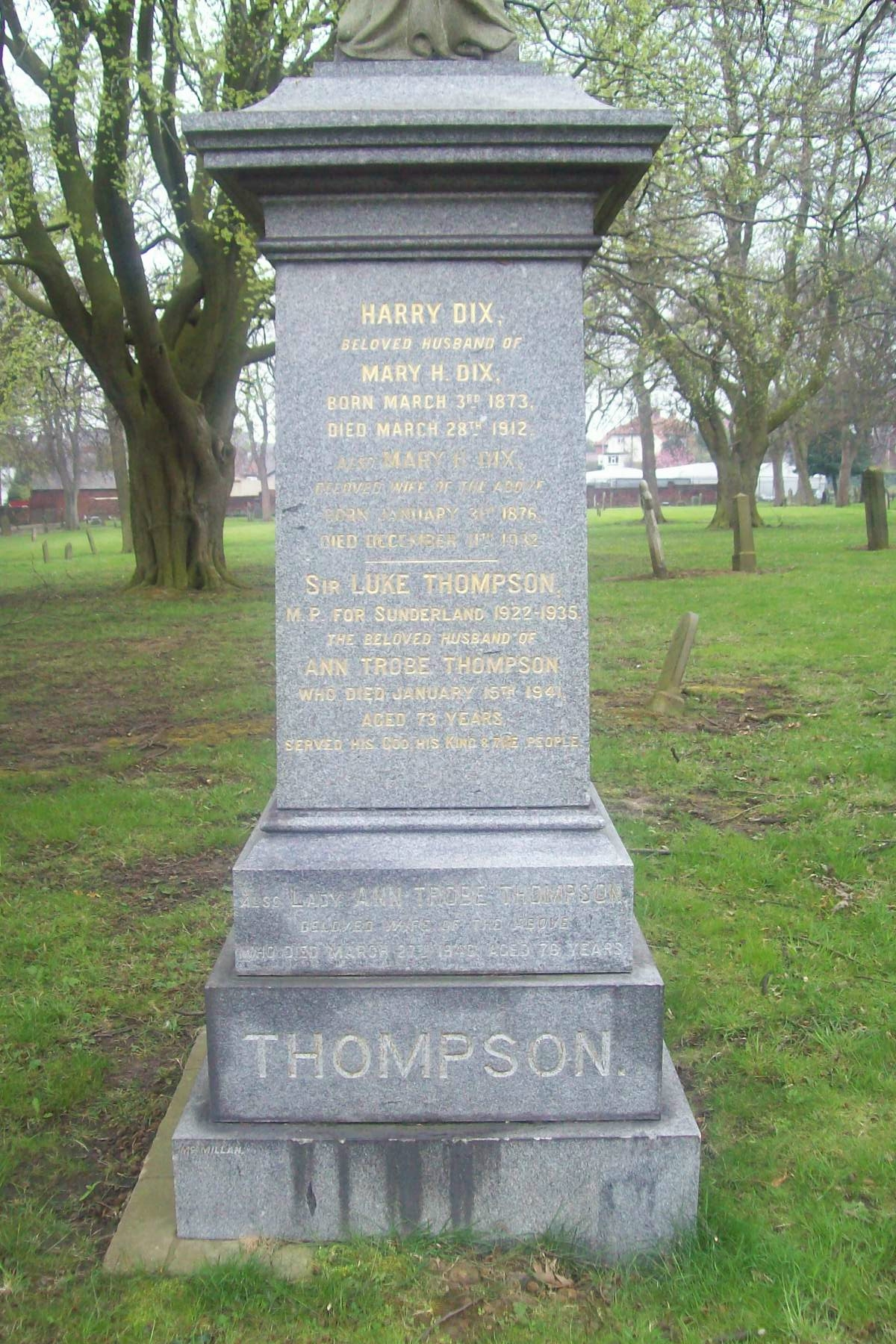
Grave of Sir Luke and Lady Thompson.

== Early life ==
Thompson was born on Chester Road, Bishopwearmouth, the son of John Thompson (1823–1883), a coal merchant, and his wife, Catherine (née Liddell, 1826–1915). After schooling, he became a ship's draughtsman before entering into the coal trade.

== Politics ==
In the general election of 1922, Thompson was elected Member of Parliament for the two-seat constituency of Sunderland, alongside Walter Raine. Both were defeated by the Labour politicians Marion Phillips and Alfred Smith in the general election of 1929, Thompson regained the seat in a by-election in 1931, following Smith's death. He then held the seat alongside Phillips, briefly, and then with Samuel Storey. Retaining the seat after the general election of 1931, he sat until the general election of 1935 when he retired.

Thompson was knighted by George V in 1934.

== Death ==
Thompson was accidentally killed on 15 January 1941 in Sunderland, aged 73, according to Sir Cuthbert Headlam, Bart. after "trying to work a winch and [getting] caught up in the machinery." He was buried in Bishopwearmouth Cemetery with his wife's parents and siblings.

== Family ==
On 19 October 1895, Thompson married Ann Trobe Potts (1869–1946) at Fawcett Street chapel, Sunderland. They had two daughters, Dorothy Trobe (1896–1971) and Catherine (1900–1956).

Parliament of the United Kingdom
| Preceded by Hamar Greenwood and Ralph Hudson | Member of Parliament for Sunderland; 1922–1929; With: Walter Raine | Succeeded by Marion Phillips and Alfred Smith |
| Preceded by Marion Phillips and Alfred Smith | Member of Parliament for Sunderland; 1931–1935; With: Marion Phillips, 1931; Samuel Storey 1931–1935 | Succeeded by Samuel Storey and Stephen Furness |
Non-profit organization positions
| Preceded by Alexander Cameron | President of the Rotary Club of Sunderland; 1925–1928 | Succeeded by Martin Laverick |
Notes and references
1. Rotary Club of Sunderland, accessed 4 May 2008
