= Thomas Glaholm =

Thomas Glaholm (1834-1888) was the son of a Newcastle steam flour miller. He went on to open a successful rope manufacturing plant in Sunderland and was a founder member of a daily provincial newspaper, the Sunderland Echo.

== Early life ==
Thomas Glaholm, the son of steam flour miller Thomas Glaholm, was born in Gateshead in December 1834. He moved to Sunderland in 1857 and began the Hendon Patent Ropery with his brother-in-law, Samuel Sinclair Robson.

== Business life ==
The Glaholm and Robson manufacturing plant quickly proved a success and, in the mid-1860s, it employed a young Samuel Storey as a travelling salesman. Glaholm and Storey shared the same Radical and Liberal ideals and, some 10 years later, they went on to become two of the founding members of the Sunderland Echo newspaper.

Glaholm was also involved in several other businesses, including the Wreath Quay Forge, the Wear Pottery at Southwick, Sunderland, and the Phoenix Iron Foundry in Coronation Street, Sunderland. He eventually retired from the Hendon Ropery in 1878.

== Political life ==
Glaholm was a Liberal who served as a councillor on Sunderland Town Council from 1863 to 1878, spending time as chairman of the Finance Committee. Glaholm and Storey also brought the unsuccessful Liberal petition against George Elliot's return as MP for North Durham, following the North Durham by-election of 1874.

== Personal life ==
Glaholm died unmarried. He was survived by three sisters; Mrs Robson, Mrs Reid and Mrs Clarke. Glaholm had retained a quarter share in the Sunderland Echo when it was formed into a company after the break-up of the Carnegie-Storey syndicate in 1885, and his shares passed to his sisters.
