= Knott baronets =

Extinct baronetcy in the Baronetage of the United Kingdom

The Knott Baronetcy, of Close House in the Parish of Heddon-on-the-Wall in the County of Northumberland, was a title in the Baronetage of the United Kingdom. It was created on 4 July 1917 for the shipping magnate and Conservative politician James Knott. The title became extinct on the death of the second Baronet in 1949.

== Knott baronets, of Close House (1917) ==
- Sir James Knott, 1st Baronet (1855–1934)
- Sir Thomas Garbutt Knott, 2nd Baronet (1879–1949)
