= William Thompson (1792–1854) =

English businessman and MP

William Thompson (baptised 23 January 1792 – 10 March 1854) was an English businessman who was Lord Mayor of London and Member of Parliament.

== Life ==
Baptised on 23 January 1792, he was the son of James Thompson of Grayrigg, Kendal, Westmorland, and was educated at Charterhouse School.

He moved to London as an iron merchant and by 1800 was senior partner in the firm of Thompson, Forman and Homfray of Bankside, which had interests in iron manufacturing. He became master of the Ironmongers' Company in 1829 and 1841 and was elected an Alderman for life in 1821, Sheriff of the City of London for 1822–1823 and Lord Mayor of London for 1828–29.

He served as Chairman of Lloyd's of London (1826–33), treasurer (1826–29), vice-president (1829–43) and president (1843–54) of the Honourable Artillery Company and a director of the Bank of England from 1827 to his death. Other public offices included treasurer of King's College, London (1828 to his death), president of Christ's Hospital (1829 to his death), trustee of the Patriotic Fund (1833 to his death) and deputy-chairman (1848–51) and chairman (1851 to his death) of the Saint Katharine Dock Company.

In 1820 he was elected to serve successively as MP for Callington and MP for London (until 1832). He then represented Sunderland (1833–41) and Westmorland (1841–54).

He also served as Lieutenant-Colonel of the Royal London Militia (1835–51) and Colonel from 1851 to his death.

He had married Amelia, the daughter of ironmaster Samuel Homfray of Merthyr Tydfil, Glamorgan and had one daughter. He died on 10 March 1854.
