= Marion Phillips =

Australian-born British politician (1881–1932)

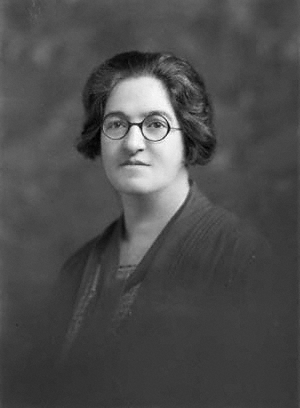

Member of Parliament for Sunderland
- In office 30 May 1929 – 26 October 1931 Serving with Alfred Smith, to March 1931; Luke Thompson, from March 1931
- Prime Minister: Stanley Baldwin; Ramsay MacDonald
- Preceded by: Luke Thompson and Walter Raine
- Succeeded by: Luke Thompson and Samuel Storey

Personal details
- Born: 29 October 1881 St Kilda, Victoria, Australia
- Died: 23 January 1932 (aged 50) London, England
- Party: Labour

Marion Phillips (29 October 1881 – 23 January 1932) was an Australian-born British Labour Party politician who served as a member of the British Parliament (MP) from 1929 to 1931.

== Early life and education ==
Marion Phillips was born on 29 October 1881 in St Kilda, a suburb of Melbourne, Victoria, in colonial Australia. Her parents were Philip David Phillips, Jewish Australian lawyer, and Rose Asher, who was from New Zealand. She was educated at the Presbyterian Ladies' College, Melbourne and University of Melbourne, graduating in 1903.

In 1904, she began a research scholarship at the London School of Economics, graduating as a Doctor of Science in 1907, with a thesis about the development of New South Wales. Between 1906 and 1910, she worked under the direction of Beatrice Webb on a commission investigating the Poor Laws.

== Career ==
A member of the Women's Labour League from 1908, she became its secretary in 1912. She also edited the League's leaflet, which by 1913 became Labour Woman. When World War I broke out she became a member of the War Emergency Workers' National Committee. In 1916, Phillips was present at the formation of the Standing Joint Committee of Industrial Women's Organisations. Phillips was its secretary between 1917 and 1932.

Phillips also served on a number of government committees before any woman had been elected to the country's parliament. The most significant were the Consumer Council of the Ministry of Food, and the Women's Advisory Committee of the Ministry of Reconstruction.

Unlike prominent suffragettes, her vision was not concentrated upon extending the franchise. She wanted state interventions in the free market to be better informed by considerations of life outside the workplace. As a leader of the Women's Labour League, she described its role as "keeping the Labour Party well informed of the needs of women and providing women with the means of becoming educated in political matters". In that endeavour she provoked about a quarter of a million housewives to take part in the labour movement, and helped popularise issues such as equality for women in the workplace, school meals, clinics and play spaces for children, the fundamental value of mothering, a more humanitarian, safety-conscious, approach to the design of homes for ordinary families, and an eradication of needless drudgery and squalor from home life.

Together with Margaret Bondfield, Phillips "worked tirelessly within the WLL to raise the political consciousness of women and encourage their participation." It has been noted of Phillips and Bondfield that "although there was some tension between the two at the start, they eventually worked in harmony and shared an essentially social class based approach to women's emancipation and both were later Labour MPs together in 1929 (Bondfield having briefly been an MP in 1924)."

Speaking on the need for adequate bathing and washing facilities in new housing projects, Phillips remarked: "If Labour councillors will not support us on this demand, we shall have to cry a halt on all municipal housing until we have replaced all Labour men by Labour women". Addressing women in Hartlepool, she emphasised, "There is still a lot of educating to do and we are going to begin by educating ourselves".

As Chief Woman Officer of the Labour Party, she reportedly gave women extra confidence to engage in politics and, by 1925, the Women's Section was firmly established.

At the 1929 general election, Phillips was elected as Member of Parliament (MP) for Sunderland. The 1929"'flapper election" was the first in which women under the age of 30 were eligible to vote. In July 1928, Phillips wrote to all women in the Sunderland constituency, stating that 'FOR WOMEN ESPECIALLY, THIS NEXT ELECTION WHICH WILL TAKE PLACE IN 1929 IS VERY IMPORTANT'. She lost the 1931 election, and died of stomach cancer a year later, aged 50. Phillips was the first Jewish, and thus first non-Christian woman MP. Nonetheless, she was also an atheist.

In September 2019, a plaque was unveiled at 18 Foyle Street, the site of the Sunderland Labour Party's former Committee Rooms. It reads "Sunderland's first woman MP had an office here 1929-1931. Activist and academic, she lobbied for the rights of woman and working people. The Labour Party's Chief Woman Officer (1918-1932)".

== Sources ==
- Leigh Rayment's Historical List of MPs

Party political offices
Preceded by Margaret Bondfield	Secretary of the Women's Labour League; 1913–1918	Succeeded by Organisation dissolved
Preceded by New position	Labour Party Chief Women's Officer; 1919–1932	Succeeded by Mary Sutherland
Parliament of the United Kingdom
Preceded by Luke Thompson and Sir Walter Raine	Member of Parliament for Sunderland; 1929–1931; With: Alfred Smith, to March 1931; Luke Thompson, from March 1931	Succeeded by Luke Thompson and Samuel Storey
