= David Baxter Lawley =

British trade unionist (1888–1964)

David Baxter Lawley (1888–1964) was a British trade unionist and political activist, best known as an activist for the rights of blind people.

Born in Askham-in-Furness, Lawley received an elementary education before becoming a miner. Keen to further himself, he studied mining at evening classes and worked at a wide variety of mines in the UK and also in the United States. He also became an advocate of socialism and an active trade unionist.

In 1912, Lawley moved to Hedley, British Columbia, where he again worked as a miner. In December 1913, he was blinded by a dynamite explosion, and subsequently returned to the UK. Becoming an advocate of the rights of blind people, he joined the National League of the Blind (NLB), and soon became the full-time North West District Organiser for the union. From 1920 to 1922, he served as the union's general president.

Lawley was also active in the Independent Labour Party, serving on the executive of his local branch and speaking on its behalf. At the 1922 United Kingdom general election, the NLB sponsored him as a Labour Party candidate in Sunderland. He took fourth place, with only 12.2% of the vote, and was not elected, and dropped to fifth place and 11.6% when he stood again in 1923. He stood instead in Shrewsbury at the 1924 United Kingdom general election, managing only 6.8% of the votes cast.

By 1932, Lawley had moved to Ontario, where he began working for the CNIB. He was very active in organising local districts and representing them at the provincial level, and in 1936 the post of Ontario Field Service Department supervisor was created for him. He became the organisation's national field service consultant in 1946, and in 1947 and 1948 worked on secondment to the Trinidad and Tobago Blind Welfare Association. Returning to Canada, he became acting superintendent of the CNIB's Ontario division, retiring in 1956.

Trade union offices
Preceded by Ben Purse	General President of the National League of the Blind; 1920–1922	Succeeded by Alec Henderson
