= Theodore Doxford =

British politician

Sir William Theodore Doxford

Member of Parliament for Sunderland
- In office 1895–1906
- Preceded by: Samuel Storey
- Succeeded by: James Stuart

Personal details
- Born: 1 February 1841 Bishopwearmouth, County Durham, England
- Died: 1 October 1916 (aged 74) Grindon, County Durham, England
- Party: Liberal
- Education: Bramham College
- Occupation: Shipowner

Sir William Theodore Doxford DL (1 February 1841 – 1 October 1916) was a British shipbuilder and politician.

== Early life ==
Doxford was born at Bridge Street (leading to Wearmouth Bridge) in Bishopwearmouth, County Durham, on 1 February 1841. He was the eldest son of the eight surviving children of William Doxford (1812–1882) and his wife, Hannah Pile Doxford (1814–1895). He was baptised on 14 March 1841 in St Michaels, Bishopwearmouth (now the Sunderland Minster).

After graduating from Bramham College in the West Riding of Yorkshire in 1857, Doxford began to work at his father's company, William Doxford & Sons, upon its creation in 1858 at its new headquarters at Pallion on the River Wear.

== Family ==
On 9 April 1863, Doxford married Margaret Wilkinson (1842–1916), daughter of Richard Wilkinson, a local shipbuilder. They eventually had nine children, six of whom survived to adulthood:

- Margaret Eveline (1864–1960), married John Hunt Hedley (1858–1914), a valuer.
- William Theodore (1866–1870)
- (Albert) Ernest (1867–1937), a marine engine builder; married Bertha Eleanor Warner (1866–1949).
- Harold (1869–1869)
- Mary Hannah (1870–1948), married Alfred Octavius Hedley (1861–1926; brother of the above John Hunt Hedley), a solicitor.
- Theodore (1874–1876)
- Norah (1876–1965), married (Andrew Leyland) Hillyar Cleland (1868–1943), son of John Cleland of Stormont Castle.
- (Annie) Greta (1878–1968), died unmarried.
- (Wilhelmine) Vera (1883–1955), married Stanley Miller Thompson (1883–1948), creator of The Silver Line.

== Politics ==
After several years of success in his shipbuilding company (held jointly by him and his brothers since their father's death in 1882), Doxford became the first Conservative in forty years to be elected for the two-seat constituency of Sunderland, when he became a Unionist Member of Parliament in 1895. Knighted for his services by Queen Victoria at Osborne House on 9 February 1900, he retired from parliament in 1906. He was also present at Gladstone's funeral service at Westminster Abbey in 1898.

Doxford had also been involved in local affairs, serving on Sunderland town council, as a River Wear commissioner and as a magistrate for Sunderland and County Durham. He was also a Deputy Lieutenant for County Durham from 1896 and was a founding member and second president of the North-East Coast Institution of Engineers and Shipbuilders.

Joining the Institution of Naval Architects in 1878, he was elected a council member in 1896 and became vice-president in 1908. He also represented Wearside on the National Federation of Shipbuilding Employers and was chairman of the Wear Shipbuilders' Association from 1908 to 1912.

== Death ==
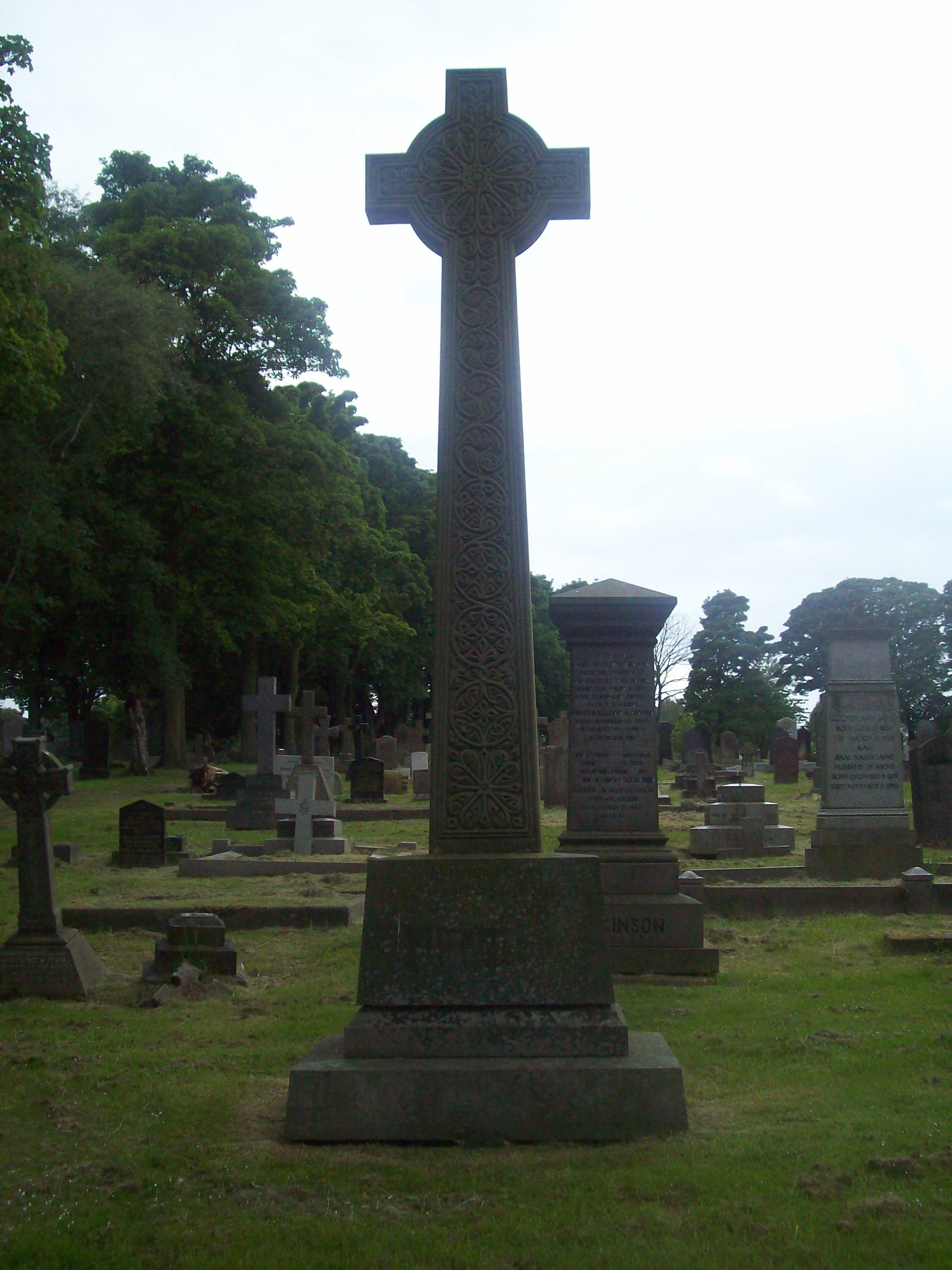
The grave of Theodore and Margaret Doxford.

Doxford died on 1 October 1916, aged 74, at his home, Grindon Hall, a few months after the death of his wife. He was buried with his wife in Bishopwearmouth Cemetery.

Parliament of the United Kingdom
Preceded by Edward Temperley Gourley and Samuel Storey	Member of Parliament for Sunderland; 1895–1906; With: Edward Temperley Gourley 1895–1900; John Stapylton Grey Pemberton 1900–1906	Succeeded by James Stuart and Thomas Summerbell
