= Thomas Summerbell =

Thomas Summerbell (10 August 1861 – 10 February 1910) was an early British Labour Party Member of Parliament.

Born at Seaham Harbour in County Durham, Summerball worked from the age of twelve in a variety of jobs before becoming an apprentice printer with the Seaham Weekly News. He was laid off at the end of his apprenticeship, and moved to Felling, Jarrow, South Shields and finally Sunderland to find work. There, he worked for the Daily Post before starting his own printing firm.

Summerbell was active in the Typographical Association and became a supporter of Joseph Cowen. He was also involved with Sunderland Trades Council, of which he was secretary from 1888, and was a founder of the Tyneside and District Labourers Union. Initially a supporter of the Liberal Party, he was elected to Sunderland Borough Council in 1892, remaining a member until his death. In this role, his major achievement was arranging the municipalisation of the tramways and subsequently electrifying the system. Around the mid-1890s, he became a socialist and joined the Independent Labour Party (ILP). He was also the secretary of the National League of the Blind and was active in the Foresters' Friendly Society.

At the 1906 general election, Summerbell was elected for the Labour Representation Committee in Sunderland, with the support of the ILP. Although there were two MPs for the town, he took up the entirety of local issues, and also became known for his interest in reforms to the indentured labour system in the West Indies. Work in Trinidad contributed to his campaign for the renamed Labour Party at the January 1910 general election, but he lost his seat. He died suddenly the following month during a council meeting.

Parliament of the United Kingdom
Preceded by Theodore Doxford; John Stapylton Grey Pemberton	Member of Parliament for Sunderland; 1906 – January 1910; With: James Stuart	Succeeded by Samuel Storey; James Knott
