= Andrew White (MP) =

Andrew White (22 January 1792 – 3 October 1856) was a British businessperson and politician.

== Life ==
He was the son of John White (1764–1833) and his wife Jane Young. Born in Bishopwearmouth, he followed his father in becoming a shipowner, also owning coal mines and iron and glass factories. He became a magistrate for Sunderland and County Durham, chair of the directors of the Sunderland Joint Stock Bank, chair of the Sunderland Board of Guardians, a director of the Durham and Sunderland Railway, a commissioner of the River Wear and of Sunderland Bridge. He was president of the Sunderland Mechanics' Institute, and of the town's British and Foreign School for Boys.

A supporter of the Whigs, White was elected as the first Mayor of Sunderland. He left that office to stand in the 1837 UK general election in Sunderland, winning the seat. In Parliament, he supported shorter terms between general elections, the secret ballot, extension of the electoral franchise to all ratepayers, and for a national education system on ecumenical principles. He opposed flogging in the armed forces. He stood down at the 1841 UK general election.
