= Sir James Knott, 1st Baronet =

British shipping magnate and politician (1855–1934)

Sir James Knott Bt

Member of Parliament for Sunderland
- In office January 1910 – December 1910 Serving with Samuel Storey
- Preceded by: James Stuart
- Succeeded by: Sir Frank Goldstone

Personal details
- Born: 31 January 1855 Howdon, Northumberland
- Died: 8 June 1934 (aged 79)
- Party: Conservative
- Spouse(s): Margaret Annie Garbutt (m. 1878, d. 1929); Elizabeth Chystie Gauntlett (m. 1932)
- Children: Thomas Garbutt; James Leadbitter (d. 1916); Henry Basil (d. 1915)
- Occupation: shipbroker and ship-owner

Sir James Knott, 1st Baronet (31 January 1855 – 8 June 1934) was a shipping magnate and Conservative Party politician in northeast England.

== Family ==
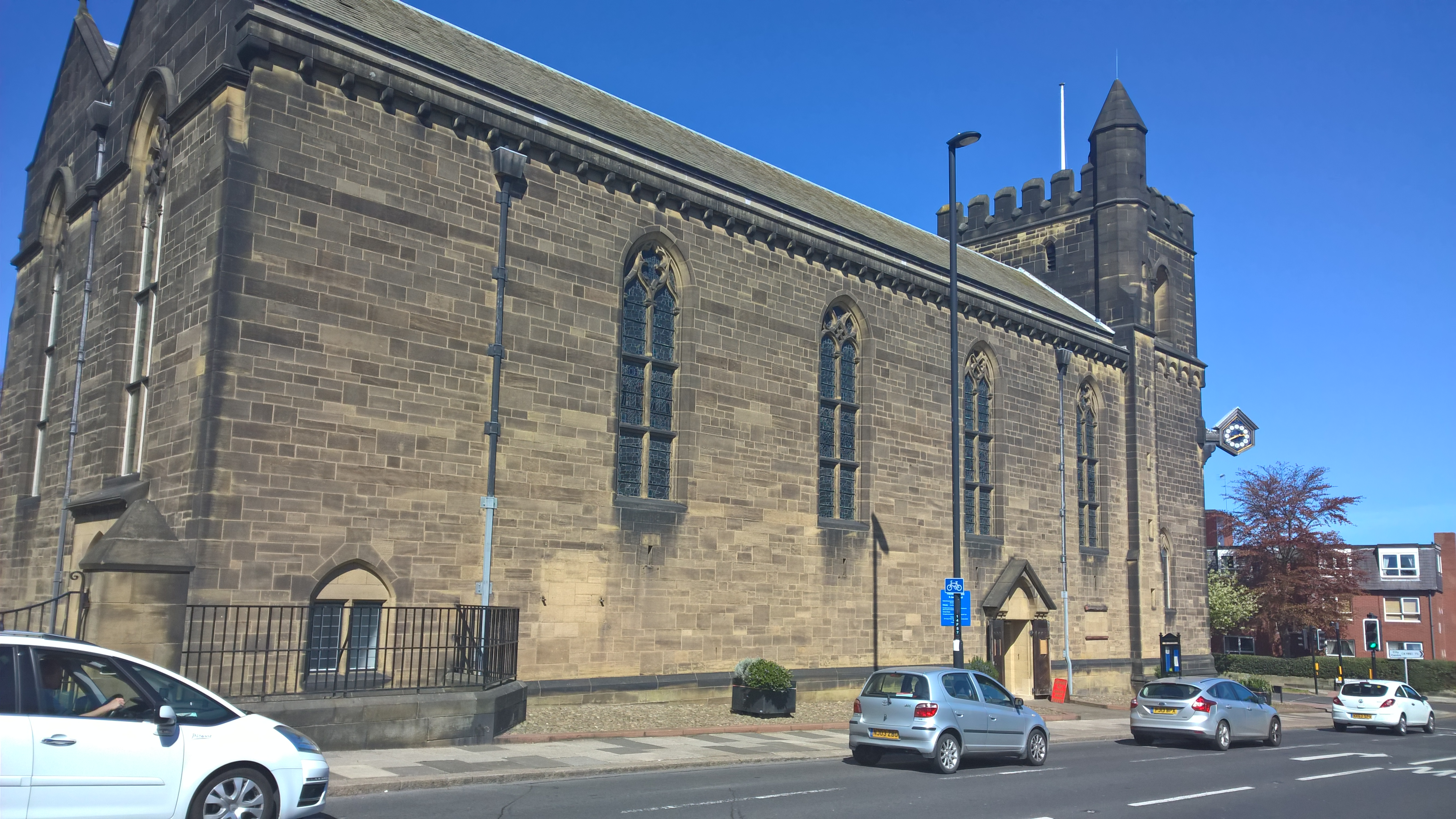
Knott funded the parish church of SS James and Basil, in Fenham in Newcastle upon Tyne, in memory of his sons of the same names.

In 1878 Knott married Margaret Garbutt. They had three sons: Thomas Garbutt Knott, James Leadbitter Knott and Henry Basil Knott.

All three sons served in the British Army in the First World War. Basil Knott was a captain in the Northumberland Fusiliers, and was killed at Ypres on 7 September 1915. James Knott was a major in the West Yorkshire Regiment, was awarded the DSO, and was killed on the first day of the Battle of the Somme, 1 July 1916. The brothers are buried side by side in Ypres Reservoir Cemetery.

Thomas Knott was reported missing in the Gallipoli campaign in 1915. He survived as a prisoner of war, and in 1934 succeeded his father as Second Baronet. Thomas was married in 1925 but died childless in 1949.

In 1929 Lady Margaret died, and in 1932 Knott married Elizabeth Gauntlet.

== Business career ==
Knott's father had been a customs officer and became a publican. Knott was the eldest of ten children. He was brought up in Newcastle upon Tyne. At 13 years old Knott began work in the office of a shipbroker on Newcastle Quay. After six years he left his employer to work as a shipbroker on his own account.

At the age of 23 Knott borrowed £185 and bought a quarter share in Pearl, a collier brig. From this start he built up a fleet of 32 old brigs from which he made great profits carrying coal.

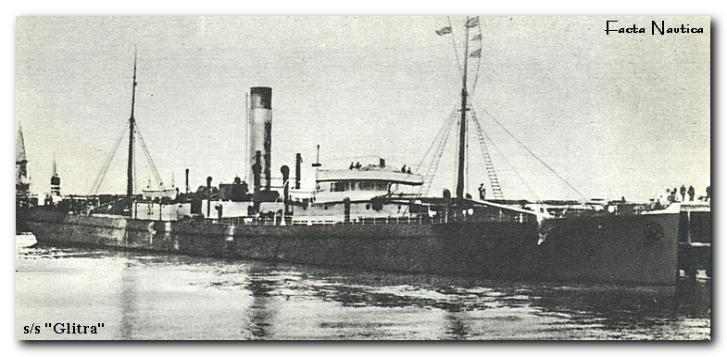
Knott's first steamship, Saxon Prince

Knott's first steamship, Saxon Prince, was built in 1881, and he sold his last sailing ship in 1887. In 1884 Knott founded the Prince Steam Shipping Co Ltd. In 1895 he restructured his business as Prince Line (1895) Ltd with a fleet of 14 steamships.

In 1899 Knott bought the Togston Colliery. He also formed the Acklington Coal Company and was part-owner of the Welsh Primrose Coal Company. Knott was also a qualified master mariner. He was called to the bar in 1899 and practised law at Gray's Inn for four years.

When the First World War began in 1914, Prince Line had 42 ships. By 1916 the company had lost four of these to enemy action.

Knott's heir apparent, Thomas, did not take a great interest in his father's business. The second son, James, had been its deputy managing director. The third son, Basil, had managed the company's coal interests. Having lost James and Basil, and with Thomas' fate uncertain, in August 1916 Knott sold Prince Line to Furness, Withy & Co Ltd for £3 million.

== Political career ==
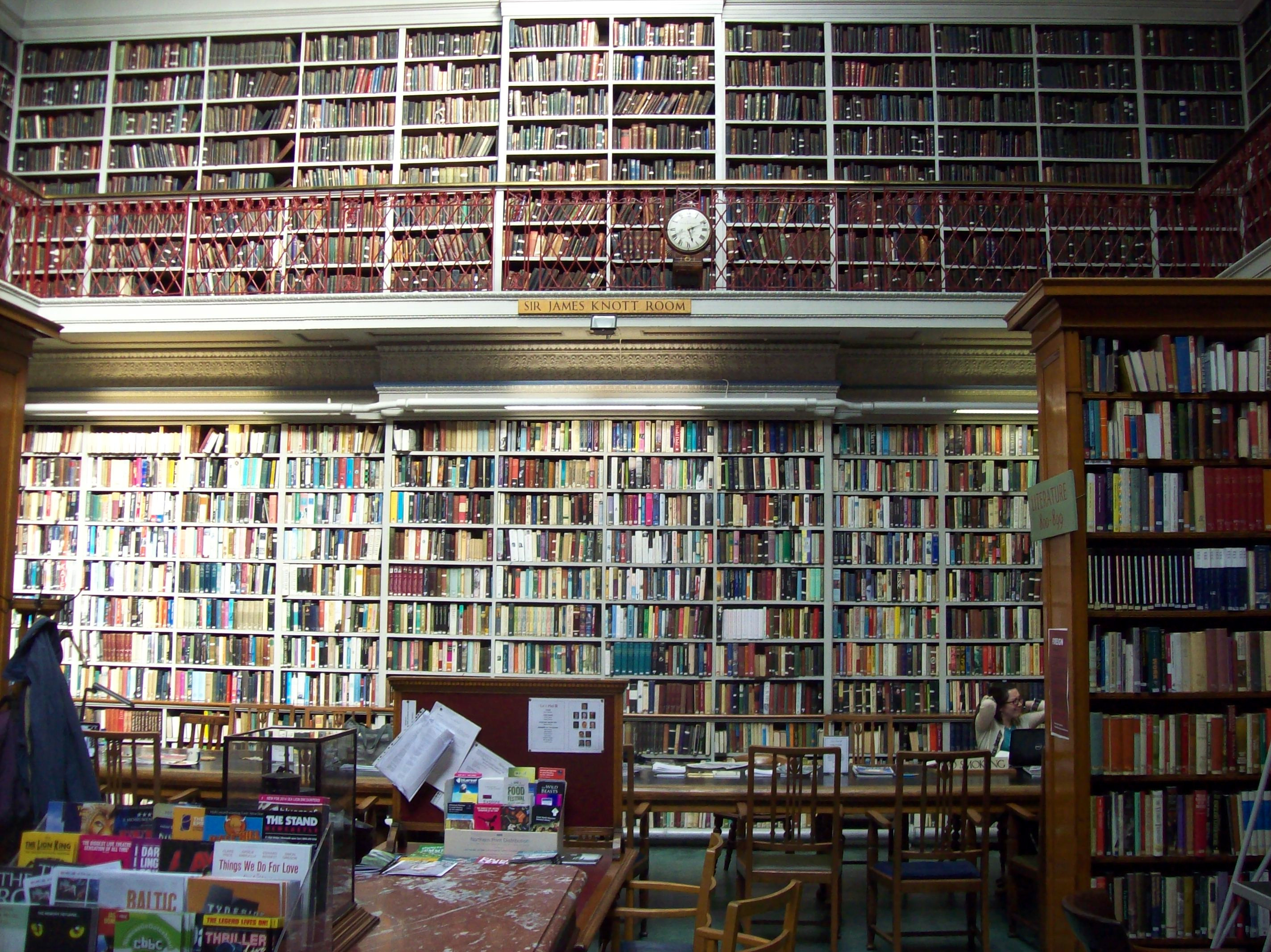
The room which commemorates Sir James in the Literary and Philosophical Society building, Newcastle upon Tyne

Knott was an unsuccessful candidate for the Conservative Party at the 1906 general election in the Tyneside division of Northumberland.

At the January 1910 general election he was elected as Member of Parliament (MP) for the two-seat constituency of Sunderland, along with Samuel Storey (who had been MP for the constituency from 1881 to 1895). Storey was an "Independent Tariff Reform" candidate (i.e. opposed to free trade), but his candidacy had the full support of the local Conservative association and his return of election expenses was made jointly with Knott, who was the official Conservative candidate. They both stood down because of ill-health at the general election in December 1910.

He was made a baronet in 1917, of Close House, Heddon-on-the-Wall, Northumberland.

== Samarès Manor ==
In 1924 Knott moved to Jersey, bought Samarès Manor and became the Seigneur of Samarès.

== Death duties ==
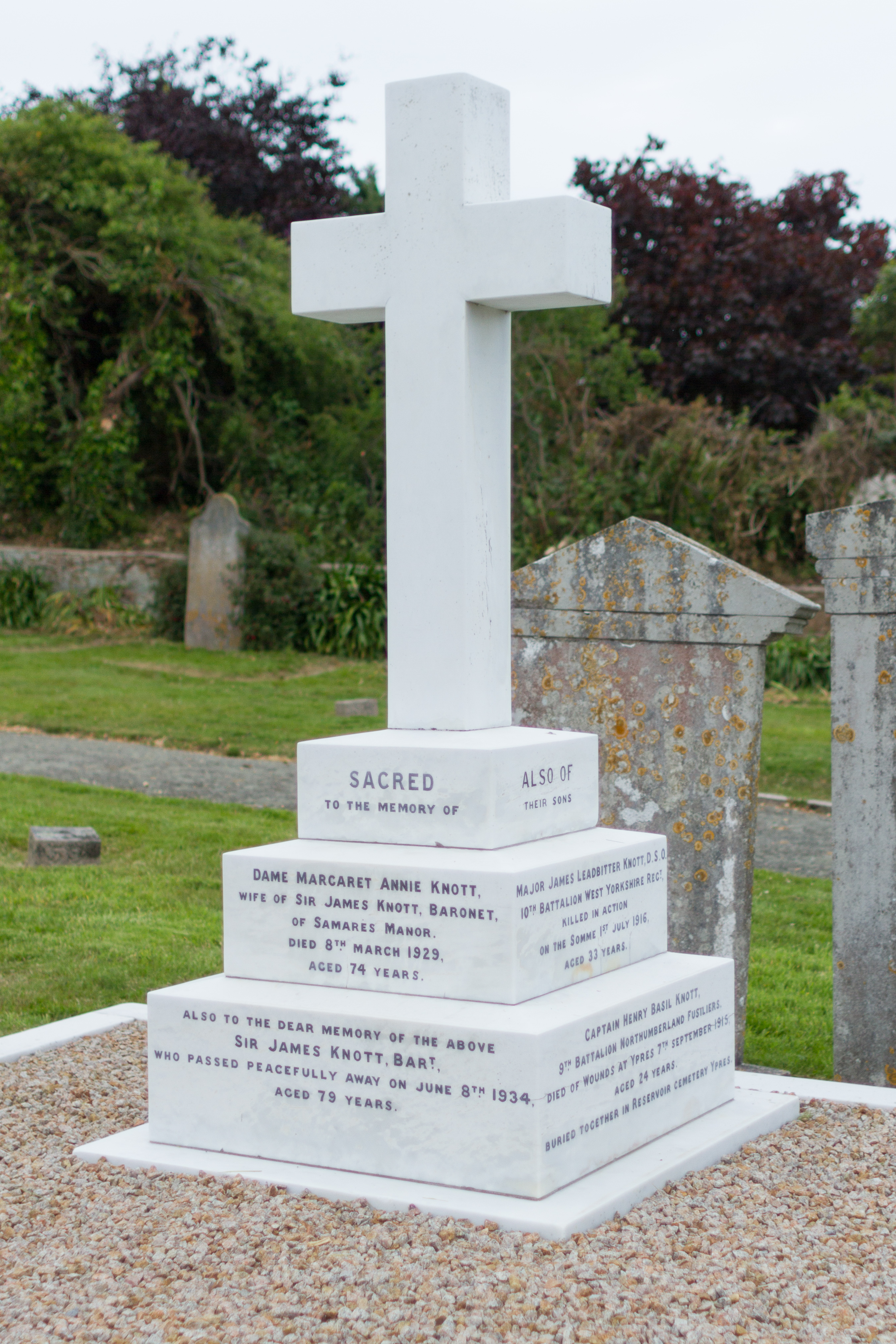
Knott family gravestone in the churchyard in St Clement, Jersey

On 13 November 1934, John Stourton, MP for Salford South, asked the Chancellor of the Exchequer, Neville Chamberlain, whether an agreement had been reached over payment of death duties on Knott's £5m estate. Chamberlain replied that he "was not prepared to disclose information as to the position in regard to taxation in a particular case."

== Legacy ==
Several institutions in northeast England are named after Knott, including the Knott Memorial Hall in Heddon-on-the-Wall.

== Bibliography ==
- Burrell, David (1992). Furness Withy 1891–1991. Kendal: World Ship Society. ISBN 0-905617-70-3.
- Craig, F. W. S. (1989) [1974]. British parliamentary election results 1885–1918 (2nd ed.). Chichester: Parliamentary Research Services. ISBN 0-900178-27-2.

Parliament of the United Kingdom
Preceded by Thomas Summerbell; James Stuart	Member of Parliament for Sunderland; January 1910 – December 1910; With: Samuel Storey	Succeeded by Frank Goldstone; Sir Hamar Greenwood, Bt
Baronetage of the United Kingdom
New creation	Baronet (of Close House, Northumberland); 1917–1934	Succeeded by Thomas Garbutt Knott
