= Edward Temperley Gourley =

English coal fitter, shipowner, and politician (1826–1902)

Sir Edward Temperley Gourley

Sunderland
- In office 1868–1900
- Preceded by: James Hartley
- Succeeded by: John Pemberton

Personal details
- Born: 8 June 1826 Sunderland, County Durham, England
- Died: 15 April 1902
- Party: Liberal
- Occupation: Shipowner, politician

Sir Edward Temperley Gourley VD (8 June 1826 – 15 April 1902) was a coal fitter, shipowner, and politician born in Sunderland, England. He was knighted for his political work.

== Early life ==
Edward Temperley Gourley - known as E.T. Gourley - was the eldest son of shipowner John Young Gourley and his wife, Mary Temperley. Born on the banks of the River Wear on 8 June 1826, he left school at 13 and served his apprenticeship as a coalfitter with John Halcro.

The Halcro office was one of the largest commercial businesses then in Sunderland and, under the supervision of John Halcro, Gourley acquired the rudiments of business and successful commerce. His job took him to the Netherlands and Germany, where he studied foreign trade, and, after finishing his apprenticeship, he was rewarded with a percentage of the firm's profits.

== Business life ==
At the age of 22, Gourley went into business for himself as a ship-chandler. He was not satisfied, however, with this profession and went on to become a ship owner. His father, John Gourley, joined him in the business, as did his uncle, Edward Temperley. Working from an office in Villiers Street, Gourley expanded his business to include the exportation of coal and the importation of timber. Such was his apitutude for the business that, within a few years, he had acquired several fine ships, which were used in the Indian trade.

The Sunderland Echo later reported: "The Crimean War appears to have afforded him a fine opportunity for developing his business. At that time, when a wretched and niggardly government was starving the Tommy Atkins of that day in the trenches before Sebastopol, Sir Edward had a number of vessels engaged as transports."

Gourley went on an extended Continental tour during this period, visiting Turkey, the Crimea and Spain. It was this journey which persuaded him to favour steamers over sailing ships and, on his return, he invested heavily in steam shipping and became one of the leading shipowners in Sunderland.

1868 brought Gourley a run of bad luck, when he lost several steamers. When the bad luck and disasters continued, the politician Samuel Plimsoll brought serious charges against the "fair fame of Sir Edward" in an appeal on behalf of "Our seamen." These charges were subsequently the subject of investigation in the law courts. But the people of Sunderland, however, backed Gourley over Plimsoll, and voted for him as their MP that same year.

From 1883 to 1892 he was a director of the Imperial Tramways Company and its subsidiary the Corris Railway.

After entering Parliament, Gourley retired from the active management of his business, but always kept at least a few ships of his own. He was also a large shareholder in steamers and this interest in shipping remained with him until his death in 1902.

== Political life ==
Gourley first took an active interest in politics in 1857, when he became a town councillor. It was a role he was to continue until 1865, just three years before he became a Member of Parliament for Sunderland.

The Sunderland Echo reported at the time: "It was his pleasing duty to make his first speech in the local Parliament in moving a resolution, the outcome of which was the Havelock statue, which now stands in Mowbray Park. The services rendered by the great Sir Henry Havelock to this country were a theme which many an orator might covet for his maiden speech, and Sir Edward had the satisfaction of seeing his resolution carried. Sunderland was eager to do honour to her most illustrious son."

Donations for the statue poured in from around the country and, when it was finally erected, Sir Henry's son, Sir Henry Havelock-Allan, paid his first visit to Sunderland and met Gourley. The pair would, just a few years later, jointly represent in Parliament.

As a Town Councillor, Gourley was diligent, energetic and popular. He was "imbued with thoroughly progressive and democratic tastes," according to the Echo. Indeed, such was his popularity among fellow councillors and townspeople that, in 1864, he was unanimously elected Mayor. He was re-elected to the Mayoralty the following year and, in his second term of office, he had to guard the town against rinderpest and cholera. "Under his directing every possible precaution was taken and the result was that a single case of cattle plague occurred in the borough," the Echo reported. "The cholera, which was then raging in Holland, fortunately did not attack Sunderland. Under the Mayor's guidance, the lower parts of the town were cleansed, and these precautionary measures were blessed with success."

Gourley's other political work at this time included being appointed as chief magistrate for Sunderland and working as an Alderman for the town. He was also a shipowners' representative on the River Wear Commission, a borough magistrate, a justice of the peace for the county, and a Deputy-Lieutenant. He also joined forces with Samuel Storey, a Liberal councillor, to become one of the founder members of the Sunderland Echo in 1873.

It was in 1868 that Gourley took his biggest step forward in politics, when he was elected as a Liberal MP for the town. He served in this post until 1900, when he retired, and was an early convert to Home Rule for Ireland.

The Echo reported after his death: "He never lost sight of the fact that he was a representative of a shipping centre, and whenever the opportunity offered his abilities were devoted to the good of that industry. He sought to benefit not only the shipowners, but the sailors, and much of his energy was devoted to the interests of the seafaring class.

"He was probably the most persistent questioner in the House of Commons, and much of his work there consisted in interrogating the Government on points on which he desired information or with the object of exposing an abuse. The subject of the royal yachts was one in which he manifested an especially keen interest, as he did also in the condition of the mercantile marine, in connection with which he constantly impressed the necessity of having the vessels manned as much as possible with Britishers, so that they could be depended upon in the event of war."

Edward Temperley Gourley was knighted in 1895.

== Volunteering ==
Gourley was appointed Lieutenant-Colonel in command of the 3rd (Sunderland Rifles) Durham Rifle Volunteer Corps on 10 November 1865. When he retired from this position he was appointed Honorary Colonel of the unit on 10 July 1869. Most unusually, when his successor resigned he reverted to active command of the battalion in 1873. He retired a second time and was re-appointed Hon Colonel on 19 January 1881. He was awarded the Volunteer Decoration (VD).

== Religious life ==
Gourley was a Congregationalist and, in early life, he attended Bethel Chapel in Villiers Street, conducting a Sunday school there. For several years, he acted as one of the secretaries of the local Sunday School Union and was "often to be found on the platform when the great Sunday school gathering took place." In later life, he was also a keen advocate of temperance and, for some time, he was secretary of the Sunderland Temperance Society.

== Personal life ==
Gourley had one brother, William, and three sisters, Margaret, Mary Jane and Elizabeth. William was a captain in one of his father's boats as a young man, but he later left the North and died at Bournemouth. Of Gourley's sisters, one died unmarried and another married Joseph Lumsden, a Sunderland chain and anchormaker. After her death, Lumsden took her sister for his second wife. Gourley himself remained a bachelor until his death on 15 April 1902. He was a Freemason, being initiated into Palatine Lodge No.97, in Sunderland, on 10 October 1861.

Parliament of the United Kingdom
Preceded by John Candlish and James Hartley	Member of Parliament for Sunderland; 1868–1900; With: John Candlish to 1874; Sir Henry Havelock-Allan 1874–1881; Samuel Storey1881–1895; Theodore Doxford from 1881	Succeeded by Theodore Doxford and John Pemberton
Civic offices
Preceded by James Allison	Mayor of Sunderland; 1864-1866	Succeeded by John James Kayll
Preceded by John James Kayll	Mayor of Sunderland; 1867-1868	Succeeded by John Crossley
