= John Stapylton Grey Pemberton =

British politician

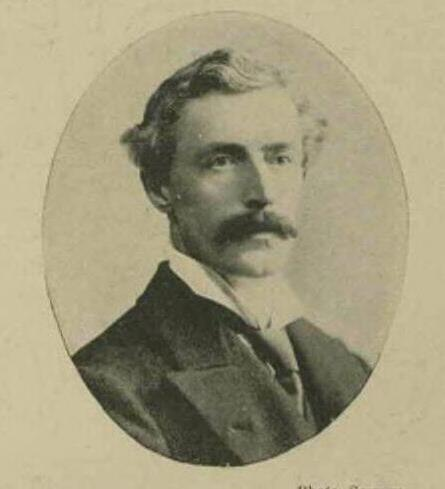

Member of Parliament for Sunderland
- In office 1900–1906
- Preceded by: Edward Temperley Gourley
- Succeeded by: Thomas Summerbell

Vice-Chancellor of the University of Durham
- In office 1918–1920
- Preceded by: William Henry Hadow
- Succeeded by: David Drummond

Personal details
- Born: 23 December 1860
- Died: 22 February 1940 (aged 79) Durham, County Durham
- Party: Conservative
- Education: University of Oxford

John Stapylton Grey Pemberton was Member of Parliament for Sunderland 1900–1906 and Vice-Chancellor of Durham University 1918–1919. He was also President of the Council of Durham Colleges 1911–1937, Recorder for Durham and chair of the Durham Quarter Sessions. He died in 1940 aged 79.

== Early life and education ==
Pemberton was educated at Eton and New College, Oxford, gaining his BA in 1884 and proceeding to an MA in 1888. He won a fellowship at All Souls College, Oxford in 1885 and was called to the bar at the Middle Temple in 1889. In December 1883, shortly before completing his degree, he became a magistrate for County Durham.

== Personal life ==
Pemberton was the eldest son of Richard Lawrence Pemberton and Jane Emma Pemberton (née Stapylton). He married Janet Maud Marshall in 1890 in Llanfairfechan. She died aged 25 in 1892. He married again, to Nira Ross, in 1895.

== Politics ==
Pemberton stood for the Conservatives in Sunderland in 1892 before winning one of the two seats in 1900, along with Theodore Doxford, also Conservative. Both were defeated in the 1906 election, when the seats were split between the Liberals and Labour. In the 1910 election, he broke with his party over free trade and backed the Liberal candidate for Sunderland.

== County and University service ==
In 1911 Pemberton became President of the Council of Durham Colleges, which ran the Durham division of the federal University of Durham, in succession to Bishop George Nickson. He held this position until the changes in the University's constitution in 1937, when a full-time head of the Durham division (the Warden of the Durham Colleges) was appointed.

In 1918 he was appointed Vice-Chancellor of Durham University for a two-year term. In 1924 he became Recorder for Durham City in succession to Sir Francis Greenwell. In 1931 he became chair of the Durham Quarter Sessions, having previously been vice-chair. He served in this role until he stepped down on his 78th birthday, in 1938.

In addition to these, Pemberton also served on Durham County Council and as chair of the governors of Sherburn Hospital. He died at home near Durham in 1940.

Academic offices
| Preceded by Sir William Henry Hadow | Vice-Chancellor & Warden of the University of Durham; 1918 - 1920 | Succeeded by Sir David Drummond |
