= Samuel Storey, Baron Buckton =

British Conservative politician

- Samuel Storey in 1958.

Deputy Speaker of the House of Commons Chairman of Ways and Means
- In office 26 October 1965 – 31 March 1966
- Speaker: Horace King
- Preceded by: Horace King
- Succeeded by: Eric Fletcher

Deputy Chairman of Ways and Means
- In office 3 November 1964 – 26 October 1965
- Speaker: Harry Hylton-Foster
- Preceded by: Robert Grimston
- Succeeded by: Roderic Bowen

Member of Parliament for Stretford
- In office 23 February 1950 – 31 March 1966
- Preceded by: Herschel Austin
- Succeeded by: Ernest Davies

Member of Parliament for Sunderland
- In office 27 October 1931 – 26 July 1945
- Preceded by: Marion Phillips
- Succeeded by: Richard Ewart

Personal details
- Born: Samuel Storey; 18 January 1896
- Died: 17 January 1978 (aged 81)
- Party: Conservative
- Parents: Frederick George Storey (father); Mary Dagmar (mother)
- Education: Haileybury and Imperial Service College
- Alma mater: Trinity College, Cambridge
- Profession: Barrister

Samuel Storey, Baron Buckton (18 January 1896 – 17 January 1978), known as Sir Samuel Storey, 1st Baronet, from 1960 to 1966, was a British Conservative politician.

== Early life and career ==
Storey was the son of Frederick George Storey and his wife Mary Dagmar née Hutton, and was educated at Haileybury and Trinity College, Cambridge. After graduation, he became a barrister in the Inner Temple in 1919 and joined Sunderland Borough Council in 1928.

== Political career ==
He was elected as Member of Parliament (MP) for the Sunderland constituency at the 1931 general election (a post his namesake grandfather had held from 1881 to 1895 and briefly in 1910), and held the seat in the House of Commons until his defeat at the 1945 general election. He joined the East Riding of Yorkshire County Council in 1946.

Storey returned to Parliament at the 1950 general election, when he was elected MP for Stretford and during his tenure was Chairman of the Standing Committees and Temporary Chairman of the Committees of the House of Commons in 1957 and Chairman of the Committee of Ways and Means from 1965–66.

He was created a baronet in February 1960 and, after his defeat at the 1966 general election, he was given a life peerage as Baron Buckton, of Settrington in the East Riding of the County of York.

== Personal life ==
Lord Buckton died in January 1978, aged 81. The life barony became extinct on his death while he was succeeded in the hereditary baronetcy by his son, Richard.

== Arms ==
Coat of arms of Samuel Storey, Baron Buckton
Crest In front of an escallop Or a stork's head erased Sable gorged with a mural crown Gold. Escutcheon Per fess Argent and Sable a pale counterchanged three storks also Sable. Supporters On either side a stork Sable in the beak an escallop Or.

Parliament of the United Kingdom
Preceded by Marion Phillips and Alfred Smith	Member of Parliament for Sunderland; 1931–1945; With: Luke Thompson to 1935; Stephen Furness from 1935	Succeeded by Richard Ewart and Fred Willey
Preceded by Herschel Austin	Member of Parliament for Stretford; 1950–1966	Succeeded by Ernest Davies
Baronetage of the United Kingdom
New creation	Baronet (of Settrington); 1960–1978	Succeeded by Richard Storey
