= Samuel Storey (Liberal politician) =

British politician

The Right Honourable Samuel Storey

Member of Parliament for Sunderland
- In office 1881–1895
- Preceded by: Sir Henry Havelock-Allan, 1st Baronet
- Succeeded by: William Theodore Doxford

Personal details
- Born: 13 January 1841 Sherburn, County Durham, England
- Died: 18 January 1925 (aged 84) Chester-le-Street, County Durham, England
- Party: Liberal
- Occupation: Newspaper proprietor

Samuel Storey (13 January 1841 – 18 January 1925) was a British politician born in County Durham. He became a Member of Parliament for Sunderland and the main founder of the Sunderland Echo newspaper.

== Early life ==
Samuel Storey was born in Sherburn, near Durham, on 13 January 1841. He was the sixth son of County Durham farmer Robert Storey. When Robert died in 1843, his mother moved to Newcastle, where Samuel Storey was educated at St Andrew’s School. He became a pupil-teacher there when he was 13 and then attended Durham Diocesan Training College from 1858 to 1859.

After leaving college, Storey worked as a master at Birtley Church of England School from 1860 to 1864. However, when his mother moved from Newcastle to Monkwearmouth, Sunderland, in around 1858, he became increasingly involved in events in the town, helping to establish Sunderland Working Men's Club in 1863. Storey married Mary Ann Addison, daughter of John Addison of Monkwearmouth, in April 1864. By the end of that year, he moved to Monkwearmouth as well. Following the move, he worked as a traveller for Glaholm and Robson, a rope manufacturer, for three years before setting up on his own as an accountant.

== Business life ==
It was in October 1865 that Storey and Thomas Steel, a Sunderland solicitor, set up the Atlas Building Society. Steel acted as the Society's solicitor, while Storey was its manager. In 1870, Storey succeeded his father-in-law as Actuary of the Monkwearmouth Savings Bank, a post he held until 1876. In the same year, he joined his brother-in-law, J.G. Addison, as a partner in the timber firm, Armstrong, Addison & Co. The 1870s also saw Storey speculate successfully in building land, mostly in the Monkwearmouth and East Boldon areas.

== Political life ==
Storey became involved in local politics from the time he moved to Sunderland. He worked for the Whig candidate, Henry Fenwick, in the 1865 General Election but, the following year, helped to persuade the Radical John Candlish to oppose Fenwick when he had to stand for re-election on taking office. Candlish was successful in the 1866 by-election and, from then on, Storey became increasingly prominent in the Liberal Party in Sunderland. His influence extended to North Durham, too, from 1874, when he helped to found the Sunderland and North Durham Liberal Club. Sunderland Liberal Association followed in 1876.

In 1868, Storey stood unsuccessfully for Sunderland's town council for Monkwearmouth Ward, but a year later he was successful. He remained a councillor for the ward until his election as an Alderman in 1877 and he stayed on the council until he resigned in 1890. During the 1870s, he led a radical revival in the council and was elected mayor in 1876, 1877 and, following the death of T.S. Turnbull in April 1880.

In April 1881, Storey was elected MP for Sunderland at the by-election which followed the resignation of Sir Henry Havelock-Allan. He was re-elected at the General Elections of 1885, 1886 and 1892, but was defeated in 1895. He stood as Liberal candidate for Newcastle in 1900, when he was defeated, and as an Independent Tariff Reformer in Sunderland in the January 1910 election. He was elected this time, but retired at the December 1910 election.

Storey's political opinions were often at variance with his party's. In particular, he advocated Home Rule for Ireland several years before William Ewart Gladstone made this Liberal party policy and Storey's public opposition to Liberal policy on Ireland in 1880 gave the moderate Liberals in Sunderland a chance to prevent his election to Parliament in 1881. In the event, however, the radical wing was strong enough to counter this and secure his unopposed return.

In October 1903, he caused a considerable stir by resigning as Chairman of the Northern Liberal Association in order to become a Tariff Reformer, and he devoted most of his energies in the ensuing decade to that cause. He failed, however, to win the Sunderland Liberal Association over to Tariff Reform in 1904 but, the following year, was a prime mover in the formation of the Northern Tariff Reform Federation. This, he hoped, would bring together men of all shades of political opinion, since he insisted the question was an economic, not a party political, matter.

Storey spoke at meetings all over the country and won the Sunderland seat at the January 1910 election as an Independent Tariff Reform candidate. In the same year, he bought the Newcastle Daily Journal, to help further the Tariff Reform cause in the North - the Tariff Reformers having been deprived of their 'loudest local advocate' when the North Mail was sold to a group of Liberals headed by Sir Christopher Furness in 1906.

Local politics remained a constant interest for Storey too, and he was a member of Durham County Council from 1892 to 1913. He was first elected to the authority as an Alderman in 1892, then as a councillor from 1898 to 1907, and again as an Alderman from 1907 to 1913. He served as vice-chairman of the council from 1892 to 1894 and 1897–1898, and as chairman from 1894 to 1897, and from 1898 to 1905. During this time, his major concerns were sanitary matters and education. Storey's contribution to Sunderland history, both politically and through his newspaper business, was formally recognised when he was presented with the Freedom of Sunderland on 7 October 1921.

== Publishing life ==
Samuel Storey was one of the original seven founders of the Sunderland Echo, a regional daily newspaper which is still published. The first edition of the Echo was printed on 22 December 1873, on a flat-bed press in Press Lane, Sunderland. Five hundred copies of the four-page issue were produced at noon and 4 p.m., and sold for a ha'penny each. Today the Echo is printed on a £12 million full colour press, which was installed at its purpose-built base in Pennywell, Sunderland, in 1996. More than 44,000 tabloid copies are printed each day, which sell for 45p each.

Storey founded the paper to fill a gap in both the newspaper and political markets. Although the 100,000-strong population of Sunderland was served by two weekly newspapers, there were no daily papers, and none at all reflecting the Radical views held by Storey and his partners. He promised readers in the first edition that, if things went wrong, the "Echo would try its best to put them right". But he added: "Always with moderation and without esteeming all those who oppose us as fools and knaves." Early copies of the Echo also included lengthy reports of Liberal meetings, and critical articles on Liberal opponents.

The Sunderland Echo was launched with an initial investment of £3,500, raised by donations of £500 each from Storey and his business partners. Those joining the venture were: Quaker banker Edward Backhouse, shipbroker and MP Edward Temperley Gourley, shipbuilder and MP Charles Palmer, newspaper editor Richard Ruddock, rope-maker Thomas Glaholm and draper Thomas Scott Turnbull. Only Ruddock, however, had any knowledge of newspapers and the money was quickly used up.

Ruddock, Gourley and Palmer withdrew from the venture early on and Storey took over their shares. A further £7,000 in investment enabled the remaining partners to abandon the "wheezing flat-bed press" and, in July 1876, the Echo was moved to a new premises at 14 Bridge Street, Sunderland. Bridge Street was to remain the home of the Echo for the next 100 years and, in 1923, Storey paid a visit to mark the paper's 50th anniversary. He died two years later.

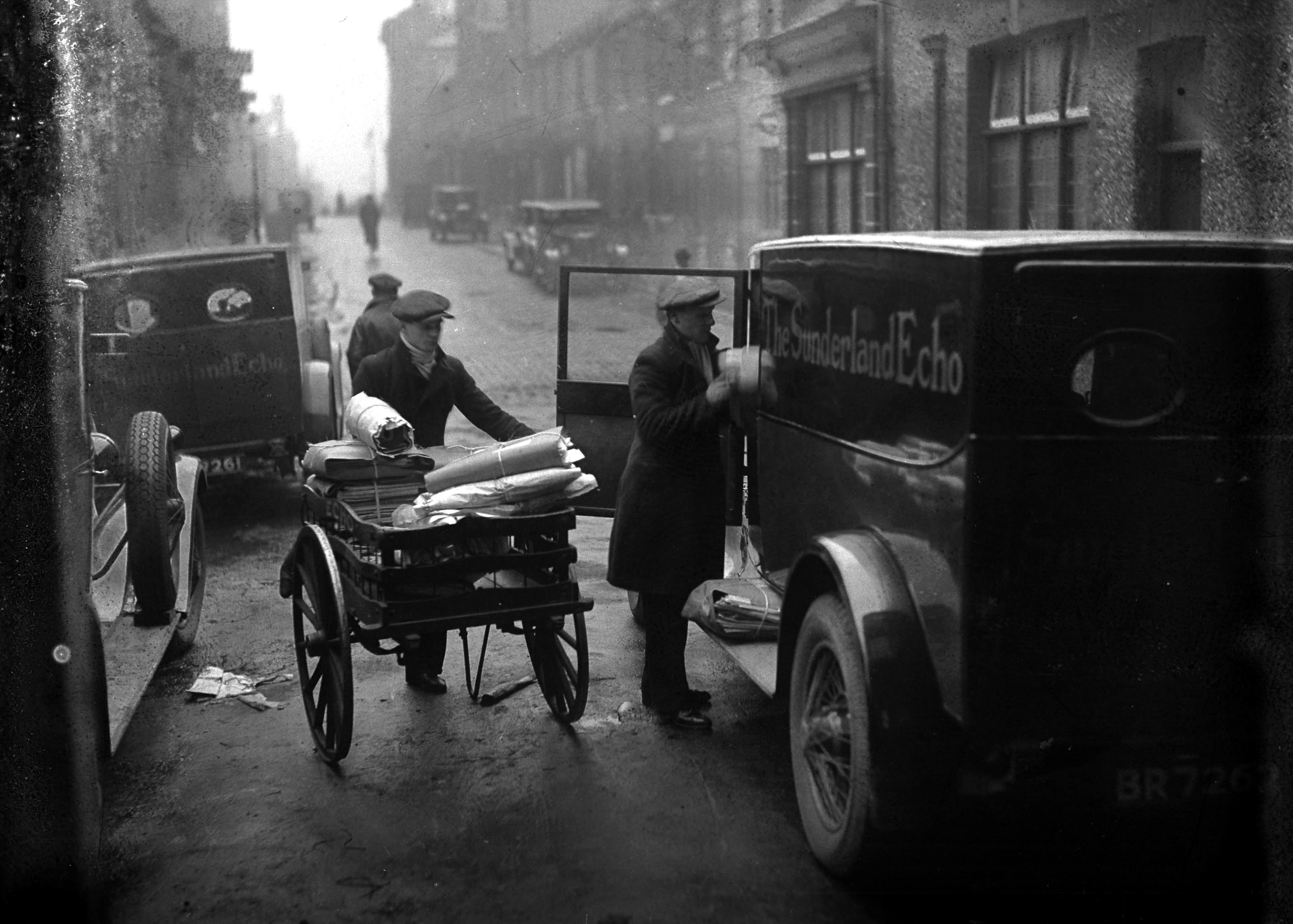
The Echo is placed into delivery vans at the old base in Bridge Street, Sunderland, in the 1930s.

Besides the Sunderland Echo, Storey started the Tyneside Daily Echo in Gateshead in 1879, which was moved to Newcastle in 1880 and discontinued in 1888. But it was a partnership with Andrew Carnegie, from 1882 to 1885, which saw his newspaper business take off. The pair started several new papers and bought up many existing ones. Their chain included the Wolverhampton Express and Wolverhampton Star, which were amalgamated as the Express and Star by the syndicate in 1884. Other papers in their stable were the Hampshire Telegraph, Portsmouth Evening News, The Echo in London and the North Eastern Daily and Weekly Gazettes at Middlesbrough. Two papers which the syndicate tried but failed to buy were the Shields Gazette and the Northern Echo.

One of its last purchases was the Northern Daily Mail, in Hartlepool. When the syndicate broke up in 1885, Storey retained the Northern Daily Mail, the Hampshire Telegraph, the Portsmouth Evening News, and his own Sunderland and Tyneside Echoes. These papers were to become the basis of his new business idea, Portsmouth and Sunderland Newspapers.

== Personal life ==
Samuel Storey died in 1925, aged 84, several months after the death of his eldest son, Frederick George Storey. The chairmanship of his company passed to his grandson, Samuel (the elder son of Frederick Storey), who carried on with his grandfather's political activities too, joining Sunderland Brough Council in 1928 and being elected as the town's MP in the same year, holding this position until 1945.

Parliament of the United Kingdom
Preceded by Sir Henry Havelock-Allan	Member of Parliament for Sunderland; 1881–1895; With: Edward Gourley	Succeeded by Theodore Doxford
Preceded by James Stuart and Thomas Summerbell	Member of Parliament for Sunderland; January 1910–December 1910; With: James Knott	Succeeded by Sir Hamar Greenwood and Frank Goldstone
Civic offices
Preceded by John Nicholson	Mayor of Sunderland; 1876-1878	Succeeded by Samuel Sinclair Robson
Preceded by Thomas Scott Turnbull	Mayor of Sunderland; 1880	Succeeded by William Wilson
