= Ralph Milbanke Hudson =

English shipowner and politician (1849–1938)

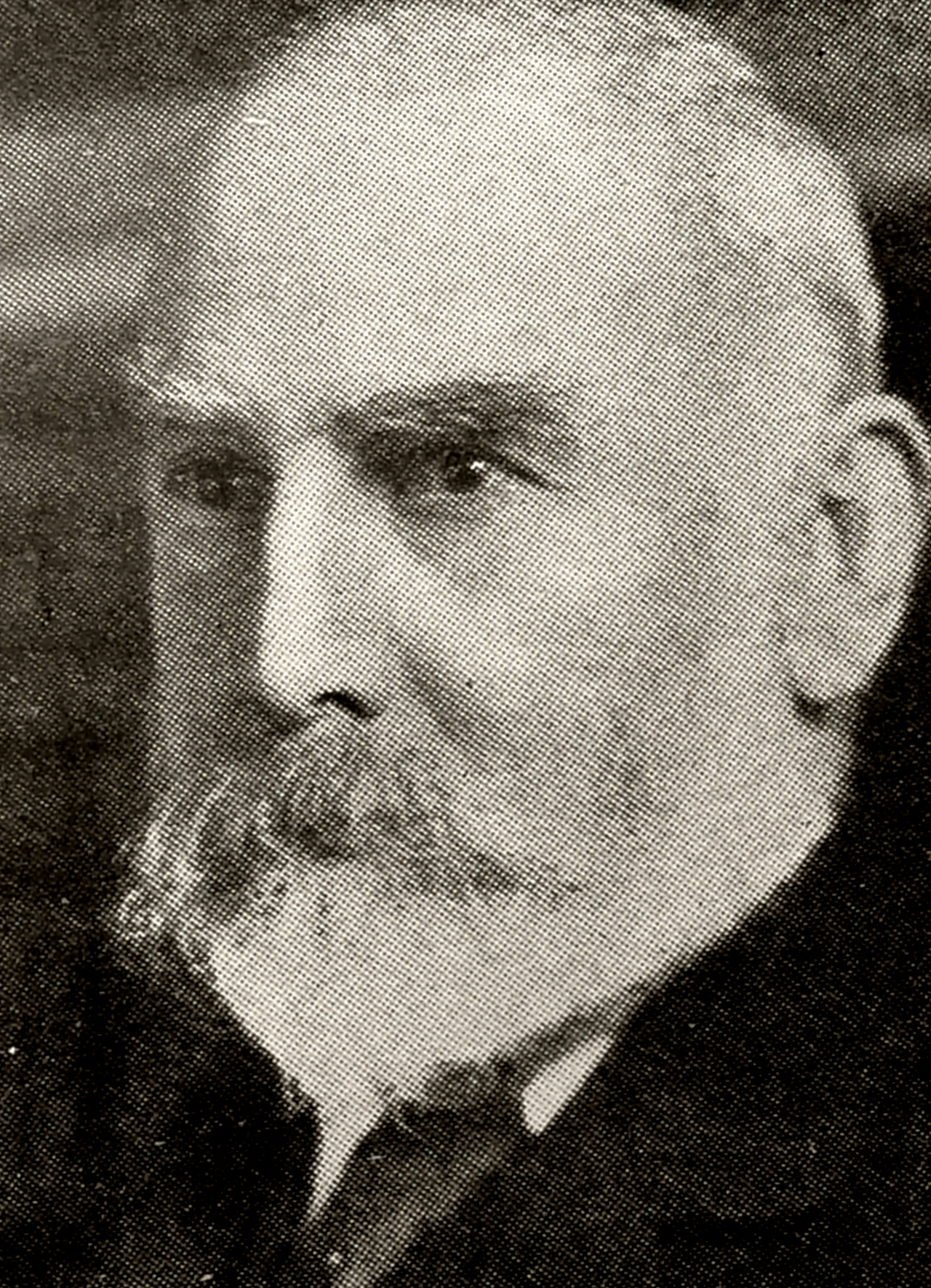
- Born: 1848 or 1849; The Boldons
- Died: 6 March 1938 (aged 89); Yarm
- Occupations: Shipowner; politician
- Political party: Conservative

Ralph Milbanke Hudson (1849 — 6 March 1938) was an English shipowner and politician.

== Life ==
He was born in 1849 in The Boldons, the son of Ralph Milbanke Hudson the elder, of Oak Lea, Witton Gilbert, County Durham. He was educated privately and abroad.

Hudson joined the family shipowning business, R. M. Hudson & Sons, of Tavistock House, Sunderland. From 1882 he was a member of the River Wear Commissioners, representing coal owners.

In 1895, the company, with other British partners, bought into meat-packing premises on the River Plate; and the SS Meath and SS Wexford began in the meat trade with Argentina, to 1886, followed by a period where they were chartered more generally. By 1912, R. M. Hudson & Sons was running a regular cargo trade with Argentina.

In 1918, Hudson was elected as Unionist Member of Parliament for Sunderland. He held the seat until 1922.

He represented Sunderland with Lloyds Register of Shipping, was chairman of the finance committee of the Shipping Federation, and a member of the council of the International Shipping Federation.

== Death ==
Hudson died in Yarm, aged 89, on 6 March 1938.

== Family ==
Hudson married, in 1883, Eliza Westropp Palliser, daughter of Graham Palliser of Plymouth.
