= Walter Raine =

English member of parliament (1874–1938)

Sir Walter Raine (1874–1938) was Conservative MP for Sunderland, at the time a two-seat constituency.

== Education ==
Raine attended Barnard Castle School.

== Business and political career ==
The managing director of his father's coal exporting firm, Raine was a prominent Methodist and held many church offices as well as civic posts in Sunderland. He was Mayor of Sunderland from 1920 to 1922.

He won the seat in 1922, held it in 1923 and 1924, but lost to Labour in 1929. He was knighted in the 1927 Birthday Honours.

A ferry named after him later operated across the River Wear in Sunderland.
