= George Hudson =

English railway financier (1800–1871)

George Hudson Cllr. Ald. MP
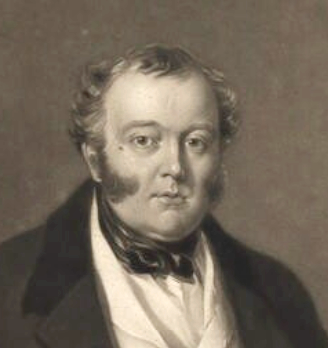

Lord Mayor of York
- In office 1846–1847
- Monarch: Queen Victoria
- Preceded by: William Richardson
- Succeeded by: James Richardson
- In office 1837–1839
- Preceded by: James Meek
- Succeeded by: William Stephenson Clark

Member of Parliament for Sunderland
- In office 1845–1859

Personal details
- Born: 10 March 1800 Howsham, East Riding of Yorkshire, England
- Died: 14 December 1871 (aged 71) London, England
- Party: Tory
- Spouse: Elizabeth Nicholson
- Occupation: Politician
- Nickname: The Railway King

George Hudson (probably 10 March 1800 – 14 December 1871) was an English railway financier and politician who, because he controlled a significant part of the railway network in the 1840s, became known as "The Railway King"—a title conferred on him by Sydney Smith in 1844.

Hudson played a significant role in linking London to Edinburgh by rail, carrying out the first major merging of railway companies (the Midland Railway) and developing his home city of York into a major railway junction. He also represented Sunderland in the House of Commons. Hudson's success was built on dubious financial practices and he frequently paid shareholders out of capital rather than money the company had earned.

Eventually in 1849, a series of enquiries, launched by the railways he was chairman of, exposed his methods, although many leading the enquiries had benefited from and approved of Hudson's methods when it suited them. Hudson fell a long way, becoming bankrupt. After losing his Sunderland seat he was forced to live abroad to avoid arrest for debt, returning only when imprisonment for debt was abolished in 1870.

Hudson's name is associated with financial wrongdoing, although others were at least partially guilty of similar practices. He never named any of his co-conspirators, and many of them turned their backs on him when the bubble burst.

== Early life ==
George Hudson was born in Howsham, a small village about 12 miles from York, to John and Elizabeth Hudson on 10 March 1800. His mother died at the age of 38 in 1806 when George was six and his father two years later in 1808. He was brought up by older brothers William and John and after a cursory education he left Howsham at age 15. Beaumont (2003) suggests that this may have been the result of the slump affecting agriculture in 1815, but there was also a payment of 12 shillings and 6 pence recorded in the Howsham poor book as being "received of George Hudson for bastardry".

Hudson was apprenticed to Bell and Nicholson, a firm of drapers in College Street, York. He finished his apprenticeship in 1820, was taken on as a tradesman, and given a share in the business early in 1821. On 17 July that year he married Nicholson's daughter Elizabeth. When Bell retired, the firm became Nicholson and Hudson. By 1827 the company was the largest business in York.

In 1827, his great-uncle Matthew Botrill fell ill and Hudson attended at his bedside. In thanks for this, the old man made a will leaving him his fortune of £30,000 (equivalent to £2,741,168 in 2025). In later years when exiled in France, Hudson acknowledged "it was the very worst thing that could have happened to me. It let me into the railways and all my misfortunes since."

Hudson became a prominent member of the York Board of Health and when cholera visited the city in 1832 Hudson distinguished himself as a spirited public servant visiting the sick and reporting on their welfare".

From being a Methodist and a Dissenter, (Note: There seems to be disagreement here between Vaughan (1997) who states he was a Methodist lay preacher and Beaumont (2003, p. 20) who states that "Hudson denied this act later in life when there would have been no harm in admitting it". Bailey (1995, p. 158) suggests that this may have been an untruth printed in the Yorkshireman which was a Whig owned anti-Hudson newspaper.) Hudson changed his allegiance to become a High Church Tory and became treasurer of the York Conservative Party in 1832. He supported the unsuccessful candidature of John Henry Lowther in the general election of 1832 and again in an 1833 by-election. Although York was primarily a Whig city the influence Hudson had on the campaigns was being noticed.

In 1833 it became possible for joint stock country banks to conduct their business in the City of London and he took a leading part in the establishment of the York Union Banking Company with its agent in the city being George Carr Glyn.

== Railways ==
=== York and North Midland Railway (YNMR) ===
==== A line to London ====
In 1833 York businessmen formed a railway committee. The initial idea of this was to link York to Leeds to enable the city to enjoy cheaper coal and emulate the industrial success being enjoyed by Leeds, Bradford and other West Yorkshire towns. Hudson was treasurer of this group and subsequently subscribed for 500 shares becoming the largest shareholder. They retained John Rennie to survey the line and Hudson accompanied him, learning the practicalities of railway construction and of dealing with landowners. In spite of the success of the locomotive powered Liverpool and Manchester Railway on the other side of the Pennines, Rennie produced plans for a horse-drawn line (in 1834), and matters fell into abeyance.

In the summer of 1834 Hudson met George Stephenson by chance in Whitby and they became friends and business associates. He learnt of Stephenson's dream of a railway from London, using a junction of the London and Birmingham Railway at Rugby, through Derby and Leeds to Newcastle – but bypassing York.

In fact, since 1833, plans had been advanced for three lines – the Midland Counties Railway from Rugby to Derby, the Birmingham and Derby Junction Railway from Hampton in Arden just outside Birmingham to Derby, and the North Midland Railway from there to Leeds.

In 1835 the York railway committee became the York and North Midland Railway (YNMR) and at Hudson's suggestion the new line would join the North Midland at Normanton a few miles south-east of Leeds. The YNMR received its Act of Parliament on 21 June 1836. and at its first official meeting Hudson was elected chairman with other officers including James Meek, James Richardson and Richard Nicholson (Hudson's brother-in-law).

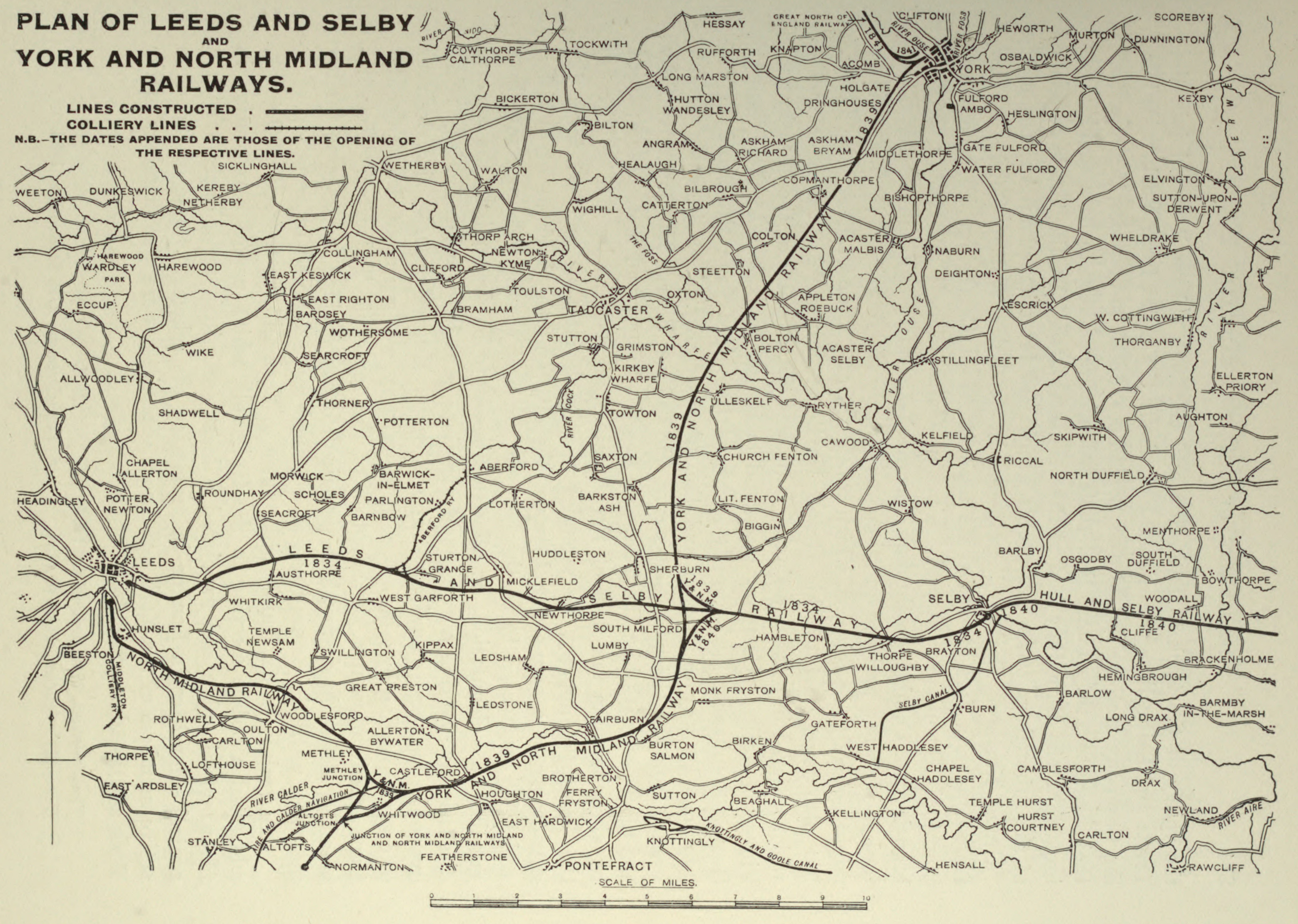
Leeds and Selby, York and North Midland railway maps

At this time there was also another railway being planned which would link York to Darlington called the Great North of England Railway. Its promoters hoped that it would be part of an East Coast route to Scotland and while initially favouring Leeds and York they eventually chose York as their southernmost destination although Hudson had little to do with this decision.

Work started on the YNMR line in April 1837 with a new station being built in York. In April – before full opening – Hudson declared a dividend of one guinea per share which, when questioned he confirmed had been paid out of the companies' capital. Some objected but both Meek and Joseph Rowntree defended the move although in later years the latter would be foremost amongst Hudson's critics. Opening to a junction on the Leeds to Selby line took place on 29 May 1839 and to Normanton on 1 July 1840 meaning London was now linked by rail to York. On 9 November 1840 the YNMR leased the Leeds and Selby Railway for £17,000 per year and Hudson promptly closed the line so passengers had to use his route via Castleford. (Note: the line re-opened to passengers in 1850.)

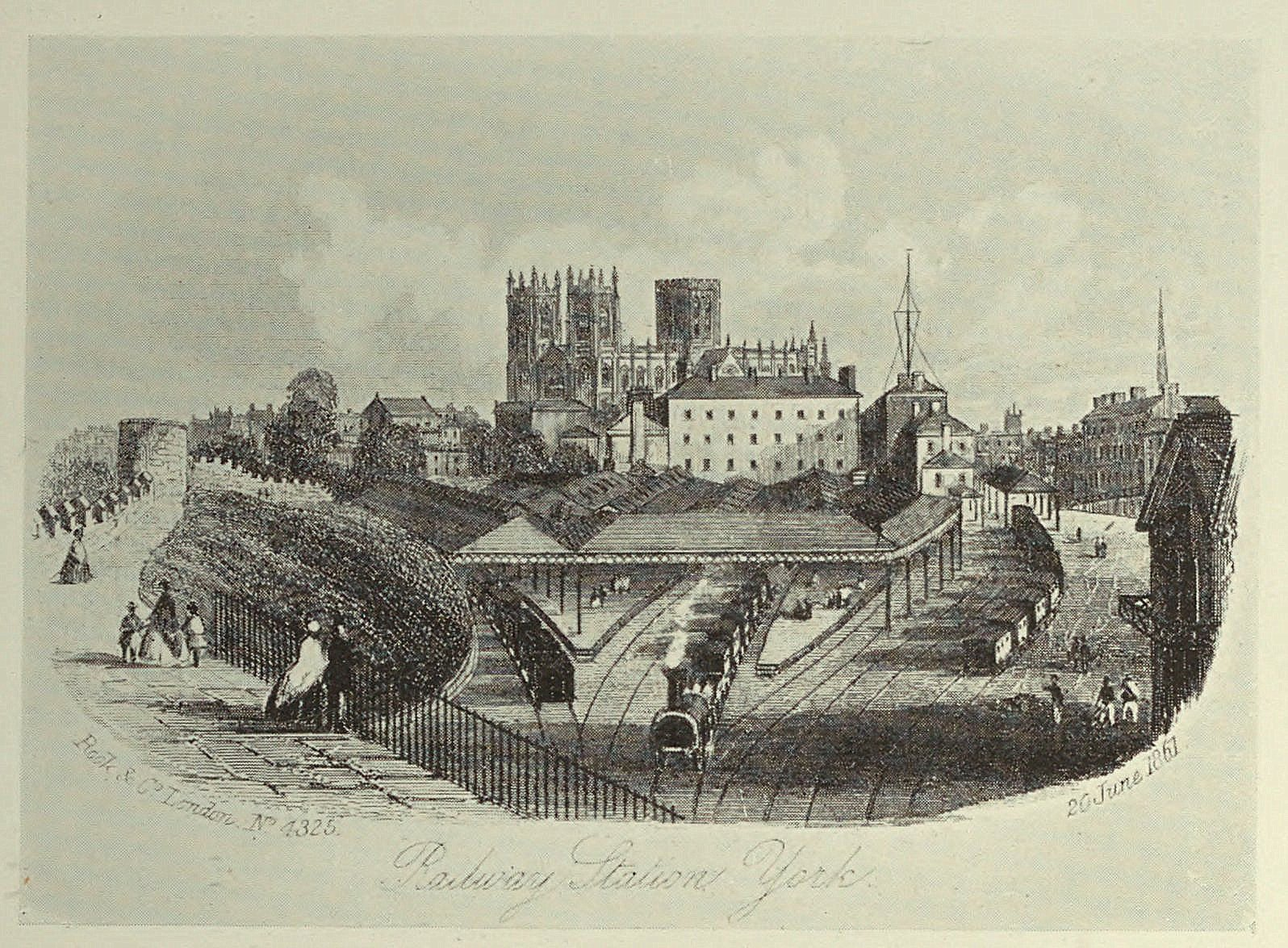
The original York station pictured in 1861

==== Other YNMR lines opened under Hudson's chairmanship ====
Other lines built by the YNMR under Hudson's chairmanship included those to Pickering and Scarborough both of which were authorised on 4 July 1844. The then isolated Whitby – Pickering Railway was purchased by the YNMR on 30 June 1845 and when the York to Pickering line opened on 8 July 1845 there was a through route from York to Whitby. This was a logical choice for Hudson as he had property in Whitby and regarded the harbour as promising for development.

The route to Scarborough – which Hudson declared would become the "Brighton of the north" – opened on the same day. It is however worth noting that at the meeting where this line was first mooted the Quaker Joseph Rowntree sounded a note of caution about the company accounts which Hudson glossed over.

On 1 July 1845 the YNMR leased the Hull and Selby Railway and on 1 October that year the Manchester, Sheffield and Lincolnshire Railway became joint lessee.

The following year lines from Seamer to Filey and Hull to Bridlington were completed opening on 5 October and 6 October respectively. The link between Filey and Bridlington was completed on 20 October 1847.

On 20 August 1847 the YNMR line to Harrogate opened between Church Fenton and Spofforth and on 4 October the line from York to Market Weighton was completed. It is worth noting that Hudson had purchased the Londesborough Hall estate in September 1845 to partly to prevent the scheme of one of his bitter enemies George Leeman succeeding.

On 8 May 1848 Hull Paragon station opened and on 20 July the line from Spofforth to Harrogate was completed. On 1 August the line linking Selby and Market Weighton was opened to traffic although it was a number of years before the line to Beverley was completed.

A direct line to Leeds was also planned but following Hudson's downfall this was abandoned. Authorised in 1846 and abandoned in 1849 the only tangible evidence of this line is a railway viaduct built at Tadcaster.

=== Railway Clearing House ===
At this time, of course, each railway was a separate company with its own infrastructure, rolling stock, even stations. (Note: Derby was one of the first to be built for more than one railway company but, even there, the one long platform was divide into three sections.) This meant that, at each stage of the journey it was necessary to change trains and buy a new ticket. With his powerful influence and financial interest in so many railways, it was Hudson who played a great part in setting up the Railway Clearing House in 1842. This was an organisation set up to manage the allocation of revenue collected by pre-grouping railway companies of fares and charges paid for passengers and goods travelling over the lines of other companies.

=== Midland Railway ===
In 1842 the North Midland Railway was in severe financial difficulty due to its high construction costs down to George Stephenson's insistence that the ruling gradient should be no more than 1 in 300. As a shareholder Hudson took over the inquiry into the situation and devised a scheme to radically reduce operating costs by reducing staff numbers and wages. Experienced staff were laid off and replaced and performance on the railway suffered. On 12 January 1843 there was a serious accident at Barnsley with a single fatality. The following public outcry demanded changes to restore the NMR to its former operating efficiency. In his first six months Hudson managed to reduce operating expenses by £11,530 and increase revenue by £2,500. (Note: There are contradictory dates for this accident as 6 January is suggested by Peacock and Joy. However the Railway Archive suggests 12 January as does Beaumont. http://www.railwaysarchive.co.uk/eventsummary.php?eventID=1641)

Like the NMR two of the other companies, the Midland Counties Railway and the Birmingham and Derby Junction Railway, that made up the route from London to York were in serious financial difficulty as they had fought a long "war of attrition" over fares. Hudson convinced the shareholders in a meeting in August 1843 that a merger between the three railways would save £325,000 per year operating costs and yield shareholder dividends of 5%. The merger was agreed in September 1843 despite some opposition from the Midland Counties directors, and Hudson became the Midland Railway's first chairman. Royal assent was given to the merger on 10 May 1844.

In 1845, as a result of work by vice-chairman John Ellis, the Midland leased the Bristol and Gloucester Railway and Birmingham and Gloucester Railway and Hudson's railways linked Gateshead in the north with Bristol in the south. In May of that year a company was formed to build a line from Manchester via Buxton and Matlock to Ambergate on the Midland line just north of Derby. Hudson was on the board of directors with Lord George Cavendish as chairman. On 4 July 1845 the Midland leased the Erewash Valley line and bought the Sheffield and Rotherham Railway on 21 July. On 4 August the Midland line from Nottingham to Lincoln opened a month after the Midland had absorbed the Leicester and Swannington Railway (the Midland's oldest constituent railway).

In 1843 a group of local businessman formed the Leeds and Bradford Railway company, with Hudson as chairman. An act of parliament was obtained in July 1843, to build a line from Leeds to Bradford via Shipley as well as a link to the North Midland Railway's terminus at Hunslet Lane, to allow connections to the south. The railway opened on 1 July 1846 and was immediately leased by the Midland Railway at very favourable terms. There was some concern here as Hudson was benefiting from this arrangement which he had initiated. Beaumont suggests it was this transaction that was where concerns started to grow about Hudson's methods.

Later in 1846 the Midland line from Syston (north of Leicester) to Melton Mowbray was opened on 2 September and then a month later the Stamford to Peterborough section opened. It opened as a through route on 20 March 1848. Other Midland lines opened under Hudson's chairmanship included Skipton-Colne, Coalville-Burton and Nottingham to Kirkby (all opening 2 October 1849).

Other LBR extensions included Shipley to Keighley on 16 March to Skipton on 8 September 1847.

=== Opposition to the Great Northern Railway (GNR) ===
One quote often attributed (incorrectly) to George Hudson was that he would make all railways come to York. Whereas there is no doubt he was instrumental in the fact that many railways did come to York he opposed the Great Northern's attempt to build a railway to York as it meant that this would offer a better through route to London.

Edmund Denison MP was keen to promote a faster link from London to York via Doncaster and formed the London and York Railway issuing a prospectus in May 1844. Early in 1845 he and Hudson had a very public argument on Derby station (about raising capital) resulting in a serious rivalry. Hudson and the Midland Railway opposed the GNR in parliament and his involvement with the Eastern Counties Railway was designed to frustrate the GNR plans and build a competing route via Cambridgeshire and Lincolnshire.

Eventually Hudson realised he could not prevent the GNR from getting to York so instead the York and North Midland built a branch in 1850 from Burton Salmon to Knottingley. The Lancashire & Yorkshire Railway had built a branch (opened 1846) towards Doncaster which joined the GNR at Shaftholme Junction. Practicality won the day and the GNR abandoned their plans for entry into York via a new line and settled for running rights over the other two lines in order that their services could reach York. This was also a move that dissatisfied many Midland Railway shareholders.

Initial services between York and London ran via Doncaster, Retford, Lincoln and Boston with the line through Grantham to Peterborough opening in 1852.

=== North from York ===
As mentioned above the other early railway in York was the Great North of England Railway who had planned to build a railway through to Newcastle and onto Scotland. By 1841 their plans had foundered and the scheme had stalled at Darlington having used up all the capital.

The Board of Trade issued a report in 1841 favouring the West Coast route linking Carlisle and Lancaster rather than the East Coast although the report stated that "should parties be found to construct the line from Darlington to Edinburgh then the western route ought to be abandoned for the present". In April Hudson called a meeting of the various companies and informed them he intended to build a line from Darlington to south of Durham where existing lines would complete the route through to Gateshead (located on the south side of the steep Tyne Valley). In August a second meeting was held where Hudson suggested the constituent railways should offer shares in the new railway to their existing shareholders. By December 1841 the Newcastle and Darlington Junction railway was formed with Hudson as chairman with work starting in 1842. The years 1843–1847 saw the various constituent railways purchased or merged into the York, Newcastle and Berwick Railway (YNBR)

A diagram showing how the companies formed the York, Newcastle and Berwick Railway

On 23 May 1844 the construction of a high-level bridge across the Tyne was authorised and on 19 June the line opened through to Gateshead. Under Hudson's chairmanship the York and Newcastle opened the Richmond branch on 11 September 1846 and took over the Hartlepool Dock and Railway on 12 October. It also leased the Clarence Railway from this time. The Durham and Sunderland Railway was absorbed 1 January 1847 and on 1 March the first section of the Newcastle and Berwick line opened with the through route to Tweedmouth opening on 1 July. On 1 August Hudson leased the Newcastle to Carlisle line and in October the Maryport & Carlisle Railway.

=== Eastern Counties Railway (ECR) ===
Hudson was appointed chairman of the ailing Eastern Counties Railway in 1845 and one of his first actions was to appoint David Waddington as his vice chairman. Hudson was interested in the ECR as he felt it offered an opportunity for an alternative route from York to London although the truth was the ECR had an appalling reputation for time keeping and safety at this time; Hudson immediately ordered the payment of a generous dividend for the shareholders.

Later investigation showed that while Hudson decided the levels of dividends to be paid to shareholders it was Waddington's job to doctor the traffic accounts to make it appear legally earned. Waddington also siphoned off £8,000 of the ECR's money into a parliamentary slush fund which strained relations between Hudson and Waddington.

Hudson cut costs in a similar way on the North Midland Railway and an accident at Romford on 18 July 1846 led the satirical magazine Punch to petition Hudson to the effect that:

"by reason of the misconduct, negligence and insobriety of drivers and sundry stokers, engineers, policemen, and others, your Majesty's subjects, various and several collisions, explosions and oversettings are continually taking place on the railways, your Majesty's dominion"

During Hudson's time as chairman the ECR network expanded with the line from Ely North Junction to Peterborough opening on 14 January 1847 and from March to Wisbech on 3 May 1847. Later that year, on 17 August, the line from Cambridge to St Ives extending to March on 1 February 1848. (Note: eventually the Cambridge-St Ives-March section became part of the Great Northern and Great Eastern Joint Railway and passenger services operated between Liverpool Street and York for a number of years.) On 2 October 1848 the line linking Maldon and Braintree opened. Also in 1848 the ECR took over operations on the Norfolk Railway and leased the Newmarket Railway from October (this had only opened the previous March).

== Fraud and ruin ==
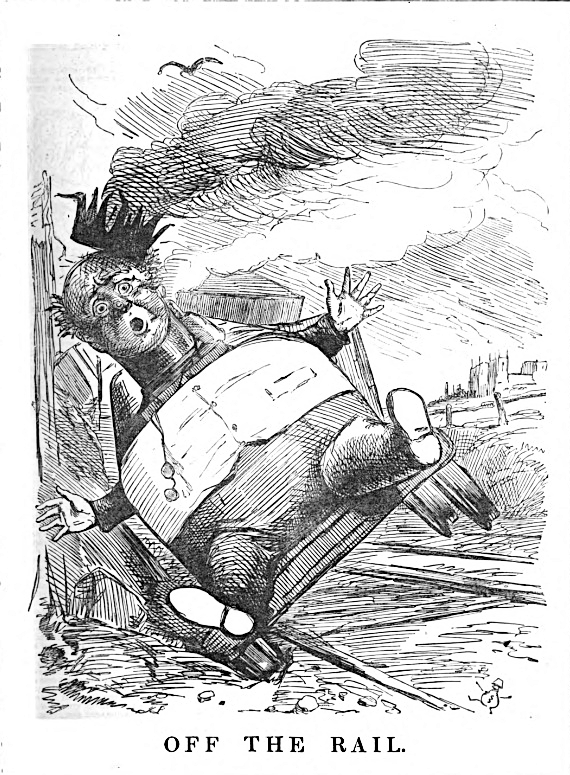
George Hudson "Off the Rail" as caricatured in Punch

In 1848 a pamphlet called "The bubble of the age" or "The fallacy of railway investment, Railway Accounts and Railway dividends" alleged that the dividends paid by Hudson's companies were paid out of capital rather than revenue. (Note: Dividends are a distribution of profits to shareholders. The amount of profit or loss is determined only after servicing debts, since creditors have a claim on the company's assets before shareholders do. If dividends are paid when there is no profit (i.e. out of capital), which is illegal, then shareholders were paid ahead of debtors – in other words, the company was insolvent.) Hudson was attacked by Midland shareholder and Liverpool shipowner J. H. Brankner in February 1849 over his fight with the GNR. This was then exacerbated by Hudson's agreement with the Great Northern to allow then to use the Burton Salmon route (see above) which many felt effectively sold them out.

Hudson had been borrowing money at a high interest rate to keep some of his companies afloat. A payment of £400,000 had to be made in 1849; many of these companies were left in a difficult position with falling revenues, an economic depression and little scope for future shareholder dividends. In York, the local corporation led by George Leeman were demanding money for the Lendal Bridge project and many of Hudson's allies were unseated at local elections that year.

The shareholders that had so fulsomely praised Hudson for the large dividends paid now lined up against him. In the Midland Railway meeting of 15 February 1849 there were calls for a committee of inquiry to be set up which Hudson managed to quash by threatening to resign. Five days later at the meeting of the York, Newcastle and Berwick Railway two shareholders Horatio Love and Robert Prance revealed a number of shares had been sold to the company at a value far in excess of what they were actually worth and the beneficiary was Hudson. This time the call for a committee of inquiry to be set up was successful. (Note: Members of a company's board of directors are expected to promote the company's financial interests. A conflict of interest arises when one of them stands to benefit monetarily from the board's decisions – such as buying shares from him. If the director conceals from the rest of the board the fact that the price at which he is selling shares to the company is higher than their value, he has promoted his own financial interests above those of the company, which is fraud.)

The Eastern Counties Railway Annual General Meeting was on 28 February and Hudson decided not to attend. Vice chair David Waddington faced the wrath of the shareholders (who had received a very small dividend) and promptly blamed the absent Hudson. Another committee of inquiry was set up under William Cash and within a month the Midland Railway shareholders had set one up and Hudson had resigned.

In April 1849 the Prance report (YNMR) revealed the wrongful valuation of the shares and Hudson had to pay back £30,000. Later that month he faced a hostile ECR inquiry (formed of men who had approved everything he did in previous years), after which he resigned. On 7 May, MP Francis Charteris alleged possible bribery of MPs and another inquiry was started. Hudson addressed parliament on 17 May but the damage was done. However, although Hudson was being scapegoated, others did not always escape. William Cash, who had called for and chaired the ECR enquiry, was revealed by that enquiry to be chair of a committee designed to frustrate one of their competitors.

On 17 May Hudson resigned from the YNMR to avoid sacking and a committee was set up to look at the allegation that Hudson had used their money to build a private station at Londesborough Park on the Market Weighton line. As 1849 progressed, more was unearthed and by the autumn Hudson was being asked to repay £750,000. He sold Londesborough Park and then paid £200,000 off to the YNBR (chairman George Leeman) rather than face being taken to court.

Despite this, in 1849 the railway bridge across the Tyne was opened and the following year Monkwearmouth Dock (Hudson was chairman of the dock company) opened in 1850. In 1852 the YNMR offered to let Hudson settle his outstanding liabilities to them for £50,000, which he rejected. The YNMR directors promptly went to court with three separate cases which proved a fatal blow to Hudson.

These were heard in 1853; Hudson lost all three, and by winter of that year he had negotiated a settlement of £72,670 to clear all his debts. He had to sell his property at Newby Park and the purchaser Viscount Downe used Hudson's enemy George Leeman to complete his purchase. By 1856 the YNMR debt was £16,000 and this was taken over by the North Eastern Railway upon merger in 1864.

== Politics ==
=== York ===
By 1830 Hudson was a Tory, although at this point the Tories did not control York. At the 1832 general election he backed the unsuccessful candidate, John Lowther, and did so again in 1833 in a by-election. In both of these elections accusations of bribery were levelled against Hudson, but in fact both sides misbehaved. Vaughan (1997) states "The Whigs were not in favour of bribery but instead used gangs of thugs to intimidate any would be Tory voter – in those days the vote was given orally and in public, surrounded by the crowd".

Lowther was elected to parliament at York at the third time of asking in the 1835 general election, and Hudson inadvertently helped his enemies by sending the poorer voters who had voted for Lowther a gold sovereign each by post. A parliamentary select committee later investigated this, but no further action was taken, mainly because unsavoury tactics had also been used by the Whigs in York.

In 1835, Hudson was elected to the City of York Corporation as an alderman. Funded by Hudson's money, the York Tories eventually gained the balance of power in York, and Hudson became Lord Mayor of York in 1836 and again in 1837. There was some doubt about the lawfulness of this second term, but by the time the matter went to court Hudson's second year as mayor was over.

Following his election as one of the two members of parliament for Sunderland in 1845, Hudson's influence led to his becoming Lord Mayor of York for a third time. One of his ambitions, to build a bridge to link the railway with Lendal in York was high on his agenda. However his attempts to raise money for this project did not go well, as he stated that the YNMR would fund the bridge with the corporation. However, when the proposal was presented to the corporation there was no mention of the YNMR. Alarmed, one of Hudson's bitterest enemies, George Leeman, led the opposition, resulting in Hudson agreeing to pay some of the costs of the bridge design himself.

=== Sunderland ===
The Sunderland Conservatives selected Hudson hoping he would help to re-invigorate two failing infrastructure projects – Monkwearmouth Dock and the Durham and Sunderland Railway. Hudson defeated the opposition candidate and was elected to parliament on 14 August 1845. In parliament Hudson – as well as looking after his railway interests – was a key player in the repeal of the Corn Laws. In his election campaign he claimed to be in favour of the Corn Laws but later joined the other side citing the need to protect British agriculture as his reason.

In 1847 Lord George Bentinck introduced a bill to build a railway network in Ireland. The cost of the proposal was £16 million which George Hudson, no doubt sensing an opportunity, supported. The government did not support the bill which was ultimately defeated.

In the run up to the 1852 general election Hudson – who by this time was in severe financial difficulty – spoke on several issues including a repeal of a timber tax and on a corrupt practices bill. He was re-elected by 54 votes in the election, but with his railway career in decline, and drinking heavily, he presented a rather forlorn figure.

After a period in Spain where he tried and failed to get a new railway project off the ground and suffering badly from gout, Hudson returned to Sunderland for the 1857 general election and was elected again albeit with a reduced majority. Between 1857 and 1859 the fortunes of the Sunderland Dock Company foundered and the town became increasingly disenchanted with Hudson.Hudson held onto his seat until his defeat at the 1859 general election where he polled 790 out of 4,000 votes. This defeat removed the protection Hudson had as an MP from imprisonment and he subsequently went into exile.

=== Whitby ===
There are contradictory accounts about his time on the continent with some claims he lived in a series of shabby hotels sometimes unable to afford food while others suggested he was reasonably provided for.

Hudson returned to England in December 1864 for the funeral of his younger brother Charles. Charles had been an influential figure in the Whitby Conservative Party and the Whitby Gazette had printed a very supportive endorsement of Hudson the previous June. Hudson had to return to France to escape his creditors but was duly selected to fight Whitby in the 1865 election.

Hudson had long had business interests in the town with some of the property he inherited from his uncle, Matthew Bottrill, being located there. The building of the railway to the town had led Hudson to form and become the chairman of the Whitby Building Company which developed the West Cliff area of the town in the 1850s. In 1865 West Cliff was mortgaged to the NER although Hudson hoped to recover it and start further developments.

Hudson returned to Whitby on 11 June 1865 where his opponent was the sitting Liberal MP Harry Thompson. Thompson was also the chairman of the North Eastern Railway (NER) and was not popular in Whitby as he had failed to join the town to the national rail network and had overseen the rise of neighbouring Scarborough as Yorkshire's leading seaside resort. Hudson made the most of this in a speech delivered on 19 June in St. Hilda's Hall, Whitby and victory seemed assured.

On Sunday 9 July 1865 (just before the election) the Sheriff of York arrested Hudson in Whitby and he was taken back to York. (Note: the date is suggested to be Monday 10 July by biographer Dr Alf Peacock (1988,89) although most newspapers reported it as the Sunday.) Although not proven, it is suggested by two of his biographers that Thompson and George Leeman were behind the arrest. (Note: Beaumont (2003) and Dr Alf Peacock (1988,89).) Given that Thompson was the chairman of one of the railways pursuing Hudson for debt and was facing defeat in Whitby, it does seem a likely scenario.

The Whitby Conservatives appointed another candidate, Charles Bagnall, who after fighting a short two-day campaign, won the election. Hudson meanwhile was remanded in York prison.

== Final years ==
Hudson however had many friends in York and the north and the thought of an old man (now aged 65) in poor health in prison offended Victorian sensibilities. Hudson was released in October 1865 as the debt (still one of many outstanding at this point) was paid off by a colliery owner called George Elliot.

Hudson once again moved abroad, but on return to London (in June 1866) he was again arrested and imprisoned for three weeks in Whitecross Street Prison. Released to see his lawyer Hudson fled the country and the following month the NER case against Hudson was held with him absent. The outcome was that Hudson's debts were reduced to £14,000 plus interest but the NER appealed and it was not until March 1869 that the matter was resolved with the original debt being restored (estimated to be £60,000 by Elliot).

While initially a blow for Hudson it acted as a turning point in his fortunes as his plight was noted by newspapers in Sunderland, Hull and Whitby. Elliot and Hugh Taylor, MP for Tynemouth and North Shields started a subscription fund for Hudson later that year which raised £1,000 in three weeks. His friends started a trust for Hudson (which they legally protected against Hudson's creditors such as the NER) to give him a regular income. With the passing of the Abolition of Imprisonment for Debt Act on 1 January 1870 Hudson was able to return to London and live with his wife Elizabeth.

In 1871 the NER finally accepted it was not going to get the monies owed and the remaining debt cases were dropped. Hudson was not in good health and was taken ill on 9 December 1871 while visiting York. He returned by train to London and died 5 days later, aged 71. His body was taken by train from Euston Station to York where the hearse drove through the streets. Many turned out to pay last respects and shop owners lowered their window blinds as a mark of respect. Hudson was buried at St Peter and St Paul's Church, Scrayingham on 21 December in accordance with his wishes.

== How others saw him ==
His name has been used to point the moral of vaulting ambition and unstable fortune, Thomas Carlyle calling him the "big swollen gambler" in one of the Latter-Day Pamphlets. He was roundly chastised by those who had blindly believed in his golden prophecies. He ruined investors, disturbed the great centres of industry, and beggared himself in the promotion of his schemes. But he had an honest faith in his schemes, and he succeeded in overcoming the powerful landed interest.

Hudson was a man who engendered strong feelings. Charles Dickens wrote of him in a letter to Count d’Orsay:

"I am disposed to throw up my head and howl whenever I hear Mr. Hudson mentioned"

In 1840 the financial journalist David Morier Evans described Hudson as:

"He is about five feet six inches in height, of a stout body frame with a short bull-neck, surmounted by a head not conspicuous for intellectuality. His face attracts attention and the expression in his eyes is no peculiar. At first sight one dislikes him…. Notwithstanding the sinister leer of his eye, the ungainly frame and the unharmonious voice, his person however rude exteriorly, is the cover of a fairer mind than was first imagined"

Sir Thomes Legard (11th Baronet of Ganton) wrote when the Filey and Bridlington branch was opened in 1846:

"When railways and railway shares were dark as night, men said that Hudson ruled, and all was right."

== Family life ==
He married Elizabeth Nicholson (1795–1886) in 1821 in York. Their four surviving children were: George (1829–1909), who was called to the bar and became an inspector of factories and a father to a son; John (b. 1832), who entered the army and was killed in the Indian Mutiny in December 1857; William (b. 1834), who became a doctor but was killed by a train in 1876; and Ann (1830–1874), who married a Polish count, Michał Hieronim Leszczyc-Sumiński.

Elizabeth Hudson died in London at 13 Pitt Street, Kensington on 15 January 1886 and their son George was recorded as living there for a few years after his mother's death.

== Generational Succession: The Hudson Family Tree ==
William, son of George Hudson, travelled to Brazil, with the aim of making prudent investments capable of discharging his father George's alleged debts. He was, regrettably, unsuccessful in his financial business undertaking, during which time he met his future wife, with whom he had a son named Guilherme Henrique Hudson. Several years later, William, alas, suffered a fatal accident, having been knocked down by a train.

Currently, according to the Hudson family tree, there are two living fifth-generation descendants of George Hudson who are resident in the South of Brazil, namely José Guilherme and Gabriela.

== Properties ==
This lists some of the key properties connected with Hudson.

=== 1 College Street, York ===
This was the site of Hudson's drapery shop and when first married he lived above the premises. There is a plaque commemorating this fact at the location (2014).

=== Monkgate, York ===
Hudson lived at 44 Monkgate with his family between 1827 and 1844. The house, which had once been occupied by local artist Thomas Beckwith had previously been the home of his uncle, Matthew Bottrill until his death. Now named Hudson House, a plaque in his memory explaining his connection to the house is displayed outside; after being used as a business address over many decades, the house was recently converted into flats.

=== Baldersby Park ===
In 1845 he bought from Lord de Grey Colen Campbell's already much-remodelled Newby Park in the North Riding of Yorkshire, between the small towns of Ripon and Thirsk, which is often referred to as the first Palladian villa in England. He rebuilt it as 'Baldersby Park, providing it with a northern front in a Jacobethan style, retaining its Georgian south front. The mansion, its interior reconstructed after a fire in 1902, is now home to Queen Mary's School, a girls' independent school.

=== Albert Gate, London ===
When Hudson became an MP he bought a property in Albert Gate in Knightsbridge, London which became the centre of the Hudsons' social life in London. In 1853, he leased the house to the French Ambassador, Count Walewski. Today (2024), the building remains the French embassy.

=== Octon Grange near Bridlington ===
Octon Grange was bought as a strategic investment in August 1844. Hudson hoped his sons would both inherit a country house and this was also close to the then proposed Bridlington branch line.

=== Londesborough Park Estate near Market Weighton ===
This estate, bought within a year, effectively ended George Leeman's plans to build a line from York to Market Weighton. The estate, bought as an investment for his sons and cost £500,000. (Note: Peacock and Joy record this as £470,000.) lt was sold in 1850 to pay off some of Hudson's debts.

=== Churton Street, Pimlico, London ===
Elizabeth Hudson lived here for many years while Hudson lived in exile. Hudson lived here in 1870–1871 and died at this address. (Note: Lambert 1934 recorded this as no 87 but the address given on his death certificate is no 37.)

== Memorials ==
Hudson House, built on the site of the former York and North Midland Railway terminus in York, was named after him, as is George Hudson Street in the City of York running parallel to North Street and Hudson Boulevard (part of the York Central development).

Hudson House was demolished in 2018 and has been replaced by a hotel/apartment complex which was named "The Hudson Quarter". The street named after him was renamed "Railway Street" following his death. In the 1980s the original name was re-introduced.

There is a Hudson Street in Whitby and a Hudson Road in Sunderland which has two docks named after him (Hudson Dock North and Hudson Dock South). The former Market Weighton to Beverley section of the York to Beverley Line is now a footpath, named the 'Hudson Way'. There is a street in Tadcaster, North Yorkshire called Hudson Way. The street lies near to the completed but never used railway viaduct over the River Wharfe. Had the railway gone on from the viaduct it would have gone over the land where Hudson Way now is.

In 1971 a pub on George Hudson Street was renamed the Railway King to commemorate Hudson on the centenary of his death; the building had previously been known as the Adelphi Hotel and is now a nightclub.

A portrait of Hudson, painted in oil during his tenure as mayor of York, is displayed in the York Mansion House. The painting, formerly stored in the basement and now positioned at the top of the main staircase, survives in good condition. Its frame, which bears a description of Hudson's offices and achievements, has been defaced; contemporary accounts attribute the damage to later occupants of the Mansion House.

== Notes ==
Parliament of the United Kingdom
Preceded by David Barclay and Viscount Howick	Member of Parliament for Sunderland; 1845–1859; With: David Barclay to 1847; Sir Hedworth Williamson 1847–1852; William Seymour 1852–1855; Henry Fenwick1855–1859	Succeeded by Henry Fenwick and William Schaw Lindsay
