= Richard Ruddock =

British journalist

Lancelot Nixon Richard Ruddock (1837–1908) – known as Richard Ruddock – was a reporter, newspaper editor and a founder of the Sunderland Echo in the 19th century.

== Early life ==
Richard Ruddock was born in Blyth, Northumberland on 27 December 1837 to William Ruddock, a hairdresser. He was the eldest of eight children. After was working as a clerk to a customs agent aged 13, he became a compositor on the Northern Daily Express, based in Newcastle.

== Journalism career ==
Ruddock moved to Sunderland in 1859, where he worked on the Sunderland Herald newspaper for a year, and he was then appointed as agent and resident reporter in Sunderland for the Newcastle Chronicle.

Ruddock established the Sunderland Penny Weekly News for the Chronicle's proprietors in 1865 and "warmly supported" John Candlish in his political battles of 1867–1868. During this time, Ruddock worked closely with Liberal councillor, and future MP for Sunderland, Samuel Storey. The pair would eventually become two of the original seven founders of the Sunderland Echo in 1873.

Ruddock visited Egypt for health reasons in 1877 and, soon after his return in 1878, he succeeded James Annand as managing editor of the Newcastle Chronicle. It was a post he held until his death.

His obituary in the Sunderland Echo on 27 June 1908, read: "Unlike Annand, who had resigned after falling out with the Chronicle's proprietor, Joseph Cowen, on the Eastern Question, the leading political issue of the day, Ruddock seems to have been content to do as Cowen wanted. His managing editorship was most notable for his avoidance of both labour disputes and libel actions."

== Personal life ==
Ruddock married Ann Whitfield, daughter of Captain James Whitfield of Sunderland, in 1861. The Census for this year shows he was living in Blandford Street, Sunderland, although he later moved to Argyle Square, Bishopwearmouth. He was survived by his wife, four sons and two daughters following his death in Newcastle on 27 June 1908.
