= Bishopwearmouth Cemetery =

Cemetery in Sunderland, England

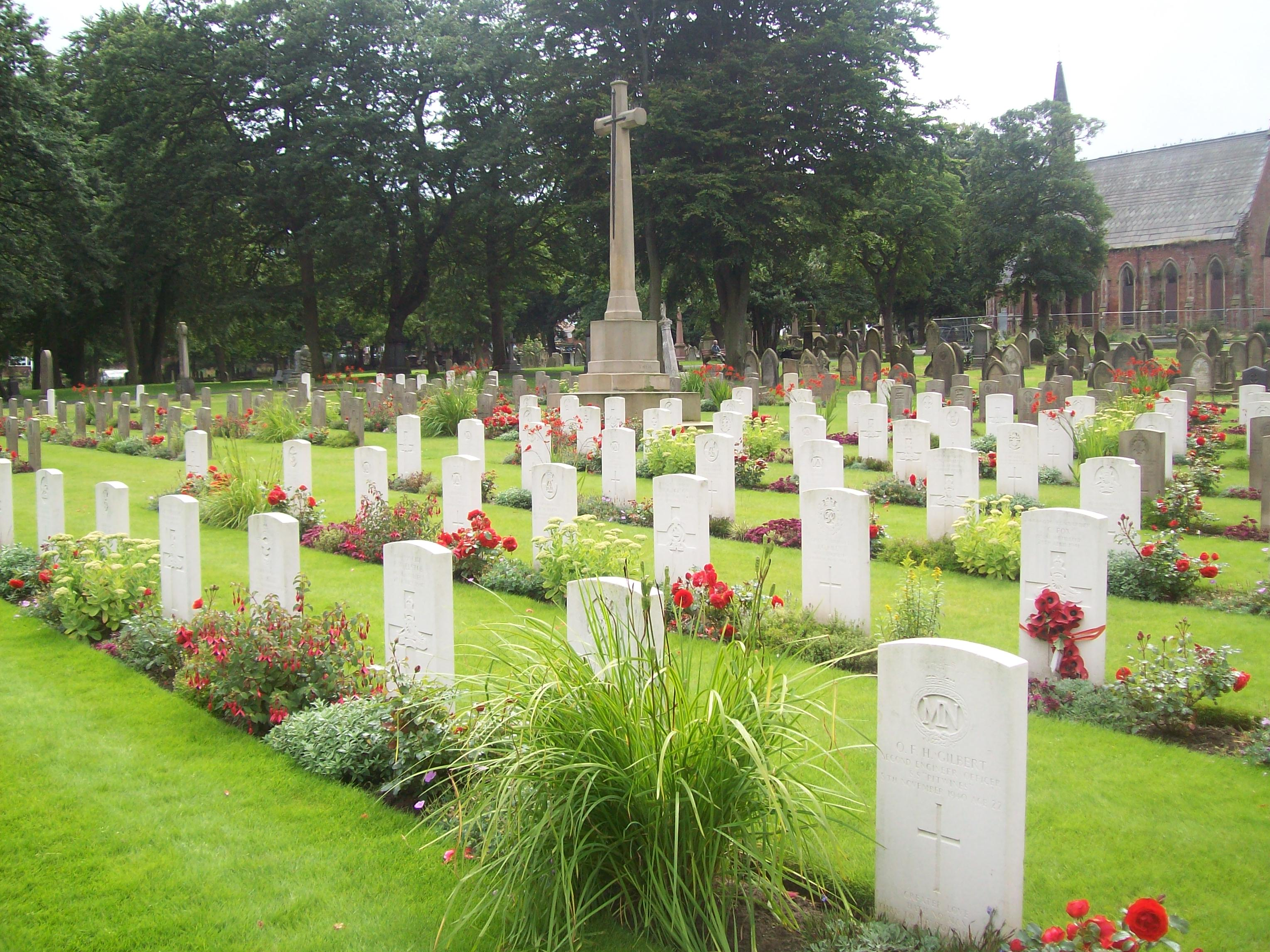
- Commonwealth war graves in Bishopwearmouth Cemetery
- Interactive map of Bishopwearmouth Cemetery

Details
- Established: 1856
- Location: Sunderland
- Country: United Kingdom
- Coordinates: 54.89872°N 1.42088°W
- Type: Public
- Owned by: Sunderland City Council
- Size: 80 acres (32 ha)
- Find a Grave: Bishopwearmouth Cemetery

Bishopwearmouth Cemetery is a cemetery in Sunderland, Tyne and Wear, England. It lies between Hylton Road and Chester Road (A183 road).

== History ==
Due to the cholera epidemic of 1831 and the subsequent overcrowding of churchyards, it was decided to build new cemeteries in Sunderland after the passing of the Burial Act 1852 and 1853. The 34 acres (14 ha) chosen for Bishopwearmouth Cemetery lay on the edge of the county and parliamentary boundary of Sunderland and was glebe land, owned by the Parish of Bishopwearmouth. The land was sold by the parish for £275 (£17,839.73 in 2007) per acre and the cemetery cost £2000 (£129,743.47 in 2007) to build. It opened in July 1856, on the same day as another new cemetery, Mere Knolls Cemetery, situated in Fulwell. All religious denominations were allotted separate areas and it soon became the town's main burial site. In 1891, the cemetery was extended further west and south, then further extended west in 1926. The whole site now covers 80 acres (32 ha).

=== Jewish burials ===
Sunderland once had a thriving Jewish population. In 1856, the only Jewish cemetery, at Ayres Quay in Bishopwearmouth, closed. A site at the new Bishopwearmouth Cemetery for Jewish burials was then dedicated in the north east corner of the cemetery (the first cemetery in County Durham to do so), adjacent to the Roman Catholic section. On the cemetery's expansion in 1926, another section was dedicated at the new western edge and on the cemetery's final expansion in 1926, the new north-west section was dedicated and a Jewish prayer house was built; this section is currently fenced-off from the other wards of the cemetery.

=== War Graves ===
In the First World War, part of Ward 3 (Section A) of the cemetery was set apart for burials of servicemen. This plot, at a central point on the path linking the cemetery's two entrances, was extended in the Second World War. In all, 237 Commonwealth service personnel (all but about 100 of whom were buried in the plot) from the First World War and 156 from the Second are buried in this cemetery. The Commonwealth War Graves Commission are also responsible for 31 non-World War service burials and one Dutch war grave. The Cemetery also contains a Cross of Sacrifice.

== Listed buildings ==
There are nine listed buildings within Bishopwearmouth Cemetery; all are Grade II. These are:

- The gates, piers and railings at the north entrance of the east side of the cemetery.
- The gates, piers and railings at the south entrance of the east side of the cemetery.
- The north (Roman Catholic) chapel.
- The south (Anglican) chapel (vandalised)
- The south east lodge.
- The tomb of Christopher Maling Webster (1813–1890) and his family.
- The tomb of John Bolam (1815–1885) and his family.
- The tomb of Margaret Taylor (1849–1911), wife of Jenneson Taylor.
- The tomb of members of the Vaux family.

The central (Nonconformist) chapel was formerly a listed building until it was demolished due to vandalism. The memorial to the Victoria Hall disaster, formerly situated in the cemetery and now in Mowbray Park, is also a listed building.

== Notable burials ==
- James Allan, founder of Sunderland A.F.C.
- Sir Robert Appleby Bartram, shipbuilder.
- Joseph John Binns, department store owner.
- Sir Jacob "Jack" Cohen, local politician.
- Sir Theodore Doxford, shipbuilder and politician.
- Sir James Laing, shipbuilder.
- Martini Maccomo, lion tamer.
- Mamie Stuart, murder victim interred 100 years after her death.
- Sir Luke Thompson, coal merchant and politician.
- Thomas Scott Turnbull, draper and co-founder of the Sunderland Echo.
- Joseph Wiggins, Arctic explorer.
- Sir Albert Scholick Wilkin, confectioner.
