= Thomas Scott Turnbull =

Thomas Scott Turnbull (28 October 1825 – 22 March 1880) was the son of a Newcastle saddler. He went on to open one of the largest drapery houses in Northeast England, was a founder member of a daily provincial newspaper and served as Mayor of Sunderland.

== Early life ==
Thomas Scott Turnbull, the son of saddler John Turnbull, was born in Newcastle on October 28, 1825. After being educated at St Mary's School, Newcastle, he went to work for "Dunn and Bainbridge" - then the largest drapery firm in Newcastle. Turnbull soon rose to a "high position", later gaining further experience of the trade by working in several large commercial houses in London, before moving to Sunderland in 1850 and starting his own business.

== Business life ==
Turnbull was extremely forward-thinking, introducing a system of "small profits and quick returns" at a time when established drapers gave long credit. From humble beginnings, he built up his Sunderland-based business "Albion House" into one of the largest drapery houses in Northern England. At his death, it occupied 122-126 High Street West, Sunderland, and the premises included sleeping and dining accommodation for 160 assistants, plus a library of nearly 2,500 volumes for their use. A second, smaller, Albion House drapery was also operated in Silver Street, Durham.

== Political life ==
Politically, Turnbull was a Liberal. He was elected to Sunderland Town Council, representing Bridge Ward, in 1866, but retired three years later rather than standing for re-election on account of his business commitments.

It was Turnbull's interest in politics which led to his friendship, and future business partnership, with Samuel Storey. Storey, a former teacher and future MP for Sunderland, was aware of a gap in the market for a local daily newspaper, and was also keen to find a method of publicising his Radical points of view. Storey and Turnbull were two of the original seven founders of the Sunderland Echo in 1873. Each of the seven invested £500 towards the project and the paper is still published today.

Turnbull returned to politics following a seven-year break, after taking his son, Edward, into partnership. He was elected to the council in 1876, this time for Bishopwearmouth Ward, and became Mayor of Sunderland in November 1880. He died of typhoid fever, however, in March of the following year and was succeeded as Mayor by Samuel Storey.

== Private life ==
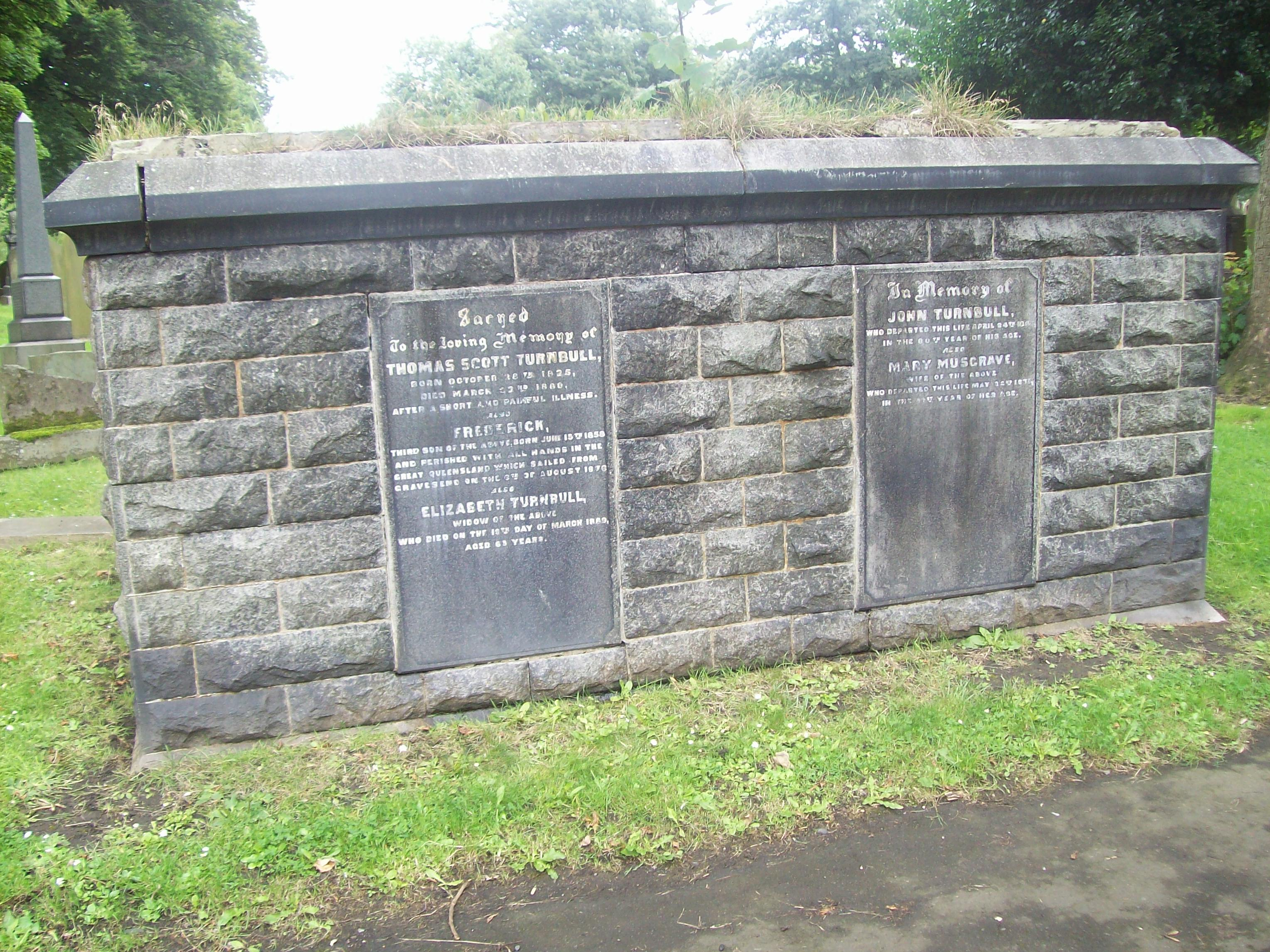
The Turnbull mausoleum, Bishopwearmouth Cemetery.

Turnbull was a member of the Established Church and warden of St Mark's Church, Sunderland. He was survived by a widow, four sons and three daughters. He was laid to rest in the Turnbull family mausoleum at Bishopwearmouth Cemetery.

His son, Thomas Strover Turnbull, became the youngest winner of the boat race in 1873 with Cambridge, at the age of 18 years and 12 days, a record that stands to this day.

Civic offices
Preceded by Samuel Sinclair Robson	Mayor of Sunderland; 1879-1880	Succeeded by Samuel Storey
