= Shields Gazette =

Oldest provincial evening newspaper in the United Kingdom

- Type: Daily newspaper
- Owner: National World
- Founded: 1849
- Language: English
- Country: United Kingdom
- Circulation: 1,420 (as of 2023)
- ISSN: 1350-0554 (print); 2755-8754 (web)
- Website: shieldsgazette.com

The Shields Gazette, established in 1849, is a daily newspaper, which claims to be the oldest provincial evening newspaper in the United Kingdom.

It was originally established as a weekly paper - the North and South Shields Gazette and Northumberland and Durham Advertiser - but became a daily evening paper after the repeal of Stamp Duty in 1855. Later it became the Shields Gazette and Shipping Telegraph.

It is now part of North East Press, a division of Johnston Press, and the paper has been printed on the presses of the Sunderland Echo in Pennywell, Sunderland, since 1992. In July 2012 most of the reporters, sports and editing staff moved to a new base at the Sunderland Echo.

The paper covers the whole of South Tyneside. In the period December 2010-June 2011, it had an average daily circulation of 15,161.
