= Henry Mitcalfe =

Member of Parliament for Tynemouth and North Shields
- In office 2 July 1841 – 28 July 1847
- Preceded by: Charles Edward Grey
- Succeeded by: Ralph Grey

Personal details
- Born: 1788
- Died: 1853 (aged 64–65)
- Party: Conservative

Henry Mitcalfe (1788–1853) was a British Conservative politician.

Mitcalfe was elected Conservative Member of Parliament for Tynemouth and North Shields at the 1841 general election and held the seat until 1847 when he did not seek re-election.

Parliament of the United Kingdom
Preceded by Charles Edward Grey	Member of Parliament for Tynemouth and North Shields; 1841–1847	Succeeded by Ralph Grey
