= Frederick Young (writer) =

Sir Frederick Young KCMG (21 June 1817 – 9 November 1913) was a British traveller and writer on imperial affairs. He promoted the permanent union of the colonies with the United Kingdom, and published works on imperial federation and the empire. He also travelled widely, visiting Canada, Greece, South Africa and Turkey.

He was the son of George Frederick Young, M.P., and was born in Limehouse, London. He was educated in Homerton before becoming a merchant in London. In 1869 he began an association with the Royal Colonial Institute that was to last for the rest of his life.

He was a J.P. and Deputy-Lieutenant.

His papers are at Cambridge University Library.
