= Sunderland Orphan Asylum =

Building in Sunderland, Tyne and Wear, England

Coordinates: 54.9065°N 1.3671°W

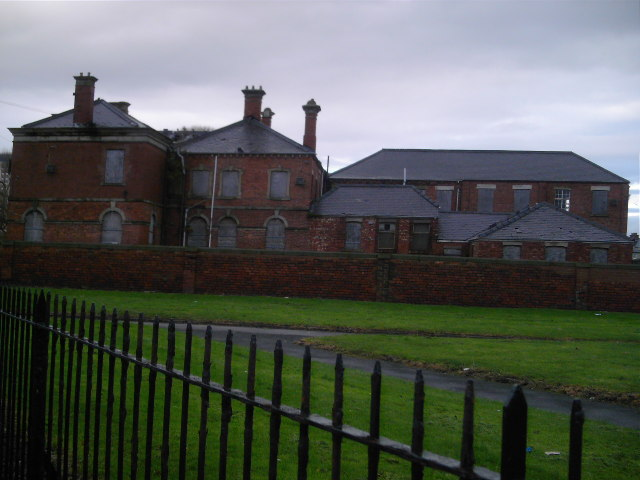
The building in 2005

Sunderland Orphan Asylum was opened in 1861 following the Sunderland Orphan Asylum Act 1853 (16 & 17 Vict. c. 21 Pr.) and stands on the edge of Town Moor in Sunderland, Tyne and Wear, England.

The orphanage was set up to provide an education for male orphans of seafarers. The boys were taught seamanship and wore a naval style sailor suit as a uniform principals formed the governing body for the asylum. They were prominent figures in the local community and included John Candlish. Masters included John Clark and George King.

The orphanage was designed in an Italianate style by the architects Charles and Lucas of London. The construction was supervised by a local architect, Thomas Moore. The building is Grade II listed as are the gates, piers and railings. The initial building was funded by selling access rights to railway companies
