= Henry Fenwick (Sunderland MP) =

British politician (1820-1868)

Member of Parliament
- In office January 1855 – February 1866
- Constituency: Sunderland

Personal details
- Born: 1820
- Died: 18 April 1868 (aged 47–48)
- Party: Liberal
- Spouse: Jane Lutwidge Cookson

Henry Fenwick (1820 – 18 April 1868) was a British barrister and Liberal Party politician.

== Life ==
He was the son of Thomas Fenwick of Southill Hall, co. Durham.

Fenwick matriculated at St John's College, Cambridge in 1838, graduating B.A. in 1842 and then M.A. in 1845. He was called to the bar at the Inner Temple in 1842, and went the Northern Circuit, until 1851.

Fenwick died on 18 April 1868 at Lansdowne House, Richmond, Surrey.

== Politics ==
He first stood for election to the House of Commons in December 1852, when he was unsuccessful at a by-election for the City of Durham. He was elected as a member of parliament for Sunderland at a by-election in January 1855, and held the seat until February 1866, when he was appointed as Civil Lord of the Admiralty and was defeated in the resulting by-election.

== Family ==
Fenwick married in 1861 Jane Lutwidge Cookson (died 1891), eldest daughter of John Cookson of Meldon Park and his wife Sarah Ridley, eldest daughter of Sir Matthew White Ridley, 3rd Baronet. Their children included:

- Henry Thomas Fenwick MP (1863–1939), Colonel in the Royal Horse Guards and polo player.
- Bertram Emilius Fenwick, second son going by Bertram E. Fenwick.
- Constance, married in 1882 Walter Albert Sandeman (1858–1937), son of Albert George Sandeman.
- Laura, married in 1890 Percy St Clair Matthey, son of the metallurgist George Matthey.

Parliament of the United Kingdom
Preceded by William Seymour; George Hudson	Member of Parliament for Sunderland; 1855–1866; With: George Hudson 1855–1859; William Schaw Lindsay 1859–1865; James Hartley 1865–1866	Succeeded by James Hartley; John Candlish
Political offices
Preceded by Hugh Childers	Civil Lord of the Admiralty; January–April 1866	Succeeded by Lord John Hay
