= Charles Edward Grey =

English judge and colonial governor

Sir Charles Edward Grey GCH (1785 – 1 June 1865) was an English judge and colonial governor.

== Biography ==
He was a younger son of Ralph William Grey of Backworth House, Earsdon, Northumberland, and his wife, Elizabeth, daughter of Charles Brandling MP, of Gosforth House, Northumberland. Grey was educated at Eton, followed by University College, Oxford, graduating in 1806, and elected a fellow of Oriel College, Oxford in 1808. He was called to the bar in 1811, and appointed a commissioner of bankruptcy in 1817. In 1820 he was appointed a Judge in the Supreme Court of Madras and knighted, serving until his transfer to be Chief Justice on the Supreme Court of Bengal from 1825 to 1832.

In 1835, Grey was made a Privy Counsellor and awarded Knight Grand Cross of the Royal Guelphic Order (GCH) in 1836. He was the elected member of parliament for the constituency of Tynemouth and North Shields from 1838 to 1841.

In 1841 he was appointed Governor of Barbados and the Windward Islands (covering St Lucia, Trinidad, Tobago and St Vincent) and in 1846 was appointed Governor of Jamaica.

He retired to England in 1853. He died in Tunbridge Wells in 1865 and was buried in Kensal Green Cemetery.

In April 1821, before his departure for Madras, he married Elizabeth (1801–1850), second daughter of Revd Sir Samuel Clarke Jervoise, Bt, of Idsworth Park, Hampshire. They had four sons and four daughters.

Parliament of the United Kingdom
Preceded by George Frederick Young	Member of Parliament for Tynemouth and North Shields; 1838–1841	Succeeded by Henry Mitcalfe
Political offices
Preceded by Charles Henry Darling	Governor of Barbados; 1841–1846	Succeeded by William Reid
Preceded by George Henry Frederick Berkeley (acting)	Governor of Jamaica; 1847–1853	Succeeded by Sir Henry Barkly
