= List of Privy Counsellors (1820–1837) =

This is a list of privy counsellors of the United Kingdom appointed between the accession of King George IV in 1820 and the death of King William IV in 1837.

== George IV, 1820–1830 ==
=== 1820 ===
- Lord Boyle (1772–1853)
- The Lord Gwydyr (1754–1820)
- Stratford Canning (1786–1880)
- Sir Gore Ouseley, Bt. (1770–1844)

=== 1821 ===
- The Lord Beresford (1768–1854)
- The Marquess of Graham (1799–1874)
- The Lord Gwydyr (1782–1865)
- The Duke of Dorset (1767–1843)
- The Marquess Conyngham (1766–1832)
- Henry Goulburn (1784–1856)

=== 1822 ===
- Charles Williams-Wynn (1775–1850)
- William Fremantle (1766–1850)
- Sir George Warrender, Bt (1782–1849)
- Lord Burghersh (1784–1859)
- Augustus Foster (1780–1848)
- The Hon. Frederick Lamb (1782–1853)
- Charles Hope (1763–1851)

=== 1824 ===
- Sir Robert Gifford (1779–1826)
- Sir William Alexander (1754–1842)
- The Hon. William Noel-Hill (1773–1842)
- Sir William Best (1767–1845)

=== 1825 ===
- The Duke of Northumberland (1785–1847)
- Charles Vaughan (1774–1849)
- Henry Williams-Wynn (1783–1856)

=== 1826 ===
- The Marquess of Salisbury (1791–1868)
- The Hon. Sir Robert Gordon (1791–1847)
- Sir John Copley (1772–1863)

=== 1827 ===
- The Duke of Devonshire (1790–1858)
- The Duke of Portland (1768–1854)
- The Marquess of Anglesey (1768–1854)
- Viscount Dudley and Ward (1781–1833)
- Anthony Hart (1754–1831)
- William Lamb (1779–1848)
- Sir George Cockburn (1772–1853)
- The Duke of Leeds (1775–1838)
- The Lord Plunket (1764–1854)
- Sir Samuel Hulse (1746–1837)
- The Hon. James Abercromby (1776–1858)
- Robert Wilmot-Horton (1784–1841)
- Stephen Lushington (1776–1868)
- Lord William Bentinck (1774–1839)
- John Charles Herries (1778–1855)
- Sir Lancelot Shadwell (1779–1850)
- Sir James Mackintosh (1765–1832)
- Sir William Keppel (d. 1834)

=== 1828 ===
- The Lord Ellenborough (1790–1871)
- Thomas Frankland Lewis (1780–1855)
- The Lord Hill (1772–1842)
- Sir Christopher Robinson (1766–1833)
- Viscount Lowther (1787–1872)
- Sir George Murray (1772–1846)
- Sir Henry Hardinge (1785–1856)
- Thomas Courtenay (1782–1841)
- John Wilson Croker (1780–1857)
- John Calcraft (1765–1831)
- Lord Francis Leveson-Gower (1800–1857)
- Henry Hobhouse (1776–1854)
- Robert Adair (1763–1855)
- Charles James Blomfield (1786–1857)

=== 1829 ===
- The Earl of Rosslyn (1762–1837)
- Sir Nicholas Conyngham Tindal (1776–1846)
- Sir Brook Taylor (1776–1846)

=== 1830 ===
- The Duke of Gordon (1770–1836)

== William IV, 1830–1837 ==
=== 1830 ===
- The Duke of Norfolk (1765–1842)
- The Marquess of Cholmondeley (1792–1870)
- The Earl of Jersey (1773–1859)
- The Earl of Belfast (1797–1883)
- Sir William Rae, Bt (1769–1842)
- The Viscount Hereford (1777–1843)
- The Earl of Clare (1792–1851)
- The Duke of Richmond (1791–1860)
- The Earl of Albemarle (1772–1849)
- The Lord Durham (1792–1840)
- The Lord Auckland (1784–1849)
- The Lord Brougham and Vaux (1778–1868)
- Lord John Russell (1792–1878)
- Viscount Althorp (1782–1845)
- The Hon. George Agar-Ellis (1797–1833)
- The Hon. Edward Stanley (1799–1869)
- George Robert Dawson (1790–1856)
- Sir James Graham, Bt (1792–1861)
- Charles Poulett Thomson (1799–1841)
- Sir William Johnstone Hope (1766–1831)
- The Viscount Anson (1795–1854)
- Robert Grant (1779–1838)
- The Marquess of Clanricarde (1802–1874)
- The Hon. Robert Grosvenor (1801–1893)
- The Lord Foley (1780–1833)
- Sir James Kempt (1764–1854)

=== 1831 ===
- The Earl of Erroll (1801–1846)
- The Earl Howe (1796–1870)
- The Earl of Rosebery (1783–1868)
- Viscount Duncannon (1781–1847)
- Michael Angelo Taylor (1757–1834)
- Lord Stanley (1775–1851)
- The Lord Plunket (1764–1854)
- Sir Henry Parnell, Bt (1776–1842)
- The Duke of Leinster (1791–1874)
- Sir Frederick Adam (1781–1853)
- Sir Edward East, Bt (1764–1847)
- Thomas Erskine (1788–1864)

=== 1832 ===
- Sir John Hobhouse, Bt (1786–1869)
- Charles Tennyson (1784–1861)
- Sir William Garrow (1760–1840)
- The Earl of Mulgrave (1797–1863)
- Holt Mackenzie (1786–1876)
- Henry Ellis (1788–1855)
- The Earl of Minto (1782–1859)
- Sir Thomas Denman (1779–1854)

=== 1833 ===
- The Earl of Denbigh (1796–1865)
- The Earl of Munster (1794–1842)
- Edward Ellice (1783–1863)
- Edward Littleton (1791–1863)
- Sir James Parke (1782–1868)
- Sir John Bosanquet (1773–1847)
- Sir Alexander Johnston (1775–1849)
- The Duke of Argyll (1768–1839)

=== 1834 ===
- The Marquess of Sligo (1788–1845)
- Sir John Bayley, Bt. (1763–1841)
- Sir Robert Graham (1744–1836)
- Sir John Vaughan (1768–1839)
- Thomas Spring Rice (1790–1866)
- Robert Fergusson (1768–1838)
- The Earl of Gosford (1776–1849)
- Sir Charles Pepys (1781–1851)
- Sir Herbert Jenner (1778–1852)
- The Viscount Combermere (1773–1865)
- The Lord Wharncliffe (1776–1845)
- Sir Edward Knatchbull, Bt (1781–1849)
- Sir James Scarlett (1769–1844)
- Sir Edward Sugden (1781–1875)
- Alexander Baring (1774–1848)
- Lord Granville Somerset (1792–1848)
- William Yates Peel (1789–1858)
- Joseph Planta (1787–1847)
- The Earl of Chesterfield (1805–1866)
- The Earl de Grey (1781–1859)

=== 1835 ===
- Viscount Castlereagh (1805–1872)
- The Hon. Henry Lowry-Corry (1803–1873)
- Viscount Howick (1802–1894)
- Henry Labouchere (1798–1869)
- The Marquess Conyngham (1797–1876)
- Viscount Morpeth (1802–1864)
- Sir Hussey Vivian, Bt (1775–1842)
- The Hon. George Byng (1806–1886)
- Sir Harford Jones Brydges, Bt (1764–1847)
- Lord Charles FitzRoy (1791–1865)
- Sir Charles Edward Grey (1785–1865)

=== 1836 ===
- Henry Bickersteth (1783–1851)
- The Lord Elphinstone (1807–1860)

=== 1837 ===
- The Viscount Falkland (1803–1884)
- James Stewart-Mackenzie (1784–1843)
