= Ralph Grey (MP) =

British politician

Ralph William Grey (1819 in Earsdon, Northumberland – 1 October 1869 in Kingston upon Thames, Surrey) was a British Whig politician.

He was the son of Ralph William Grey (died 1822) of Backworth House, Northumberland, and his wife Ann was the daughter of Rev. Sir Samuel Jervoise, 1st Baronet, and was educated at Eton College. He matriculated at Trinity College, Cambridge in 1836, graduating B.A. in 1840. In 1839 he became private secretary to Charles Poulett Thomson, shortly to become Baron Sydenham and the first Governor General of Canada.

At the 1847 general election he was elected unopposed as the Member of Parliament (MP) for Tynemouth and North Shields, but in 1852 he narrowly lost the seat to his Conservative opponent by 340 votes to 328. He returned to Parliament two years later when he was elected for Liskeard at a by-election in March 1854, and was re-elected at the general elections in 1857 and 1859. He resigned from the House of Commons on 6 August 1859 by becoming Steward of the Manor of Northstead.

== See also ==
- Politics of the United Kingdom

Parliament of the United Kingdom
Preceded by Henry Mitcalfe	Member of Parliament for Tynemouth & North Shields; 1847 – 1852	Succeeded by Hugh Taylor
Preceded by Richard Crowder	Member of Parliament for Liskeard; 1854 – 1859	Succeeded by Ralph Bernal Osborne
