= William Schaw Lindsay =

British merchant and shipowner

W.S. Lindsay MP
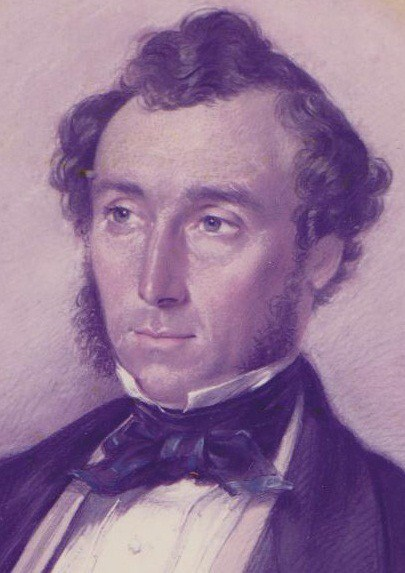
- Lindsay c1855.
- Born: William Schaw Lindsay; 19 December 1815; Ayr, Scotland
- Died: 28 August 1877 (aged 61); Shepperton, Middlesex, England
- Education: Ayr Academy
- Occupations: Mariner, shipowner, Member of Parliament and author
- Years active: 1834–1877
- Spouse: Helen Stewart (1843–1877)
- Children: William Stewart Lindsay
- Parent(s): Joseph Lindsay; Mary Belch

William Schaw Lindsay (19 December 1815 – 28 August 1877) was a British merchant and shipowner who was the Liberal Member of Parliament for Tynemouth and North Shields from 1854 to 1859 and for Sunderland from 1859 until his resignation on grounds of ill-health in 1864.

== Life ==
=== Career ===
He was born in Ayr in south-west Scotland on 19 December 1815 at the manse of his uncle, the Reverend William Schaw. He lost both his parents by the time he was ten and was brought up by his uncle, a free kirk minister. Reverend William wished him to follow the same calling but he instead left home in 1831 and worked his passage to Liverpool by trimming coals on board a collier. He was subsequently engaged as a cabin-boy aboard the West Indiaman Isabella. In 1834, he became second mate, but soon afterwards received severe injuries following a shipwreck. On his recovery in 1835 he became chief mate of the Olive Branch, a merchantman owned by a Mr. Greenwell of Sunderland. In 1836, he was appointed captain of the vessel and, in 1839, when in the Persian Gulf, he was wounded during an encounter with a pirate. He retired from the sea in 1840.

Lindsay found further employment with Greenwell in 1841 as an agent for the Castle Eden Coal Company in Hartlepool where he played a part in the town becoming an independent port, and helped to create its docks and wharves. In 1845, he moved to London to represent the company. With the coal-fitting business he combined that of shipbroking and an agency for his brother-in-law, a Glasgow iron merchant. He established the firm of W. S. Lindsay & Co., which soon became one of the largest shipowning concerns in the world, and he retained his connection with it until ill-health compelled him to retire in 1864.

In 1852, Lindsay ordered the 900 ton W. S. Lindsay, the largest iron ship that had been built to date, from the Tyneside shipyard of Coutts and Parkinson. She was designed to take emigrants to Australia and although she cost one-third more than similar vessels, the ship was three times more efficient with 280 cabins including 60 in first class. Lindsay held 54 of the 64 shares in the ship and her master, George Western, the other ten. The W. S. Lindsay heeled over in a storm in The Downs on her maiden voyage with 300 passengers aboard; she had to be towed back to London at a cost of £3,000.

Lindsay was an unsuccessful parliamentary candidate for Monmouth in April and for Dartmouth in July 1852, but was elected, after a severe contest, for Tynemouth and North Shields in March 1854. He continued to represent Tynemouth until the April 1859 general election, when his advocacy for a repeal of the navigation laws compelled him to withdraw before the polling. He was returned, however, for Sunderland. In August 1859, the non-electors of Tynemouth presented Lindsay with a rosewood cabinet containing the works of Bacon, Shakespeare, Milton and Burns, "to record their gratitude for the ability with which he advocated the Public Interests in Parliament and for his Liberality in promoting education in the Borough".

During the American Civil War (1861–65), Lindsay supported the bid for Confederacy recognition and spoke on their behalf in the British Parliament. His correspondence on the topic with the future Prime Minister Benjamin Disraeli and the American politicians John Slidell and James Murray Mason is held at the University of Missouri Library.

In 1865, he was forced by illness to retire from public life. While in the House of Commons he did all he could to protect maritime interests, both naval and commercial, and he took an active part in the formation of the Administrative Reform Association. After his retirement, Lindsay occupied himself with literary work. He died at Shepperton Manor, Middlesex, on 28 August 1877.

=== Family ===
On 14 November 1843, he married Helen, sister of the Glasgow ironmaster Robert Stewart, whose pig iron Lindsay also dealt in. Their son, William Stewart Lindsay, was born in London in 1849 and died in Timaru, New Zealand, on 28 June 1924.

=== Literary works ===
In his writing, Lindsay strove to improve the shipping laws, not only in England, but abroad, particularly in France and the US, and he persistently advocated the removal of all restrictions on free trade in maritime affairs. His opus magnum, entitled History of Merchant Shipping and Ancient Commerce (4 vols. 8vo, London, 1874–6), was a comprehensive reference on the subject. Among his other writings were:

- Letters on the Navigation Laws, 8vo, London, 1849, reprinted from the Morning Herald.
- Our Navigation and Mercantile Marine Laws, considered with a view to their general revision and consolidation; also, an Enquiry into the principal Maritime Institutions, 8vo, London, 1852; 2nd edit., condensed, 1853.
- Confirmation of Admiralty Mismanagement … with Reply to the Charges of Sir C. Wood … June 22 and July 10, 8vo, London, 1855.
- Remarks on the Law of Partnership and Limited Liability, 8vo, London, 1856, being correspondence with his friend Richard Cobden, MP.
- Our Merchant Shipping: its present state considered, 8vo, London, 1860.
- Manning the Royal Navy and Mercantile Marine … also Belligerent and Neutral Rights in the event of War: a Review of the past and present Methods, 8vo, London, 1877.

A collection of his speeches on navy expenditure was privately printed while Lindsay related many of his sea experiences in the Log of my Leisure Hours, 3 vols., and in Recollections of a Sailor; the latter work he did not live to complete.

A biography of his life has been written by Bill Lindsay his great-great-grandson entitled William Schaw Lindsay Victorian Entrepreneur.

== See also ==
- Shipbroking
- Coaling (ships)
- Panic of 1847
- Navigation Acts § Repeal

Parliament of the United Kingdom
Preceded by Hugh Taylor	Member of Parliament for Tynemouth and North Shields; 1854–1859	Succeeded by Hugh Taylor
Preceded by George Hudson and Henry Fenwick	Member of Parliament for Sunderland; 1859–1864; With: Henry Fenwick	Succeeded by Henry Fenwick and James Hartley
