= John Coutts (shipbuilder) =

Scottish shipbuilding pioneer (1810–1862)

John Henry Sangster Coutts (1810–1862) was a Scottish shipbuilding pioneer who built the first full-size iron ship and the first "double bottomed" ship.

== Life ==
John Coutts was born in 1810 in Aberdeen, the son of farmer Patrick Coutts and Margaret Milne. Coutts was always regarded as a gifted Aberdonian from his precocious up-bringing. Coutts had been the son to a farmer named Patrick Coutts in Aberdeenshire. Had been titled one of the "Three Wise Men" from Arberdeen, Coutts was fundamental and the foundation to the innovative iron ship building industry in Tyneside. In 1839, the first iron made sailing ship, the John Garrow, was built along with the help of his partner John Ronalds in his shipyard in Aberdeen. It was shortly thereafter in 1840 when Coutts moved south to Tyneside to go at it alone and open his own shipyard.

John Coutts was very adamant about making it known he was not related to the well renowned and highly reputable Scottish Coutts Family, who was well known for banking. It was in 1840 when Coutts had traveled south to Tyneside to open his own shipyard in an old wooden shipyard at Low Walker on the Tyne. It was at this old wooden shipyard on the Tyne in 1842 that Coutts had built and then launched the famous P.S. Prince Albert; the first iron ship of substantial size to fare the seas and the river Thames.

In 1844, Coutts had built the Q.E.D. in his old shipyard in Tyneside. The Q.E.D. was an Iron-hulled barque ship. The Q.E.D. had an auxiliary engine system—an extremely pioneering system—along with the very innovative feature, and a world's first, of a water ballast; it carried double bottoms. These innovations weren't just for the novelty but would eventually become the norm many different industries especially in the collier trade. The elaborate water ballast had virtually replaced the sand-and-gravel ballasts that were the industry standard previously.

In 1848, Coutts took William Parkinson as a partner and started a new trading company called Coutts and Parkinson; they had a shipyard at Willington Quay. In 1852, their yard built the 900 ton W. S. Lindsay, the largest iron ship that had been built to date for the eponymous merchant William Schaw Lindsay. She was designed to take emigrants to Australia and although she cost one-third more than similar vessels, the ship was three times more efficient with 280 cabins including 60 in first class. The vessel overturned in a storm in The Downs on her maiden voyage with 300 passengers aboard; she had to be towed back to London at a cost of £3,000.

Coutts and Parkinson employed Charles Mitchell as a designer for their ships; Mitchell was considered to be one of the "Three Wise Men" from Aberdeen for the iron ship building industry in Tyneside. Coutts was known for hiring many of his employees from his hometown in Aberdeen: this was especially the case with his venture in Coutts and Parkinson at Willington Quay from the years 1849 through 1855.
