= Hugh Taylor (MP) =

British Member of Parliament and colliery owner

Hugh Taylor (1817–1900) was a British Conservative Party Member of Parliament, a colliery owner with interests in the shipping industry.

== Early life ==
Hugh Taylor was born in Shilbottle in Northumberland in 1817. He was partly educated at the Royal Jubilee School, New Road, Newcastle. His first career as a mariner was short-lived and he became a became a partner in a house of coal factors, in London; and, subsequently, in several very extensive collieries in the North of England, including Haswell, Ryhope, Backworth, Holywell near Seaton Delaval, and East and West Cramlington, as well as in many mines in South Wales.

== Personal life ==
In 1842 Taylor married Mary, the daughter of Thomas Taylor of Cramlington Hall.

In 1862 Taylor bought Chipchase Castle in Northumberland, which in 2014 is still owned by his descendants. (Note: It may well have been his father, also called Hugh Taylor, that bought the estate but this Hugh Taylor was resident from 1870. Research ongoing.) The above Hugh Taylor’s father was John Taylor of Shilbottle, who died in 1825 aged 46. Hugh Taylor (1789-1868; he never married) was the brother of the deceased John Taylor.

== Political career ==
In 1852, he successfully contested the borough of Tynemouth for the Conservative party, defeating Ralph Gray (the sitting Whig MP) by 12 votes. However it was found his supporters had been bribing the voters, and he was duly unseated the following year.

He won the seat in 1859 but it seems his political sympathies were certainly leaning towards the Liberal Party, as he voted with them on a number of issues. Hansard records a couple of contributions to maritime debates. He resigned in 1861 and returned to business.

== George Hudson ==
Taylor and George Elliot were both friends of the Railway King George Hudson. By 1869 Hudson was deeply in debt, in bad health and living in exile, so Taylor and Elliot started a subscription fund which they launched with donations of 100 Guineas each. When this closed it was converted into a trust fund (legally protected from Hudson's creditors) which provided Hudson with an income. Hudson returned to England in 1870, and visited Taylor at Chipchase Castle in April that year.

== Notes ==
Parliament of the United Kingdom
Preceded by Ralph Grey	Member of Parliament for Tynemouth & North Shields; 1852 – 1854	Succeeded by William Schaw Lindsay
Preceded by William Schaw Lindsay	Member of Parliament for Tynemouth & North Shields; 1859 – 1861	Succeeded by Richard Hodgson
