= George Frederick Young =

English shipbuilder and politician

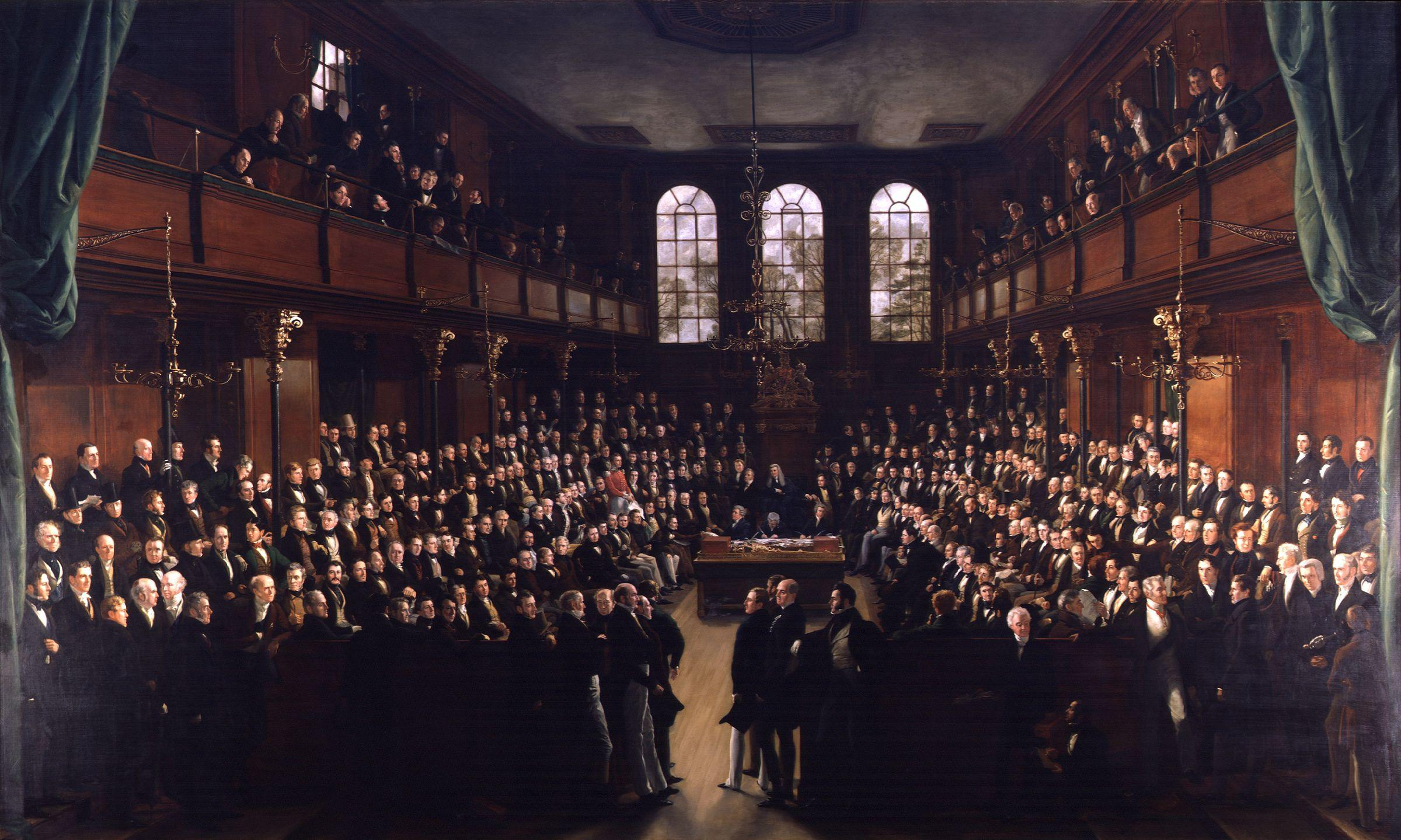
The House of Commons, 1833 by Sir George Hayter

George Frederick Young (1791 - 23 February 1870) was an English shipbuilder and politician.

He was born the second son of Vice-Admiral William Young and his wife Ann Curling, the daughter of a shipbuilder. He became a leading partner in Curling, Young & Co. of London, constructors of East Indiamen and passenger steamships, and later developed interests in Lloyd's and the colonization of New Zealand.

George was Member of Parliament (MP) for Tynemouth and North Shields 1832–1838. He was the first member elected for the newly created constituency in the 1832 general election, and lost his seat to Charles Edward Grey on 23 February 1838 as a result of a petition following the 1837 general election. He was later MP for Scarborough 1851-1852.

His son Sir Frederick Young was a traveller and writer.

Parliament of the United Kingdom
New constituency	Member of Parliament for Tynemouth and North Shields; 1832–1838	Succeeded by Charles Edward Grey
Preceded by John Vanden-Bempde-Johnstone; Earl of Mulgrave	Member of Parliament for Scarborough; 1851–1852; With: John Vanden-Bempde-Johnstone	Succeeded by John Vanden-Bempde-Johnstone; Earl of Mulgrave
