= James Hartley (British politician) =

James Hartley (13 March 1811 – 24 May 1886) was a British Conservative Party politician, and a Glass Manufacturer. He was born in Dumbarton, the elder of the two sons of John Hartley (1775-1833).

He worked with his father and his brother John (1813-1884) as makers of glass. In 1836 he and his brother left Birmingham and commenced business at the Wear Glass Works in Sunderland. His brother John quit this firm in November 1840.

In 1847 he patented a method of manufacturing rolled plate glass for roofing etc.

He was mayor of Sunderland in 1851, 1853, and 1862.

In the 1861 census he described himself as: "Justice of the Peace, Glass Manufacturer, employing 450 men and 100 boys".

He was elected at the 1865 general election as a member of parliament (MP) for Sunderland, and held the seat until he stood down at the 1868 general election.

In 1837 he married Annie, the only daughter of Thomas Blenkinsop of Felling, County Durham.

He died in May 1886 at Portland place in London, leaving a personal estate valued at 147,623 pounds.

Parliament of the United Kingdom
Preceded by William Schaw Lindsay and Henry Fenwick	Member of Parliament for Sunderland; 1865–1868; With: Henry Fenwick 1855–1866; John Candlish 1866–1874	Succeeded by Edward Temperley Gourley and John Candlish
Civic offices
Preceded by William Mordey	Mayor of Sunderland; 1851–1853	Succeeded by Samuel Alcock
Preceded by John Candlish	Mayor of Sunderland; 1862–1863	Succeeded by James Allison
