= List of mayors of Sunderland =

Below is a list of mayors of Sunderland in the United Kingdom (borough from 1836, metropolitan borough from 1974 to 1992 and City of Sunderland from 1992 to present)

== Mayors of Sunderland ==
- 1836-37 Andrew White (Whig)
- 1837-38 Richard Spoor
- 1838-39 Joseph Simpson
- 1839-40 Joseph Brown
- 1840-41 Richard White
- 1841-42 Sir Hedworth Williamson, 7th Baronet
- 1842-43 Andrew White
- 1843-44 Robert Burdon Cay
- 1844-45 James Allison
- 1845-47 Robert Brown
- 1847 Sir Hedworth Williamson, 7th Baronet
- 1847-48 John Scott
- 1848-49 Joseph Simpson
- 1849-50 William Ord
- 1850-51 William Mordey
- 1851-53 James Hartley
- 1853-54 Samuel Alcock
- 1854-56 Anthony John Moore
- 1856-58 George Smith Ranson
- 1858-59 John Candlish (Liberal Party)
- 1859-61 Samuel Alcock
- 1861-62 John Candlish
- 1862-63 James Hartley
- 1863-64 James Allison
- 1864-66 Edward Temperley Gourley
- 1866-67 John James Kayll
- 1867-68 Edward Temperley Gourley
- 1868-69 John Crossley
- 1869-70 William Thompson
- 1870-72 William Nicholson
- 1872-74 Alexander George McKenzie
- 1874-75 John Potts
- 1875-76 John Nicholson
- 1876-78 Samuel Storey
- 1878-79 Samuel Sinclair Robson
- 1879-80 Thomas Scott Turnbull
- 1880 Samuel Storey
- 1880-82 William Wilson
- 1882-84 John Wright Wayman
- 1884-86 Robert Preston
- 1886-88 Edwin Richardson
- 1888-89 George Barnes
- 1889-91 Robert Shadforth
- 1891-93 Stansfield Richardson
- 1893-95 John Sanderson
- 1895-97 William Burns
- 1897-99 William Bruce
- 1899-1900 Edwin Robert Dix
- 1900-02 John George Kirtley
- 1902-04 Henry John Turnbull (Liberal)
- 1904-06 Frederick Foster
- 1906-07 Stephen Moriarty Swan
- 1907-08 William Walker
- 1908-10 Arthur F. Young
- 1910-11 William Sanderson
- 1911-12 Edward Hazard Brown
- 1912-17 Stansfield Richardson
- 1917-19 William Frederick Vint
- 1919-20 Arthur Ritson
- 1920 William Frederick Vint
- 1920-22 Walter Raine
- 1922-24 George Stephenson Lawson
- 1924-26 John Spours Nicholson
- 1926-28 David Cairns
- 1928-30 Isaac Gibson Modlin
- 1930-33 Edward Hazard Brown
- 1933-35 Edward William Ditchburn
- 1935-37 Thomas Summerbell
- 1937-38 James Turner
- 1938 George Ford
- 1938-43 Myers Wayman
- 1943-44 Wilton Legender Milburn
- 1944-45 John Young
- 1945-46 Joshua Ritson
- 1946-47 Miles Walton
- 1947-49 Eden Johnston
- 1949-50 Jacob "Jack" Cohen
- 1950-51 George Henry Morgan
- 1951-52 William Harvey [Labour]
- 1952-53 Arthur Humphrey Suddick
- 1953-54 McGregor Ernest English
- 1954-55 Jane Huggins
- 1955-56 Edith Evelyn Blacklock
- 1956-57 Thomas Henry Cavanagh
- 1957-58 Joseph Hoy
- 1958-59 Edwin Ernest Wales
- 1959-60 Nicholas Lister Allison
- 1960-61 Joseph Tweddle
- 1961-62 Kitty Cohen
- 1962-63 Richard Thomas Weston
- 1963-64 Jane Ellen Hedley
- 1964-65 Robert Wilkinson
- 1965-66 Albert Watson
- 1966-67 Fred Young
- 1967-68 Norman Waters
- 1968-69 John William Purvis Wilkinson
- 1969-70 Mary Elizabeth Miller
- 1970-71 William Ord Stephenson
- 1971-72 William Sinclair Martin
- 1972-73 Leslie Watson
- 1973-74 George Conforth Park
- 1974-75 Tony Burgham|Anthony "Tony" Burgham
- 1975-76 Mary Elizabeth Porter
- 1976-77 Charles Henry Slater
- 1977-78 Thomas Bridges
- 1978-79 Arthur Lumley
- 1979 E Weir
- 1979-81 Leonard Harper
- 1981-82 Thomas Megan Finnigan
- 1982-83 Joseph Hall
- 1983-84 Annie Pratt
- 1984-85 George Elliott
- 1985-86 Ralph Carroll Baxter
- 1986-87 Thomas Scott
- 1987-88 John Mawston
- 1988-89 Leslie Mann
- 1989-90 Robert Kirby
- 1990-91 Andrew Watson Myers
- 1991-92 David Francis Thompson
- 1992-93 William Craddock
- 1993-94 Bryan Charlton
- 1994-95 Denis Gerard Whalen
- 1995-96 Eric Bramfitt
- 1996-97 Ian Galbraith
- 1997-98 Gowan James Scott
- 1998-99 Walter Scott
- 1999-2000 David Ross Wares
- 2000-01 Brian Dodds
- 2001-02 Ken Murray
- 2002-03 Peter Gibson (Labour)
- 2003-04 Juliana Heron (Labour)
- 2004-05 James B Scott (Labour)
- 2005-06 Bill Stephenson(Labour)
- 2006-07 Thomas Foster (Labour)
- 2007-08 Leslie Scott (Labour)
- 2008-09 Mary Smith (Labour)
- 2009-10 Dennis Richardson (Labour)
- 2010-11 Thomas Martin (Labour)
- 2011-12 Norma Wright (Labour)
- 2012-13 Iain Kay (Labour)
- 2013-14 Robert Heron (Labour)
- 2014-15 Stuart Porthouse (Labour until 2019)
- 2015-16 Barry Curran (Labour)
- 2016-17 Alan Emerson (Labour)
- 2017-18 Doris MacKnight (Labour)
- 2018–19 Lynda Scanlan (Labour)
- 2019-21 David Snowdon (Labour)
- 2021-22 Harry Trueman (Labour)
- 2022–23 Alison Smith (Labour)
- 2023-24 Dorothy Trueman (Labour)
- 2024-25 Allison Chisnall (Labour)
- 2025-26 Ehthesham Haque (Labour)
- 2026- Robert Hutchinson (Reform)
