= Tynemouth and North Shields =

Parliamentary constituency in the United Kingdom, 1832–1885

- Former borough constituency for the House of Commons
- County: Northumberland (now Tyne and Wear)

1832–1885
- Seats: One
- Created from: Northumberland
- Replaced by: Tynemouth

Tynemouth and North Shields was a parliamentary borough constituency represented in the House of Commons of the Parliament of the United Kingdom between 1832 and 1885. It elected one Member of Parliament (MP) by the first-past-the-post system of election.

== Boundaries ==
The seat was created by the Reform Act 1832 under the name of Tynemouth. However, in the Parliamentary Boundaries Act 1832, it is referred to as Tynemouth and North Shields.

The constituency was based upon the communities of Tynemouth and North Shields, in the part of the historic county of Northumberland which has, since 1974, been part of the metropolitan borough of North Tyneside in Tyne and Wear. Under the Boundaries Act, its contents were defined as:

The several Townships of Tynemouth, North Shields, Chirton, Preston and Cullercoats.

Tynemouth was incorporated as a municipal borough in 1849 under the Municipal Corporations Act 1835. The borough covered the whole area east of Wallsend and south of Whitley Bay, including the less historic but more economically significant town of North Shields as well as smaller villages such as New York and Cullercoats.

Although there is no formal reference to Tynemouth and North Shields in the Redistribution of Seats Act 1885, it became known as Tynemouth from that time. There was no change to the boundaries.

== Members of Parliament ==
| Election | Member | Party | Note |
|---|---|---|---|
| 1832 | George Frederick Young | Whig | 1837: Unseated on petition |
| 1837 | Charles Edward Grey | Whig | 1837: Declared duly elected on petition |
| 1841 | Henry Mitcalfe | Whig | |
| 1847 | Ralph Grey | Whig | |
| 1852 | Hugh Taylor | Conservative | Unseated and election declared void on petition |
| April 1853 | Writ suspended | | |
| 1854 by-election | William Schaw Lindsay | Whig | 30 March 1854 by-election |
| 1859 | Hugh Taylor | Conservative | April 1861: Resigned |
| 1861 by-election | Richard Hodgson | Conservative | 23 April 1861 by-election |
| 1865 | George Trevelyan | Liberal | |
| 1868 | Thomas Eustace Smith | Liberal | Last MP for the constituency |
Constituency abolished (1885)

Supplemental Note:-

- ^{1} F. W. S. Craig, in his compilations of election results for Great Britain, classifies Whig, Radical and similar candidates as Liberals from 1832. The name Liberal was gradually adopted as a description for the Whigs and politicians allied with them, before the formal creation of the Liberal Party shortly after the 1859 general election.

== Elections ==
=== Elections in the 1830s ===
General election 1832: Tynemouth and North Shields
| Party | Candidate | Votes | % |
|---|---|---|---|
| Whig | George Frederick Young | 326 | 55.3 |
| Whig | Sanderson Ilderton | 264 | 44.7 |
| Majority | | 62 | 10.6 |
| Turnout | | 590 | 77.6 |
| Registered electors | | 760 | |
| Whig win (new seat) | | | |

General election 1835: Tynemouth and North Shields
| Party | Candidate | Votes | % |
|---|---|---|---|
| Whig | George Frederick Young | Unopposed | |
| Registered electors | | 660 | |
| Whig hold | | | |

General election 1837: Tynemouth and North Shields
| Party | Candidate | Votes | % |
|---|---|---|---|
| Whig | George Frederick Young | 269 | 51.5 |
| Whig | Charles Edward Grey | 253 | 48.5 |
| Majority | | 16 | 3.0 |
| Turnout | | 522 | 74.1 |
| Registered electors | | 704 | |
| Whig hold | | | |

- On petition, Young was unseated and Grey was declared elected

=== Elections in the 1840s ===
General election 1841: Tynemouth and North Shields
| Party | Candidate | Votes | % | ±% |
|---|---|---|---|---|
| Whig | Henry Mitcalfe | 295 | 58.1 | +6.6 |
| Conservative | William Chapman | 213 | 41.9 | New |
| Majority | | 82 | 16.2 | +13.2 |
| Turnout | | 508 | 71.7 | −2.4 |
| Registered electors | | 709 | | |
| Whig hold | | Swing | N/A | |

General election 1847: Tynemouth and North Shields
| Party | Candidate | Votes | % | ±% |
|---|---|---|---|---|
| Whig | Ralph Grey | Unopposed | | |
| Registered electors | | 789 | | |
| Whig hold | | | | |

=== Elections in the 1850s ===
General election 1852: Tynemouth and North Shields
| Party | Candidate | Votes | % | ±% |
|---|---|---|---|---|
| Conservative | Hugh Taylor | 340 | 50.9 | New |
| Whig | Ralph Grey | 328 | 49.1 | N/A |
| Majority | | 12 | 1.8 | N/A |
| Turnout | | 668 | 75.7 | N/A |
| Registered electors | | 883 | | |
| Conservative gain from Whig | | Swing | N/A | |

Taylor's election was declared void on petition due to bribery and treating, causing a by-election.

By-election, 30 March 1854: Tynemouth and North Shields
| Party | Candidate | Votes | % | ±% |
|---|---|---|---|---|
| Whig | William Schaw Lindsay | 357 | 51.2 | +2.1 |
| Conservative | Peter Dickson | 340 | 48.8 | −2.1 |
| Majority | | 17 | 2.4 | N/A |
| Turnout | | 697 | 76.8 | +1.1 |
| Registered electors | | 908 | | |
| Whig gain from Conservative | | Swing | +2.1 | |

General election 1857: Tynemouth and North Shields
| Party | Candidate | Votes | % | ±% |
|---|---|---|---|---|
| Whig | William Schaw Lindsay | Unopposed | | |
| Registered electors | | 1,048 | | |
| Whig gain from Conservative | | | | |

General election 1859: Tynemouth and North Shields
| Party | Candidate | Votes | % | ±% |
|---|---|---|---|---|
| Conservative | Hugh Taylor | Unopposed | | |
| Registered electors | | 1,049 | | |
| Conservative gain from Liberal | | | | |

=== Elections in the 1860s ===
Taylor's resignation caused a by-election.

By-election, 23 April 1861: Tynemouth and North Shields
| Party | Candidate | Votes | % | ±% |
|---|---|---|---|---|
| Conservative | Richard Hodgson | 421 | 53.0 | N/A |
| Liberal | Arthur Otway | 374 | 47.0 | New |
| Majority | | 47 | 6.0 | N/A |
| Turnout | | 795 | 74.7 | N/A |
| Registered electors | | 1,064 | | |
| Conservative hold | | | | |

General election 1865: Tynemouth and North Shields
| Party | Candidate | Votes | % | ±% |
|---|---|---|---|---|
| Liberal | George Trevelyan | 494 | 53.0 | N/A |
| Conservative | Richard Hodgson | 438 | 47.0 | N/A |
| Majority | | 56 | 6.0 | N/A |
| Turnout | | 932 | 73.3 | N/A |
| Registered electors | | 1,271 | | |
| Liberal gain from Conservative | | Swing | N/A | |

General election 1868: Tynemouth and North Shields
| Party | Candidate | Votes | % | ±% |
|---|---|---|---|---|
| Liberal | Thomas Eustace Smith | 1,098 | 60.7 | +7.7 |
| Conservative | Henry John Trotter | 710 | 39.3 | −7.7 |
| Majority | | 388 | 21.4 | +15.4 |
| Turnout | | 1,808 | 69.5 | −3.8 |
| Registered electors | | 2,601 | | |
| Liberal hold | | Swing | +7.7 | |

=== Elections in the 1870s ===
General election 1874: Tynemouth and North Shields
| Party | Candidate | Votes | % | ±% |
|---|---|---|---|---|
| Liberal | Thomas Eustace Smith | Unopposed | | |
| Registered electors | | 4,898 | | |
| Liberal hold | | | | |

=== Elections in the 1880s ===
General election 1880: Tynemouth and North Shields
| Party | Candidate | Votes | % | ±% |
|---|---|---|---|---|
| Liberal | Thomas Eustace Smith | 2,844 | 67.1 | N/A |
| Conservative | Henry John Trotter | 1,397 | 32.9 | New |
| Majority | | 1,447 | 34.2 | N/A |
| Turnout | | 4,241 | 73.9 | N/A |
| Registered electors | | 5,736 | | |
| Liberal hold | | Swing | N/A | |

== See also ==
- List of former United Kingdom Parliament constituencies
- History of parliamentary constituencies and boundaries in Northumberland

== Sources ==
- British Parliamentary Election Results 1832-1885, compiled and edited by F.W.S. Craig (The Macmillan Press 1977)
- Who's Who of British Members of Parliament: Volume I 1832-1885, edited by M. Stenton (The Harvester Press 1976)
- Leigh Rayment's Historical List of MPs – Constituencies beginning with "T" (part 2)
