= Sunderland Echo =

UK newspaper serving the areas of Sunderland and East Durham

- Front page from 16 August 2025
- Type: Daily newspaper
- Format: Tabloid
- Owner: National World
- Publisher: National World
- Editor: Print Editor Ian Arkle / Digital Editor Vanessa Sims
- Founded: 22 December 1873 (as The Sunderland Echo and Shipping Gazette)
- Political alignment: Independent
- Language: English
- Headquarters: North East Business & Innovation Centre, Westfield, Enterprise Park East, Sunderland, SR5 2TA
- Circulation: 3,611 (as of 2023)
- Sister newspapers: Hartlepool Mail, Shields Gazette
- Website: sunderlandecho.com

The Sunderland Echo is a daily newspaper serving the Sunderland, South Tyneside and East Durham areas of North East England. The newspaper was founded by Samuel Storey, Edward Backhouse, Edward Temperley Gourley, Charles Palmer, Richard Ruddock, Thomas Glaholm and Thomas Scott Turnbull in 1873, as the Sunderland Daily Echo and Shipping Gazette. Designed to provide a platform for the Radical views held by Storey and his partners, it was also Sunderland's first local daily paper.

The inaugural edition of the Echo was printed in Press Lane, Sunderland on 22 December 1873; 1,000 copies were produced and sold for a halfpenny each. The Echo survived intense competition in its early years, as well as the depression of the 1930s and two World Wars. Sunderland was heavily bombed in World War II and, although the Echo building was undamaged, it was forced to print its competitor's paper under wartime rules. It was during this time that the paper's format changed, from a broadsheet to its current tabloid layout, because of national newsprint shortages.

The Echo is published Monday–Saturday and was formerly part of the Johnston Press group—one of the United Kingdom's largest publishers of local and regional newspapers. As of December 2022, the paper had an average daily circulation of 4,580 The Echo was based at Echo House, Pennywell Industrial Estate, Sunderland, from 1976 until April 2015. The Echo moved to Rainton Meadows Industrial Estate that year and then to the North East Business and Innovation (BIC) Centre at Wearfield, Sunderland, in 2019. In December 2020 it was announced that former Mirror Group chief executive David Montgomery's group National World had acquired JPI Media, which owned the Echo and other newspapers, for £10.2m.

== General overview ==
=== Facts and figures ===
Circulation and price
Year	Price	Circulation
1873	1 halfpenny	1,000
1893	1 halfpenny	21,967
1939	1 penny	49,001
1953	3 halfpennies	56,412
1976	6 pence	65,145
1984	12 pence	70,100
1990	18 pence	68,525
2008	42 pence	44,198
2012	55 pence	29,366
2013	60 pence	22,686
2014	70 pence	18,876
2017	75 pence	11,075
2022	90 pence	4,580

The Sunderland Echo is an evening newspaper, published from Monday to Saturday each week. The paper has a daily circulation of 4,580. The news coverage provided by the Echo focuses mainly on local events, including human interest, crime and court stories, as well as reports on the local football team, Sunderland AFC.

Independent research carried out for the Echo in 2000 found readers spent an average of 33 minutes reading the paper. The same survey showed the Echo appealed to people across the range of demographics, with between 44 and 50% of people in each socio-economic grouping being regular readers.

=== Circulation and supplements ===
The Sunderland Echo covers a circulation area of 40 square miles (100 km^{2}) in North East England, which includes parts of South Tyneside and County Durham, as well as the city of Sunderland. Whitburn, Marsden and The Boldons, all to the north of Sunderland, are among the South Tyneside communities covered. Peterlee, Horden, Seaham, Dawdon, Murton and Seaton, to the south of Sunderland, are the main towns and villages in the East Durham circulation area. The paper is also sold in Washington, Burnmoor and Durham, which are to the west of Sunderland. Villages on the outskirts of the city, including Houghton-le-Spring, Penshaw, Fencehouses, Ryhope and Hetton-le-Hole are included in the circulation area too. The main newspaper rivals in the Sunderland and County Durham area include The Northern Echo, The Journal, the Hartlepool Mail and the Evening Chronicle. The Sunderland Star, a free weekly newspaper printed by the Echo, is also distributed in the city. According to independent research conducted on behalf of the Echo in 2000, the "popularity of the Echo in Sunderland and East Durham is greater than that of all other regional newspapers put together".

In addition to the main newspaper, the Echo also produces a number of regular supplements and articles of specialist interest each week. These include sport and business supplements each Monday, a Down Your Way local news supplement on Tuesdays, jobs, junior football and nostalgia features on Wednesdays, an entertainment supplement, cars guide and nostalgia stories on Thursdays and a property pull-out on Fridays. The Saturday edition includes a leisure pull-out, featuring fashion, entertainment and restaurant reviews, while a local history nostalgia supplement, Retro, is published once a month. Nostalgia calendars, featuring old photographs of Sunderland and Seaham, are also produced.

== Early years ==
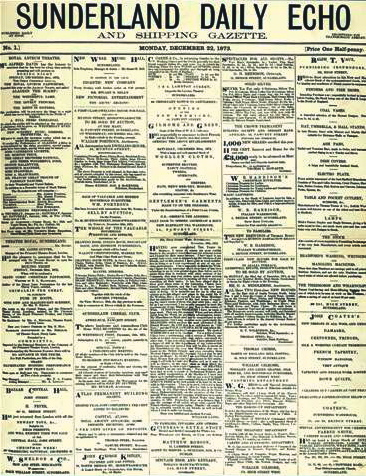
The first edition of the Echo, 22 December 1873

=== Foundation ===
The first edition of the Sunderland Daily Echo and Shipping Gazette was printed on 22 December 1873, on a flat-bed press in Press Lane, Sunderland. Five hundred copies of the four-page issue were produced at noon and 4 pm, and sold for a halfpenny each.

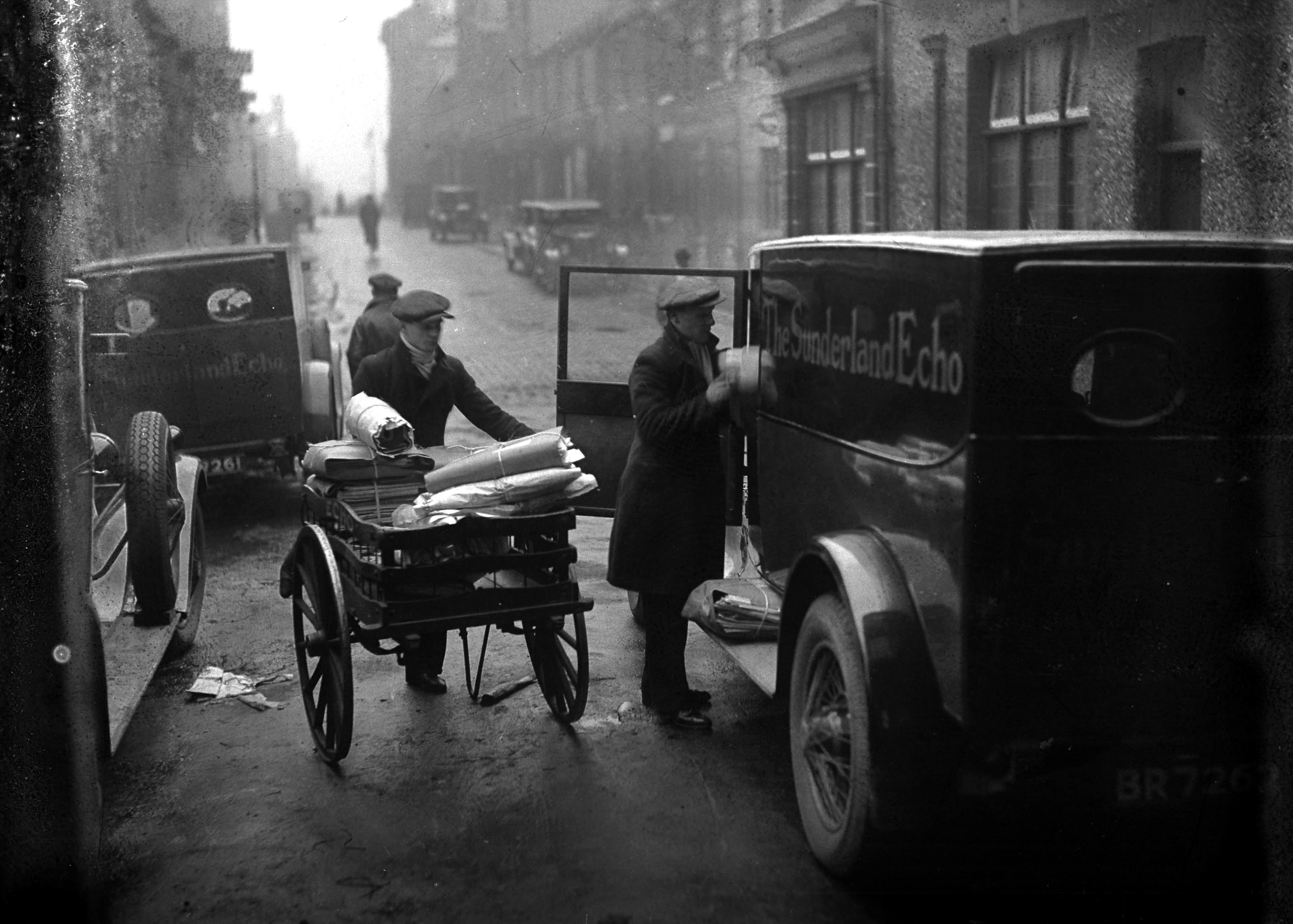
Echo newspapers being loaded into vans at the Bridge Street printing works

Samuel Storey, a former teacher and future Sunderland mayor and Member of Parliament, founded the paper to provide a platform for his political views and to fill a gap in the newspaper market. Although the 100,000-strong population of Sunderland was already served by two weekly newspapers—The Sunderland Times and The Sunderland Herald—neither reflected the radical views held by Storey and his partners and there were no daily papers in the town. Storey promised readers in the first edition that, if things went wrong, "the Echo would try its best to put them right". But he added: "Always with moderation and without esteeming all those who oppose us as fools and knaves." Early copies of the Echo included lengthy reports of Liberal meetings, and critical articles on Liberal opponents.

The Sunderland Echo was launched with an initial investment of £3,500, raised by donations of £500 each from Storey and his business partners. Those joining the venture were Quaker banker Edward Backhouse, shipbroker and MP Edward Temperley Gourley, shipbuilder and MP Sir Charles Palmer, newspaper editor Richard Ruddock, rope-maker Thomas Glaholm and draper Thomas Scott Turnbull. Lack of experience—only Ruddock had previous knowledge of newspaper management—and over-optimistic estimates of costs meant that the initial funds were quickly exhausted. Storey later admitted: "In our childlike, simple ways, we thought this might be sufficient, but in a few months all the money was gone, so we paid in another £3,500 and that soon went too." As the prospect of any great financial success receded, Ruddock, Gourley and Palmer withdrew from the project. Storey, however, remained dedicated to the idea, and took on their shares. A further £7,000 in investment from Storey enabled the remaining partners to abandon the "wheezing flat-bed press" and, in July 1876, the Echo moved to new premises at 14 Bridge Street, Sunderland.

=== Bridge Street ===
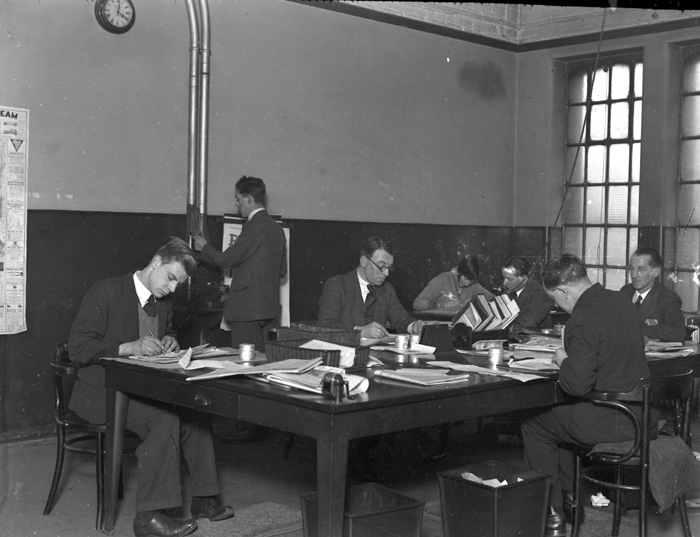
Sub-editors checking facts and news stories at the Bridge Street office in the 1960s

Bridge Street remained the home of the Echo for the next 100 years. Old buildings were demolished, new machine and composing rooms built on West Wear Street and two rotary presses installed just before the move, each capable of printing 24,000 copies an hour. These changes brought about increased circulation, but it took another seven years before the Echo made a profit. It was a time of intense competition; the Sunderland Times converted from a bi-weekly to a daily paper in the same month as the Echo moved to Bridge Street, and Tory supporters started a paper of their own, the Sunderland Daily Post. The Sunderland Times was the first to collapse, but the Post survived for the next quarter of a century, providing the Echo with an often bitter rival.

Following the deaths of two further partners, Backhouse in 1879 and Turnbull in 1880, Storey bought their shares to become the Echo's chief proprietor. A year later, in 1881, he met Scottish-born millionaire Andrew Carnegie, and formed a syndicate with him to set up new newspapers and buy up others. Among those purchased were the Wolverhampton Express and Star, the Northern Daily Mail in Hartlepool and the Portsmouth Evening News. An attempt to buy the Shields Gazette, the country's oldest daily newspaper, failed. The syndicate finally broke up in 1885, with Storey retaining control of the Echo, Hampshire Telegraph, Portsmouth News and the Northern Daily Mail. These papers formed the basis of a new company, Portsmouth and Sunderland Newspapers Ltd, formed in the 1930s. The 19th century ended with the rivalry between the Echo and the Sunderland Daily Post intensifying. The Silksworth Colliery strike of 1891 pitted the two papers against each other, with the Post attacking Storey for having exploited the strike for political gain. Storey successfully sued for libel.

== 20th century ==
=== Consolidation ===
The new century saw the Echo falling behind the times in its production methods. Established as a "leading daily newspaper", it was one of the last to still be setting type by hand in 1900. This changed in 1902, when Linotype lead-setting machines were brought in to set type mechanically. A landslide victory for the Liberal Party followed at the 1906 General Election, which heralded a new era for the Echo. The paper's old rival, the Sunderland Daily Post, was discontinued six months later, and the Football Echo was launched on 7 September 1907.

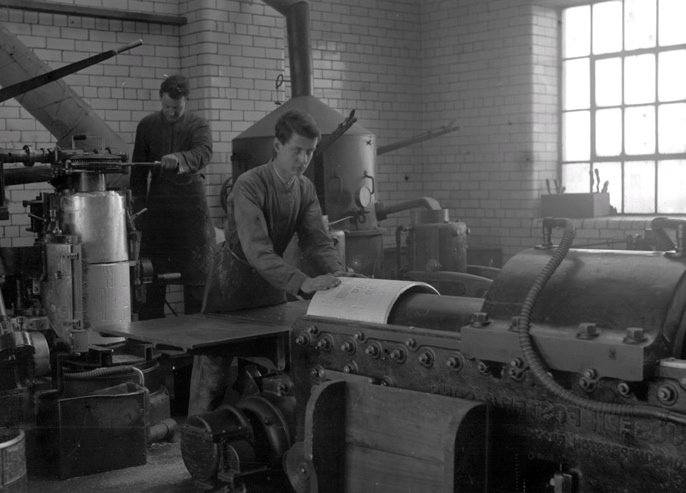
The pre-war days of hot metal newspaper production at the Echo

World War I brought its own difficulties for the Echo. Reporters went off to battle and, after the cost of newsprint soared, the paper was forced to double in price to a penny. The Echo's 50th anniversary in 1923 was marked by a visit from company chairman Samuel Storey. Storey died two years later, three months after his eldest son Fred, and the chairmanship passed to another Samuel—Fred's elder son. In the same year, plans were laid to improve the Bridge Street premises. The work included enlarging the printing works and was completed by the end of the 1920s.

=== Depression years ===
The depression of the 1930s brought mass unemployment to Sunderland. But, for the Echo, it was also a time of important structural changes in ownership. A new company controlling the three titles owned by the Storey family was formed in 1934—Portsmouth and Sunderland Newspapers Ltd. There was a change in name for the Echo too, when the word Daily was dropped from its title of Sunderland Daily Echo and Shipping Gazette. The decade also, however, brought a fire which destroyed most of the bound files of archive copies of the Echo. Nineteenth-century editions of the Echo can only be accessed in Sunderland at the City Centre Library in Fawcett Street.

=== Second World War ===
The Second World War brought havoc to Wearside, with Sunderland one of the seven most heavily bombed towns in the country. Despite the heavy shelling of the North East coast and River Wear, the Echo offices and printing plant escaped undamaged. The Shields Gazette, the Echo's nearest rival, was not as fortunate. Its premises in Chapter Row, South Shields, were bombed in September 1941 and, under an emergency wartime arrangement, the paper was printed on the Echo presses. The Echo continued to be published throughout the war, despite paper rationing, a lack of reporters and a strict censorship of photographs. The war did have one major impact on the Echo—in the form of its size. Wartime restrictions on newsprint reduced the former broadsheet to its present tabloid size, and this style has been retained ever since.

=== Post-war changes and centenary ===
The post-war years saw the Echo drop Shipping Gazette from its main title-piece, following a redesign in 1959. Instead, the paper became known as Echo Sunderland for several years, although the name Sunderland Echo and Shipping Gazette continued to be printed in much smaller type above the new title. A further title-piece redesign in 1972, however, dispensed with the words Shipping Gazette and introduced an illustration of Wearmouth Bridge alongside the title Echo Sunderland.

Following a major refurbishment of the Bridge Street base in the mid-1960s, the next milestones for the paper came in 1973. The first was Sunderland A.F.C.'s 1–0 win over Leeds United in the FA Cup final. Ian Porterfield's winning goal was headline news at the time, giving the Echo its all-time record circulation figure of 95,000 copies of the Sports Echo. The second important event of 1973 was the 100th anniversary of the paper. Celebrations included a birthday party, with dignitaries such as Sunderland A.F.C. manager Bob Stokoe among the guests. Lord Buckton, the chairman of Portsmouth and Sunderland Newspapers Ltd, announced his retirement at the event, and was succeeded by his son, The Honourable Richard Storey. News of a move from Bridge Street to Pennywell, Sunderland, was also announced during the anniversary celebrations. The old newspaper building has since been replaced by a modern apartment block. The Echo name still lives on, however, as the project has been named Echo24.

== Modern era ==
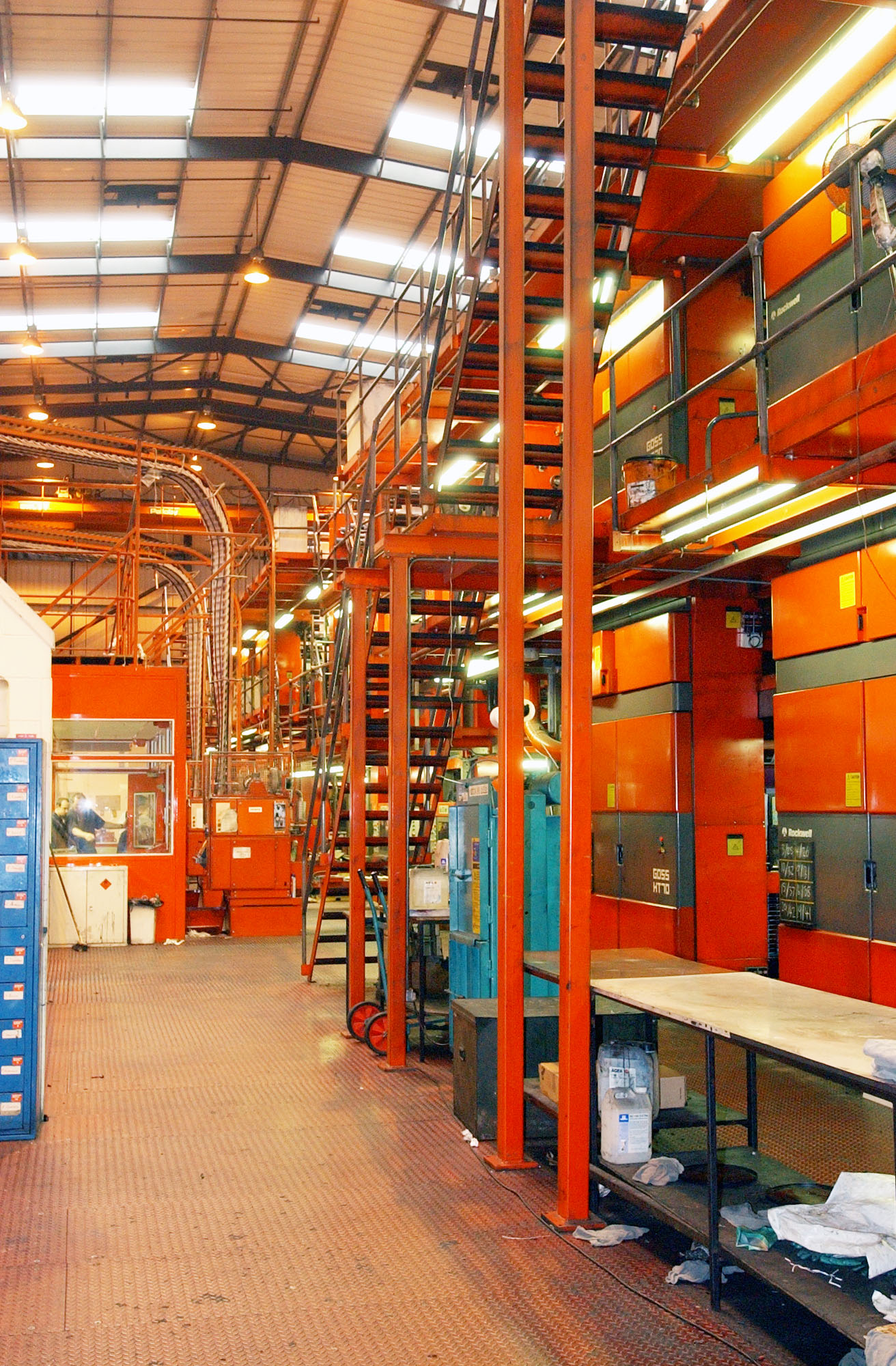
The Echo press in 2006

=== Decades of change ===
The Echo moved from Bridge Street to a purpose-built newspaper office at Echo House, Pennywell Industrial Estate, in 1976. The move brought an end to the traditional methods of printing using hot molten metal to produce type and printing plates, and introduced computer technology. The £4 million development saw the Echo become the first daily newspaper in the North East to be completely produced by photo-composition and web-offset printing. It also saw a change in the Echo's appearance, with a new shape, bolder typefaces and clearer printing. The first new-look Echo was printed at Pennywell on 26 April 1976 and was issue number 32,512.

Another change inspired by the move was a return for the Football Echo man. The cartoon character had for years indicated the match results of Sunderland with a smile, a frown or a tear, while adorning the outside wall of the Bridge Street building. After several years in storage, he was returned to the wall of the new Echo building in 1976, where he still remains today.

In 1985 there was a break in tradition when the Echo title-piece appeared reversed out in white on a red background, instead of the more familiar red or black lettering. The new title-piece was designed to give a greater impact to the colourful front page. It was the first in a series of changes which included dropping Sunderland from the title in 1990, the paper simply becoming The Echo. This change was reversed in 1997, with a return to the name Sunderland Echo.

=== Technological changes ===
The 1990s saw the Echo take a huge technological leap forward when a £12 million printing press was installed. It was used for the first time in December 1996 and was capable of printing up to 70,000 newspapers an hour. The press was part of a multimillion-pound revamp, which also saw journalists making up full news pages on computer screens for the first time. The Echo's first internet news service was also launched in 1996. A further £5 million was spent on updating the pre-press and press hall area in 2004, to improve printing quality and speed of production.

The Echo was still part of Portsmouth and Sunderland Newspapers until the end of the 1990s, although printed by Northeast Press, a subsidiary of the main company. However, the last link to the original founder, Samuel Storey, disappeared in 1999, when Johnston Press took over the business in May that year. The Sunderland Echo is still published by Northeast Press, although Johnston Press—the nation's second largest regional publisher—now owns the whole company. In September 2012 it was announced the multimillion-pound press hall was to close, with the loss of 81 jobs, and printing operations moved to Sheffield. On Saturday, 3 November, the final Echo was printed in Sunderland. The Echo was based at Echo House, Pennywell Industrial Estate, Sunderland, from 1976 until April 2015.

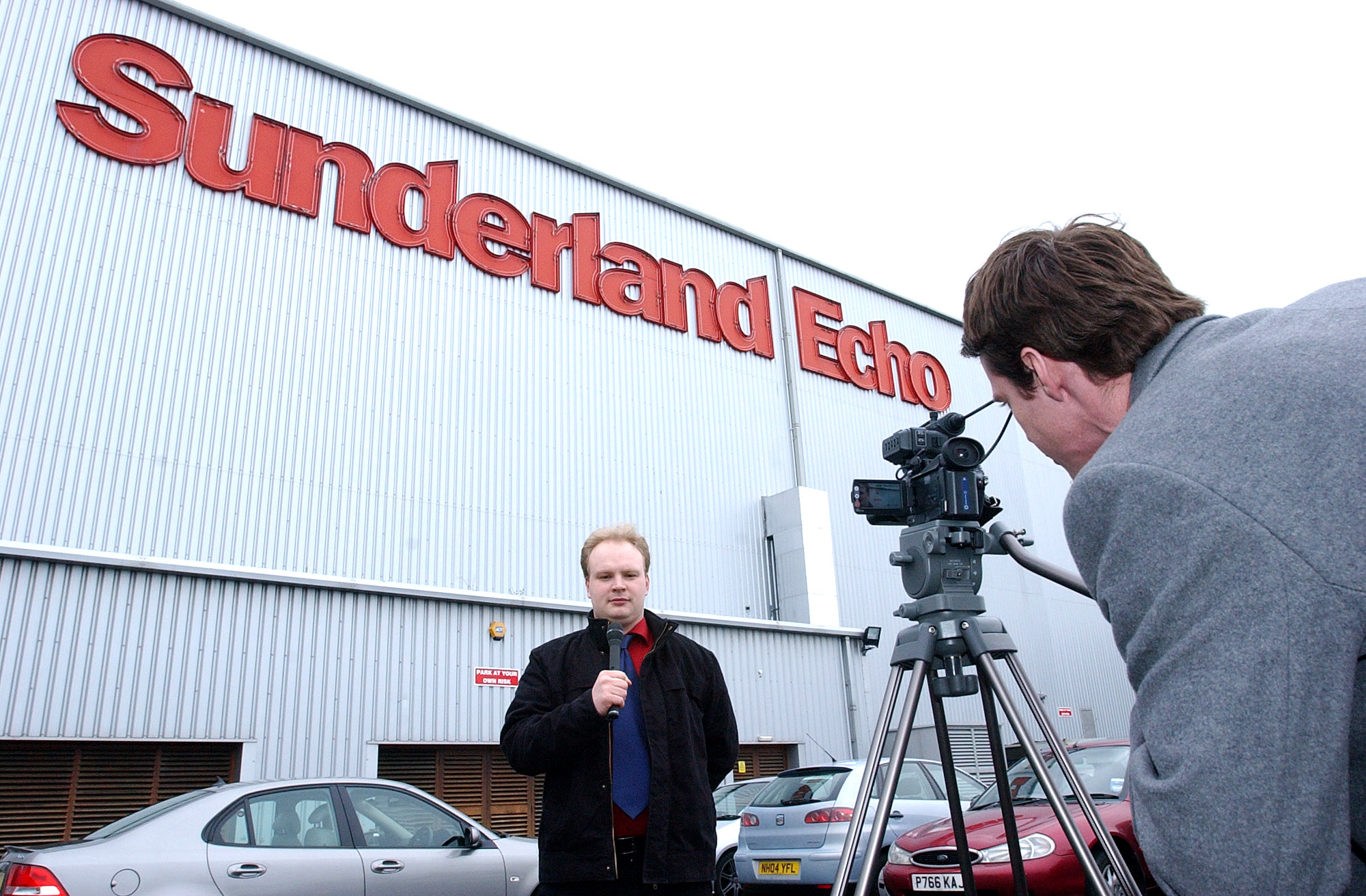
Echo digital journalists at work

=== Online revolution ===
The Echo's new-look website was launched in February 2007, while a digital editing suite was created within the office at the same time. The audio-visual equipment allows reporters to both write about and film stories as they happen, and the articles can be published on-line within seconds.

Statistics show that almost 80,000 people visited the Echo's website in January 2007, and this figure rose to 216,000 by January 2008. The website is updated 24 hours a day, seven days a week, with stories including football match reports and football transfer rumours among the most popular. Slideshows, videos and podcasts are also included on the site in addition to the news of the day.

== Awards and recognition ==
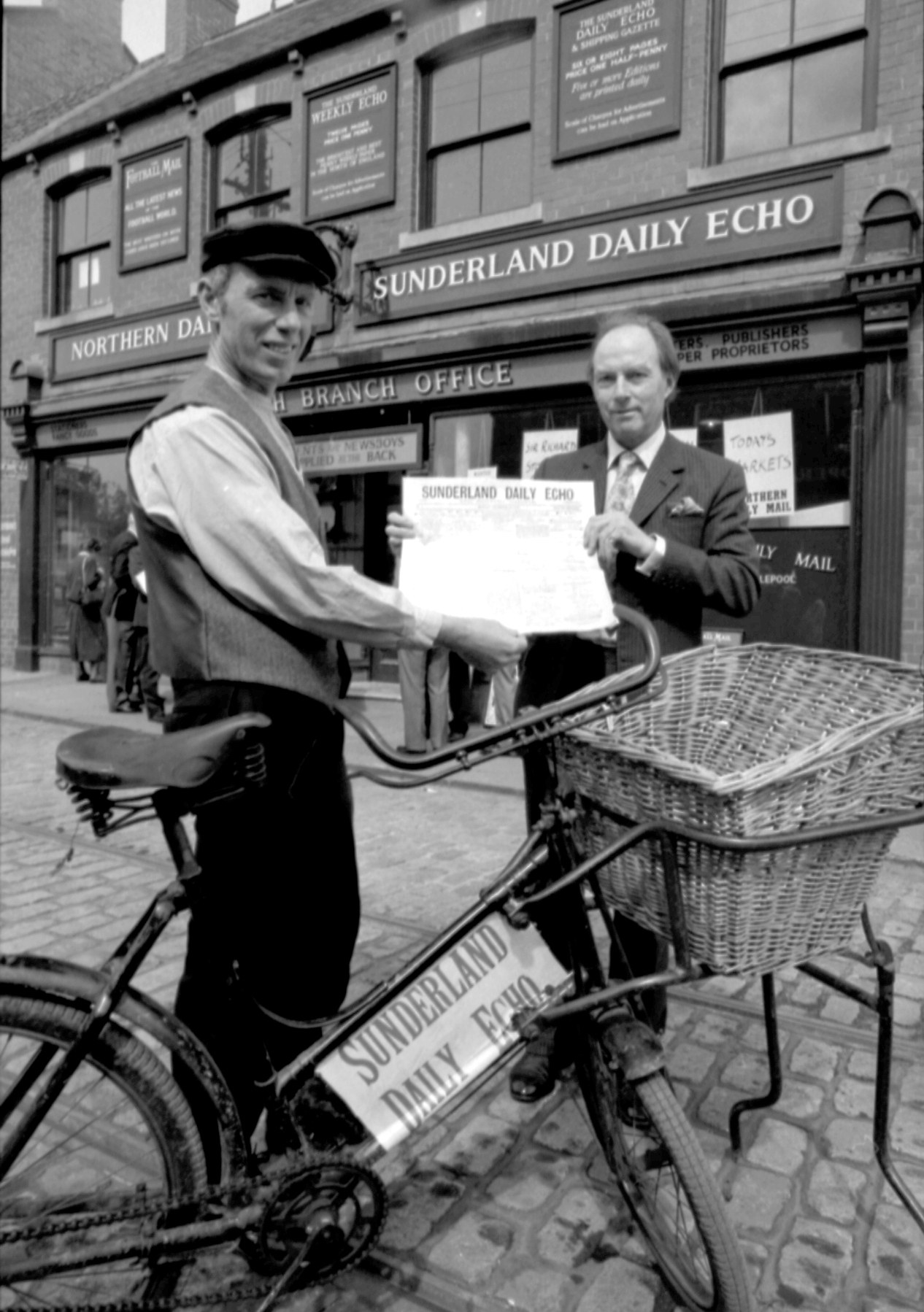
Sir Richard Storey opens the Echo exhibit at Beamish

The Echo has won numerous accolades, as well as government praise, for its campaigning journalism, specialist writing, community work, photographic images and appeals for good causes over the decades. Examples of notable writing include a 2006 campaign highlighting the threat posed by bogus callers to the elderly and a 2005 campaign to protect 999 crews from being attacked on duty, which both received official praise in Parliament. A 1996 drug education campaign, which included the creation of a telephone service for tip-offs about suspected local drug dealers, was also highly praised. The Newspaper Society named the Echo as its Campaigning Newspaper of the Year for the Drug Busters drive, and the campaign also won an award from the International Newspaper Marketing Association.

In the 135 years of its existence, the Echo has become part of the culture of the North East of England and a replica branch office of the Sunderland Daily Echo and Shipping Gazette was built at the open air Beamish Museum in County Durham in 1991. Designed to show visitors how the newspaper would have operated in around 1913, the life-size exhibit includes a distribution office, reporter's office, stationery shop and fully working printing press. The replica office took museum staff several months to research and create, and was opened by Sir Richard Storey, great-grandson of Echo founder Samuel Storey, on 10 May 1991.

A racehorse was named after the paper in 1991, which was owned by a consortium of 250 Echo readers. The gelding won races at Hamilton, Redcar, Newcastle upon Tyne and Haydock in the early 1990s, but had to be put down on 17 February 1996 after pulling up badly lame during a routine morning gallop. The Echo was also used in a display at the Science Museum in London in 1999, to show how writing can be made simpler for people with reading difficulties, and a specially printed edition of the newspaper appeared on the TV show Touching Evil, starring Robson Green, in the same year.

Awards won by the Sunderland Echo
Year	Award	Person(s)	Work
2008 Northeast Press Awards	Trainee of the Year (Daily paper)	Ross Robertson	Best general news reporting portfolio from a trainee
2008 Northeast Press Awards	Best Columnist	Richard Ord	The Richard Ord Column
2008 Northeast Press Awards	Best Feature Writer (Daily paper)	Linda Colling	Women's features and weekly columnist
2008 Northeast Press Awards	Best Online Contribution	Lee Hall	Sunderland Echo website
2008 Northeast Press Awards	Best portfolio of pictures/Best Picture	Tony Colling	Best general news photography portfolio
The 2005/06 Tom Cordner North East Press Awards	Tom Cordner Quill: Trainee journalist of the Year	Bethany Usher	Best general news reporting portfolio from a trainee
The 2005/06 Tom Cordner North East Press Awards	North East Health Prize	Linda Colling	Best portfolio of health stories
The 2005/06 Tom Cordner North East Press Awards	The Steve Jones Prize For reporting that contributes most to the community	Rob Lawson – Editor	Best community stories reporting portfolio
The 2004/05 Tom Cordner North East Press Awards	Consumer Affairs Prize	Andrea Thurlbeck	Best general consumer reporting portfolio
The 2004/05 Tom Cordner North East Press Awards	The Steve Jones Prize For reporting that contributes most to the community	John Howe	Best community stories reporting portfolio
The 2004/05 Tom Cordner North East Press Awards	ABC Spike for overall newspaper page design	Les Oliver	Best design sub-editing portfolio
The 2004/05 Tom Cordner North East Press Awards	Eric Dobson Scroll	Bethany Usher	North East trainee with highest marks in the NCTJ examination
