= John Candlish =

British politician

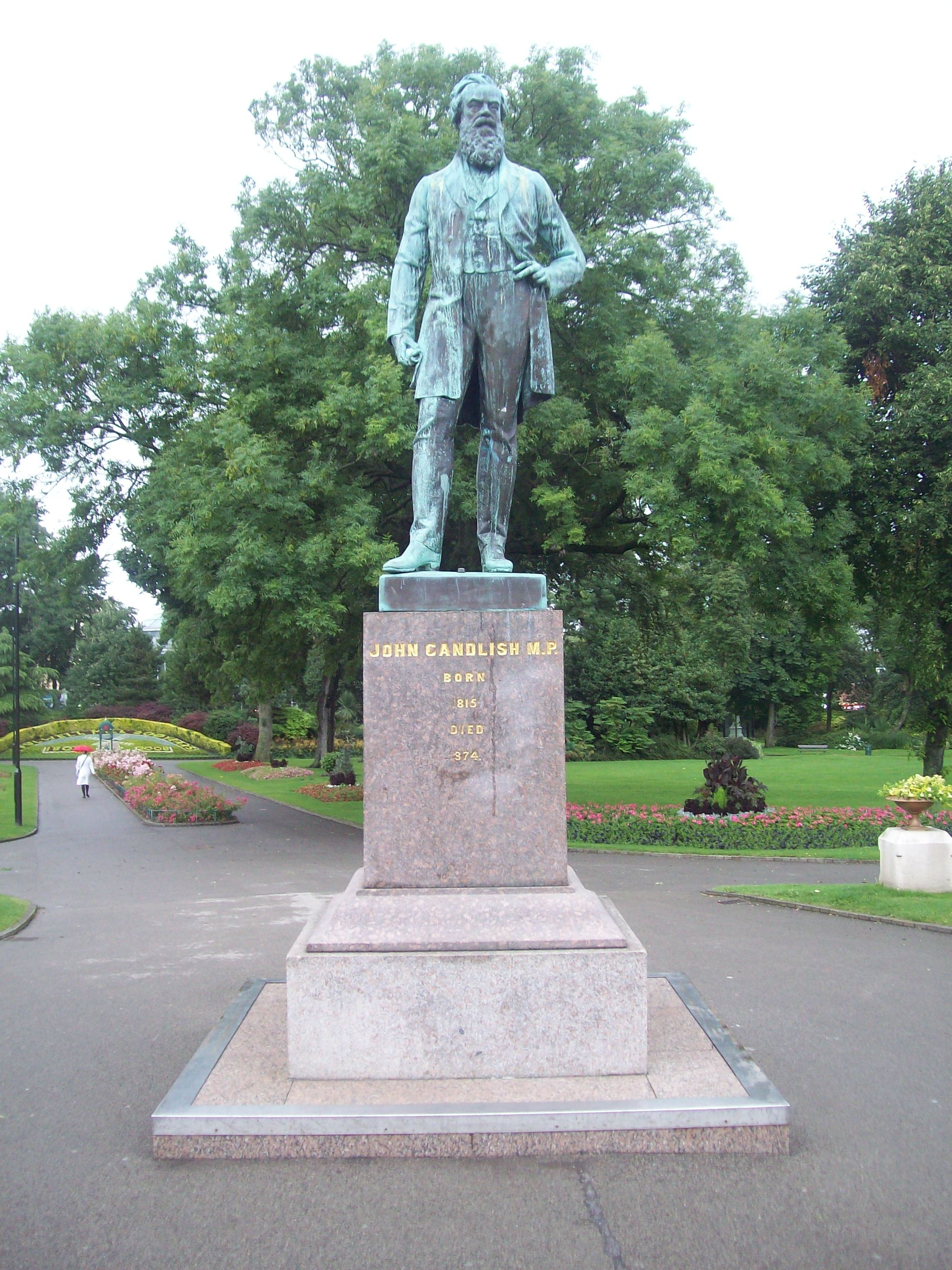
- The statue of John Candlish in Mowbray Park, Sunderland

Member of Parliament for Sunderland
- In office 1866–1874
- Preceded by: Henry Fenwick
- Succeeded by: Sir Henry Havelock-Allan, Bt

Personal details
- Born: 1815 Tarset, Northumberland, England
- Died: 17 March 1874 Cannes, France
- Party: Liberal
- Relatives: William Shepherd Allen (son-in-law); Stephen Allen (grandson); William Allen (grandson); John Manchester Allen (great-grandson)
- Occupation: Glass bottle manufacturer

John Candlish (bapt. 28 April 1816 – 17 March 1874) was a British glass bottle manufacturer and Liberal Party politician.

== Early life ==
Candlish was born in Tarset, Northumberland, the eldest son of farmer John Candlish and Mary, née Robson. After Mary died in 1820, Candlish senior moved the family to Sunderland where he found work at Ayres Quay bottleworks, managed by his brother, Robert.

Candlish was educated at local Dissenter schools and then at an academy in North Shields before returning to Sunderland, aged eleven, to work in the bottleworks. Aged fourteen, his uncle secured him an apprenticeship as a draper and he began to study the French language and joined a debating society.

== Early career ==
In 1836, Candlish became a partner in a drapery business, and later that year purchased the newspaper, Sunderland Beacon, but it failed within six months. Other short-lived ventures followed into coal exporting and shipbuilding at Southwick in 1844. In 1851, he returned to publishing by founding Sunderland News and was a secretary at the Sunderland Gas Company.

== Bottle works ==
A turning point came to Candlish's career in 1855 when he acquired the lease of Seaham Bottle Works at Seaham harbour with his childhood friend, Robert Greenwell. He later bought out his partner and patronage was given by nearby resident Frederick Stewart, 4th Marquess of Londonderry, and the works renamed Londonderry Bottle Works, becoming the largest bottling business in Europe. Candlish purchased a site at Diamond Hall in Millfield and by 1872, had six glasshouses located in Seaham and four in Millfield.

== Politics ==
In 1848, Candlish had been elected to Sunderland Borough Council and was mayor of the town in 1858 and 1861 and held other public offices as a river commissioner, magistrate, chairman of the board of guardians and principal of the Sunderland Orphan Asylum.

Candlish contested for one of Sunderland's two parliamentary seats at the 1865 general election but was defeated by Henry Fenwick and James Hartley. Fenwick's resignation a year later brought success for Candlish in the subsequent by-election. He held the seat until he stood down from the House of Commons at the 1874 general election.

== Family ==
In 1845, Candlish married his first cousin Elizabeth Candlish (the daughter of his uncle, Robert). She died on 21 March 1900, aged 86. Their daughter, Elizabeth Penelope, later married politician William Shepherd Allen.

== Death and legacy ==
Candlish undertook a parliamentary visit to India in 1870 (where he, incidentally, was presented with a bottle of beer manufactured by his own company), a trip which was blamed for the subsequent breakdown of his health. He died on 17 March 1874 in Cannes, France, and is buried in Sunderland Cemetery (Ryhope Road, Sunderland). In 1875, a statue of Candlish by Charles Bacon was unveiled in the centre of Mowbray Park and John Candlish Road, near his glassworks at Diamond Hall, is named after him.

Parliament of the United Kingdom
| Preceded by Henry Fenwick and James Hartley | Member of Parliament for Sunderland; 1866–1874; With: James Hartley 1865–1868; Edward Temperley Gourley 1868–1874 | Succeeded by Edward Temperley Gourley and Sir Henry Havelock-Allan, Bt |
Civic offices
| Preceded by George Smith Ranson | Mayor of Sunderland; 1856-1858 | Succeeded by Samuel Alcock |
| Preceded by Samuel Alcock | Mayor of Sunderland; 1861-1862 | Succeeded by James Hartley |
