= 1843 in rail transport =

This article lists events related to rail transport that occurred in 1843.

== Events ==
=== January events ===
- January 3 – The Great Western Railway of England officially opens its Swindon Works.
- January 28 – Boston and Maine Railroad and Eastern Railroad reach an agreement to both lease the Portland, Saco and Portsmouth Railroad as a joint line to Portland, Maine.

=== February events ===
- February 23 – Boston and Maine Railroad extends its line to Agamenticus.
- February 25 – The Grand Duke of Hesse and Grand Duke of Baden in present-day Germany agree to construct the Main-Neckar-Eisenbahn from Heidelberg to a connection with the state railway in Baden.

=== July events ===
- July – The Leeds and Bradford Railway, in West Yorkshire, England, obtains its Act of Parliament.

=== October events ===
- October – Horatio Allen succeeds William Maxwell as president of the Erie Railroad.
- October 15 – Official opening of first continuous international railway line between Antwerp, Belgium and Köln, Prussia (third day of the opening festivities, covering the Liège (Belgium)–Köln part), making Herbesthal railway station the first international border station in the world.

=== November events ===
- November 1 – The earliest ancestor of the Rutland Railroad, the Rutland & Burlington Railroad, is chartered by the state of Vermont.

=== Unknown date events ===
- John Cooke, future founder of Cooke Locomotive Works, is promoted to superintendent at American steam locomotive manufacturing company Rogers Locomotive and Machine Works.

== Births ==
=== February births ===
- February 3 – William Cornelius Van Horne, oversaw the major construction of the Canadian Pacific Railway, youngest superintendent of Illinois Central Railroad (d. 1915).
- February 27 – Thomas Lowry, president of Minneapolis Street Railway 1877–1892, president of Twin City Rapid Transit, president of Soo Line Railroad 1889–1890 and 1892–1909 (d. 1909).

=== July births ===
- July 15 – Thomas Fletcher Oakes, president of Northern Pacific Railway 1888–1893 (d. 1919).

=== August births ===
- August 25 – Inoue Masaru, Japanese bureaucrat, first Director of Railways (d. 1910).

=== November births ===
- November 27 – Cornelius Vanderbilt II, president of New York Central railroad (d. 1899).
