= HMS Active (1845) =

Frigate of the Royal Navy

History

United Kingdom
- Name: HMS Active
- Launched: 19 July 1845
- Renamed: HMS Tyne, July 1867; HMS Durham, November 1867
- Fate: Sold, 1908

General characteristics
- Class & type: Pique-class frigate
- Tons burthen: 1,627 tons bm
- Armament: 36 guns

HMS Active was a 36-gun Pique-class fifth-rate frigate launched in 1845, becoming a training ship in 1863 and being renamed HMS Tyne and then HMS Durham in 1867. She was captained by Captain Byles in 1879, when members of the crew appeared on stage at the Lyceum Theatre in the play Jack Crawford by James Roland MacLaren. She was sold in 1908.
