= James Roland MacLaren =

Scottish actor and playwright

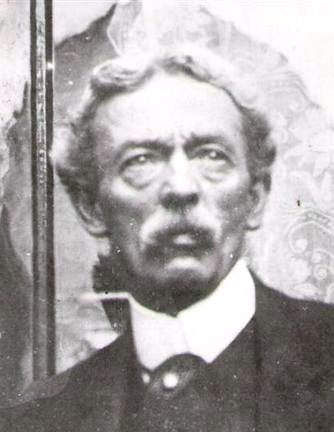
James Roland MacLaren circa 1897

James Roland MacLaren (10 June 1839 – 30 June 1912) was a Scottish actor and playwright.

== Biography ==
MacLaren was born in Bonhill, Dunbartonshire to Archibald MacLaren and Anne McIntyre. The family later moved to Liverpool, where James Roland MacLaren first took to the stage, appearing second to Barry Sullivan, the well known Victorian actor. He subsequently went to Sunderland with Alfred Davis where he took over the New Royal Lyceum Theatre (now demolished). It was here with MacLaren that the actor Sir Henry Irving made his first stage appearances before moving to London where he later became famous as the inspiration for Bram Stoker's Count Dracula. For some thirty years MacLaren was renowned in the north east of England as an actor in stock companies, a noted recitalist and a playwright. He usually played heavy villain roles and was popular amongst the audience as the 'traitor'.

His most noted work is arguably the play Jack Crawford the Hero of Camperdown, a dramatisation of the story depicting the heroic actions of Jack Crawford during the Battle of Camperdown in 1797. He also wrote the play, The Cauld Lad O'Hylton, a story of the ghost of Hilton Castle.

== Jack Crawford and the play ==
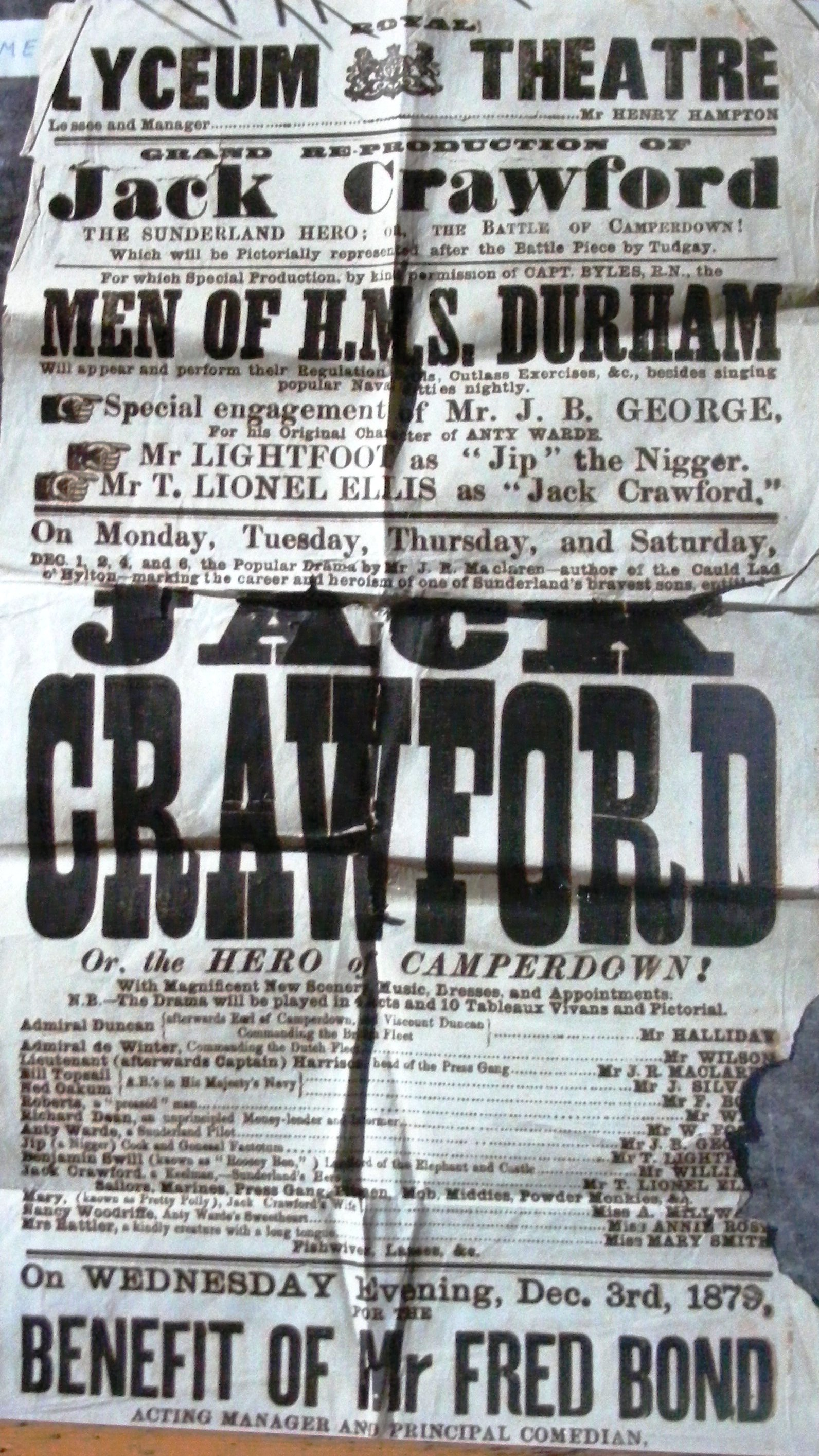
Poster advertising the Jack Crawford play at the Lyceum in December 1879

In part through popularity of the play which toured England in 1879, the actions of Crawford became more widely recognised and a statue of him was built almost 60 years after his death in Mowbray Park. Commemorative mugs and earthenware fired at Balls Pottery Sunderland in 1890 were inscribed with verse from the play:

At Camperdown, we fought, and when at worst the fray,
our mizzen near the top boys, was fairly shot away.
The foe, thought we had struck, but Jack cried out "Avast"
and the colours of Old England, he nail'd up to the mast

Notable actors in the Royal Lyceum Theatre production of 1879 included:

Mr T Lionel Ellis as Jack Crawford
Mr JB George as Anty Warde
Mr T Lightfoot as Jip
Mr Halliday as Admiral Duncan
Mr Wilson as Admiral de Winter
James Roland MacLaren played Lt Harrison, head of the press gang
The crew of the Royal Naval drill ship, HMS Durham (formerly known as HMS Active), also performed in the play

== Private life ==
James Roland MacLaren married the singer Isabella Carr (1848–1928) in 1868 with whom he had eight children. They lived at 22 St Vincent Street in Sunderland until his death from asthma. He was buried in Sunderland Cemetery.
