= Mowbray Park =

Park in Sunderland, United Kingdom

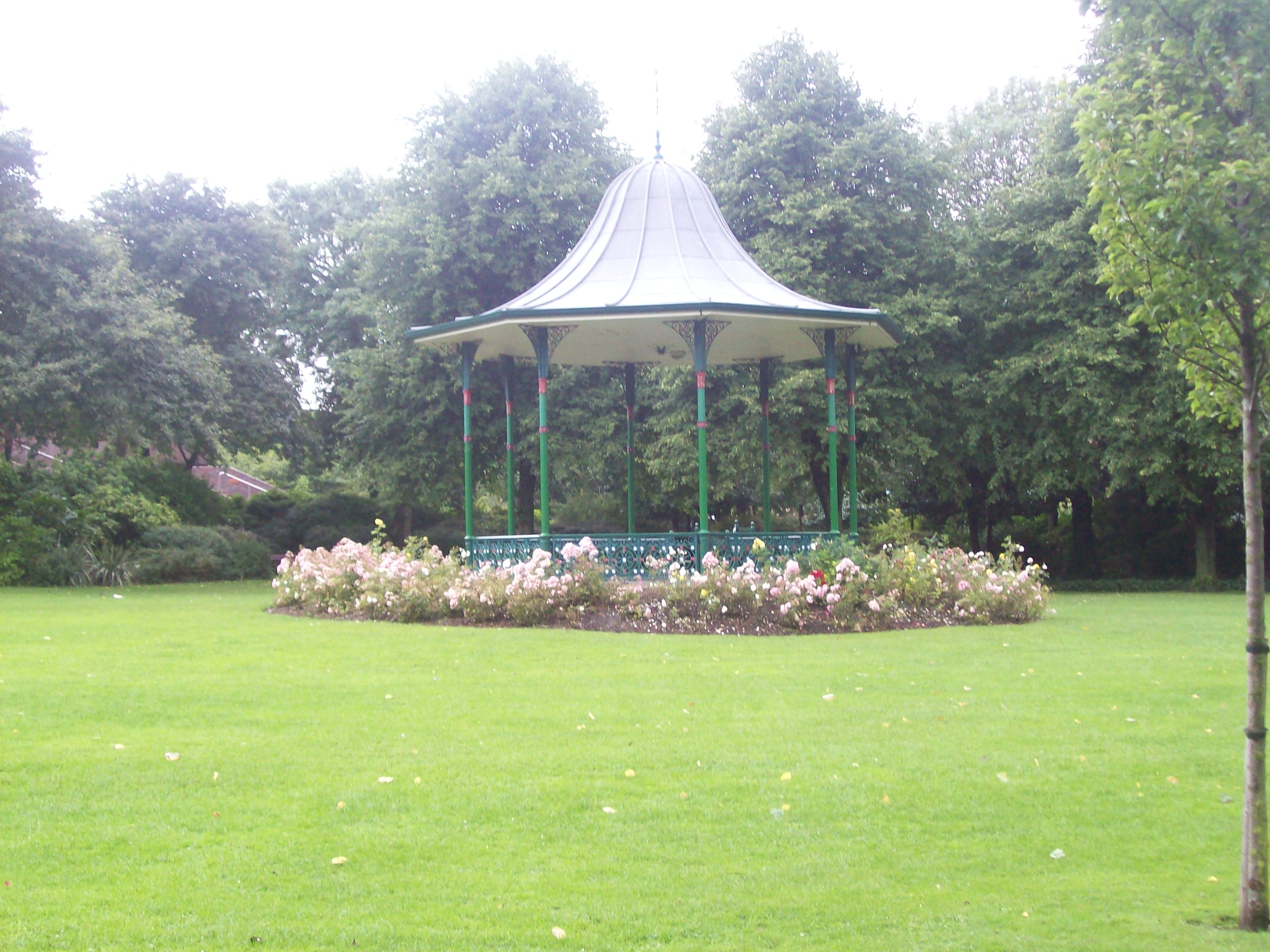
- The bandstand in Mowbray Park

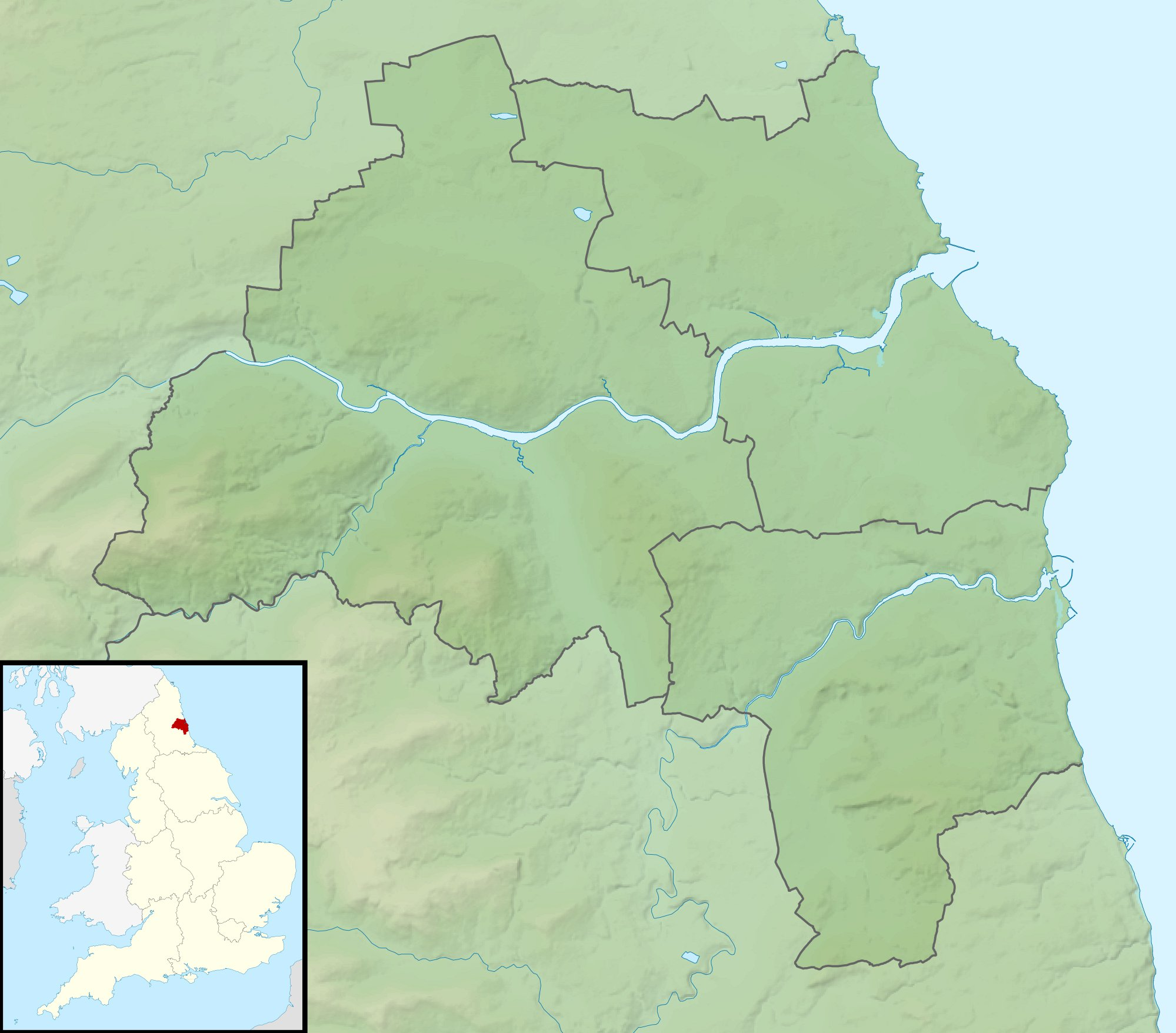
- Location within Tyne and Wear
- Interactive map of Mowbray Park
- Type: Municipal
- Location: Sunderland, England
- Coordinates: 54°54′7″N 1°22′47″W
- Created: 1857; 169 years ago
- Operator: Sunderland City Council
- Status: Open all year

Mowbray Park is a municipal park in the centre of Sunderland, Tyne and Wear, England, located a few hundred yards from the busy thoroughfares of Holmeside and Fawcett Street and bordered by Sunderland Museum and Winter Gardens to the north, Burdon Road to the west, Toward Road to the east and Park Road to the south. The park was voted best in Britain in 2008.

== History ==
Mowbray Park is one of the oldest municipal parks in North East England.

The roots of Mowbray Park date back to the 1830s, when a health inspector recommended building a leafy area in the town after Sunderland recorded the first cholera epidemic in 1831. A grant of £750 was provided by the Government to buy a £2,000 plot of land from the Mowbray family for a new park.

Work on Mowbray Park – then known as The People's Park – began in the mid-1850s, incorporating a former limestone quarry set within what was known as Building Hill. It appears that spoil heaps were shaped and mounded to create distinctive paths amongst steep sided hummocks. The effect was to afford the Victorian user plenty of opportunity to perambulate within a relatively small green area.

The park was opened by John Candlish, later Mayor of and MP for Sunderland, on 21 May 1857.

On the day of the park's opening on 12 May 1857, shops closed early as thousands of people flocked to attend the ceremony. An extension to Mowbray Park, from the railway cutting to Borough Road, was opened on 11 July 1866.

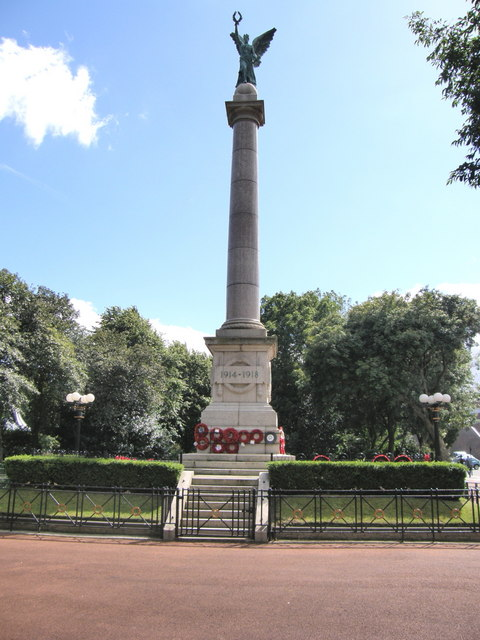
Sunderland War Memorial located just outside the park

It was opened in 1857 in response to a demand for more open spaces in the town. The land was purchased from the Mowbray family, and named after them in recognition. The park was extended in 1866 to include a lake and a terrace, and in 1879 the Winter Gardens, museum and art gallery were added along the Borough Road side.

The Second World War affected the park; It was hit with numerous German bombs, the iron structures – most notably the Winter Gardens, a cast iron bridge, and the bandstand – were taken away to be melted down for weapons, and the open spaces were converted into vegetable patches.

Following the war, the park fell into neglect. Sunderland Civic Centre was built on the west portion of the park. The area became known for anti-social and abusive behaviour, and was considered generally unsafe. In August 1993, over £13,000 worth of damage was caused, and a survey by the Sunderland Echo showed that locals were too scared to use the park.

Following a public campaign, in 1994 work began on restoring the park to its Victorian glory, funded by a £3.3 million grant from the Heritage Lottery Fund, described as: "The jewel in the crown of the city centre regeneration". The Sunderland Museum and Winter Gardens were rebuilt, the lake was restored, the bandstand was rebuilt, and the park was re-shaped and adorned with new artworks. A large adventure play area for children was built, to an "Alice Through The Looking Glass Theme" featuring a distorted giant chequer board and giant chess pieces. The park officially re-opened in 2000.

In the first year following re-opening, the park received over 800,000 visitors, making it the most visited attraction outside London.

== Structures ==
=== William Hall Drinking Fountain ===
The cast iron drinking fountain was constructed by Glenfield and Kennedy of Kilmarnock and erected in 1878 by the Manchester Unity of Oddfellows. It is a memorial to William Hall, who was the oldest Oddfellow in the North of England when he died, aged 75, in 1876. The domed canopy has elaborate foliage and four cupsed arches on the columns, which shelter the bollard-shaped drinking fountain. Above each arch is an escutcheon and motto: on the north and south is "Keep the pavement dry" and "Nil desperandum auspice deo 1878" (the motto on the Coat of arms of Sunderland) with symbols of the Borough of Sunderland and of Oddfellows.; on the east and west is "Amicitia Amor et Veritas" (the motto of Oddfellows), "In memory of Wm. Hall PPGM of the Sunderland District Independent Order of Oddfellows" and "Presented to the Corporation of Sunderland by the Oddfellows NU". The fountain was repaired and restored with the re-opening of Mowbray Park in 2000.

=== Victoria Hall disaster memorial ===
Mowbray Park was the original site of the memorial for the Victoria Hall disaster of 1883 in which 183 children were trampled to death in the Victoria Hall, which overlooked Mowbray Park. The marble statue of a mother holding her dead child was later moved to Bishopwearmouth Cemetery, but in 2002 it was restored and moved back to the park.

=== Statue of Henry Havelock ===
The Havelock statue, constructed in 1861, is located on Building Hill at the south of the park and commemorates Sir Henry Havelock, a celebrated military general born in Bishopwearmouth. Either side of the statue are cannons, named Joshua and Caleb, replicas of those captured from the Russians during the Crimean War. The originals were melted down for metal during the Second World War.

The over life-sized bronze figure of Havelock in military uniform and a sword in his hand is on a high stepped based and a tall, square, granite plinth and faces toward his birthplace. The figure is signed 1861 by Behnes and the founder's mark on the rear of plinth reads: "The Statue Foundry, Pimlico, London". The inscription on the front of the plinth reads: "Born 5 April 1775 at Ford Hall, Bishopwearmouth. Died 24 November 1857 at Dil Koosha, Lucknow". There is a statue of Havelock by the same sculptor in Trafalgar Square, London.

=== Statue of Jack Crawford ===
Jack Crawford, born in Sunderland, was honoured for bravery when he climbed the mast of his ship, HMS Venerable, during the Battle of Camperdown to nail the British flag back up. Although he died a pauper (he was also the second victim of the cholera epidemic in Britain), a memorial statue was erected for him in 1890.

The monument is signed and dated "Percy Wood fecit 1889–90". The life size, bronze figure of Crawford is on a granite plinth set on a mound of magnesian limestone. Crawford is in seaman's dress nailing a flag to the mast, using a pistol butt as hammer. The irregularly-piled pieces of limestone rock support the plinth which has an inscription on its north side: "The sailor who so heroically nailed Admiral Duncan's flag to the main-top-gallant-mast of HMS Venerable in the glorious action off Camperdown on October 11, 1797. Jack Crawford was born at the Pottery Bank, in Sunderland, 1775 and died in his native town in 1831 aged 56 years. Erected by public subscription."

=== Statue of John Candlish ===
Roughly in the centre of the park, stands a statue of John Candlish, who was mayor and later Member of Parliament for Sunderland from 1866 to 1874.

The statue is signed and dated "C Bacon Sc London 1875", with the founder's mark "H Young & Co. Art Founders Pimlico". The slightly larger than life size figure shows Candlish in contemporary dress on a square plinth with a moulded stepped base of polished porphyritic granite. The inscription reads: "John Candlish M.P. Born 1815 Died 1874".

=== Walrus ===
Sunderland has strong links with author Lewis Carroll – it is believed Carroll drew upon the sights of Sunderland in his work. To commemorate the link, there is a themed play area and – most notably a walrus sculpture by the lake made by the sculptor Andrew Burton in 1999.

== Gallery ==
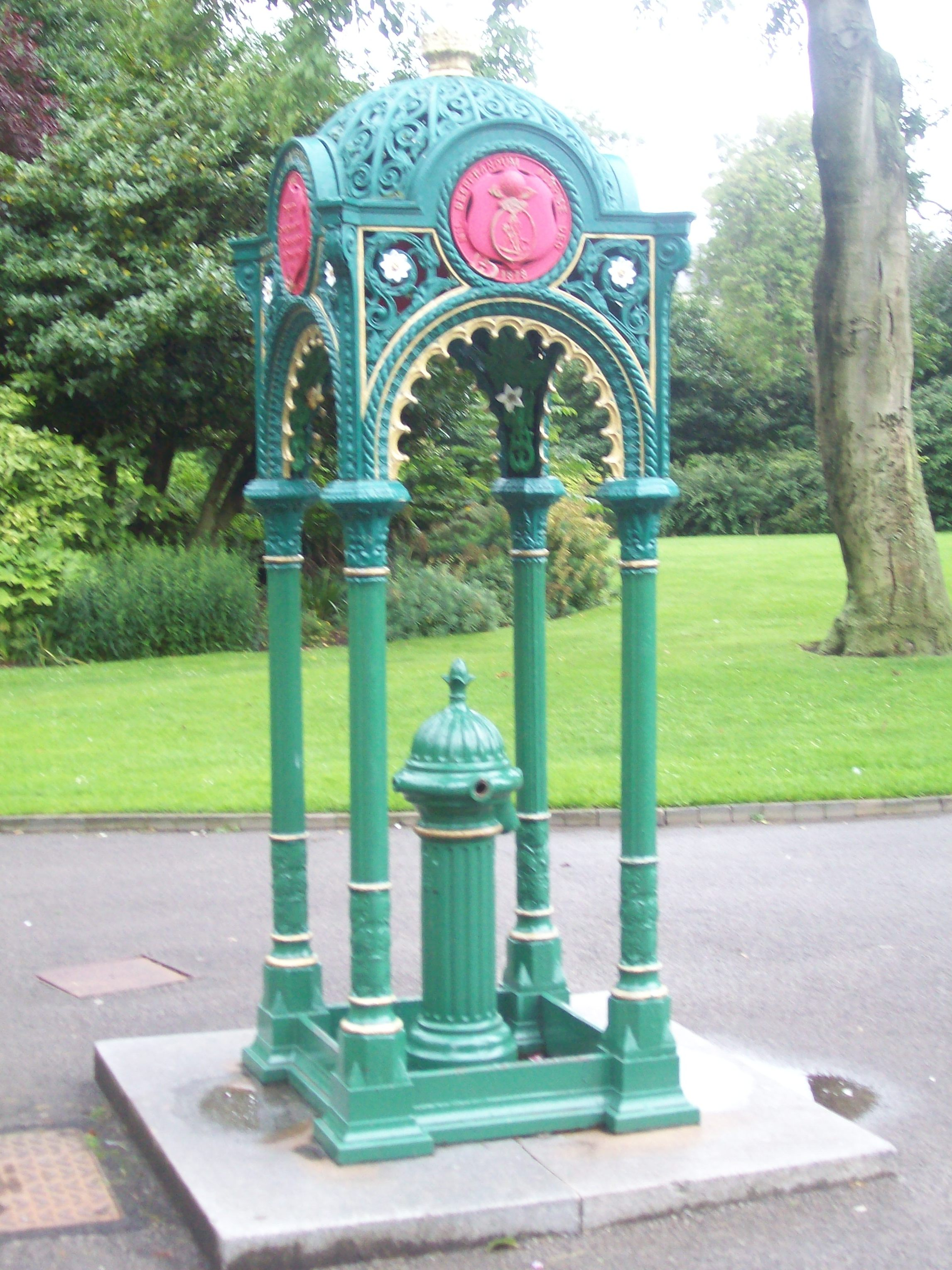
William Hall Drinking Fountain

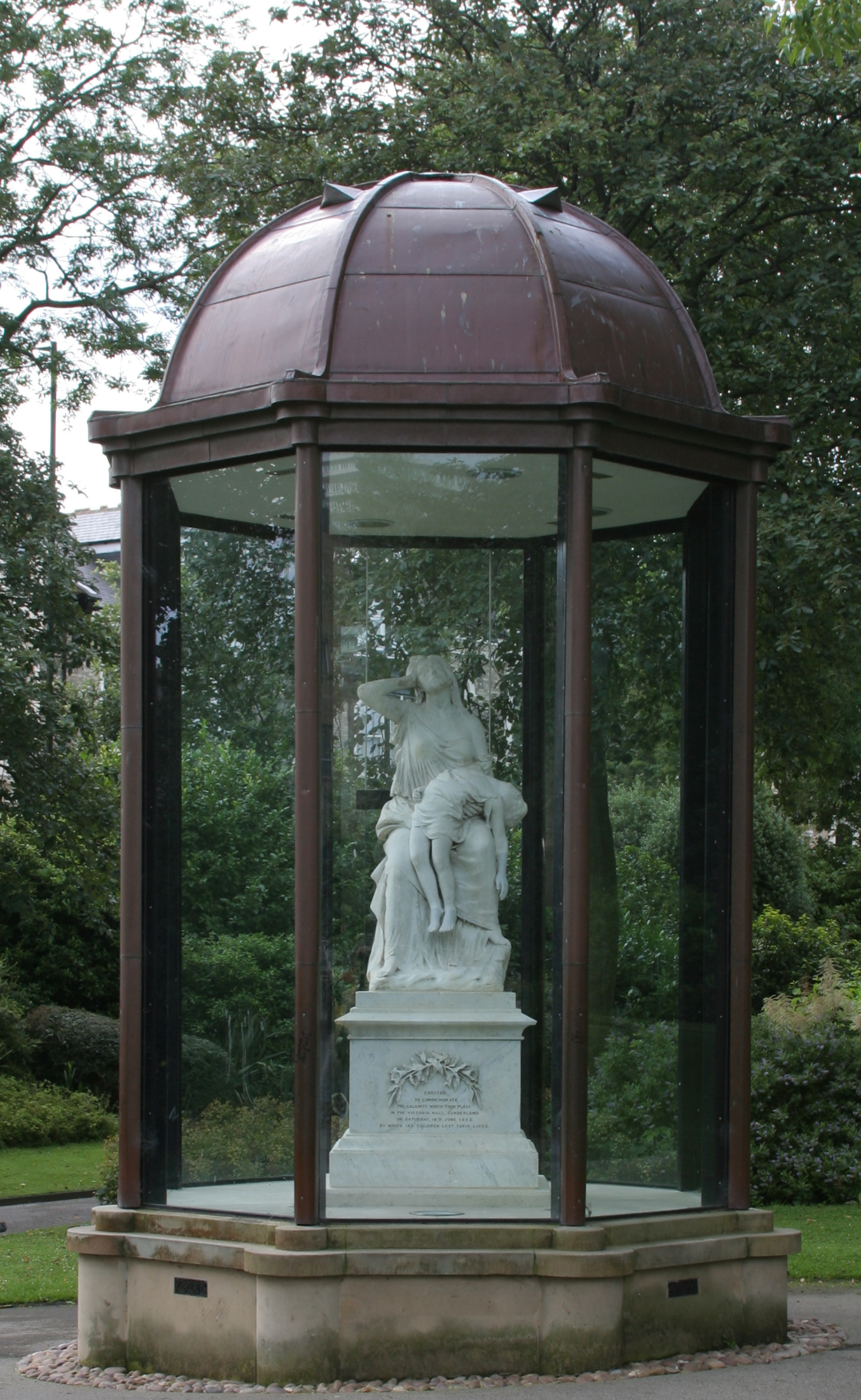
Victoria Hall disaster Memorial

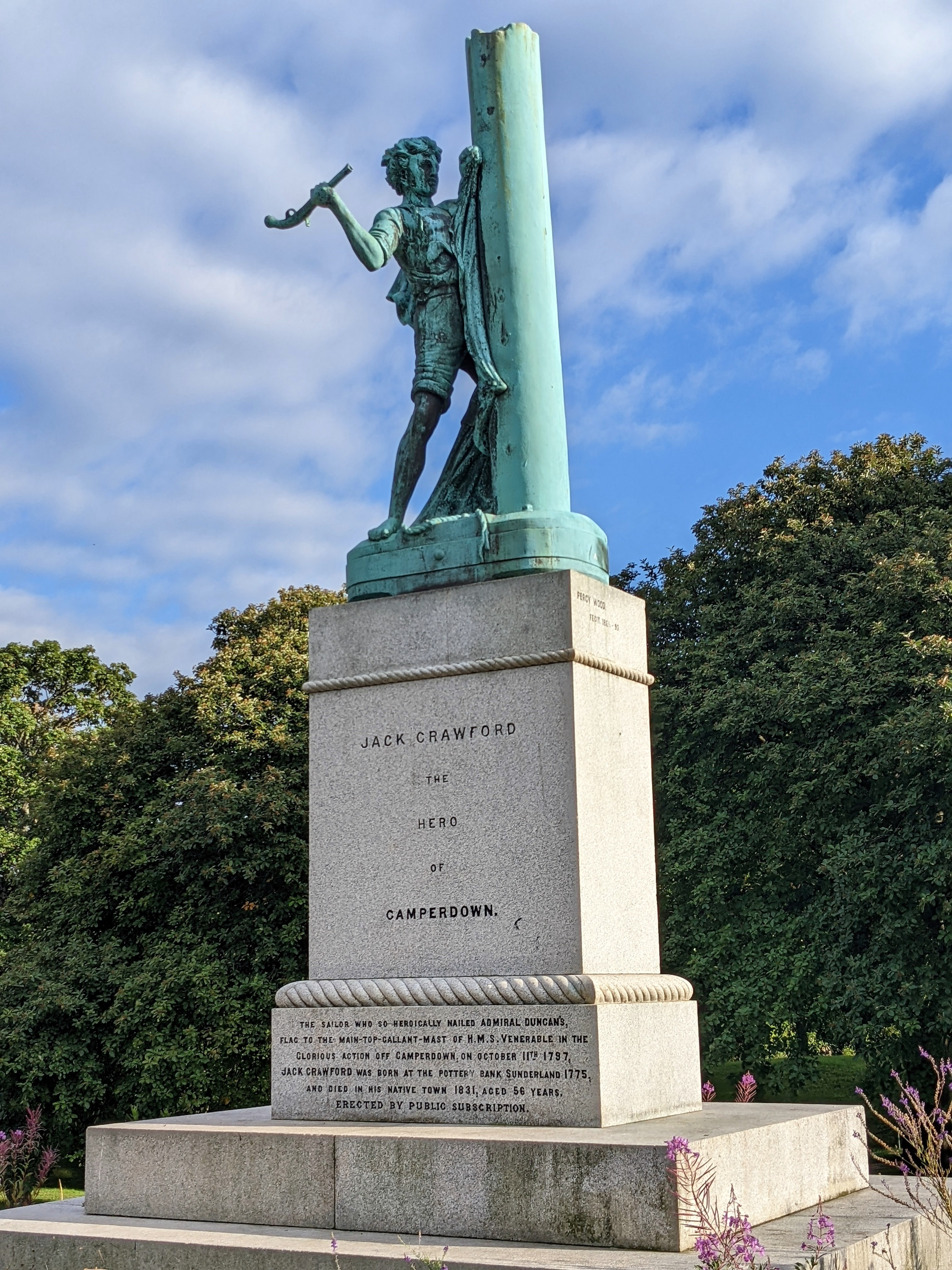
Statue of Jack Crawford

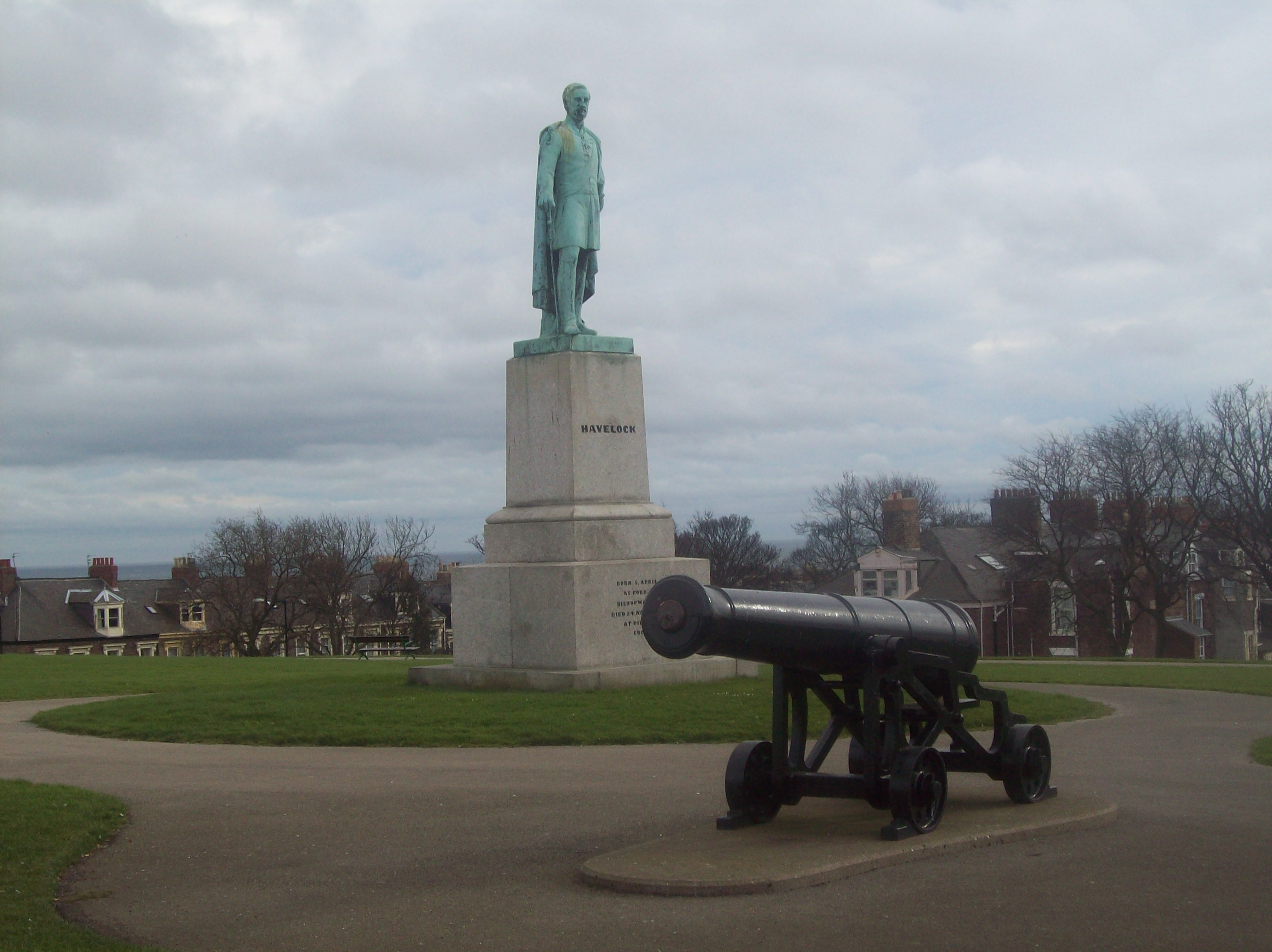
Statue of General Havelock

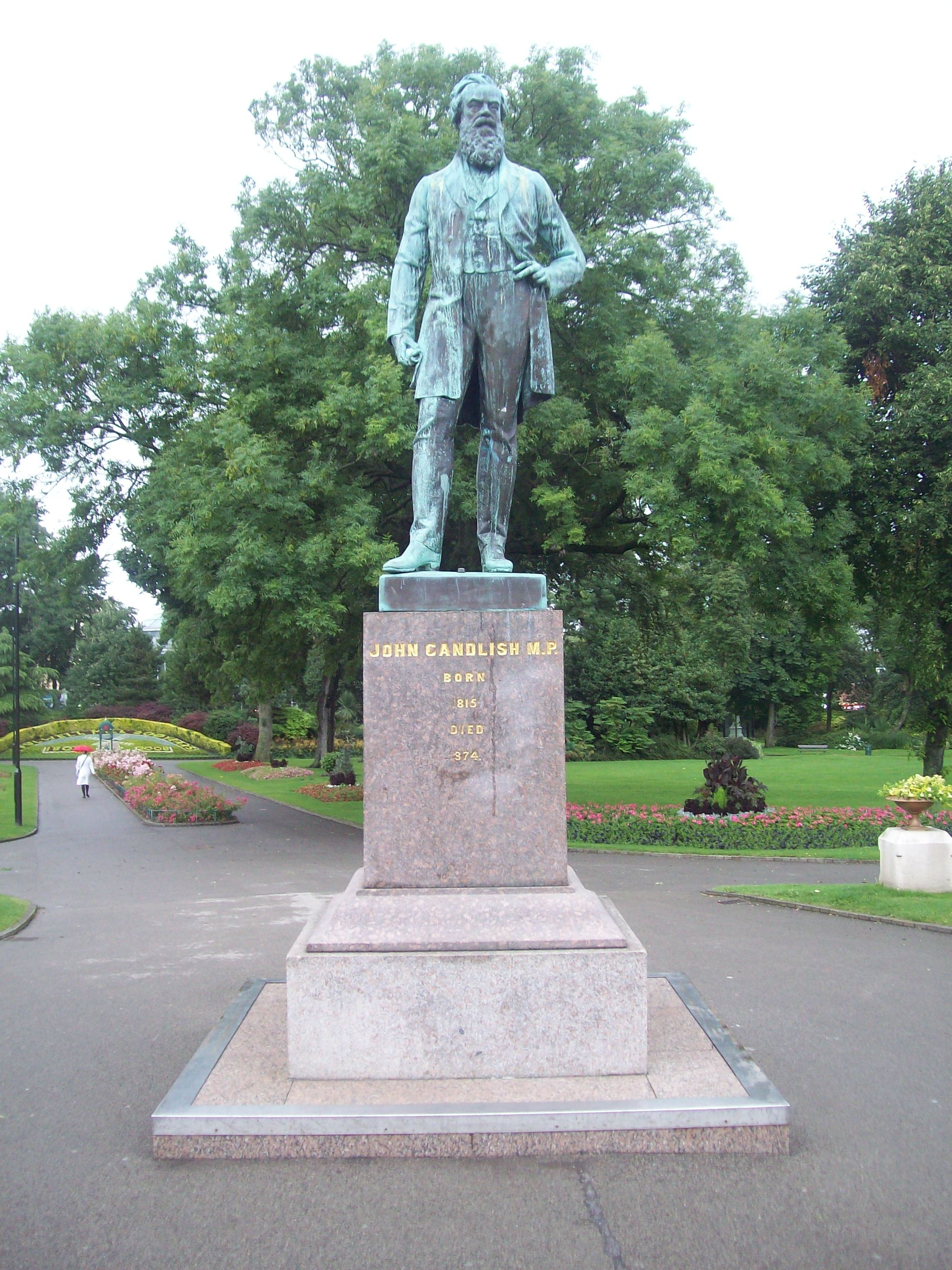
Statue of John Candlish

== Events ==
Mowbray Park has become the focus of annual Christmas celebrations in the city.
