= Victoria Hall disaster =

1883 crowd crush in Sunderland, England

- Poster advertising the variety show at which the children died

- Victoria Hall disaster (Tyne and Wear)
- Date: 16 June 1883
- Time: 3 p.m.
- Location: Victoria Hall, Sunderland, Tyne and Wear, England, UK; 54°54′12.3″N 01°22′44.8″W
- Type: Crowd crush
- Deaths: 183
- Grid reference: NZ398565
- Summary: 183 children, aged between 3 and 14, were crushed to death in a rush to the stage when free toys were offered.

On 16 June 1883, a crowd crush caused by the distribution of free prizes resulted in the deaths of 183 children at the Victoria Hall in Sunderland, England.

== Events ==
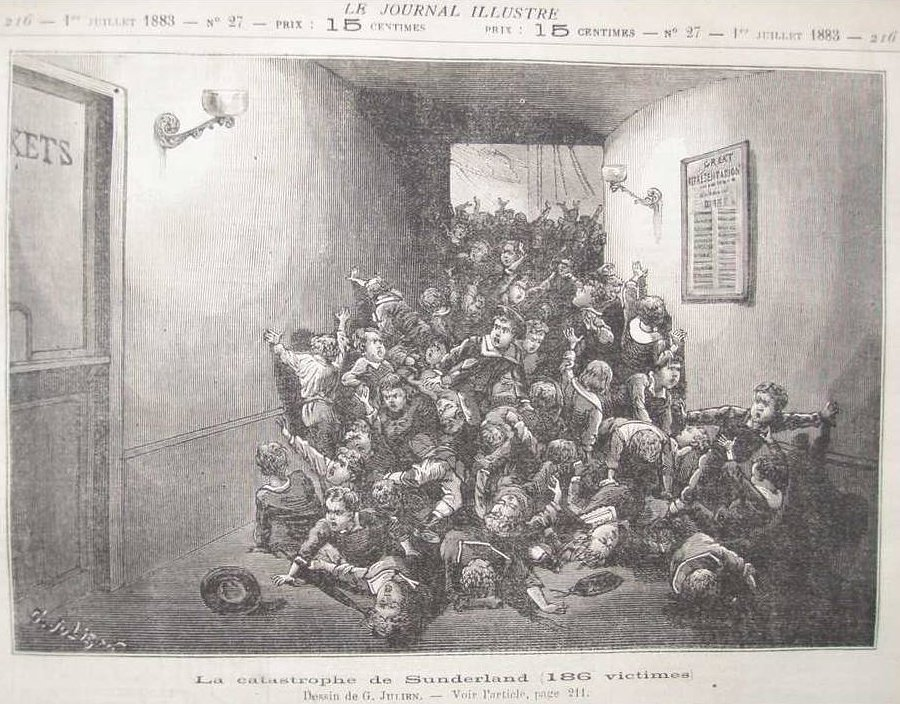
Illustration of the disaster, from Le Journal illustré

On 16 June 1883, a children's variety show was presented by the travelling entertainer Alexander Fay, assisted by his sister Annie. At the show's end, an announcement was made that children with certain numbered tickets would be presented with a prize upon exit. At the same time, entertainers began distributing gifts from the stage to the children in the stalls. Worried about missing out on the treats, many of the estimated 1,100 children in the gallery surged toward the staircase leading downstairs.

At the bottom of the staircase, the door opened inward and had been bolted to leave a gap only wide enough for one child to pass at a time. It is believed this was to ensure the orderly checking of tickets. With few accompanying adults to maintain order, the children surged down the stairs toward the door. Those at the front became trapped and were crushed to death by the weight of the crowd behind them.

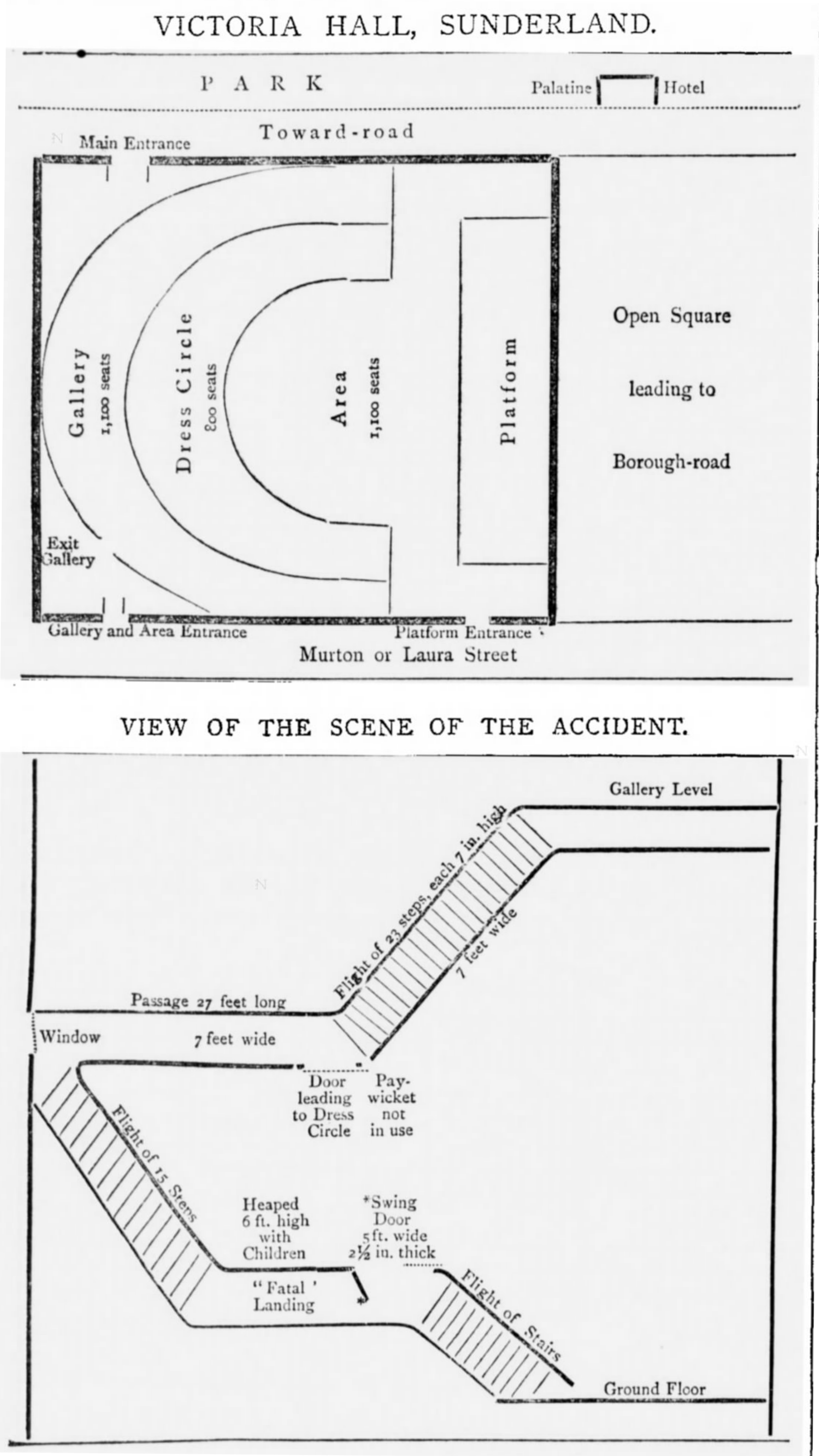
Layout of the theatre at the time of the disaster

When the adults in the auditorium realised what was happening, they rushed to the door but could not open it as the bolt was on the children's side. Caretaker Frederick Graham tried in vain to disentangle the pile-up, then ran up another staircase and diverted approximately 600 children to safety by another exit. Meanwhile, other adults pulled the children one by one through the narrow gap, before one man wrenched the door off its hinges.

In his 1894 account, survivor William Codling, Jr., described the crush and the realisation that people were dying:

Soon we were most uncomfortably packed but still going down. Suddenly I felt that I was treading upon someone lying on the stairs and I cried in horror to those behind "Keep back, keep back! There's someone down." It was no use, I passed slowly over and onwards with the mass and before long I passed over others without emotion.

== Aftermath ==
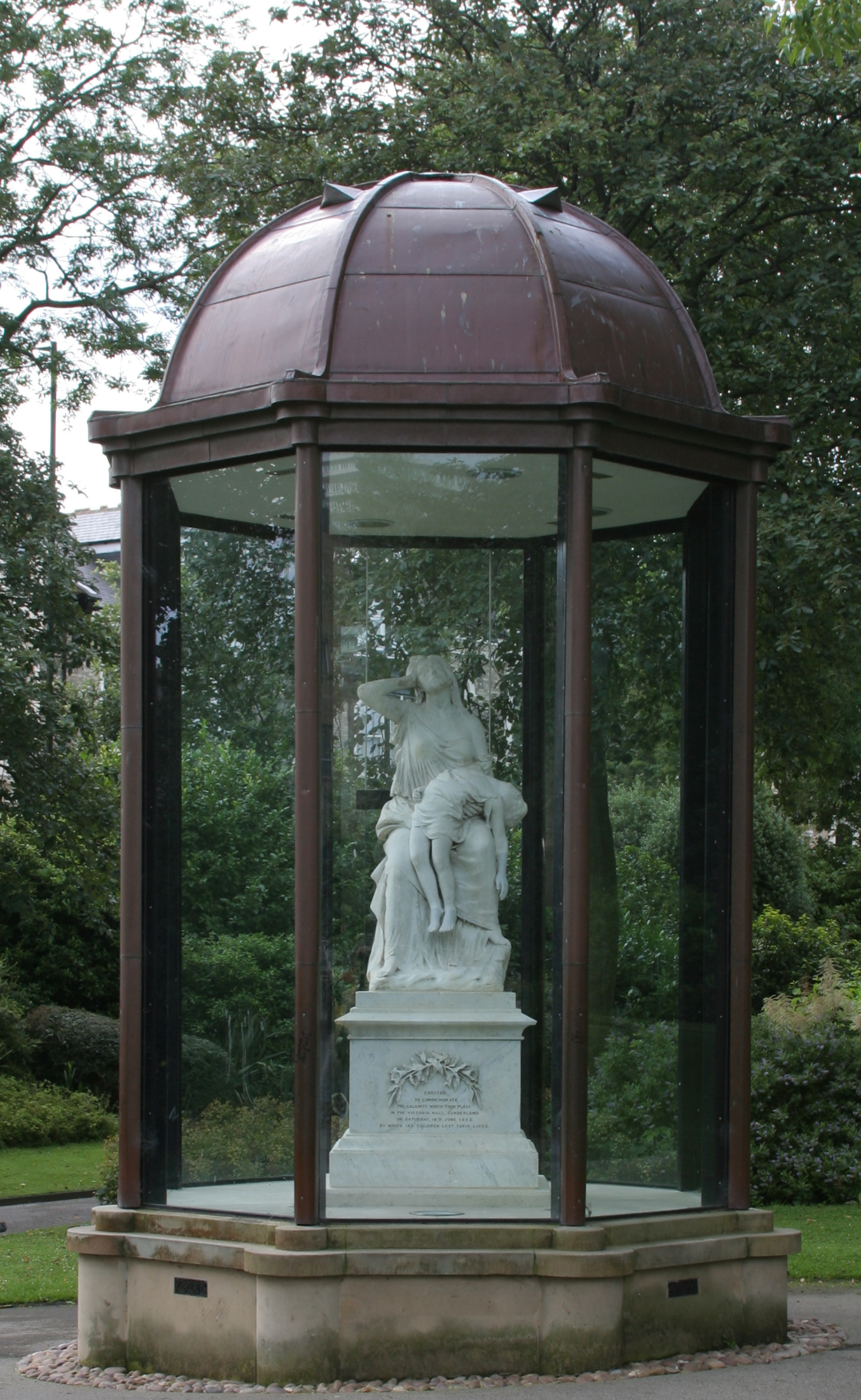
The Victoria Hall Disaster Memorial in Mowbray Park

The compressive asphyxia as a result of the crowd crush killed 183 children between 3 and 14 years of age. Medical findings of these children were described in detail in the British Medical Journal of 23 June 1883.

Queen Victoria sent a message of condolence to the grieving families and contributed to the disaster fund. Donations sent from all over Britain totalled £5,000 (equivalent to £530,000 in 2025) and were used for the children's funerals and a memorial in Mowbray Park. The memorial of a grieving mother holding a dead child was later moved to Bishopwearmouth Cemetery, where it gradually fell into disrepair and was vandalised. In 2002, the marble statue was restored for £63,000 and moved back to Mowbray Park with a protective canopy.

Newspaper reports at the time triggered national outrage. The resulting inquiry led to legislation that public entertainment venues be fitted with a minimum number of outward-opening emergency exits, which led to the invention of "push bar" emergency doors. This law still remains in force. No one was prosecuted for the disaster, and the person responsible for bolting the door was never identified. The Victoria Hall remained in use until 1941, when it was destroyed by a parachute bomb in The Blitz during World War II.

Annual memorial services were set up in 2010 by the Sunderland Old Township Heritage Society.

== Depiction in media ==
The disaster inspired a poem by Scottish poet William McGonagall entitled "The Sunderland Calamity".

== See also ==
- Barnsley Public Hall disaster
- Laurier Palace Theatre fire
- Hillsborough disaster
- PhilSports Stadium stampede, crowd crush on a game show
