= Sunderland Museum and Winter Gardens =

Coordinates: 54°54′15″N 1°22′48″W

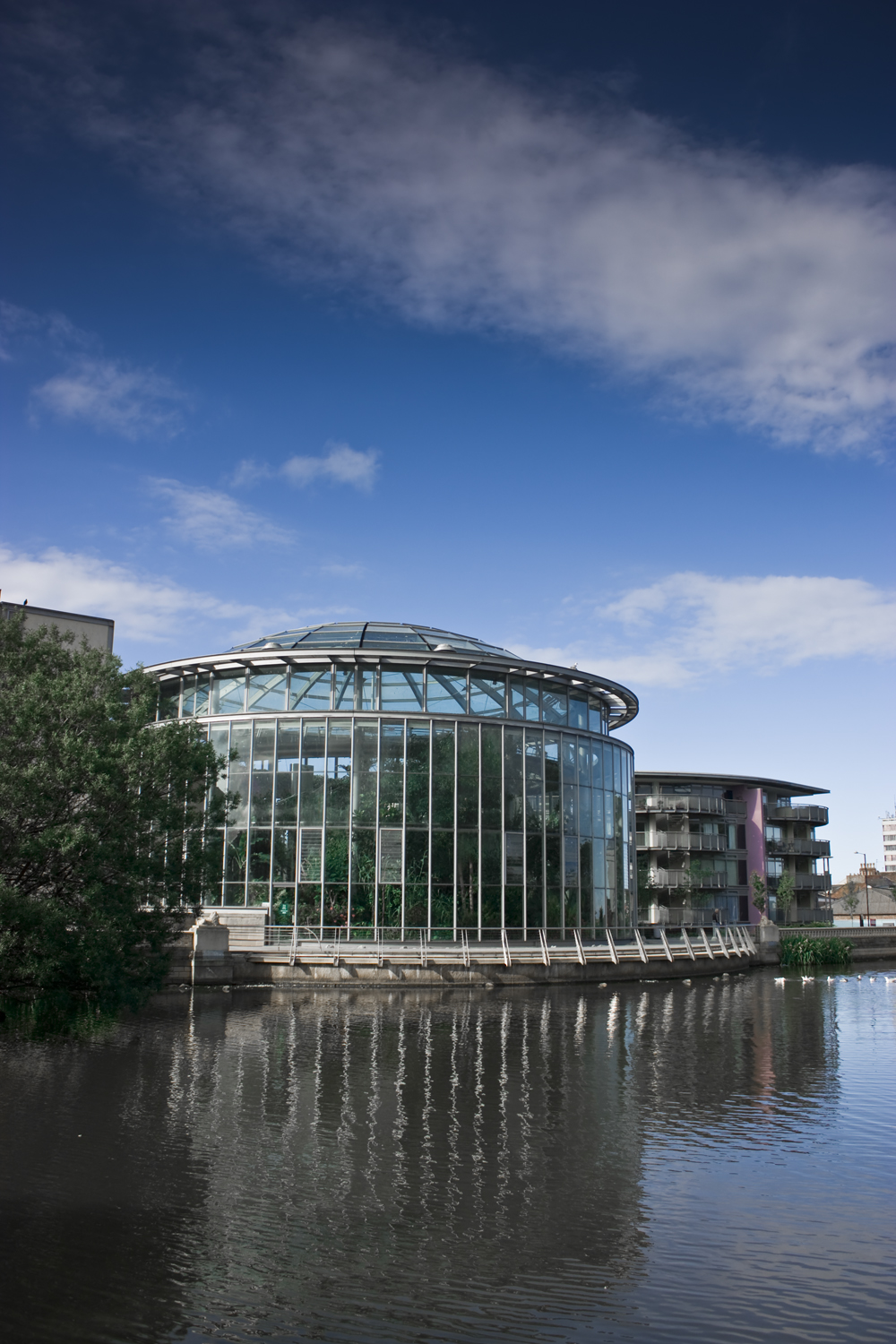
- Sunderland Museum and Winter Gardens from Mowbray Park
- Established: 1846
- Location: Burdon Road, Sunderland, England
- Type: Museum
- Website: www.sunderlandmuseum.org.uk

Sunderland Museum and Winter Gardens is a municipal museum in Sunderland, in Tyne and Wear, England. It contains the only known British example of a gliding reptile, the oldest known vertebrate capable of gliding flight. The exhibit was discovered in Eppleton quarry. The museum has a Designated Collection of national importance.

== History ==
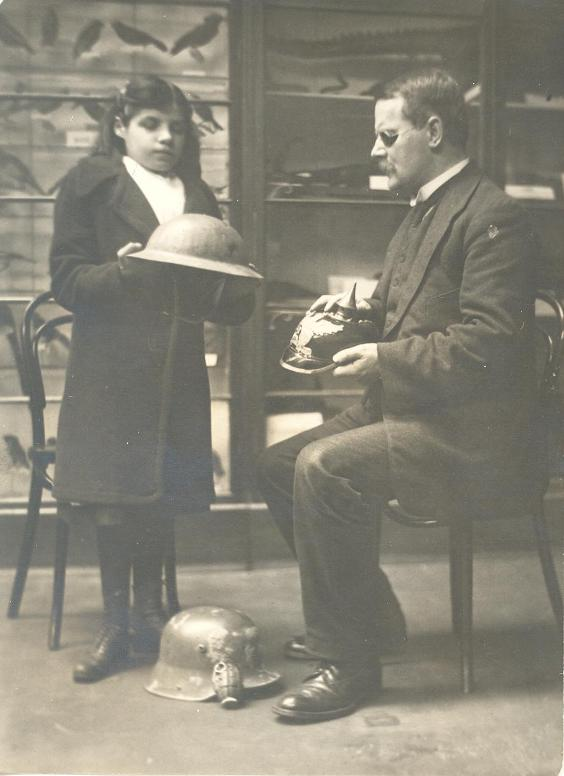
My Daddy Wears one of These, a teacher (himself blind) at Sunderland Council Blind School teaches a blind child the shape of First World War helmets through handling them. Beginning in 1913, John Alfred Charlton Deas, a former curator at Sunderland Museum, organised several handling sessions for the blind. This included an invitation to the school to handle some of the museum collection, which was 'eagerly accepted'.

It was established in 1846, in the Athenaeum Building on Fawcett Street, the first municipally funded museum in the country outside London. The first recorded fine art acquisition was commissioned by the Sunderland Corporation, a painting of the opening of the new South Dock in 1850. This may have been the first time that an artwork was commissioned by a town council.

In 1879, the Museum moved to a new larger building next to Mowbray Park including a library and winter garden based on the model of the Crystal Palace. U.S. President Ulysses Grant was in attendance at the laying of the foundation stone by Alderman Samuel Storey in 1877. The building opened in 1879.

During World War II, Winter Garden was damaged by a parachute mine in 1941 and demolished the following year. A 1960s extension took its place, but in 2001, a lottery funded refurbishment of the museum created a new Winter Garden extension and improved facilities.

The Winter Gardens contain over 2,000 flowers and plants.

In 2003, the Museum was recognised as the most attended outside London.

The Museum contains a large collection of the locally made Sunderland Lustreware pottery. Other highlights of the Museum are a stuffed Lion which was acquired in 1879, the remains of a walrus brought back from Siberia in the 1880s and the first Nissan car to be made in Sunderland. Also featured are the skeletal remains of a male human being and a dinosaur bone which was found in the local area.

The library moved in 1995 to the new City Library and Arts Centre on Fawcett Street (occupying part of the former Binns Department Store). The relocation left more space for museum exhibitions. The new City Library Arts Centre also houses the Northern Gallery for Contemporary Art, renowned as one of the leading forums for emerging artists in the North of England.

John Morrison wrote an affectionate memoir of the two and a half years he spent working in the museum as a junior curator, starting about 1918, which appeared in the Australian literary journal Overland in 1968.

L.S. Lowry described his discovery of Sunderland in 1960, after which it became his second home: "One day I was travelling south from Tyneside and I realised this was what I had always been looking for."

Sunderland Museum, with six works and 30 on long-term loan, have a Lowry collection surpassed only by Salford and Manchester.
