= City of Sunderland =

- City and metropolitan borough
- Sunderland
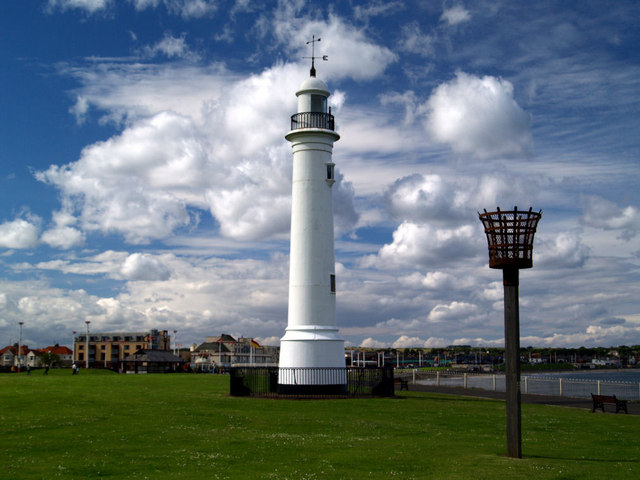
- Sunderland White Lighthouse

- Coat of arms
- Motto(s): Latin: Nil Desperandum Auspice Deo, lit. 'do not despair, have faith in God'
- Sunderland shown within Tyne and Wear
- Coordinates: 54.910°N 1.385°W
- Sovereign state: United Kingdom
- Country: England
- Region: North East
- Ceremonial county: Tyne and Wear
- City region: North East
- Metropolitan borough: 1 April 1974
- City status: 20 May 1992
- Named for: Sunderland
- Administrative HQ: City Hall, Sunderland

Government
  - Type: Metropolitan borough
  - Body: Sunderland City Council
  - Executive: Leader and cabinet
  - Control: Reform UK
  - Leader: Michael Mordey (L)
  - Mayor: Allison Chisnall
  - MPs: 3 MPs: Lewis Atkinson (L); Sharon Hodgson (L); Bridget Phillipson (L)

Area
  - Total: 137 km^{2} (53 sq mi)
  - Rank: 172nd

Population (2025)
  - Total: 287,070
  - Rank: 59th
  - Density: 2,089/km^{2} (5,410/sq mi)
- Demonym: Mackem (colloq.)

Ethnicity (2021)
  - Ethnic groups: List: 94.6% White; 3.0% Asian; 1.0% Black; 0.9% Mixed; 0.5% other

Religion (2021)
  - Religion: List: 53.2% Christianity; 39.5% no religion; 1.8% Islam; 0.3% Sikhism; 0.2% Hinduism; 0.2% Buddhism; 0.0% Judaism; 0.3% other; 4.5% not stated
- Time zone: UTC+0 (GMT)
  - Summer (DST): UTC+1 (BST)
- Postcode area: SR; NE; DH
- Dialling code: 0191
- ISO 3166 code: GB-SND
- GSS code: E08000024
- Website: sunderland.gov.uk

City of Sunderland (/ˈsʌndərlənd/), is a metropolitan borough with city status in the metropolitan county of Tyne and Wear, England. It is named after Sunderland, and includes the towns of Hetton-le-Hole, Houghton-le-Spring and Washington. It also covers various surrounding villages and hamlets. The district also forms part of Wearside which includes Birtley in the Metropolitan Borough of Gateshead and Chester-le-Street in County Durham.

The district was formed in 1974 as part of the provisions of the Local Government Act 1972 and is an amalgamation of four former local government districts of County Durham. It was granted city status in 1992, the Ruby Jubilee of Queen Elizabeth II's accession to the throne. The borough had a population of 275,506 at the time of the 2011 census, with the majority of the population (174,286) residing in Sunderland.
