= Sunderland lustreware =

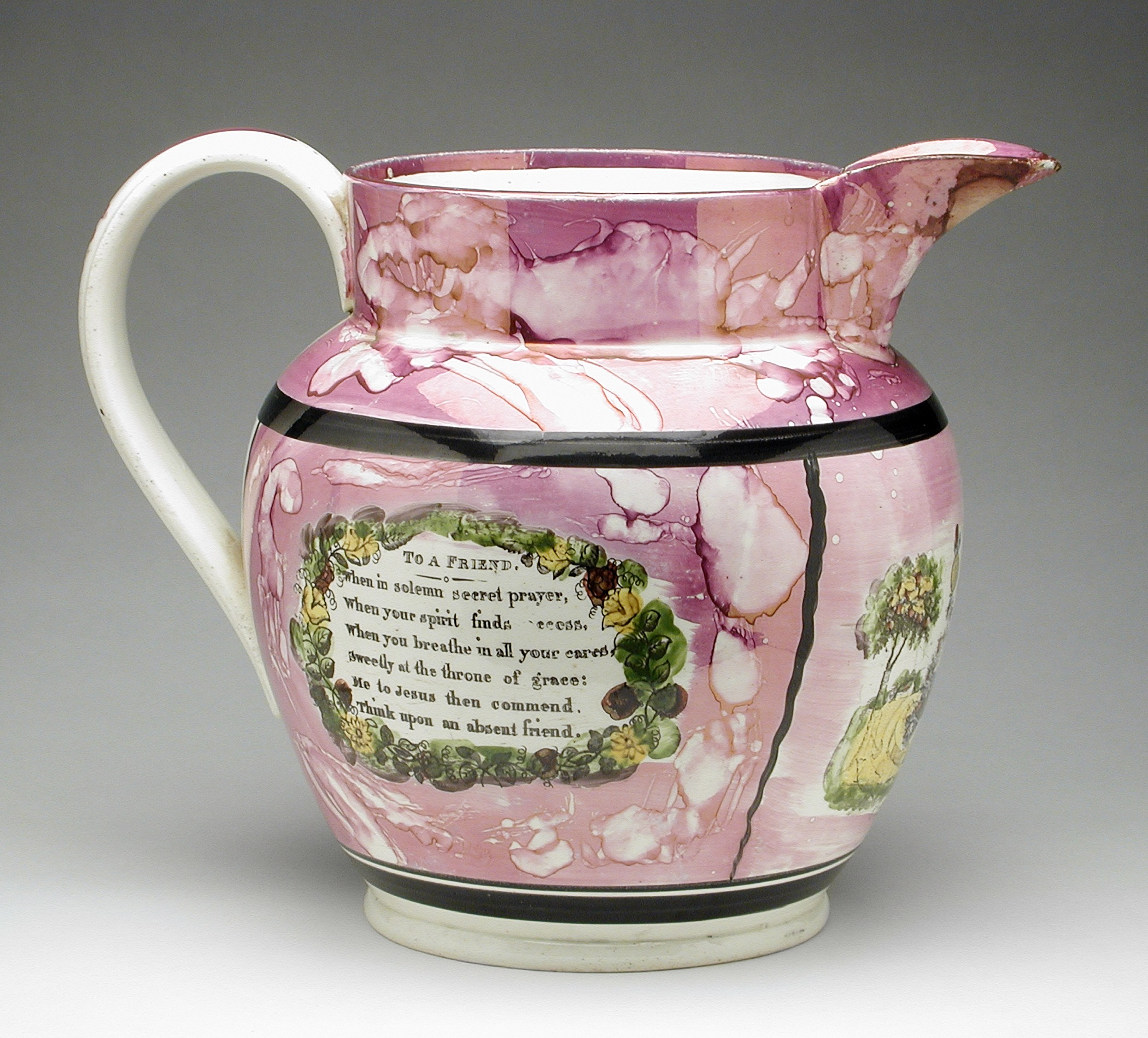
Jug, c. 1820, with pink "splash lustre".

Sunderland lustreware is a type of lustreware pottery made, mostly in the early 19th century, in several potteries around Sunderland, England.

According to Michael Gibson there were 16 potteries in Sunderland of which 7 are known to have produced lustrewares (alongside conventional wares of various types) in the nineteenth century. Many are not marked, and are hard or impossible to distinguish from similar wares made in Staffordshire pottery, as well as Newcastle upon Tyne and North Shields, so to some extent Sunderland has become a term for the style, rather than a specific indication of origin.

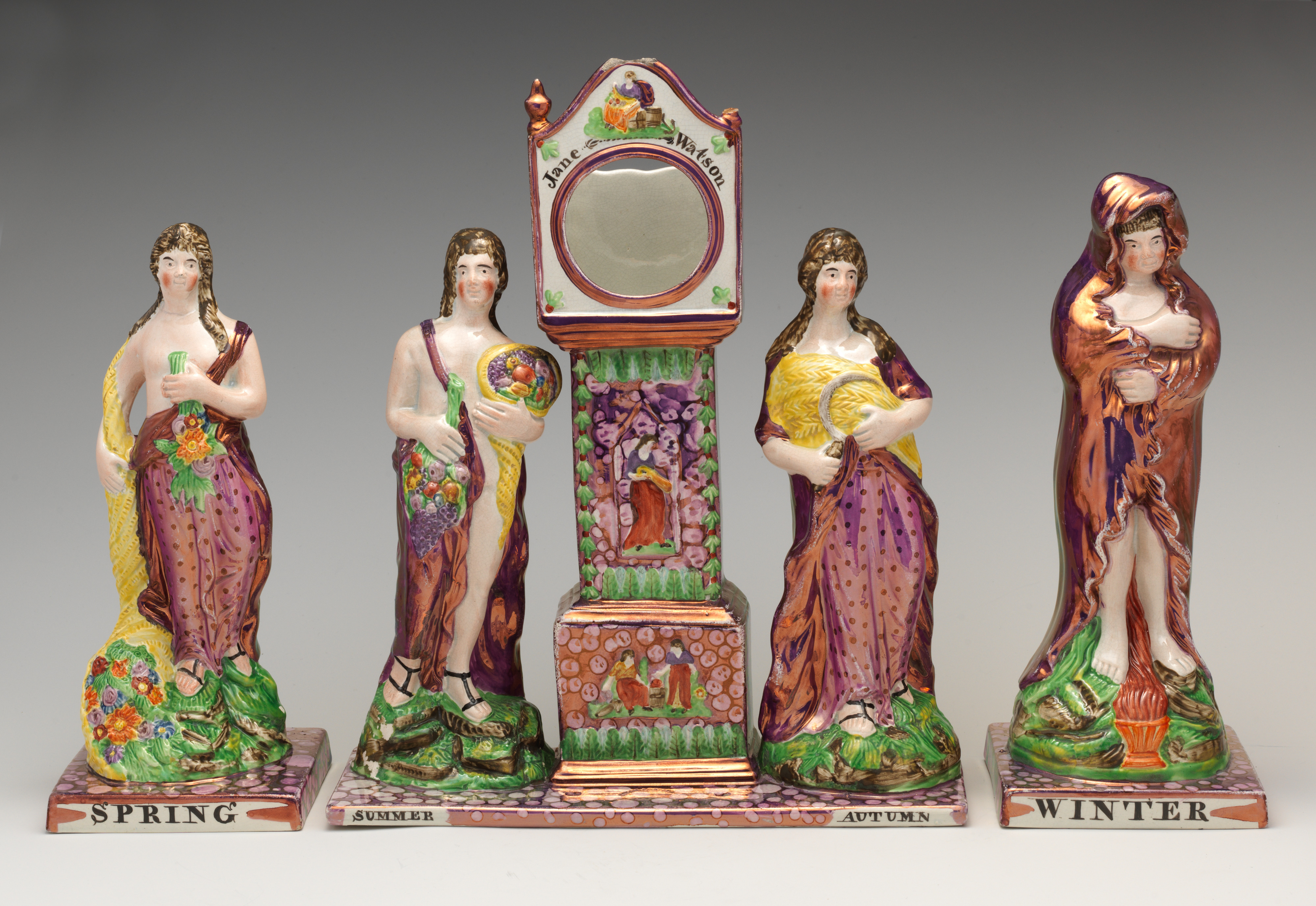
Clock chimneypiece of three pieces, with figures of the four seasons, Dixon Austin and Co., 1820-26. Max height 12 inches.

Lustreware was not made in England before the start of the 19th century, and was initially developed in Staffordshire, where Wedgwood developed a pink or gold lustre finish about 1805, which they sold as "Moonlight". The Sunderland factories mostly made fairly cheap and popular pieces, many of them plaques, especially rectangular ones with "picture frame" edges, and an image of inscription in the central panel; these are usually in the characteristic pink colour. These might be a transfer-printed image of a ship, celebrity, or building, or a painted personal inscription (known as presentation pieces). Many used the "splash lustre" effect, achieved by dropping drops of oil onto the lustred piece before firing.

This pottery is now very collectible. It is normally found in a pink form, but orange and other colours are also found. Typical pieces are plaques with moral or religious images and texts, and jugs featuring a design incorporating the bridge over the River Wear, or various heraldic - especially Masonic - devices. The Wearmouth Bridge re-opened after a major reconstruction in 1859. Most of the pieces available today were produced in Anthony Scott's Pottery in Southwick, Dawson's Pottery in Low Ford (now South Hylton), or at Dixon, Austin & Co.

A comprehensive collection is on display in the Sunderland Museum and Winter Gardens.

== Gallery ==
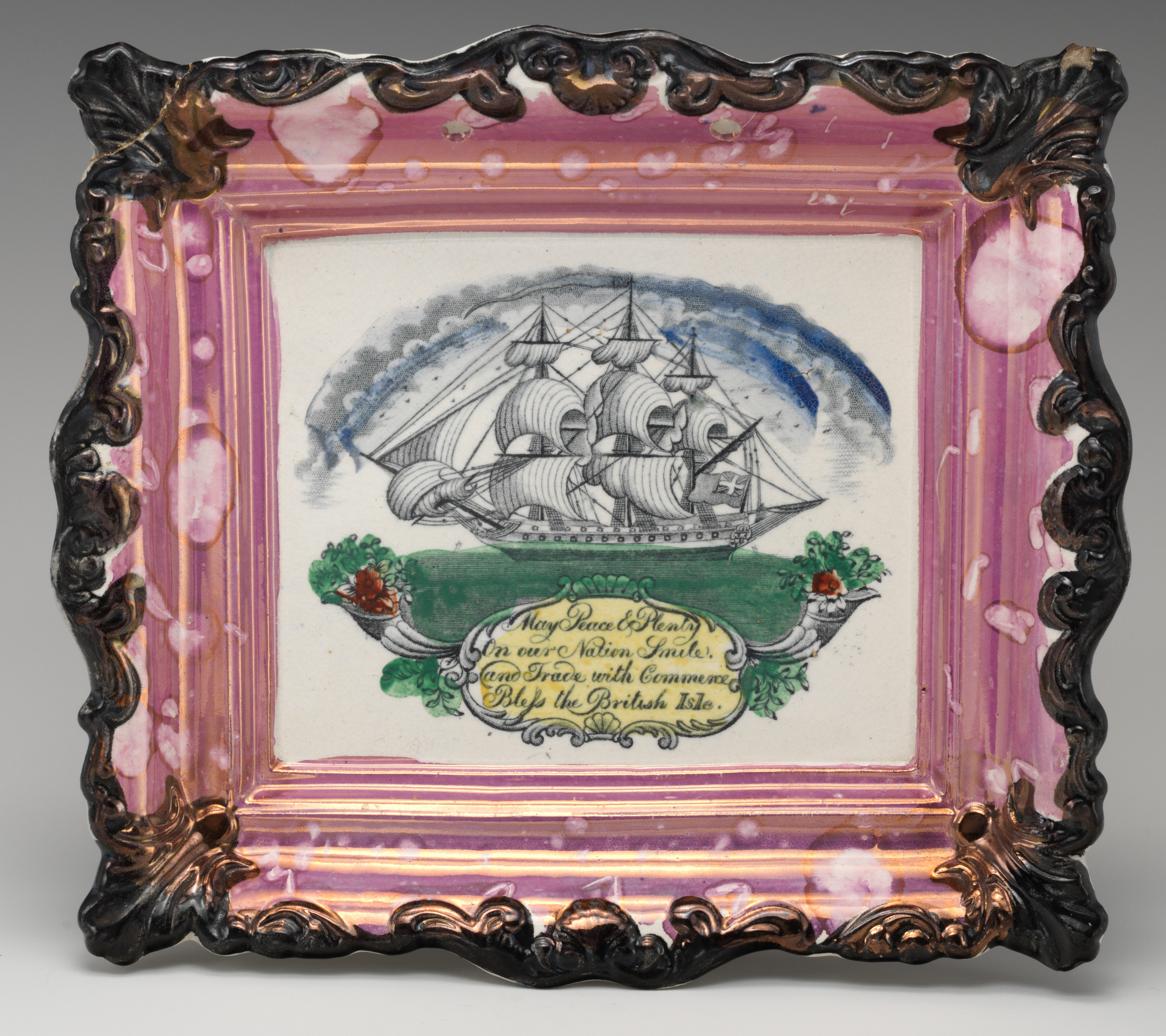
Transfer-printed ship, with inscription ""May Peace & Plenty / On our Nation Smile / and trade with Commerce / Bless the British Isle"

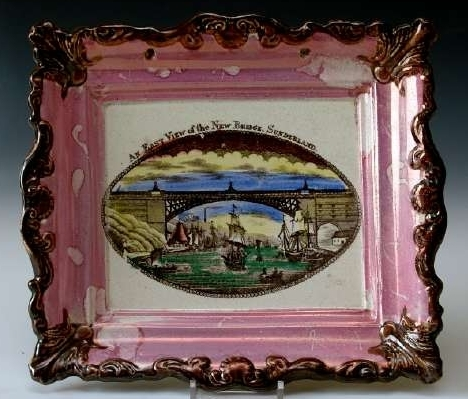
Plaque with the Wearmouth Bridge.

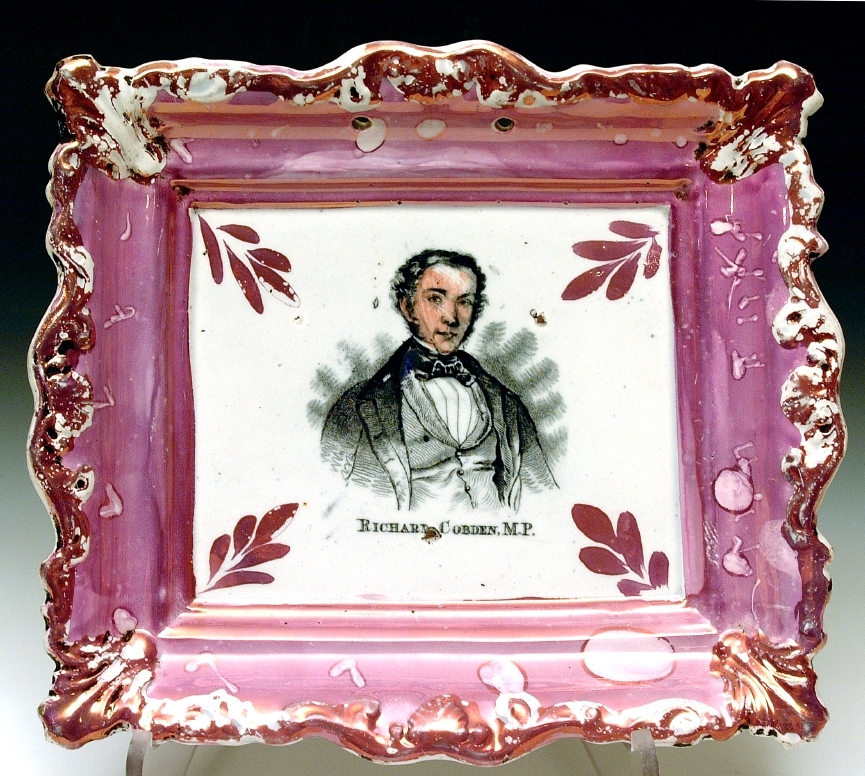
Splash plaque with Richard Cobden MP, leading Radical

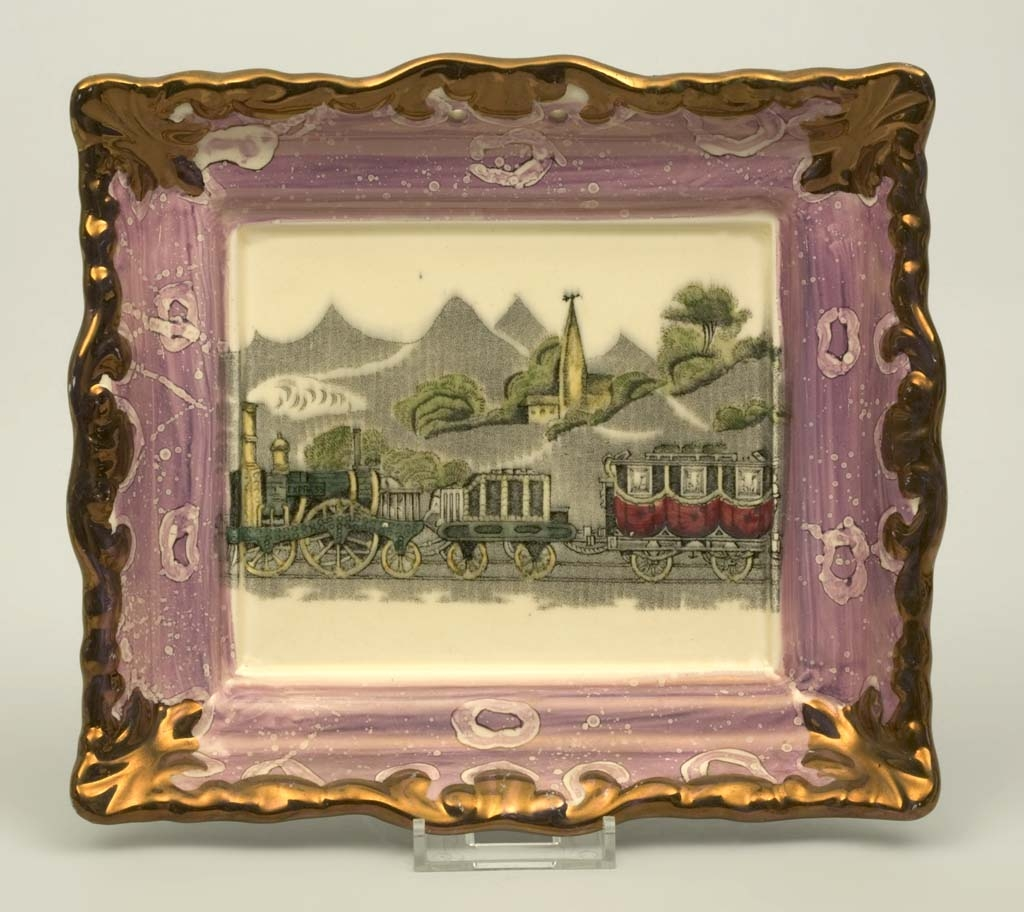
Splash plaque with a railway

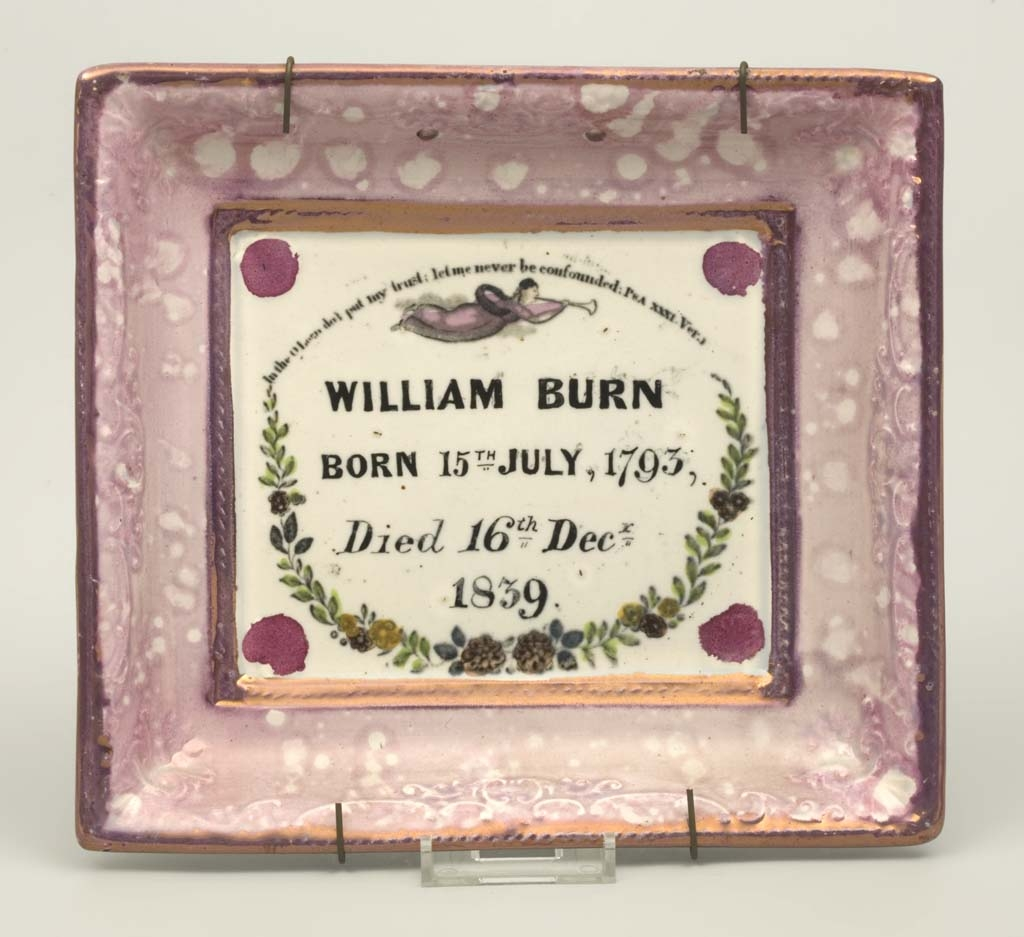
Memorial plaque, presumably 1839

Sunderland lustreware plaque

Sunderland lustreware jug for the "Mariner's Arms" pub.
