= Barnsley Public Hall disaster =

1908 overcrowding disaster in Barnsley, England

Coordinates: 53.554°N 1.479°W

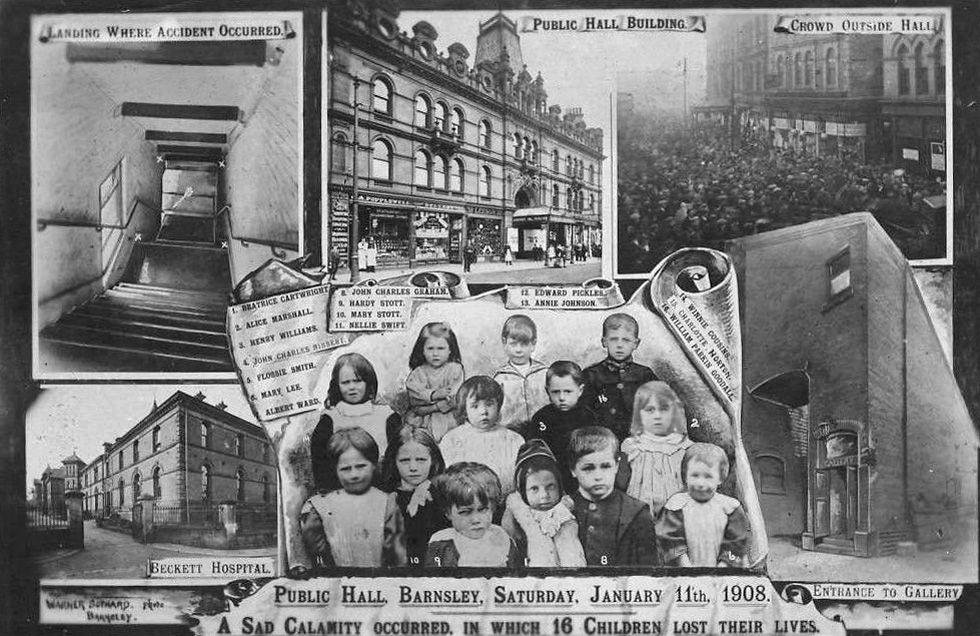
1908 postcard detailing the victims of the disaster

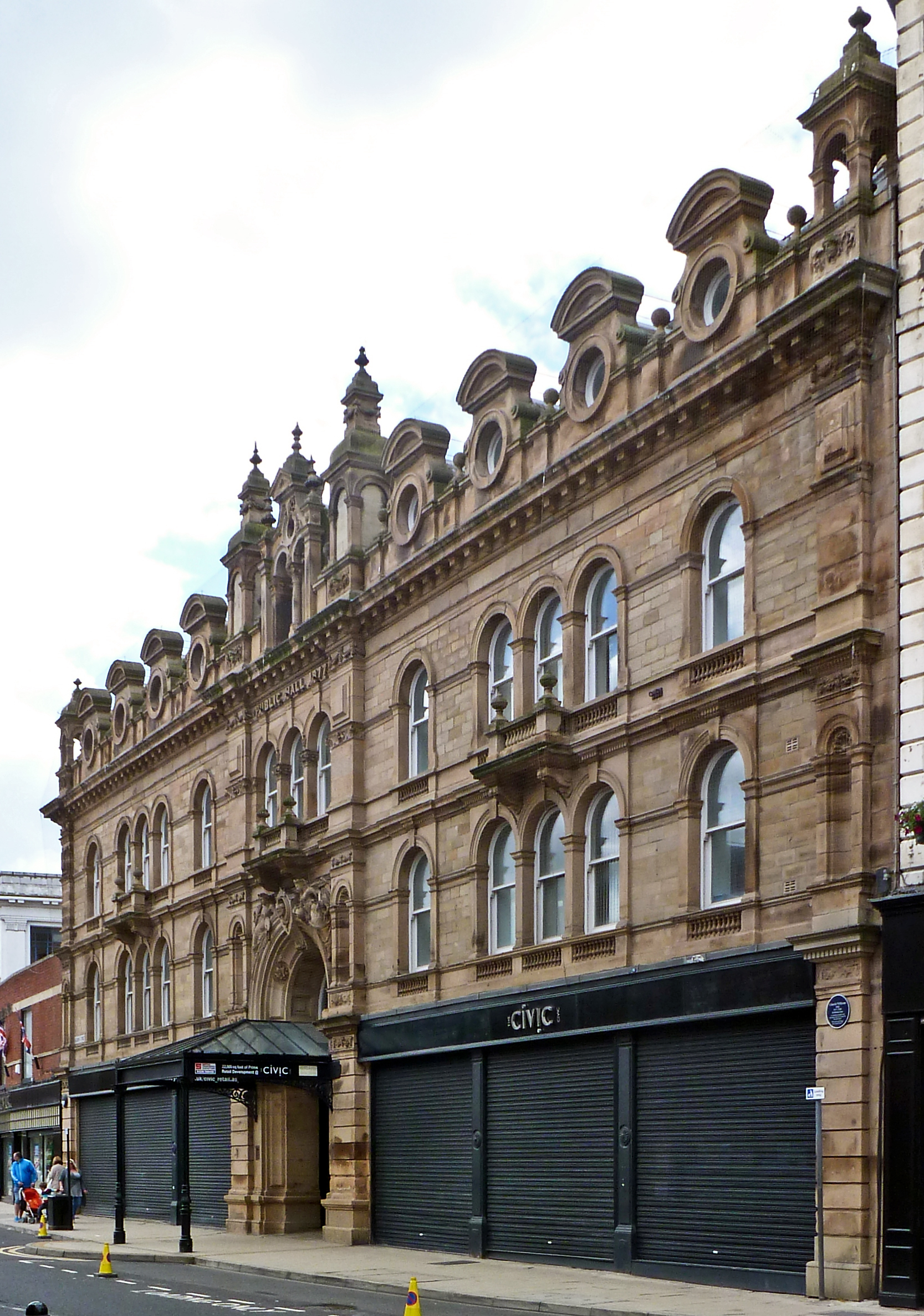
Former Public Hall, now Barnsley Civic Hall

The Barnsley Public Hall disaster took place on Saturday 11 January 1908 in a public hall in Barnsley, West Riding of Yorkshire, England. It resulted in the deaths of sixteen children. At least 40 others were seriously injured. A number of children were entering the hall to see a show when a staircase became overcrowded, and there was a crush as they tried to get inside. The survivors were taken to Beckett Hospital.

== Incident ==
The accident occurred during a penny performance for children at a public hall in Barnsley, West Riding of Yorkshire, on 11 January 1908. Children from across Barnsley had come to watch a film, walking to the public hall through falling snow. According to news reports at the time, a large number of children showed up, and the hall quickly became overcrowded. With the ground floor seats full, children packed into the gallery to such an extent that the aisles of the gallery were filled and children were pressed against the lower gallery railing. In order to relieve some of the crowding, and concerned about the press of bodies against the gallery railing, an attendant in the hall called for some of the children to descend the stairs to the main floor.

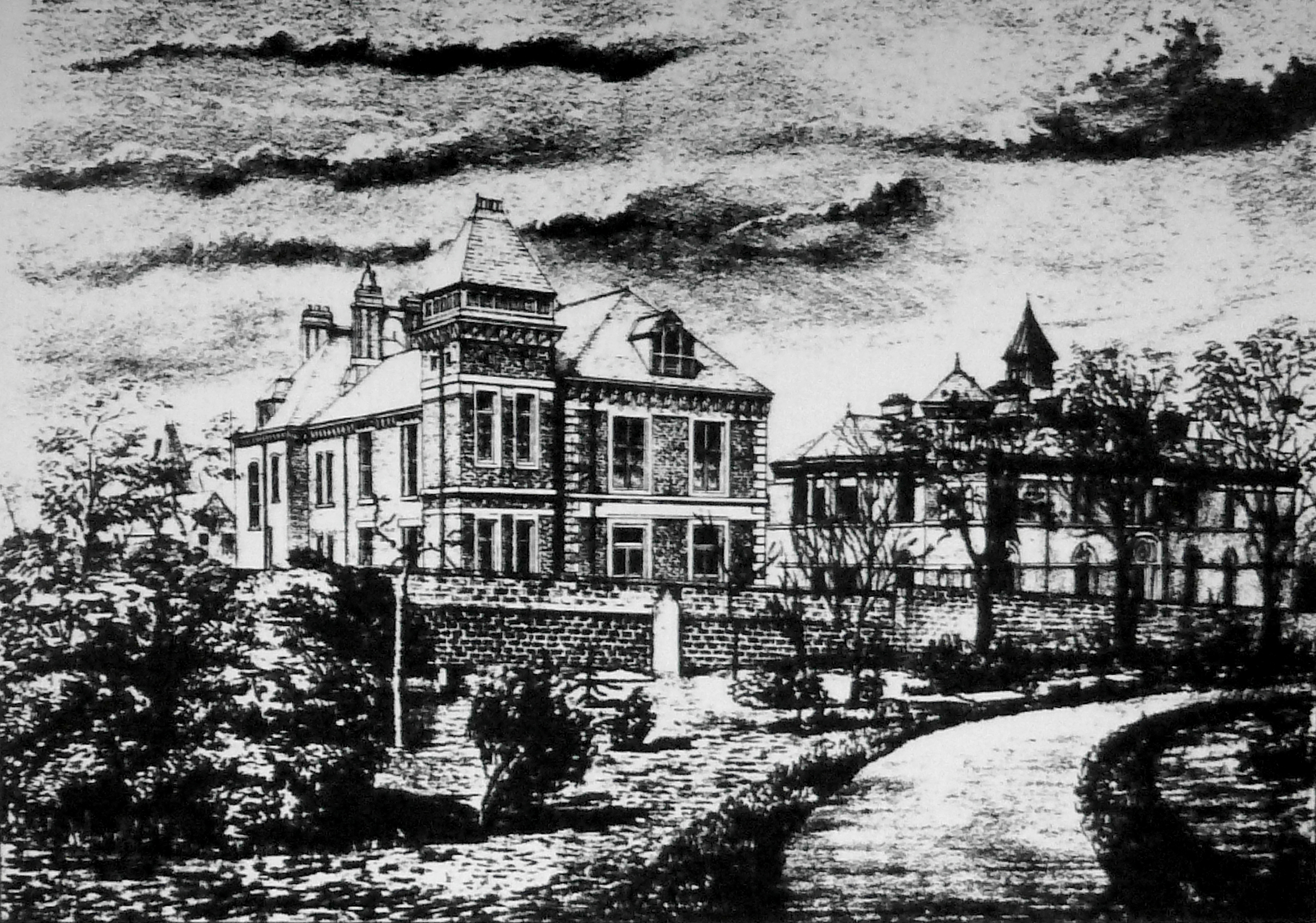
Beckett Hospital, where the injured survivors were treated

This precipitated a mass rush for the stairs as children pushed to gain access to the ground level. As the crowd surged down the narrow staircase, a number of children fell and were trampled or were crushed by other children. Other children, under pressure from the crowd behind them, had to climb or walk over the fallen children to escape danger. Even children who had not originally joined the stampede became panicked because of the screams of those on the stairs. Theatre attendants and police who were quickly called managed to keep the children on the main floor safe and evacuate them. They then worked to extricate those children who had been injured.

According to a wire news report at the time, "When the reserve police arrived they found the narrow stairway practically blocked with bodies." Many of the victims had broken bones or lacerations as a result of being trampled.

== Victims ==
Of the children in the hall, 16 died and more than 40 were injured. Following the accident, women from across the area rushed to the scene of the disaster trying to find their children. The bodies of the dead were later identified by family members at a local mortuary. Wire services carried news of the disaster far and wide, and newspapers as far away as New York City covered the story, sometimes in a sensational manner and with graphic detail about the injuries of the victims.

== Commemoration ==
The disaster was commemorated on its 100th anniversary, 11 January 2008, with a civic ceremony. During the ceremony, a plaque was unveiled inside the building, now called the Civic, which listed the names of the sixteen victims of the tragedy, all of whom were under the age of ten at the time of their deaths. Among the attendees was a younger sister of two of the victims, now elderly. The town archives have in their research collection memorabilia of the event, including condolence cards and other materials donated by relatives of the victims.

== See also ==
- Victoria Hall disaster
- Italian Hall disaster
- Royal Surrey Gardens
- Shouting fire in a crowded theatre
