= Battle ensign =

Large war ensign hoisted on a warship

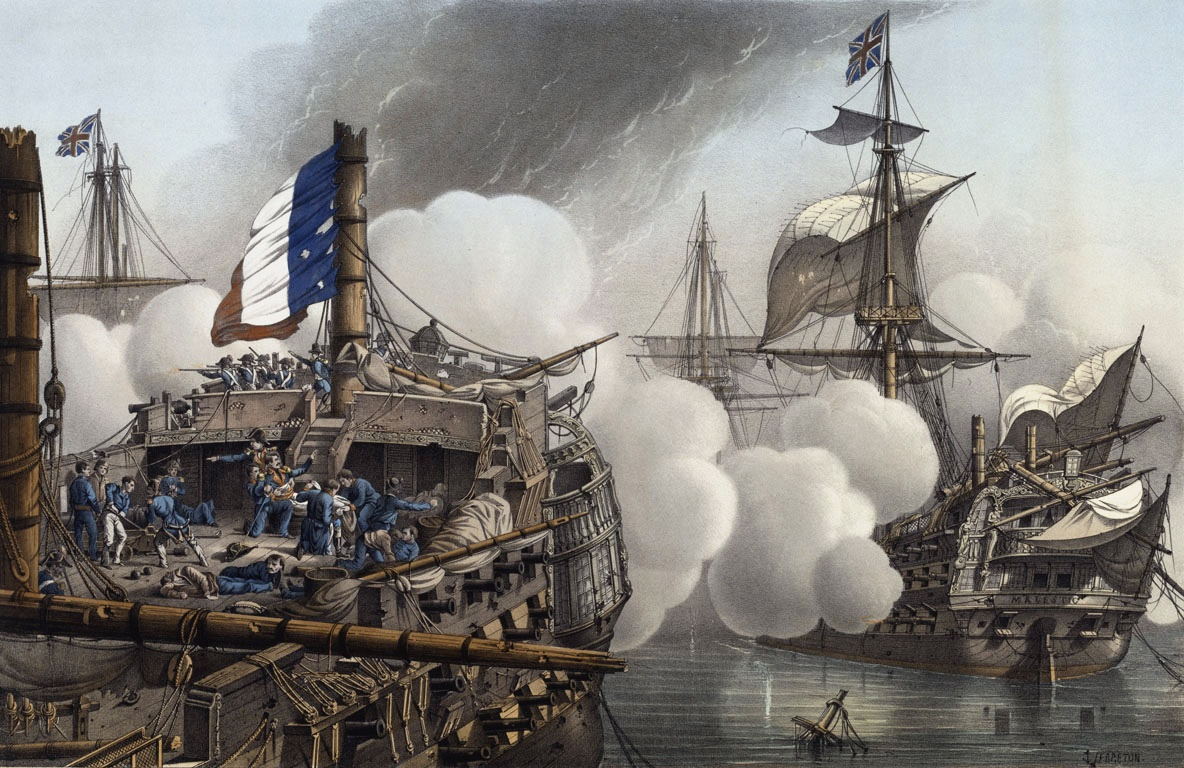
The Tonnant at the Battle of the Nile, by Louis Lebreton.

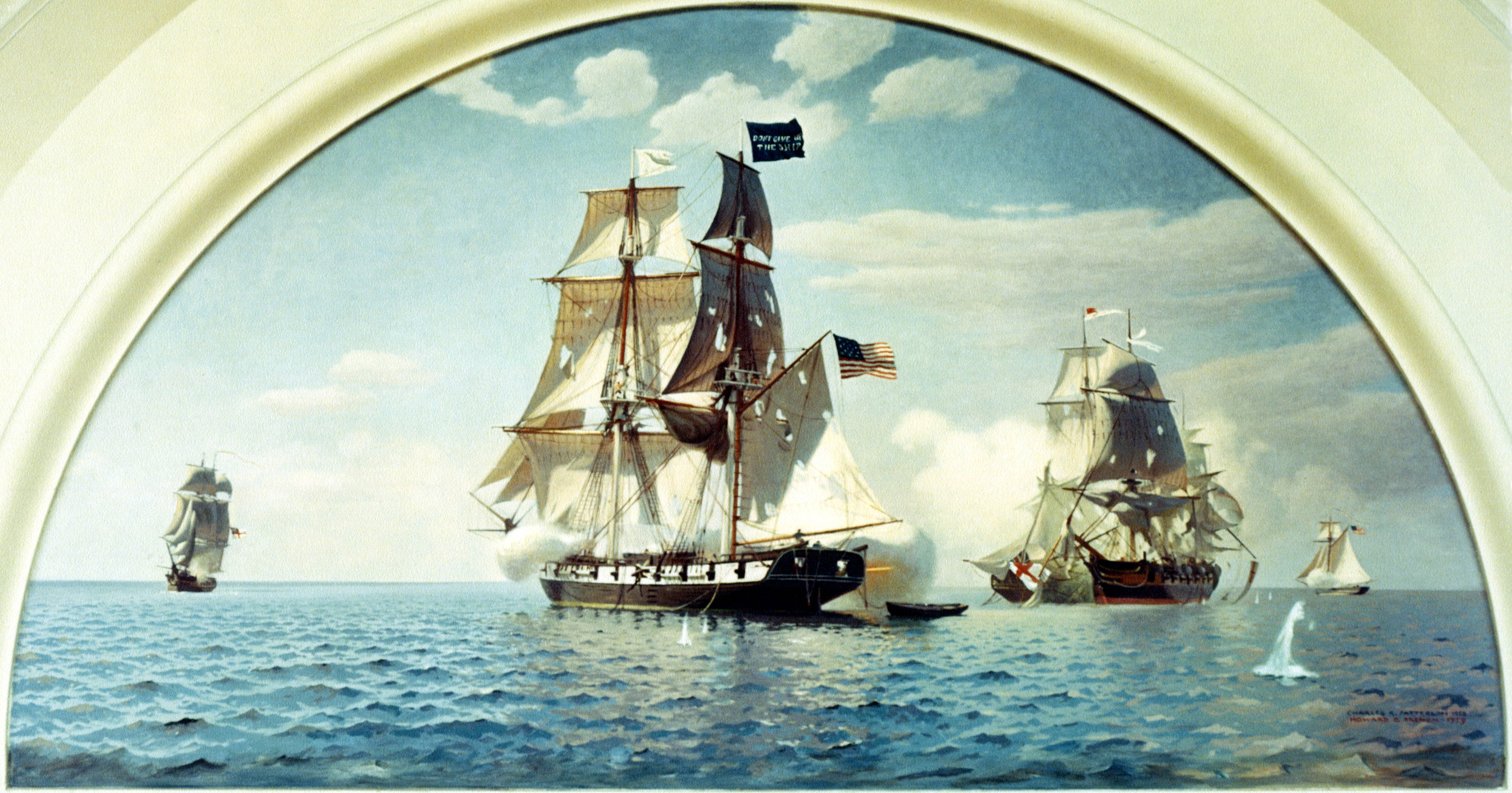
Niagara flying Perry's Don't Give Up the Ship battle ensign at the Battle of Lake Erie, 10 September 1813.

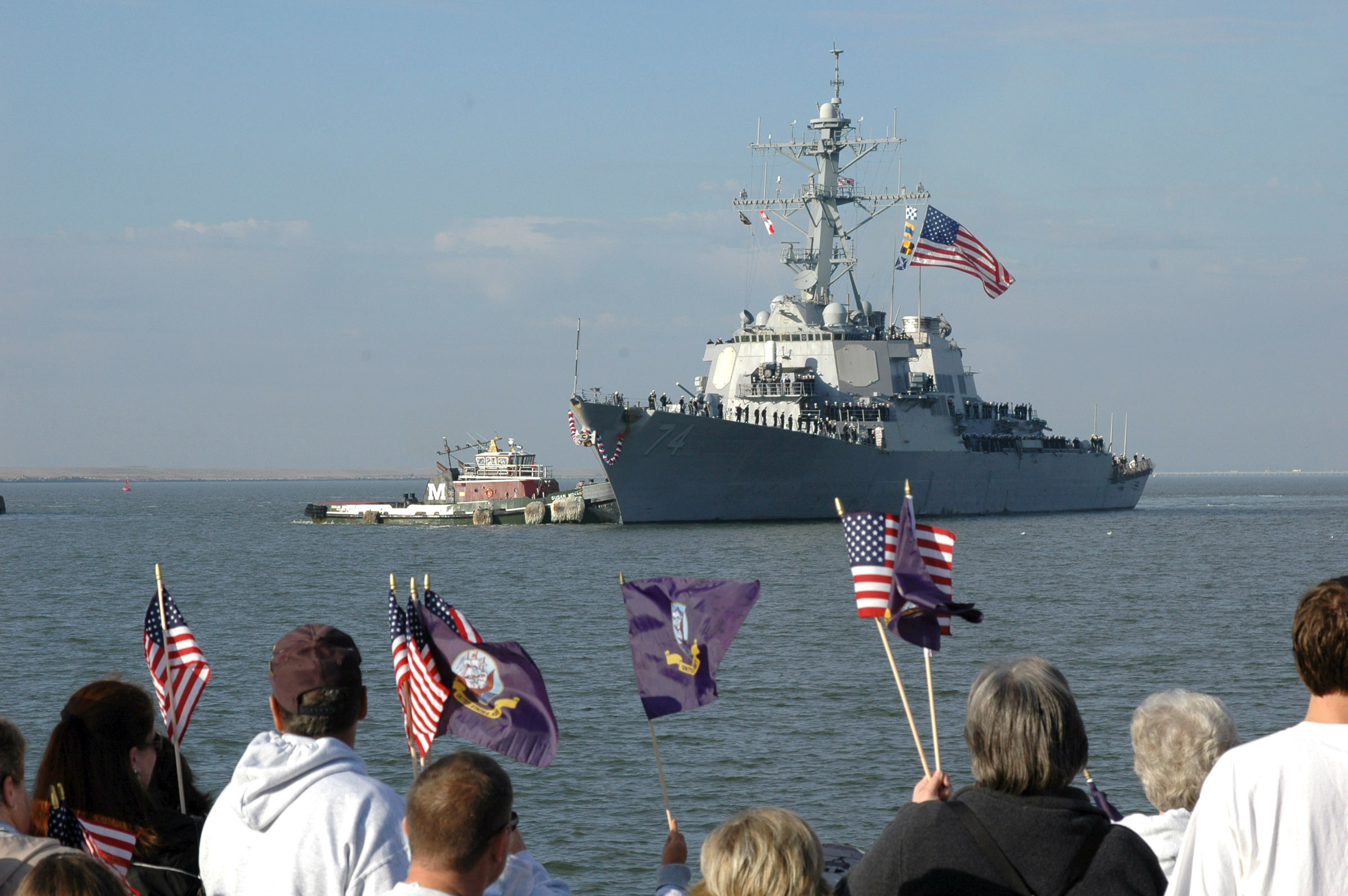
USS McFaul flying her battle ensign as she returns to Naval Station Norfolk, Virginia from deployment.

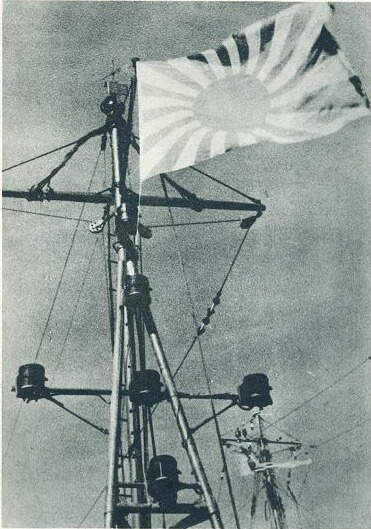
Battle ensign of the Imperial Japanese Navy.

A battle ensign is the name given to a large war ensign (flag) hoisted on a warship's mast just before going into battle.

In what could become a very confusing situation with thick clouds of gunsmoke the ensign gave additional identification, hence their large size, which for the Royal Navy in the 17th and 18th centuries was about 20 by 40 ft (6.1 by 12.2 m). It was commonly accepted that so long as a ship flew its ensign it was an active participant in battle; prior to action it was an acceptable ruse to fly a false flag.

If a ship surrendered then it would take down its ensign (which was known as striking the colors). This is also the origin of the phrase "To nail one's colours to the mast", showing a determination to fight on and never surrender. In practice, warships would fly more than one battle ensign, so that if the flag was destroyed or brought down during the fighting there would be no confusion. Conversely, keeping the flag flying even though the ship might appear to be past fighting was a sign of determination rather than foolishness. The German battleship Bismarck continued to fly its battle ensign even after all its gun batteries had been silenced by British shells, and sank with the ensign still flying.

The battle ensign was seen as an important element for the morale of the crew and was held in high regard. If a warship was sinking and had to be abandoned, flags such as the battle ensigns would be taken off the ship before it sank and were entrusted to the senior (surviving) officer.

Some countries use their national flag as the battle ensign, while others use their naval ensign. Sometimes unique flags were made and used as battle ensigns, for example the one flown by United States Naval Forces at the Battle of Lake Erie in the War of 1812.

The battle ensign is sometimes also flown by U.S. Navy warships as a courtesy when entering or leaving foreign ports, or on national holidays when it is referred to as "Holiday Colors."

== Examples ==
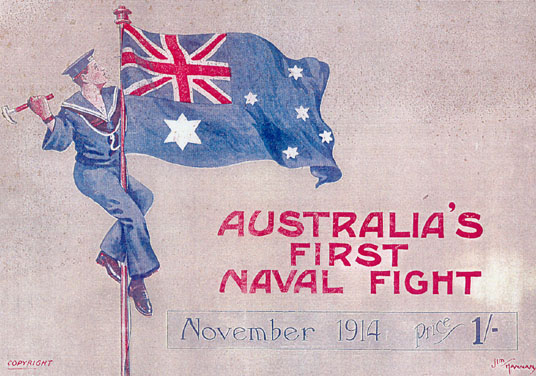
Postcard commemorating the naval victory of Australian light cruiser HMAS Sydney over the German light cruiser Emden at the Battle of Cocos in 1914.

In the United States Navy, battle ensigns from American warships and battle ensigns captured from enemy ships are displayed at the United States Naval Academy at Annapolis, Maryland. The battle ensign flown from USS Arizona during the attack on Pearl Harbor by the Japanese Naval Air Forces on December 7, 1941 was badly stained with oil and it was burned as being 'unfit for further use', before anyone thought to save it.

From the start of the Naval Battle of Casablanca during Operation Torch, the USS Massachusetts flew an extra-large battle ensign in the hopes the French Forces would decide not to fight the U.S. Navy. The French decided to fight, and the Massachusetts continued to fly the large battle ensign, throughout the battle.

The USS Ramage uses the flag of the New York City Police Department as its battle ensign in commemoration of the actions of the NYPD during the September 11 attacks.

The British National Maritime Museum has in its collection a battle ensign taken from the Spanish San Ildefonso, captured at the Battle of Trafalgar which measures 9.8 by 14.4 m (32 by 47 ft).

An ensign from the French Généreux of 8.2 by 16 m (27 by 52 ft) was captured by HMS Foudroyant in 1800, and presented by its captain, one time Flag Captain of Lord Nelson, to the City of Norwich.

On 9 November 1914, HMAS Sydney wore a large Australian National Flag as a battle ensign from the mainmast during her celebrated victory over German warship SMS Emden at the Battle of Cocos. The battle was the first naval clash and first victory for the Royal Australian Navy.

In the early days of World War II Captain F. S. Bell of the cruiser HMS Exeter gave the order to hoist five 24' by 12' (7·32m by 3·66m) battle ensigns from the main topmast, port and starboard yardarms, the top mizzen and the lower mizzen as Exeter turned to engage the German pocket battleship Admiral Graf Spee, which significantly outgunned her (660lb shells against 256lb shells), during the Battle of the River Plate.

During the battle of the North Cape, after being ordered to close with and engage the German battleship Scharnhorst with torpedoes, Captain Skule Storheill of the Norwegian destroyer HNoMS Stord ordered the ship's battle ensign to be hoisted on the mainmast, so "those bastards can see who they're dealing with!"

== See also ==
- British ensigns
- Russian Navy Ensign
- Japanese ensigns
- Vexillology
- Flag terminology
- War flag
