= Nailing the colours =

Indication of defiance in naval battle

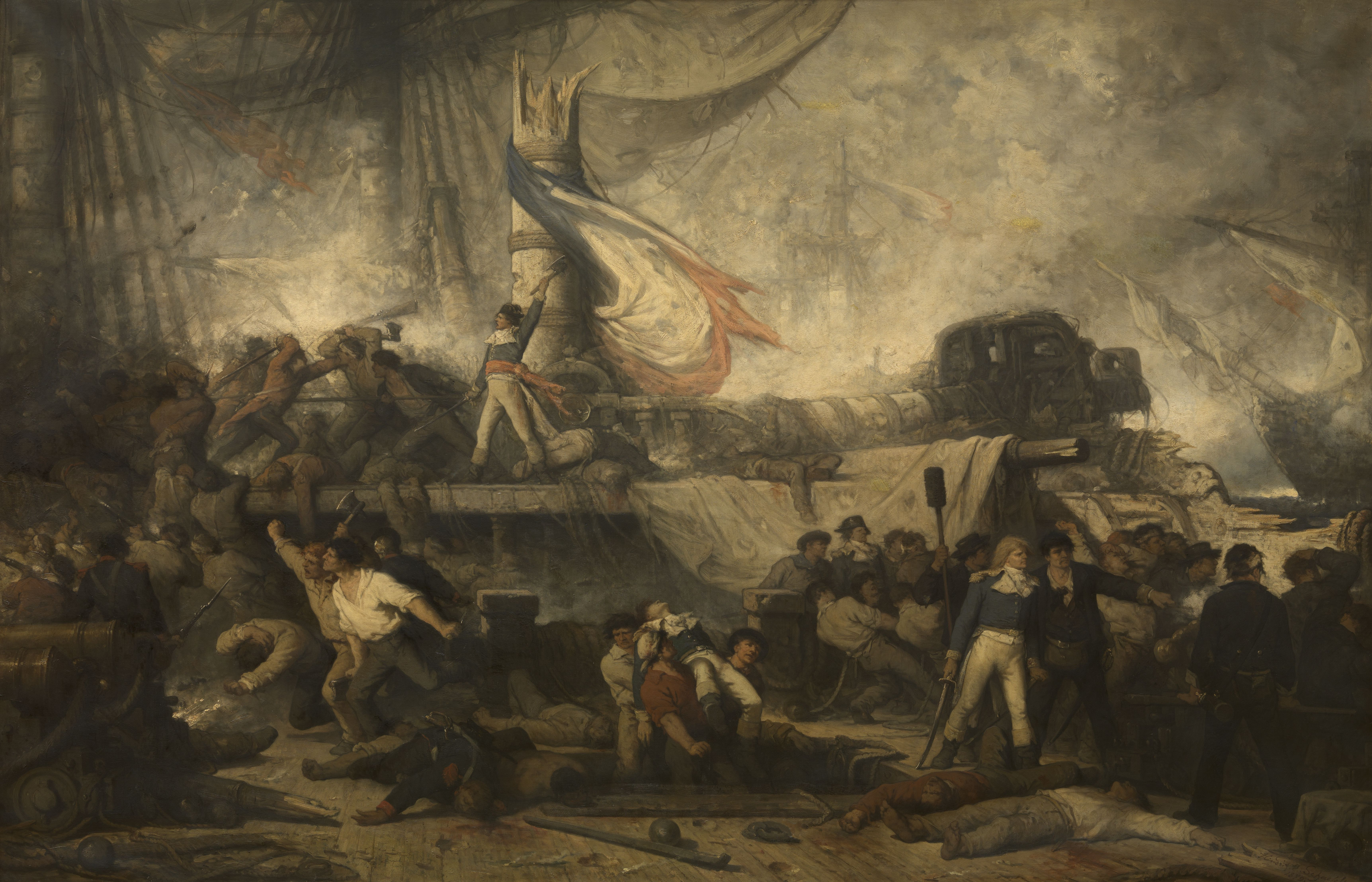
1879 painting of Algésiras at the Battle of Trafalgar showing the ship's colours nailed to a mast

Nailing the colours (also nailing the colours to the mast or nailing the flag) is a practice dating back to the Age of Sail that expresses a defiant refusal to surrender, and willingness to fight to the last man.

During the Age of Sail, ships would legally fight only while flying their national flag. Flying another flag was considered to be a legitimate ruse de guerre only until the beginning of the fight. Striking the colours was a sign of surrender. Indeed, when shot or shrapnel felled a ship's flag (such as by severing the halyard that held it up), her opponent would cease firing and inquire whether she was capitulating.

In contrast, fixing the battle ensign with nails would prevent it from being removed easily, and effectively prevented the surrender. It became an expression of defiance and willingness to force oneself to fight up to the bitter end.

The practice became a powerful and recurrent propaganda tool during the French Revolutionary Wars. It actually happened on the Tonnant at the Battle of the Nile and on the San Juan Nepomuceno at the Battle of Trafalgar. It was also wrongly claimed that the Vengeur du Peuple had done so during the Glorious First of June, when she had in fact struck. In the Royal Navy, Jack Crawford became famous for the deed after climbing the British flagship's mast under fire at the Battle of Camperdown.

== See also ==
- With flying colours
- Battle of Mobile Bay, section "Farragut lashed to the rigging"
