= Coat of arms of Sunderland =

The Coat of arms of Sunderland City Council, granted by the College of Arms in 1992

The coat of arms of Sunderland is the official heraldic arms of the City of Sunderland in England.

The Sunderland Corporation first assumed a heraldic device in the 19th century. The first grant of arms was made in 1947, and this was not amended in 1967 when additional territory was incorporated into the County Borough of Sunderland.

In 1974, on the creation of the Metropolitan Borough of Sunderland, new arms were granted essentially the old arms with amendments to reflect the new incorporated areas, and in 1992 when Sunderland was created a City an entirely new grant of arms was made, the main charges being quite unlike any previous grant.

== Motto ==
Sunderland has used Nil desperandum Auspice Deo ("When God is on our side there is no cause for despair." or "Do not despair, have faith in God" or "Don’t despair, in God we trust") as a motto since 1849. It is taken from the Odes of Horace, Book 1, Ode 7, line 27.

== 1849–1949 ==
These arms were assumed, so there is no official blazon. These arms were generally seen only embossed or printed in monochrome, so the usual blazon was "Argent, a sextant sable", however when used on street furniture various colours were used, often depending on what was available to the painter.

== 1949–1974 ==
Argent a sextant Sable on a chief Azure two keys wards upwards and outwards in saltire Argent between as many mitres of the last, both enfiled with a ducal coronet Or

For crest: On a wreath Argent and Azure a lymphad Sable, the sail Azure charged with the cross of St Cuthbert Argent flying flags Argent charged with a cross Gules.

For supporters: On a mount Or, on either side a lion Argent that on the dexter side supporting an anchor and the really scary pickaxe.

As a motto: Nil desperandum auspice Deo

This, the first official grant, continued the nautical theme, retaining the sextant and adding the lymphad as a crest. The crest and the chief acknowledge St Cuthbert by using "St Cuthbert's crosses", as well as the Bishop of Durham, who formerly controlled much of the land in the area. Sunderland's first charters were granted by the Bishops in the 15th century.

=== 1967 ===
No changes were made to reflect the amalgamation Sunderland Borough with Sunderland Rural District in 1967. The arms of the Rural District Council were very similar, and ceased to be used.

== 1889–1945 ==
Argent a quadrant Sable; on a chief wavy azure between two crosses of Saint Cuthbert an ancient ship sail set Or, flying flags and pennon of Saint George.

For crest: On a wreath Argent and Azure, on a mount Vert, in front of a long cross pommy issuant Gules the head interlaced with an orle Argent a boar passant Sable armed and langued Gules.

For supporters: On either side a lion Argent, that on the dexter side gorged with a collar gemel enclosing six mullets, three being manifest, Gules, and standing on an anchor fesswise the flukes inward Or, that on the sinister gorged with a collar gemel Sable enclosing six ears of wheat, three being manifest, proper, standing on a miner's pick fesswise the head inward Or.

For a badge: A fountain fimbriated Or and charged with a quadrant Sable.

As a motto: Nil desperandum auspice Deo

The massive local government reorganisation of 1974, and the incorporation of more outlying areas presented the opportunity for a comprehensive redrawing, adding collars and a new crest to represent the various areas of the borough.
Shield and supporters are from the arms of the County Borough of Sunderland. The quadrant was first used in the area in the 17th century, whilst the chief wavy (for the River Wear) includes the cross of St Cuthbert, representing the bishops and monks of Wearmouth. The supporters' collars represent the areas added by the Local government reorganisation in 1974. Dexter for Washington has - the stars and stripes from the Washington family coat of arms. Sinister, for Hetton's agricultural interests has black fimbriation to represent the rails of the first steam hauled wagonway in the country, taking coal from Hetton to the River Wear. The crest is for Houghton le Spring, combining symbols of the le Spring family, the district's Patron Saint, St Michael, and a local rector - Bernard Gilpin. The supporters stand on a pick and anchor for the coal mining and shipbuilding industries.

== 1992-to date ==
Although the grant of 1974 was made to the Council of the Borough of Sunderland and its successors regardless of their names, elevation to city status in 1992 was celebrated with a new grant of arms, which city officials requested had "not as much white" as previous arms.

Azure between in Chief and in Base a Bar wavy Argent charged with a like Barrulet Azure a Crown flory Or the circlet charged with four Saltires couped Gules

For crest: Upon a Helm with a Wreath Or and Azure upon Water barry wavy Azure Argent Azure a Lymphad with oars in action proper each Castle charged with two Crosses of Saint Cuthbert (one manifest) Or a sail of the Arms pennon and flags Gules Mantled Azure doubled Or.

For supporters: On the Dexter side a lion Or, armed and langued Gules gorged with a collar argent fimbriated Sable charged with six ears of wheat proper(three manifest), dependent therefrom a Roundel per bend wavy Or and Azure charged with a Cross pommy Gules entwined by an Orle Argent standing on an Anchor the flukes inward Or and on the Sinister side a Lion Azure armed and langued Gules gorged with a collar Argent fimbriated Gules charged with six mullets also Gules (three manifest) dependent therefrom a Roundel per bend wavy Or and Azure charged with a Boar's Head close couped Gules armed Or standing on a Miner's Pick ward Or the head turned inwards also Gold

The badge an Estoile Gules charged with a Crown Flory Or the circlet charged with four Saltires couped Gules has five arms to represent the new and tradition industries now in the city.

The motto, Nil desperandum auspice Deo, has traditionally been used by Sunderland.

Sunderland gained city status in the fortieth year of Queen Elizabeth's reign, and each saltire supposedly represents ten years of that reign. However, in the definitive painting, on the letters patent, the each crown has two and two half-saltires visible. Usually this implies another two and two half-saltires on the invisible half of the circlet. When used by the council the crowns have four full saltires visible. Although the traditional sextant, as a reminder of Sunderland's shipping history has been lost, the supporters and crest still retain the reminders of the inland areas of the city.

== Sources ==
- Civic Heraldry: Sunderland Metropolitan Borough Council
- Civic Heraldry: Sunderland County Borough Council
- Civic Heraldry: Sunderland City Council
