= HMS Pique =

Seven ships of the Royal Navy have borne the name HMS Pique:

- HMS Pique (1795) was formerly the French ship Pique, a 38-gun fifth rate captured by HMS Blanche (1786) in 1795. HMS Pique was wrecked in action with the French ship Seine in 1798.
- HMS Pique was formerly the French ship Pallas, a 36-gun fifth rate, captured in 1800 by a squadron off the coast of France. She was initially named HMS Aeolus but renamed to Pique in 1801. Because Pique served in the navy's Egyptian campaign (2 March to 8 September 1801), her officers and crew qualified for the clasp "Egypt" to the Naval General Service Medal, which the Admiralty issued in 1847 to all surviving claimants. She was sold for breaking up in 1819.
- HMS Pique was a 46-gun fifth rate ordered in 1825, but cancelled in 1832.
- HMS Pique (1834) was a 36-gun fifth rate launched in 1834, and sent to the eastern Mediterranean in 1840 as part of a squadron under HMS Cambridge. She was converted to a receiving ship in 1872, lent as a hospital hulk in 1882 and sold in 1910.
- HMS Pique (1890) was an Aeolus-class second-class cruiser, launched in 1890 and sold to the breakers in 1911.
- HMS Pique was a C-class destroyer ordered in April 1942, but cancelled in November, and reordered as HMS Carysfort (R25).
- HMS Pique (J23) was a Catherine-class minesweeper, previously planned to be named HMS Celerity, but renamed in 1942. She was transferred to the Royal Navy under the terms of Lend Lease in 1942 and returned to the United States Navy in 1946. She was transferred to Turkey in March 1947 and renamed Ereğli. She was stricken in 1973.
