= Jack Crawford (sailor) =

British Royal Navy sailor (1775–1831)

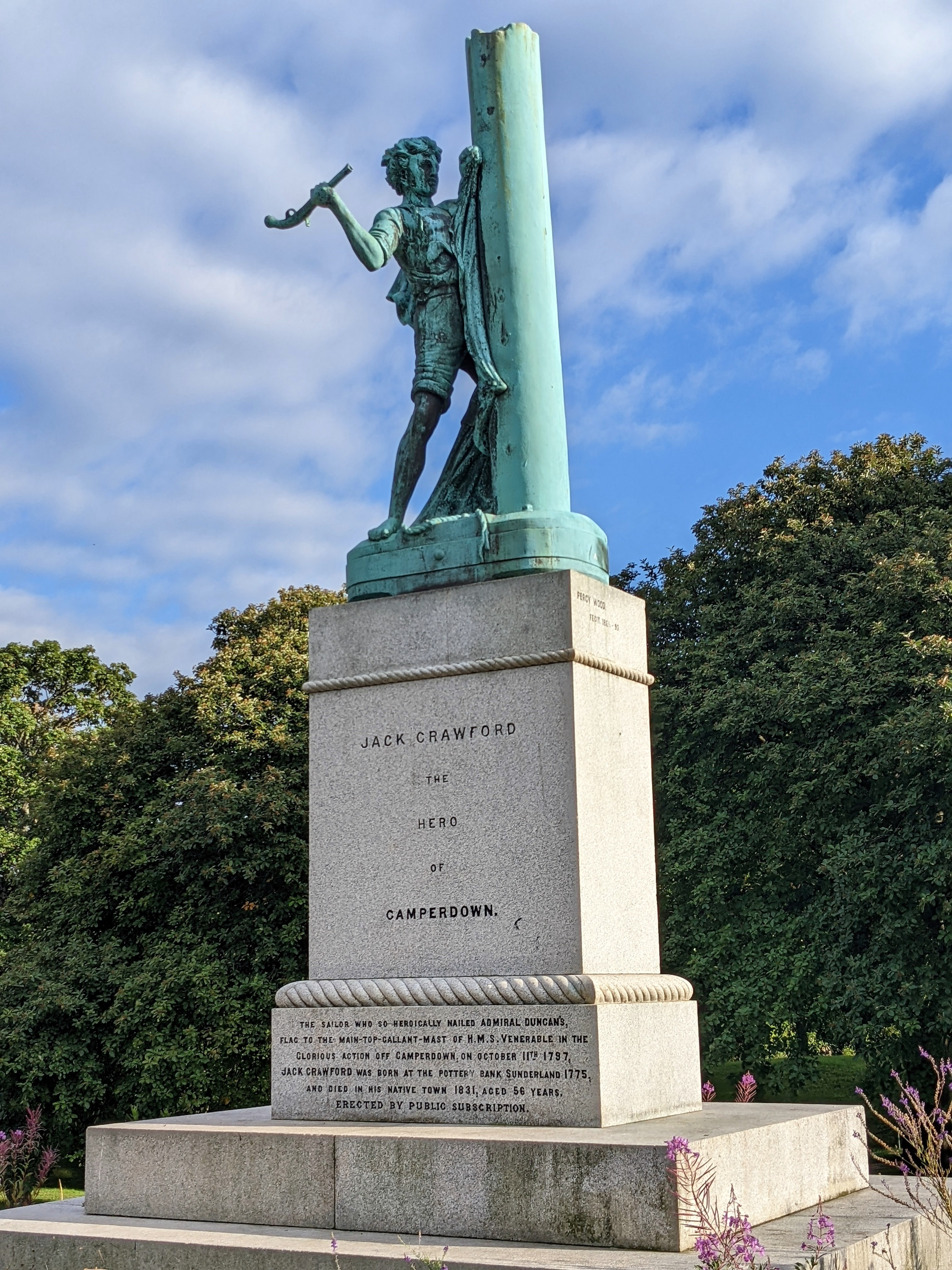
- Statue of Jack Crawford in Mowbray Park, Sunderland
- Born: 22 March 1775; Thornhill's Bank, Sunderland
- Died: 10 November 1831 (aged 56)
- Military career
- Allegiance: Kingdom of Great Britain
- Branch: Royal Navy
- Units: HMS Venerable
- Conflicts: French Revolutionary Wars

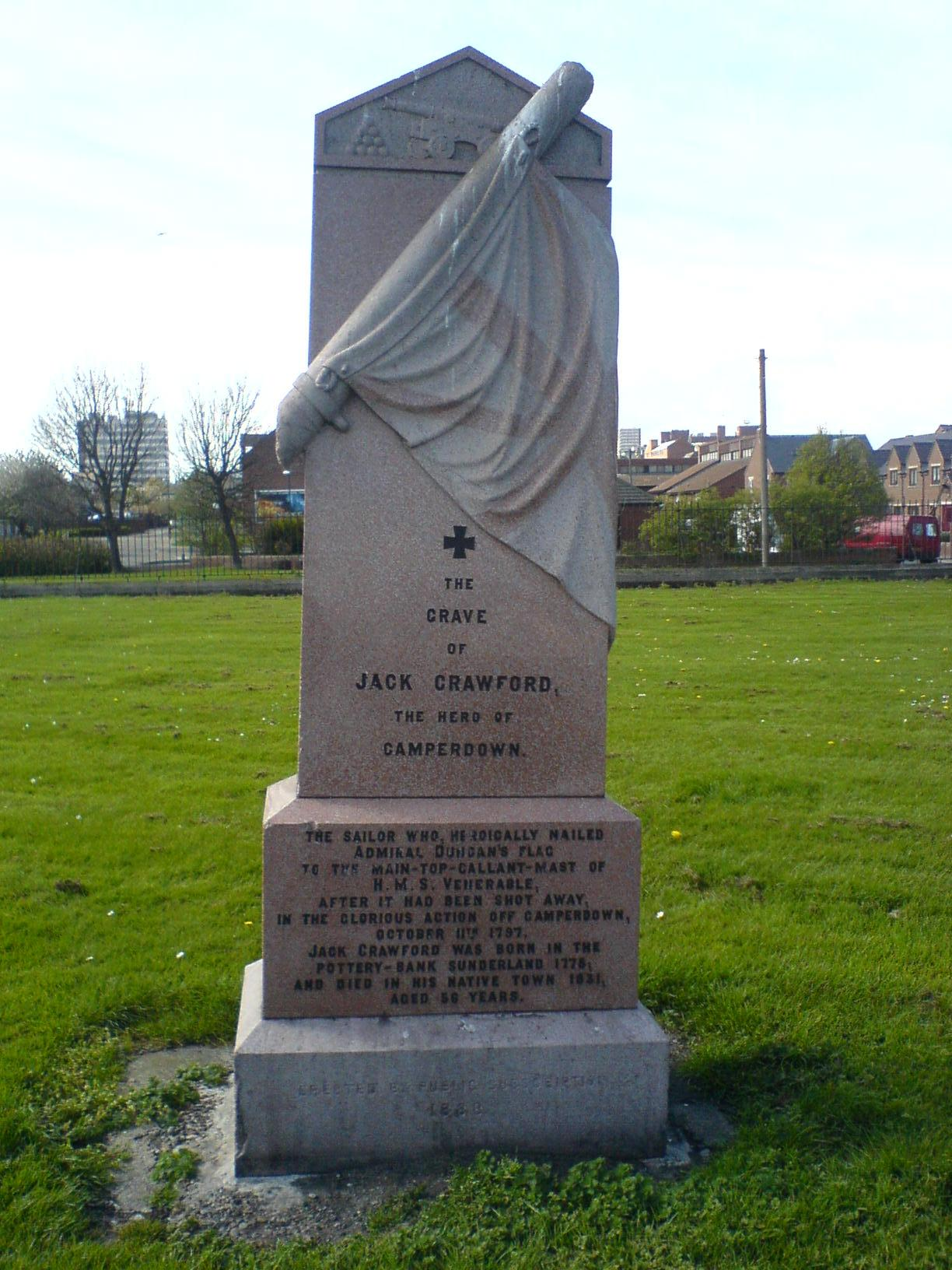
Crawford's headstone at Holy Trinity graveyard in the East End.

Jack Crawford (22 March 1775 – 10 November 1831) was a sailor of the Royal Navy known as the "Hero of Camperdown."

== Biography ==
Crawford was born in Thornhill's Bank (now Pottery Bank) in the East End of Sunderland. He was a keelman until 1786 when, aged 11 or 12, he joined the crew of the Peggy at South Shields as an apprentice. He joined the Royal Navy in 1796, possibly as a result of being press-ganged but he may have volunteered, and served on HMS Venerable under Admiral Duncan the Royal Navy Commander-in-Chief of the North Seas.

At the Battle of Camperdown off the Dutch coast (11 October 1797), Venerable was Admiral Duncan's flagship. During the battle, part of the Venerable's mast was felled, including the admiral's flag. Lowering the Admiral's personal flag was a sign of surrender, and even an unintentional fall was unacceptable. Despite being under intense gunfire, Crawford climbed the mast and nailed the colours to the top.

After the victory procession in London he was formally presented to the King and was given a government pension of £30 a year, and later a silver medal from the people of Sunderland. However, Crawford fell on hard times and drunkenness, and had to sell his medal. He became the second victim of the cholera epidemic of 1831 and was buried in an unmarked "pauper's" grave.

== Legacy ==
Towards the end of the nineteenth century interest in the 'Hero of Camperdown' was renewed, in part through the success of the popular play "Jack Crawford the Hero of Camperdown" by Sunderland-based playwright James Roland MacLaren, which went on tour from 1879. This resulted in the erection of a headstone in Holy Trinity, Sunderland churchyard in 1888. Two years later public donations led to a monument being erected in Mowbray Park, opposite the former Sunderland Civic Centre.

A pub in Monkwearmouth was named the Jack Crawford and sported a carved figure of him on the side of the building. This is referred to in the North-Country Lore and Legend magazine for April 1887 (page 91). After the pub was destroyed during World War II, the figure was removed. In 1987 it was loaned to Sunderland Museum and put on display in the local history gallery but has been returned to the owner. The Museum holds Jack Crawford in high regard. There was an exhibition about him on the bicentenary of the Battle of Camperdown and there was a display about him in SeaBritain Year (2005). One of the Learning Rooms is named after him and there are several pieces of nineteenth-century Jack Crawford commemorative pottery on display in the Pottery Gallery. The silver medal that was presented to him by the Town following the battle in 1797, and given to the Museum by the Earl of Camperdown in 1880, is proudly on display in the Sunderland Heroes section of the Museum Street near the entrance of this award-winning Museum.

Doubt has been raised about Crawford's heroics. Possible evidence that Crawford was not a volunteer, that he was forced to climb the mast, or that he was drunk is debated. One book, written by the American Sheri Holman, attracted criticism from the city's Mayor. However, local historian Watson Corder had already made the criticism in the 1890s; Corder thought little of Crawford. He claimed that it was reported by reliable witnesses that Crawford was "drunk, acted without orders, and should have been court-martialled". Furthermore, Corder dismissed as a "deplorable monument" what others called the "fine headstone" of 1888.

A folk song about and entitled Jack Crawford – written by Johnny Handle, the Tyneside singer and former member of the High Level Ranters – is frequently on British folk singer, Bob Fox's, set list.
