= Ravensworth (disambiguation) =

Ravensworth is a village and civil parish in the Richmondshire district of North Yorkshire, England.

Ravensworth may also refer to:

== Places ==
- Ravensworth, Queensland, Australia
- Ravensworth, Ontario, Canada
- Crosby Ravensworth, Cumbria, England
- Ravensworth Castle, Lamesley, Tyne and Wear, England
- Ravensworth, Virginia, United States

== Other uses ==
- Ravensworth (plantation), a historic house and plantation near Annandale in Fairfax County, Virginia
- Baron Ravensworth

== See also ==
- Ravensworth Castle (disambiguation)
