= Sir Hedworth Williamson, 8th Baronet =

British diplomat and Liberal Party politician

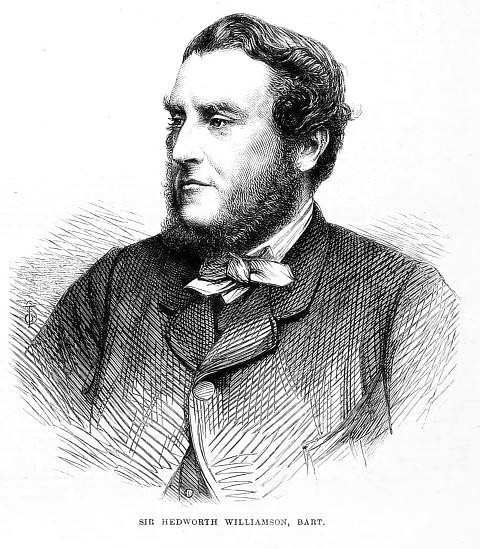

Sir Hedworth Williamson, 8th Baronet (25 March 1827 – 26 August 1900) was a British diplomat and Liberal Party politician who sat in the House of Commons from 1864 to 1874.

Williamson was the son of Sir Hedworth Williamson, 7th Baronet and his wife Hon. Anne Elizabeth Liddell, daughter of 1st Baron Ravensworth. He was educated at Eton College and at Christ Church, Oxford, later migrating to St John's College, Cambridge. He was an attache at St. Petersburgh from 1848 to 1850, and at Paris from 1850 till 1856. In 1861 he inherited the baronetcy on the death of his father. He was a Deputy Lieutenant and J.P. for Durham and Captain Commandant of the 1st Durham Volunteer Artillery for 28 years from its formation in 1860, later becoming its honorary colonel.

Williamson was elected as member of parliament (MP) for North Durham at an unopposed by-election in 1864, and held the seat until he stepped down at the 1874 general election. He was then appointed High Sheriff of Durham for 1877.

In 1880 Williamson donated land for Roker Park in Sunderland, which was opened on 23 June 1880.

Williamson married his cousin the Hon. Elizabeth Jane Hay Liddell, daughter of the 2nd Baron Ravensworth in 1863. Their son Hedworth inherited the baronetcy.

== Masonic career ==
Like his father, Sir Hedworth Williamson (7th Bart), he was a prominent Freemason. He was initiated into Palatine Lodge No 97, Sunderland, England, on 14 January 1847, at the age of 19 years. At that time the normal entry age into Freemasonry was 21 years old so a special dispensation was granted by the then Grand Master of the United Grand Lodge of England, the Earl of Zetland. Sir Hedworth was installed as the Worshipful Master of Palatine Lodge No 97 in December 1858, appointed Grand Warden of the United Grand Lodge of England in 1862 and held the rank of Provincial Grand Master of Durham from 1885 to 1900.

Parliament of the United Kingdom
Preceded by Lord Adolphus Vane-Tempest and Robert Duncombe Shafto	Member of Parliament for North Durham; 1864–1874; With: Robert Duncombe Shafto to 1868; George Elliot from 1868	Succeeded by Lowthian Bell and Charles Palmer
Baronetage of England
Preceded by Hedworth Williamson	Baronet (of East Markham ) 1861–1900	Succeeded by Hedworth Williamson
