= Williamson baronets of East Markham (1642) =

Escutcheon of the Williamson baronets of East Markham

The Williamson baronetcy, of East Markham in the County of Nottingham, was created in the Baronetage of England on 3 June 1642 for Thomas Williamson, Sheriff of Nottingham in 1639, a Royalist of the English Civil War.

The family seat moved to Whitburn Hall, near Sunderland, County Durham. The 4th Baronet served as High Sheriff of Durham 1723–1747. The 5th (1747–1788) and 6th Baronets (1789–1810) also served in that office.

The 7th Baronet sat as Whig Member of Parliament for County Durham 1831–2, and Sunderland 1847 and was High Sheriff in 1840. The 8th Baronet represented Durham North in the House of Commons 1864 to 1874. The 9th Baronet was High Sheriff in 1904.

The title became extinct on the death of the 11th Baronet in 2000.

== Williamson baronets, of East Markham (1642) ==
- Sir Thomas Williamson, 1st Baronet (1609–1657)
- Sir Thomas Williamson, 2nd Baronet (1636–1703)
- Sir Robert Williamson, 3rd Baronet (died 1707)
- Sir William Williamson, 4th Baronet (1681–1747)
- Sir Hedworth Williamson, 5th Baronet (c. 1710–1788)
- Sir Hedworth Williamson, 6th Baronet (1751–1810)
- Sir Hedworth Williamson, 7th Baronet (1797–1861)
- Sir Hedworth Williamson, 8th Baronet (1827–1900)
- Sir Hedworth Williamson, 9th Baronet (1867–1942)
- Sir Charles Hedworth Williamson, 10th Baronet (1903–1946)
- Sir Nicholas Frederick Hedworth Williamson, 11th Baronet (1937–2000), left no heir.
