= Henry Liddell, 1st Baron Ravensworth =

English noble (1708–1784)

The Right Honourable The Lord Ravensworth
- Born: Henry Liddell; 1708
- Died: 30 January 1784 (aged 75–76)
- Spouse: Anne Delme (m. 1735)
- Issue: Anne FitzPatrick, Countess of Upper Ossory

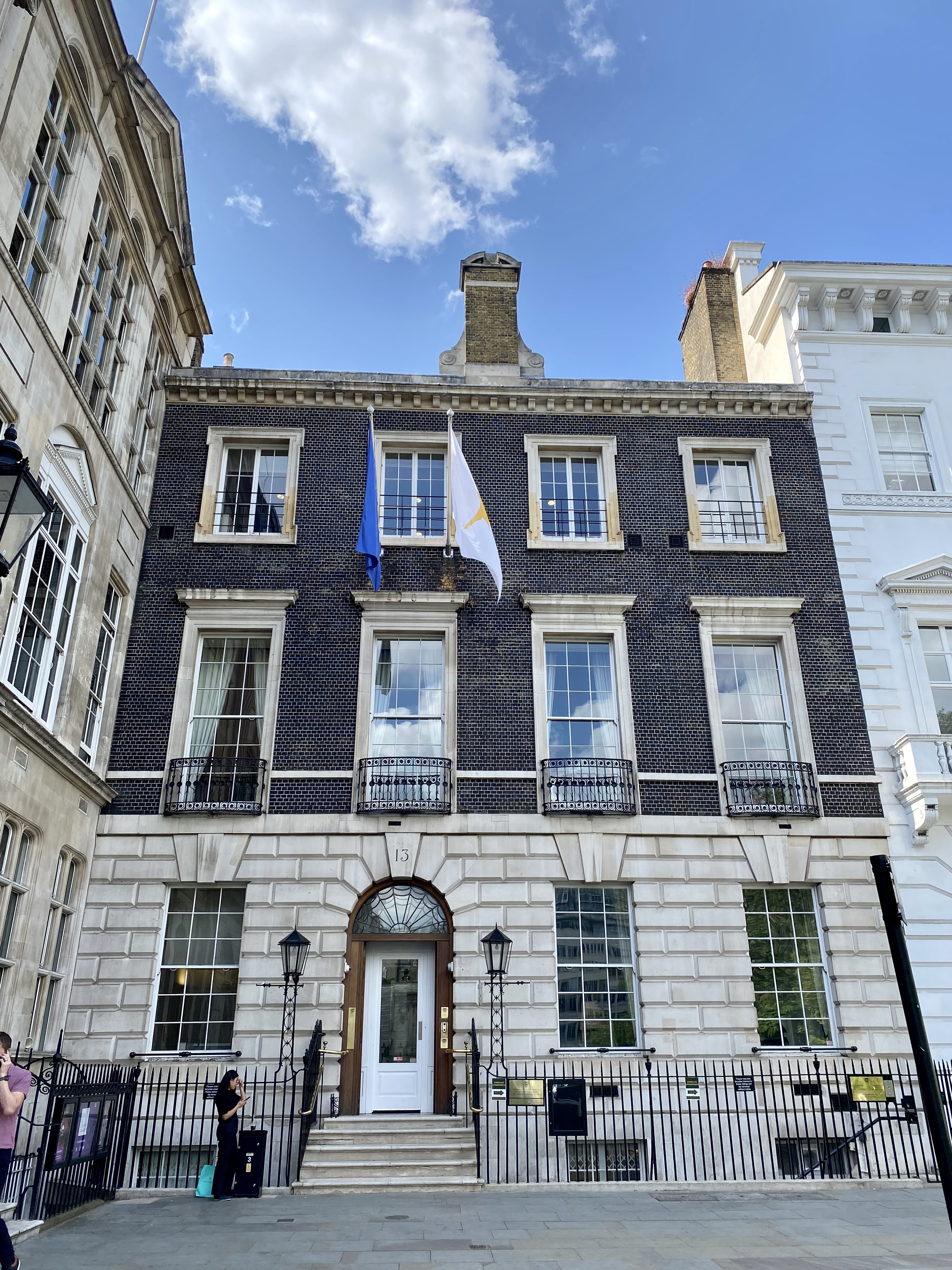
Liddle's London town house, 13 St. James's Square, commissioned by him and completed in 1737

Henry Liddell, 1st Baron Ravensworth (1708 – 30 January 1784) succeeded to the Baronetcy of Ravensworth Castle, and to the family estates and mining interests, at the age of fifteen, on the death of his grandfather in 1723. He was created 1st Baron Ravensworth on 29 June 1747.

He went to Peterhouse, Cambridge in 1725, and took the Grand Tour in the early 1730s.

He was Member of Parliament for Morpeth 1734–1747.

He was a founder member of the Grand Allies partnership created in 1726 by a group of wealthy land and colliery owners to cooperate in the further development of coal mining in Northumberland and County Durham. Their early investments included collieries at Gosforth, Heaton, New Benton, Tanfield, South Causey, North Biddick and Longbenton.

His seat was Ravensworth Castle, in Lamesley, Tyne and Wear, and his London address from 1735 was 13, St James's Square.

Liddell married Anne Delmé (daughter of Sir Peter Delmé) in 1735 and they had one daughter, Anne, who was a noted correspondent. She was the first wife of Augustus FitzRoy, 3rd Duke of Grafton (then Prime Minister of Great Britain) and later of John FitzPatrick, 2nd Earl of Upper Ossory. He was succeeded in the baronetcy by his nephew Henry. The barony was extinct on his death, but was later recreated in 1821 for his great-nephew Thomas.

== Notes ==
Parliament of Great Britain
Preceded by Viscount Morpeth; Thomas Robinson	Member of Parliament for Morpeth; 1734–1747; With: Viscount Morpeth 1734–1738; Henry Furnese 1738–1741; Robert Ord 1741–1747	Succeeded by Robert Ord; The Viscount Limerick
Peerage of Great Britain
New title	Baron Ravensworth; 1747–1784	Extinct
Baronetage of England
Preceded by Henry Liddell	Baronet (of Ravensworth Castle); 1723–1784	Succeeded by Henry Liddell
