= Hedworth Lambton =

Hedworth Lambton may refer to:

- Hedworth Lambton (MP) (1797–1876), Member of Parliament for North Durham 1832–1847
- Hedworth Meux or Hedworth Lambton (1856–1929), English Admiral of the Fleet during World War I
