= Ravensworth Castle =

Ravensworth Castle may refer to:

- Ravensworth Castle (North Yorkshire), in the village of Ravensworth
- Ravensworth Castle (Tyne and Wear), in the civil parish of Lamesley
