= Sir Hedworth Williamson, 7th Baronet =

English Whig politician

Sir Hedworth Williamson, 7th Baronet (1 November 1797 – 24 April 1861) was an English Whig politician who sat in the House of Commons in two periods between 1831 and 1852. He was educated at St John's College, Cambridge.

Williamson was the son of Sir Hedworth Williamson, 6th Baronet. He inherited the baronetcy from his father in 1810.

== Career ==
Williamson was elected Member of Parliament (MP) for County Durham at the 1831 general election and held the seat until 1832 when it was divided under the Great Reform Act. He was then elected at the 1832 general election as an MP for North Durham, and held the seat until he stood down at the 1837 general election. He was High Sheriff of Durham in 1840. In December 1847 he was elected at a by-election as MP for Sunderland and held the seat until he stood down at the 1852 general election.

== Masonic career ==
Sir Hedworth was a prominent Freemason. He was initiated into the Lambton Lodge No 375, Chester-Le-Street, County Durham, England, 9 December 1824. He joined Palatine Lodge No 97, Sunderland, on 18 December 1834 and was the Worshipful Master on three occasions, 1835, 1836 and 1840 and subsequently appointed Grand Warden of the United Grand Lodge of England. In 1840 he was installed as the Provincial Grand Master of Durham and held that position until 1845. Sir Hedworth Williamson had four sons Hedworth, 25 March 1827 – 1874, William Henry, born 14 October 1829, Charles 1 September 1833 and Victor Alexander, born 28 June 1828, all of which were members of Palatine Lodge No 97.

== Marriage and family ==
Williamson married Anne Elizabeth Liddell (1801–1878), daughter of the first Baron Ravensworth. Their son Hedworth succeeded to the baronetcy. Their daughter Maria Dorothea married David Barclay who was also an MP for Sunderland.

Parliament of the United Kingdom
Preceded by The Hon. William Powlett and William Russell	Member of Parliament for County Durham; 1831–1832; With: William Russell	Constituency divided
New constituency	Member of Parliament for North Durham; 1832–1837; With: Hedworth Lambton	Succeeded by Hedworth Lambton and The Hon. Henry Liddell
Preceded by David Barclay and George Hudson	Member of Parliament for Sunderland; 1847–1852; With: George Hudson	Succeeded by George Hudson and William Digby Seymour
Civic offices
Preceded by Richard White	Mayor of Sunderland; 1841–1842	Succeeded by Andrew White
Preceded by Robert Brown	Mayor of Sunderland; 1847	Succeeded by John Scott
Honorary titles
Preceded by Sir William Chaytor, Bt.	High Sheriff of Durham; 1840–1841	Succeeded by William Russell
Baronetage of England
Preceded by Hedworth Williamson	Baronet (of East Markham); 1810–1861	Succeeded by Hedworth Williamson
