= Rowland Burdon (died 1838) =

British politician

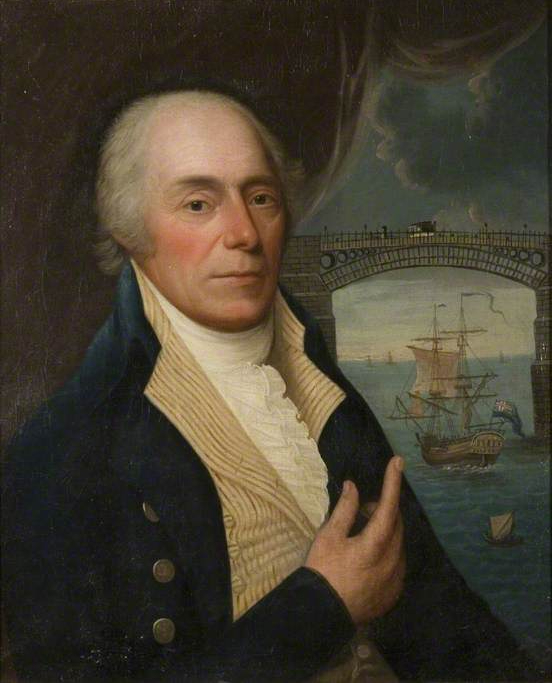
- Born: 1757
- Died: September 17, 1838 (aged 80–81)
- Occupations: landowner and politician

Rowland Burdon (c. 1757 – 17 September 1838) was an English landowner and Tory politician from Castle Eden in County Durham.

== Life ==
He was the only son of Rowland Burdon, a merchant and banker of Newcastle and Castle Eden and educated at the Royal Grammar School, Newcastle upon Tyne and University College, Oxford. He then took the Grand Tour.

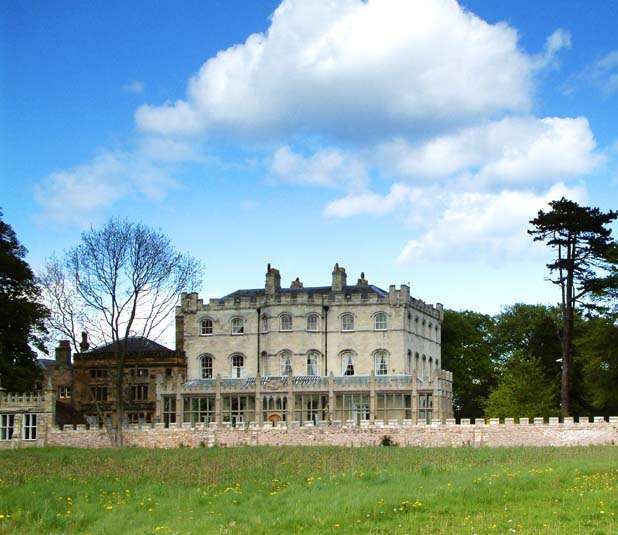
Burdon's seat in County Durham: the Castle, Castle Eden

On his return he became a partner in his father's bank, the Exchange Bank in Newcastle and inherited the Castle Eden estate on the death of his father in 1786. He was elected at the 1790 general election as one of the two Members of Parliament (MPs) for County Durham, and held the seat until the 1806 general election, which he did not contest. He was also Mayor of Stockton for 1793–94.

The Castle Eden Vase (or Beaker) was found on his estate in about 1775, by a labourer working on a hedge. The glass vase was a 6th-century Anglo-Saxon "claw beaker" which had been buried beside the skull of human body. It was presented to the British Museum in October 1947 by his great-great-granddaughter Mrs Sclater-Booth, in memory of her father Rowland Burdon (1857–1944).

He was a prominent Freemason and a member of the Sea Captain’s Lodge, which later became Palatine Lodge No. 97, in Sunderland. He was Worshipful Master of the Lodge in 1792, 4, 5 and 6.

Burdon is mentioned in "Sunderland Bridge", a poem which appears as "anonymous" in The Bishoprick Garland of 1834 by Sir Cuthbert Sharp. (The poem also appears under the authorship of "M W of North Shields" in Rhymes of Northern Bards by John Bell (junior).) The comments that are attached to the poem in The Bishoprick Garland state that he was responsible for the splendid bridge which linked the "Northsiders" of Sunderland to the rest of the Town, an achievement which was never fully appreciated, shown by the fact that the bridge had no official name and was called rather indifferently and uninterestedly, Sunderland Bridge, Wearmouth Bridge, or the Iron Bridge.

In 1803 his bank failed after being involved in speculation and he lost much of his fortune.

He died in 1838. He had married twice; firstly Margaret, the daughter of Charles Brandling and secondly Cotsford, the daughter and heiress of General Richard Matthews, with whom he had 4 sons and 3 daughters.

== See also ==
- The Bishoprick Garland of 1834
- Sir Cuthbert Sharp
- Rhymes of Northern Bards
- John Bell (junior)
- Wearmouth Bridge,

Parliament of the United Kingdom
Preceded by Sir Thomas Clavering, Bt; Sir John Eden, Bt	Member of Parliament for County Durham; 1790–1800; 1801–1806; With: Sir Ralph Milbanke	Succeeded by Sir Thomas Liddell; Sir Ralph Milbanke
