= Roker Park (park) =

Recreation park in England

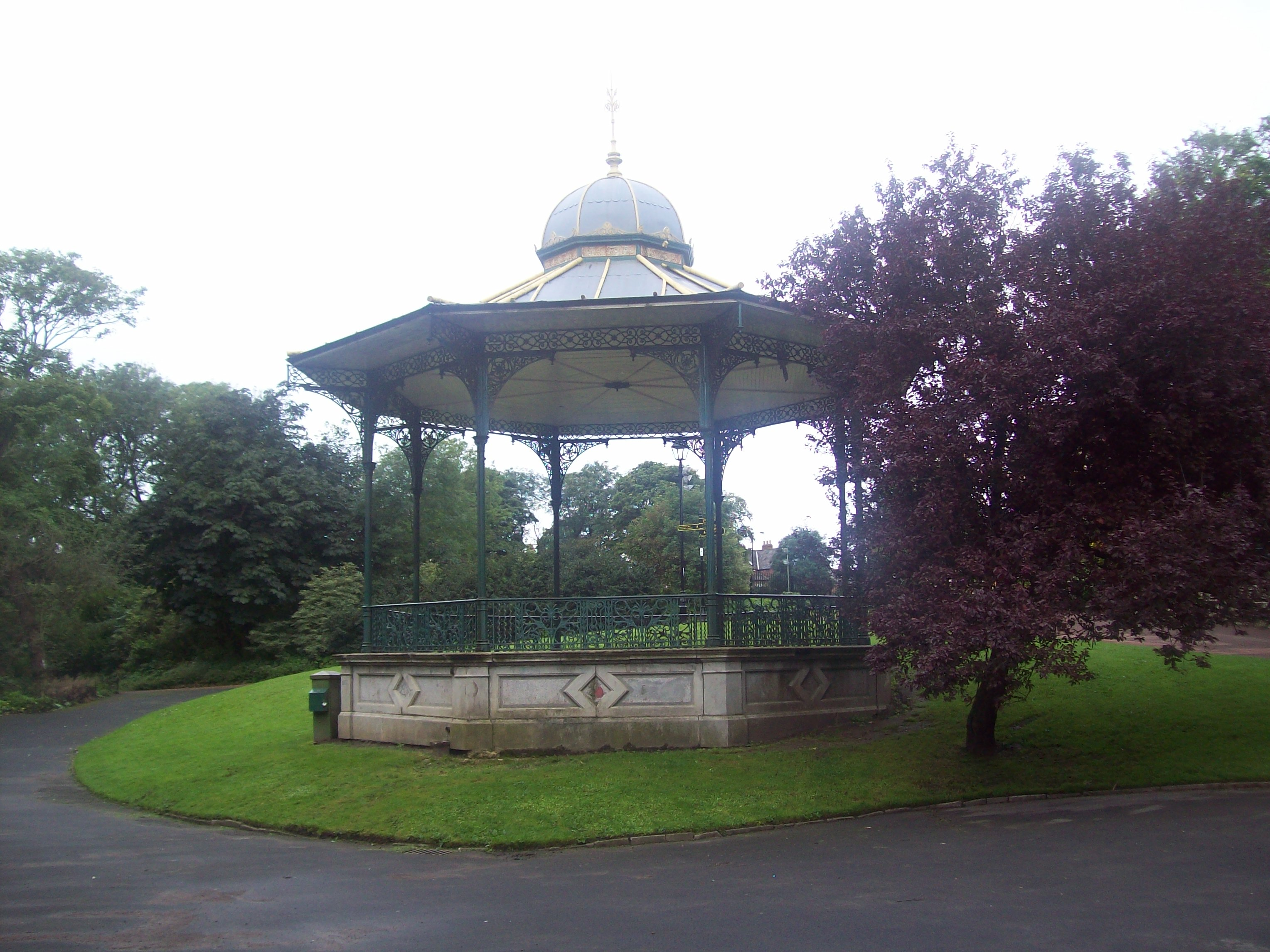
- The park bandstand
- Type: Municipal
- Location: Sunderland, United Kingdom
- Coordinates: 54°55′31.47″N 1°22′9.63″W
- Created: 1880
- Operated by: Sunderland City Council
- Status: Open all year

Roker Park is a recreation park in the Roker area of Sunderland, Tyne and Wear, England.

The land on which the park stands was donated by Sir Hedworth Williamson, 8th Baronet and the Church Commissioners, and opened on 23 June 1880. The park is roughly an upside down reversed 'L' shape. It is bounded by Park Parade to the south, Roker Park Terrace to the east, Roker Park Road to the west and Side Cliff Road to the north. The northern part of the park is the widest and fronts onto Roker beach via a ravine, which passes under a wooden footbridge. In the centre of the park is a large freeform boating lake which is used for remote-controlled model boating. In the northwest corner of the park is a model narrow gauge railtrack which was built in the 1970s. There are two bowling greens as well as tennis and multi-purpose sports courts.

== Listed buildings ==
=== Bandstand ===
The park's bandstand is octagonal, cast-iron with a wood base and a metal-covered roof.

=== Drinking fountain ===
The memorial drinking fountain in the park commemorates Sir Hedworth's gift of land for Roker Park. It is made of ashlar, sandstone and granite and was erected by 'scholars, teachers and friends of Sunday Schools in Sunderland to commemorate the celebration of the centenary of Sunday Schools and the opening of Roker Park June 23 1880.

== Sunderland Illuminations ==
Sunderland Illuminations were formerly held in Roker Park and Seaburn from late September until early November, branded as the Festival of Light, until their move to Mowbray Park in Sunderland city centre.

== Gallery ==
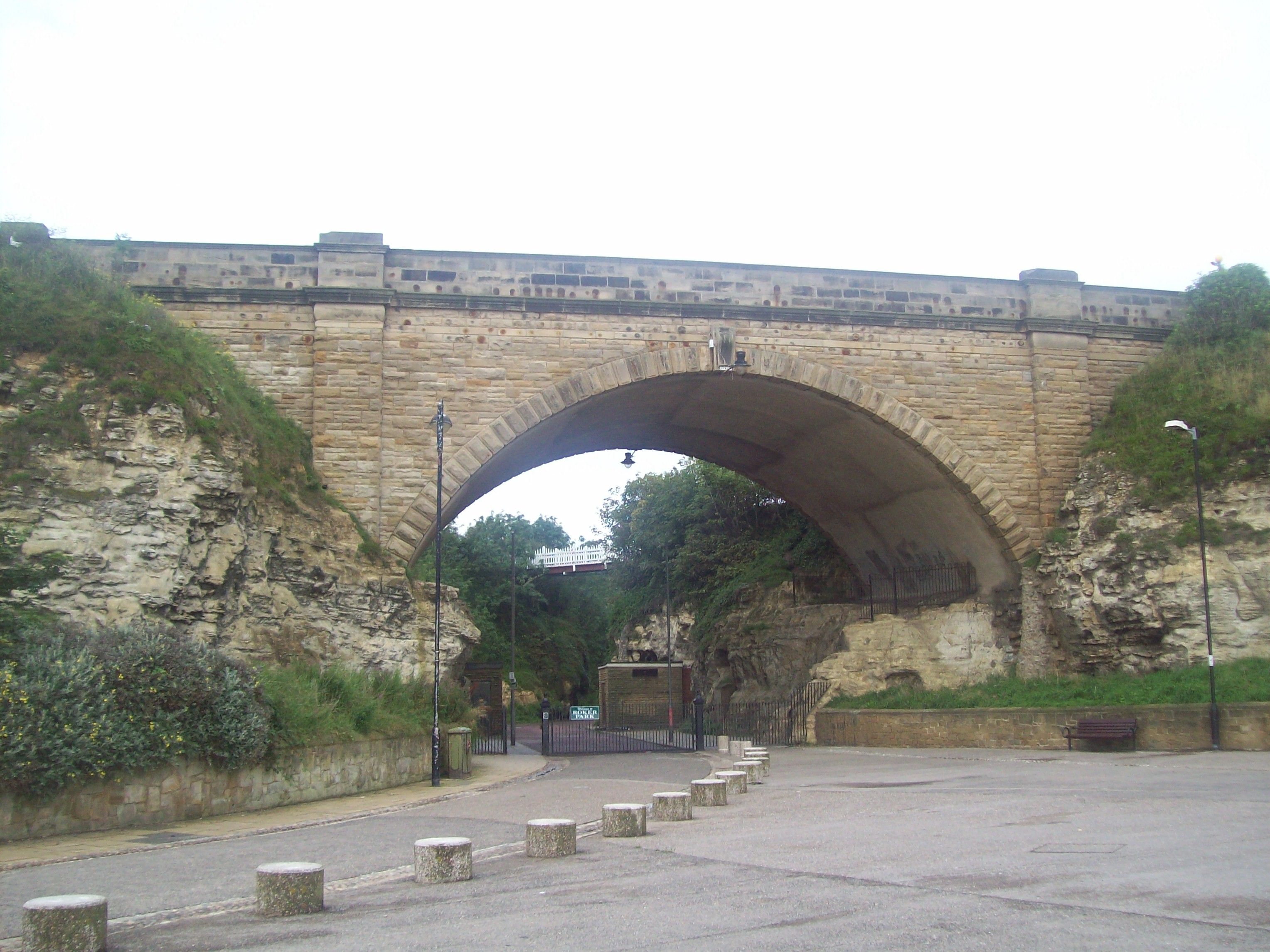
The bridge carrying the A183 coast road over Roker Park Ravine

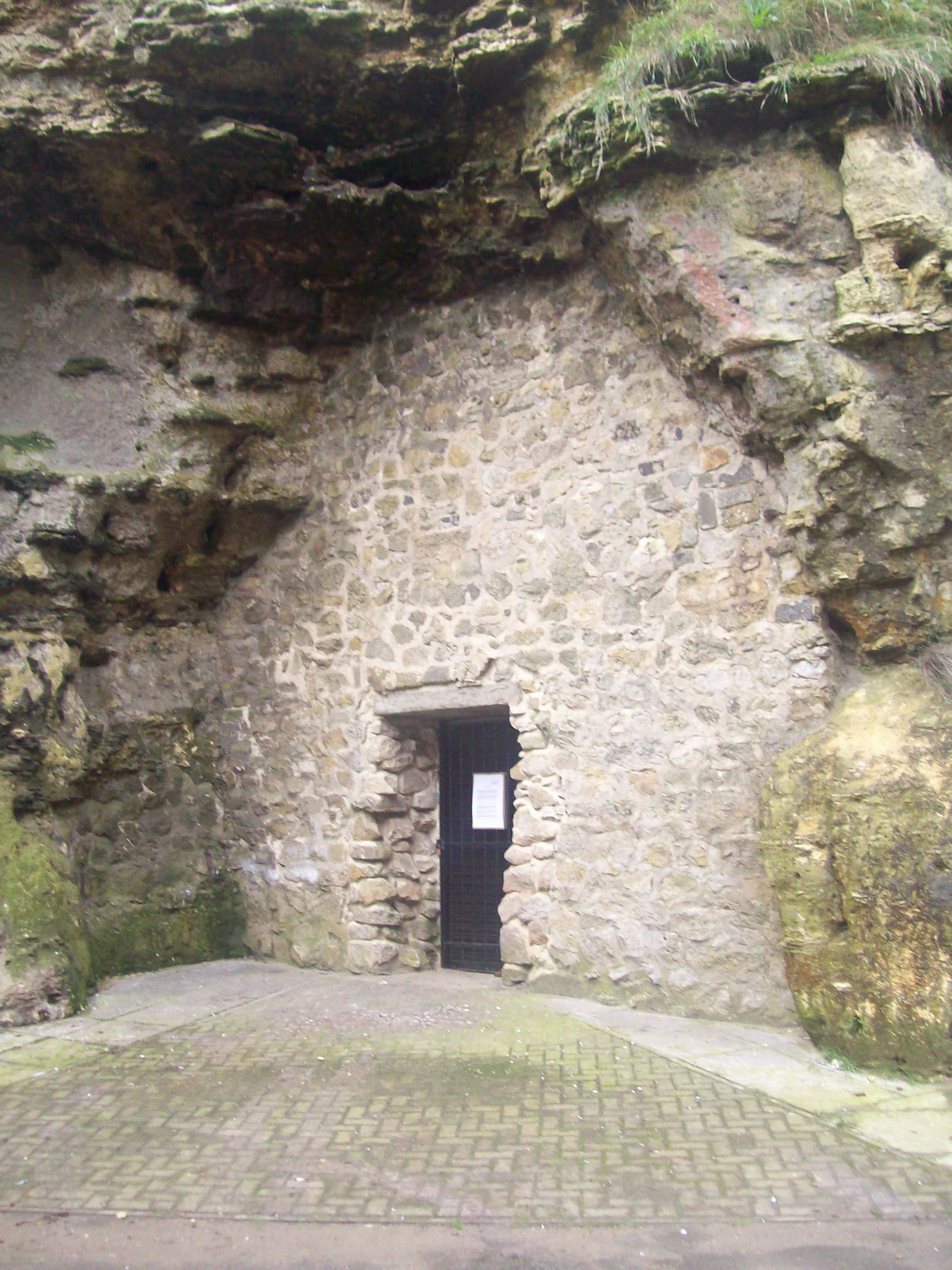
"Spottee's Cave"
