= John Joicey =

British Liberal Party politician and wealthy coal owner

John Joicey, DL (3 November 1816 – 15 August 1881) was a British Liberal Party politician and wealthy coal owner.

He was the fourth son of George Joicey of Backworth, Northumberland and uncle of James Joicey, 1st Baron Joicey.

With his younger brother James Joicey, in 1831 he founded mining company James Joicey & Co Ltd (incorporated in 1886), which operated several collieries in the West Durham coalfield including pits at Beamish and Tanfield. In 1924, that company merged with Lambton & Hetton Collieries to form Lambton, Hetton & Joicey Collieries.

He served as High Sheriff of Durham in 1878 and was elected as Member of Parliament (MP) for North Durham at the general election in April 1880, but died in office the following year, aged 64.

He lived at Urpeth Lodge and then Newton Hall, Stocksfield, Northumberland. His daughter and heir married John Packenham Cecil, thereby creating the Joicey-Cecil family.

Parliament of the United Kingdom
Preceded by Charles Palmer and Sir George Elliot	Member of Parliament for North Durham; 1880–1881; With: Charles Palmer	Succeeded by Charles Palmer and Sir George Elliot
