= Palatine Lodge No. 97 =

Craft Masonic Lodge in Sunderland, UK

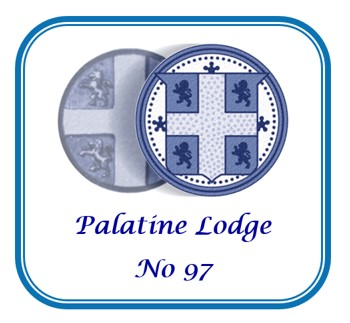
- Formation: 14 January 1757; 269 years ago
- Location: Sunderland
- Coordinates: 54.89973801°N 1.38202235°W
- Parent organization: United Grand Lodge of England
- Website: palatine97.org

Palatine Lodge No. 97 is a Craft Masonic Lodge in Freemasonry under the jurisdiction of the United Grand Lodge of England. The lodge meets at Wearside Masonic Temple, Burdon Road, Sunderland and has done so since 1932. Previously the lodge met at the Masonic Hall in Park Terrace, which was dismantled in 1988, rebuilt and opened in April 2000 at the Beamish Open Air Museum, Stanley, County Durham, England.

== History ==
The lodge is one of the 50 oldest in the UK and was consecrated on 14 January 1757, by John Thornhill, Worshipful Master of Phoenix Lodge No 94, which had been consecrated 14 months previously. The lodge is still in possession of its original warrant, presented at its consecration (1757), by the Marquess of Carnarvon (3rd Duke of Chandos). Palatine's 1757 warrant is the earliest document, still in existence, which can be classed as a warrant. It was the first to be issued by the Premier Grand Lodge, a founding Grand Lodge of the United Grand Lodge of England. It received its centenary warrant in 1864 and the bi-centenary warrant on 14 January 1957. On 11 January 2007 the 250th-anniversary meeting of Palatine Lodge was held at the Wearside Masonic Temple.

The lodge has many antiquities, including a masters, lecturers and other chairs. It is also in possession of many of the original minute, cash and history books dating back to 1763.

== Meeting places ==
Before meeting in purpose-built Masonic buildings, Palatine met in local inns, taverns and even a brother's house.

The meeting places of Palatine Lodge No.97 (from its foundation to the present)
| Year | Venue |
| 1757 | The Marquis of Carnarvon's Head |
| 1766 | The Masons Arms, Low Street |
| 1769 | The Kings Head, High Street |
| 1799 | The Golden Lion Hotel |
| 1803 | The House of Bro Peat, Maudes's Lane |
| 1805 | The Queens Head, Queen Street |
| 1837 | The Kays Inn (The Golden Lion) |
| 1847 | The Bridge Inn, Flag Lane |
| 1860 | The Bridge Hotel, High Street |
| 1870 | The Masonic Hall, Park Terrace |
| 1932 to the present | The Wearside Masonic Temple, Burdon Road |

== Lodge number ==
The United Grand Lodge of England identified Lodges by a number and initially the lodge was given number 218. However, because of its meeting place locally it was known as the Marquis of Carnarvon Lodge No 218. In 1768 its name changed to the Sea Captain's Lodge because members were predominantly Seafarers. Then in 1830 the lodge name changed to Palatine, at the request of the 1st Earl of Durham, John George Lambton, the Provincial Grand Master of Durham. In 1864, after several number changes, it was given Number 97.

== Ritual ==
Before the unification of the Grand Lodges to form the United Grand Lodge of England in 1813, Palatine Lodge was a member of the Premier Grand Lodge (the Moderns) which pre-dated the Antient Grand Lodge (the Antients) by 34 years. In keeping with these traditional roots, the lodge works Old Working of the Craft Ritual, as opposed to the more modern Emulation Working, which has become common in Craft Lodges throughout the English-speaking world. After the unification, the lodge paid considerable attention to the working of the new ritual, then in 1830 instituted a regular Lodge of Instruction and received its warrant, 11 September 1834. The Palatine Lodge of Instruction is one of a handful of warranted Instruction Lodges in the World and although the warrant suffered serious damage, during a fire on 13 November 1914, it remains in the possession of the lodge.

== Masters of Palatine Lodge ==
The lodge records show the names and ranks of every master from the present day back to W Bro William Scollay, the first master, in 1757. Palatine Lodge has produced three provincial grand masters of Durham, Sir Hedworth Williamson, the 7th Baronet, in office from 1841 to 1845, Sir Hedworth Williamson, the 8th Baronet, from 1885 to1900, and RW Ernest Dixon from 1937 to 1959.

== Notable members ==
Throughout the history of the lodge there have been many notable members from numerous diverse backgrounds and professions.

- Bro William Shield (1748-1829), British Composer
- VW Bro Sir Ralph (Noel) Milbanke (1747–1825), British MP, landowner, Provincial Grand Master of the Province of Durham, father-in-law of Lord Byron and grandfather of the Mathematician Lady Ada Lovelace
- Bro James Cawdell (1750-1800), British Comedian and Theatre Impresario
- Bro Sir Robert Peat (1772–1837), British Anglican Cleric
- W Bro James Field Stanfield (1749–1824), Irish Actor, Abolitionist and Author.
- W Bro Rowland Burdon (1757–1838), British MP, Landowner, Patent Holder and Financier of the 1796 Bridge over the River Wear.
- Bro Thomas Wilson (1751-1820), British Engineer, Designer and Patent Holder of the 1796 Bridge over the River Wear.
- W Bro Michael Scarth (1766-1805), British Businessman, Patent Holder and Financier of the 1796 Bridge over the River Wear.
- Bro Philip Laing, (1772-1854), British Shipbuilder, founder of Sir James Laing and Sons.
- Bro William Reid Clanny (1777–1850), Irish Physician and Inventor
- VW Bro John George Lambton (1792–1840), GCB, PC, British MP, Landowner, Governor General and High Commissioner for British North America, Provincial Grand Master of Durham, Northumberland and Deputy Grand Master and Pro-Grand Master of the United Grand Lodge of England.
- VW Bro Sir Hedworth Williamson, 7th Baronet (1797-1861), British MP, Landowner and Provincial Grand Master of Durham.
- W Bro Sir Cuthbert Sharp (1781–1849), British Soldier, Collector of Customs, Writer and Antiquarian.
- Bro Charles Buller, Jnr, (1806-1848), British MP and Barrister
- Bro Benjamin Hawes, (1797-1862), British MP
- VW Bro Sir Hedworth Williamson, 8th Baronet (1827-1900), British MP, Diplomat and Provincial Grand Master of Durham
- Bro John Bowes (1811-1885), British MP, Landowner, Art Collector, Civil Rights Advocate and founder of the Bowes Museum in Barnard Castle, Teesdale
- Bro Sir Edward Temperley Gourley (1826–1902), VD, British MP and Ship Owner
- W Bro Samuel Peter Austin, Jnr, (1843-1925), British Shipbuilder
- W Bro Robert Singleton (1852-1895), British, Cofounder, first treasurer and Captain of Sunderland Association Football Club
- Bro William ‘Willie’ Stewart McFaul (1943-2025), Newcastle United and Northern Irish football goalkeeper and coach
