= Sir Charles Palmer, 1st Baronet =

English shipbuilder

Colonel Sir Charles Palmer Bt MP

Member of Parliament for North Durham
- In office 21 January 1874 – 24 November 1885
- Preceded by: Sir Hedworth Williamson; George Elliot
- Succeeded by: Constituency abolished

Member of Parliament for Jarrow
- In office 24 November 1885 – 3 June 1907
- Preceded by: Constituency created
- Succeeded by: Pete Curran

Personal details
- Born: Charles Mark Palmer; 3 November 1822 South Shields, County Durham, England
- Died: 4 June 1907 (aged 84)
- Party: Liberal Party
- Occupation: Shipbuilder, businessman
- Known for: Founder and owner of Palmers Shipbuilding and Iron Company

Military service
- Allegiance: United Kingdom
- Branch/service: British Army
- Years of service: 1868 - 1888
- Rank: Colonel
- Unit: Royal Engineers
- Commands: 1st Durham Engineer Volunteers

Sir Charles Mark Palmer, 1st Baronet MP (3 November 1822 – 4 June 1907) was an English shipbuilder born in South Shields, County Durham, England. He was also a Liberal Party politician and Member of Parliament. His father, originally the captain of a whaler, moved in 1828 to Newcastle upon Tyne, where he owned a ship owning and ship-broking business.

== Early life ==
At the age of 15 Charles Palmer entered a shipping business in the city. After six months, he travelled to Marseille, France, where his father had procured him a post in a large commercial house, at the same time entrusting him with the local agency of his own business. After two years' experience in Marseilles he entered his father's business in Newcastle, and in 1842 he became a partner.

His business capacity attracted the attention of a leading local colliery owner, and he was appointed manager of the Marley Hill colliery south of Gateshead, in which he became a partner in 1846. Subsequently, he was made one of the managers of the associated collieries north and south of the Tyne owned by Lord Ravensworth, Lord Wharncliffe, the Marquess of Bute and Lord Strathmore.

== Emergence as an entrepreneur ==
Using the profits of the Marley Hill colliery, he gradually purchased the properties of his erstwhile employer, while simultaneously he greatly developed the recently established coke trade, obtaining the coke contracts for several of the large English and continental railways.

In 1865, he purchased the manor of Boulby, including the stately home Grinkle Park, from the Heron and Myddleton family.

== Establishment of Palmer's shipyard ==
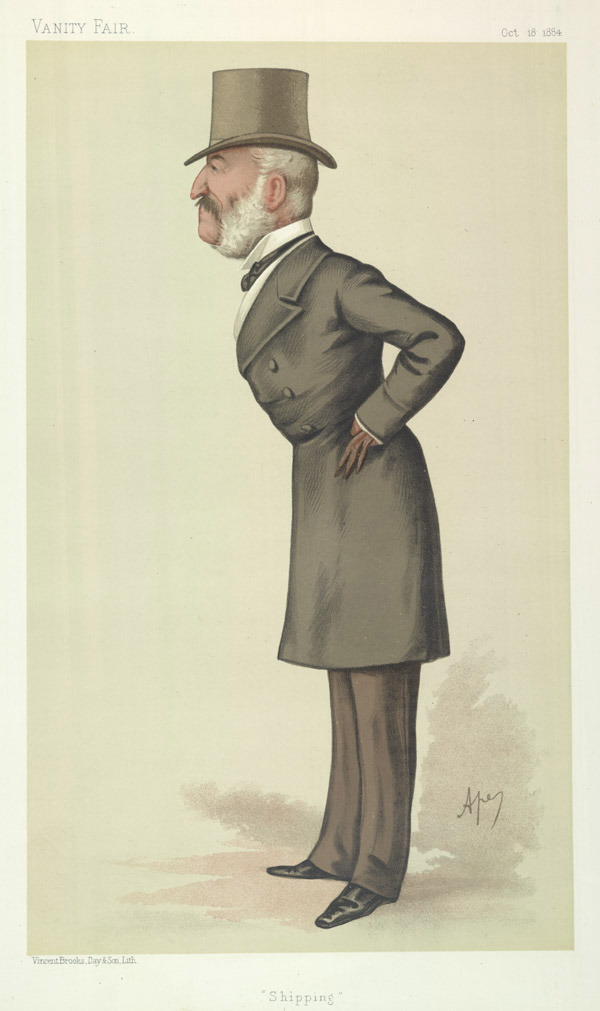
"Shipping". Caricature by Ape published in Vanity Fair in 1884

About 1850 the question of coal-transport to the London market became a serious question for north country colliery proprietors. Palmer therefore built, largely according to his own plans, the John Bowes, the first iron screw collier, and several other steam-colliers, in a yard established by him at Jarrow, then a small Tyneside village.

He then purchased iron mines in Yorkshire and erected large shipbuilding yards along the Tyne at Jarrow, including blast-furnaces, steel-works, rolling-mills and engine works, all on a massive scale. The firm produced warships as well as merchant vessels, and its system of rolling armour plates, introduced in 1856, was generally adopted by other builders.

In 1865 he turned the business into Palmer's Shipbuilding and Iron Company Limited.

== Military career ==
In 1868 Palmer raised a new unit in the Volunteer Force, the 1st Durham Engineer Volunteers at Jarrow, and he was commissioned as Lieutenant-Colonel Commandant. Later, the 1st Durham EV merged with the smaller 1st Newcastle EV as the 1st Newcastle upon Tyne and Durham EV, with Palmer as commanding officer.

Palmer retired from the Volunteers in 1888 with the rank of Colonel. The same year, the 1st Newcastle & Durham was split into three separate units: the 1st Durham Royal Engineers (Volunteers), at Jarrow, and the Tyne Division RE (V), Submarine Miners at North Shields, with Palmer as Honorary Commandant of both units, together with a new 1st Newcastle upon Tyne RE (V). Palmer's younger brother, Alfred Septimus Palmer (1834–1910), a Newcastle mining engineer who had been a major in the 1st Newcastle and Durham, became commanding officer of the third unit.

== Political career ==
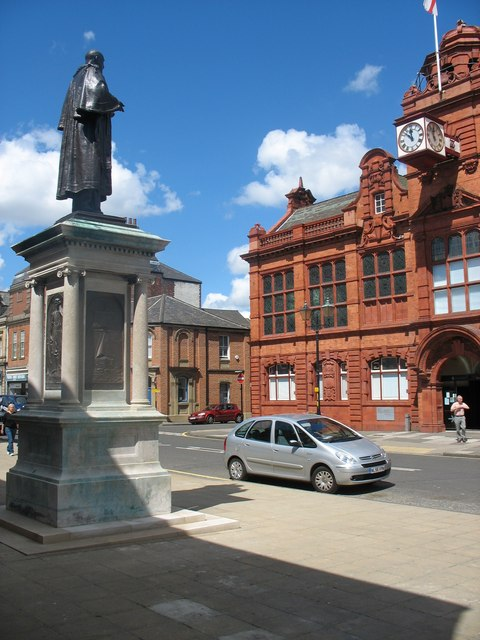
Statue of Charles Palmer, opposite the Jarrow Town Hall

At the 1874 general election, Palmer was elected as Liberal Party Member of Parliament (MP) for North Durham, and held the seat until its abolition for the 1885 general election. He was then elected for the new Jarrow constituency, and sat for the constituency until his death in London in 1907. He had a London home in Grosvenor Square.

He was twice Mayor of Jarrow, in 1875 and again in 1902–03.

Palmer was in 1902 President of the Newcastle and Gateshead Chamber of Commerce (he probably held this position for several years).

== Baronetcy ==
In 1886, Palmer's services in connection with the settlement of the costly dispute between British ship-owners and the Suez Canal Company (of which he was then a director) were rewarded with a baronetcy, as Sir Charles Palmer, 1st Baronet of Grinkle Park, County York.

He was lord of the manor of Hinderwell which was inherited by his widow Gertrude.

== Family ==
Palmer married, firstly, on 29 July 1846, Jane, daughter of Ebenezer Robson of Newcastle. They had two sons:

- George Robson Palmer, later 2nd Baronet (1849–1910)
- Alfred Molyneux Palmer, later 3rd Baronet (1853–1935)

Jane Palmer died on 6 April 1865.

Palmer married, secondly, on 4 July 1867, Augusta Mary, daughter of Alfred Lambert, of Paris and Massa di Carraca, Italy. They had two further sons:

- Lt-Col Claude Bowes Palmer, CBE, Royal Army Medical Corps (Volunteers) (1868–1949)
- Capt Lionel Hugo Palmer, 3rd Bn West Yorkshire Regiment and Royal North-West Mounted Police, Canada (1870–1914)

Augusta Palmer died 2 December 1875.

Palmer married, thirdly, on 17 February 1877, Gertrude, daughter of James Montgomrey of Brentford, Middlesex. They had two children:

- Major Godfrey Mark Palmer, MP for Jarrow (1878–1933)
- Hilda Gertrude Montgomerie Palmer (1884–1946)

Sir Charles Palmer died on 4 June 1907, when he was succeeded in the baronetcy by his eldest son. Gertrude, Lady Palmer, died on 21 January 1918.

== Arms ==
Coat of arms of Sir Charles Palmer, 1st Baronet
Crest In front of a tilting spear erect Proper a wyvern Or resting the dexter foot on a crescent Argent. Escutcheon Sable on a chevron between three crescents in chief and a lion passant in base Argent two tilting spears chevron-wise Proper. Motto Par Sit Fortuna Labori

== Notes ==
Parliament of the United Kingdom
Preceded by Sir Hedworth Williamson; George Elliot	Member of Parliament for North Durham; 1874–1885; With: Lowthian Bell Feb–Jun 1874; George Elliot 1874–1880; John Joicey 1880–1881; George Elliot 1881–1885	Constituency abolished
New constituency	Member of Parliament for Jarrow; 1885–1907	Succeeded by Pete Curran
Baronetage of the United Kingdom
New creation	Baronet (of Grinkle Park and Newcastle upon Tyne); 1886–1907	Succeeded by George Robson Palmer
