= George Vane-Tempest, 5th Marquess of Londonderry =

British aristocrat, businessman, diplomat and Conservative politician

The Most Honourable The Marquess of Londonderry KP
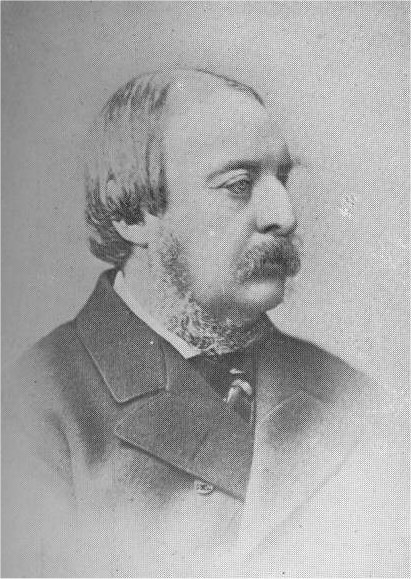
- The Marquess of Londonderry

Lord-Lieutenant of County Durham
- In office 1880–1884
- Monarch: Victoria
- Preceded by: The Earl of Durham
- Succeeded by: The Earl of Durham

Member of the House of Lords (Note: As Earl Vane.)
- Lord Temporal
- In office 6 March 1854 – 6 November 1884
- Preceded by: The 1st Earl Vane
- Succeeded by: The 6th Marquess of Londonderry

Personal details
- Born: George Henry Robert Charles William Vane; 26 April 1821
- Died: 6 November 1884 (aged 63)
- Party: Conservative
- Spouse: Mary Edwards (m. 1846)
- Children: 6, including Charles Vane-Tempest-Stewart, 6th Marquess of Londonderry
- Parent(s): Charles Vane, 3rd Marquess of Londonderry; Lady Frances Vane-Tempest
- Education: Balliol College, Oxford

George Henry Robert Charles William Vane-Tempest, 5th Marquess of Londonderry (26 April 1821 – 6 November 1884), styled Viscount Seaham between 1823 and 1854 and known as The Earl Vane between 1854 and 1872, was a British aristocrat, businessman, diplomat and Conservative politician.

== Background and education ==
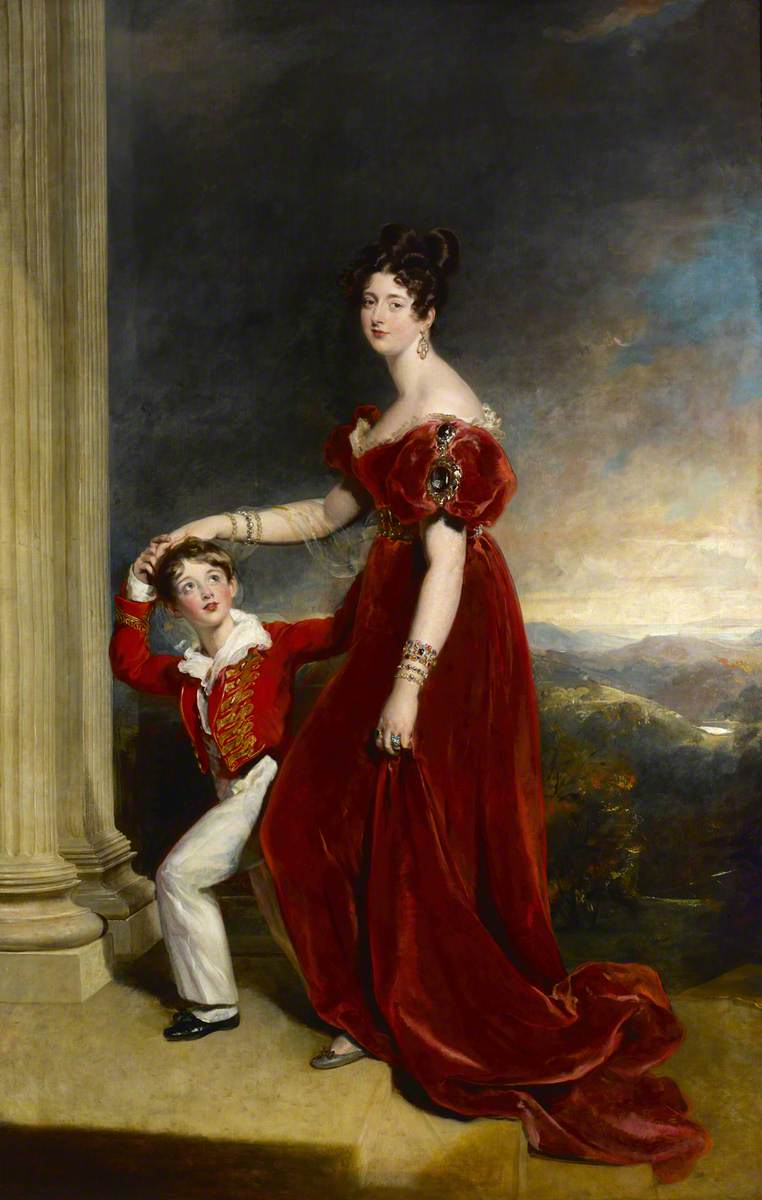
Pictured with his mother Frances Vane, Marchioness of Londonderry, by Thomas Lawrence, 1828.

Born George Vane, he was the second son of Charles Vane, 1st Baron Stewart, but his eldest son by his second wife, the former Lady Frances Vane-Tempest, daughter and heiress of Sir Henry Vane-Tempest, 2nd Baronet. His father, born Charles Stewart, was the second surviving son of Robert Stewart, 1st Marquess of Londonderry, and had changed his surname in 1819 on marrying his second wife. The eldest surviving son of the 1st Marquess, and therefore George's uncle, was the statesman Robert Stewart, Viscount Castlereagh, who had succeeded as 2nd Marquess only 20 days before George's birth.

The 2nd Marquess died the next year, and George's father succeeded as 3rd Marquess; George thereby became Lord George Vane. His half-brother (by his father's first wife, and therefore not affected by the surname change), Frederick Stewart, became Viscount Castlereagh by courtesy; he later succeeded as 4th Marquess.

In 1823, the 3rd Marquess was created Earl Vane and Viscount Seaham, with remainder to his sons by his second wife. As the eldest of those sons, Vane became heir apparent to those peerages, and became Viscount Seaham by courtesy.

Lord Seaham was educated at Eton and Balliol College, Oxford.

== Political and diplomatic career ==
Viscount Seaham entered the 1st Life Guards, purchasing a lieutenancy on 7 February 1845, and retiring on 5 May 1848. He was then appointed a Major in the part-time Montgomeryshire Yeomanry on 15 June 1848.

He was returned to parliament for Durham North in 1847, a seat he held until 1854.

That year he succeeded his father as Earl Vane and entered the House of Lords. In 1867 he was sent on a special mission as Envoy Extraordinary to Russia to Emperor Alexander II, to invest the emperor with the Order of the Garter.

When his half-brother, Frederick Stewart, 4th Marquess of Londonderry, died childless in 1872, Earl Vane inherited the marquessate and family estates. Two years later, he was appointed a Knight of the Order of St Patrick. In 1880, he became Lord-Lieutenant of County Durham, a post he held until his death four years later.

He was appointed Lieutenant-Colonel Commandant of the 2nd (Seaham) Durham Artillery Volunteer Corps on 26 March 1864. This was a part-time unit largely recruited from his family's Seaham Colliery, and his younger brother and later two of his sons also became officers in the unit. The Marquess of Londonderry was succeeded in the command in 1876 by his eldest son.

== Business interests ==
Lord Londonderry managed his father-in-law's estates (see below), which included some of the slate quarries around Corris, Gwynedd, Wales. He was one of the original promoters of the Corris Railway, created to carry the slate from the quarries to the markets. He the chairman of the Newtown and Machynlleth Railway, formed in 1857. and joined the board of the Cambrian Railways, latterly as chairman. He owned lead mines at Van near Llanidloes and was a supporter of the Van Railway, which connected the mines to the Cambrian Railways mainline at Caersws.

He owned 50,000 acres with most of his holdings in Durham and County Down.

== Family ==
Lord Londonderry married Mary Cornelia Edwards, daughter of Sir John Edwards, 1st Baronet, on 3 August 1846. They set up home at Plas Machynlleth, the Edwards family seat, and had six children:

- Lady Frances Cornelia Harriet Vane-Tempest (c. 1851 – 2 March 1872)
- Charles Vane-Tempest-Stewart, 6th Marquess of Londonderry (1852–1915)
- Lord Henry John Vane-Tempest (1 July 1854 – 28 January 1905)
- Lady Avarina Mary Vane-Tempest (c. 1858 – 26 June 1873)
- Lord Herbert Lionel Henry Vane-Tempest (6 July 1862 – 26 January 1921), chairman of the Cambrian Railways, killed in the Abermule train collision
- Lady Alexandrina Louise Maud Vane-Tempest (8 November 1863 – 31 July 1945), married Wentworth Beaumont, 1st Viscount Allendale

Lord Londonderry died in November 1884, aged 63. He was succeeded by his eldest son, Charles.

The Dowager Marchioness of Londonderry, as she became upon her husband's death, remained in residence at Plas Machynlleth, where she entertained Alexandra, Princess of Wales, in 1897. The Dowager Marchioness died in September 1906.

The 6th Marquess left Machynlleth on succeeding to the marquessate, but Lord Herbert remained resident at the Plas. He also served as Chairman of the Cambrian Railways, until he was killed in the Abermule train collision. In August 1945, the 7th Marquess of Londonderry gave the vacant Plas and grounds to the townspeople.

Lady Frances Vane (1822–1899), sister of the 5th Marquess, married The 7th Duke of Marlborough. She was the mother of Lord Randolph Churchill and grandmother of Winston Churchill. On Lord Herbert's death without issue, a trust set up by his grandmother Frances passed to Winston Churchill, who was his first cousin once removed. This enabled Churchill to purchase Chartwell.

== Ancestry ==
Ancestors of George Vane-Tempest, 5th Marquess of Londonderry

16. Colonel William Stewart, of Ballylawn
8. Alexander Stewart, of Mount Stewart
17. Frances Stewart
4. Robert Stewart, 1st Marquess of Londonderry
18. John Cowan
9. Mary Cowan
19. Anne Stewart
2. Charles Vane, 3rd Marquess of Londonderry
20. Sir John Pratt
10. Charles Pratt, 1st Earl Camden
21. Elizabeth Wilson
5. Lady Frances Pratt
22. Nicholas Jeffreys
11. Elizabeth Jeffreys
1. George Vane-Tempest, 5th Marquess of Londonderry
24. George Vane
12. Sir Henry Vane, 1st Baronet
25. Anne Machon
6. Sir Henry Vane-Tempest, 2nd Baronet
26. John Tempest, MP
13. Frances Tempest
27. Frances Shuttleworth
3. Lady Frances Vane-Tempest
28. Alexander MacDonnell, 5th Earl of Antrim
14. Randal William MacDonnell, 1st Marquess of Antrim
29. Anne Plunkett
7. Anne MacDonnell, 2nd Countess of Antrim
30. Hervey Morres, 1st Viscount Mountmorres
15. The Hon. Letitia Morres
31. Lady Letitia Ponsonby

== Notes ==
Parliament of the United Kingdom
Preceded by Hedworth Lambton; Hon. Henry Liddell	Member of Parliament for North Durham; 1847–1854; With: Robert Duncombe Shafto	Succeeded by Robert Duncombe Shafto; Lord Adolphus Vane-Tempest
Honorary titles
Preceded by The Earl of Durham	Lord Lieutenant of Durham; 1880–1884	Succeeded by The Earl of Durham
Peerage of the United Kingdom
Preceded by Charles Vane	Earl Vane; 1854–1884; Member of the House of Lords (1854–1884)	Succeeded by Charles Vane-Tempest-Stewart
Peerage of Ireland
Preceded by Frederick Stewart	Marquess of Londonderry; 1872–1884	Succeeded by Charles Vane-Tempest-Stewart
