= Robert Duncombe Shafto =

British politician

Robert Duncombe Shafto (1806 – 22 March 1889) was a British Liberal Party politician. He was Member of Parliament (MP) for North Durham from 1847 to 1868.

Parliament of the United Kingdom
Preceded by Henry Liddell and Hedworth Lambton	Member of Parliament for North Durham; 1847 – 1868; With: The Viscount Seaham, 1847–1854; Lord Adolphus Vane-Tempest, 1854–1864; Sir Hedworth Williamson, 1864–1874	Succeeded by George Elliot and Sir Hedworth Williamson, 8th Bt.
