= Lord Adolphus Vane-Tempest =

British politician

Lord Adolphus Frederick Charles William Vane-Tempest (2 July 1825 – 11 June 1864), known until 1854 as Lord Adolphus Vane, was a Conservative Party politician in the United Kingdom.

He was the fourth child (and second son) of Charles Vane, 3rd Marquess of Londonderry and his wife Frances Vane, Marchioness of Londonderry.

In December 1852, he was elected at a by-election as Member of Parliament (MP) for the City of Durham, but the election was overturned on petition the next year.

In 1854 he was elected unopposed to the House of Commons as MP for North Durham after the death of his father, filling the seat vacated by his elder brother George Vane-Tempest, Viscount Seaham, who succeeded to the peerage as Earl Vane. He held the seat until his death in 1864, aged 38.

During the enthusiasm for the Volunteer Movement in 1859–60, although his brothers were connected with the 2nd (Seaham) Durham Artillery Volunteer Corps formed at the family's Seaham Colliery, Lord Adolphus raised and commanded an infantry corps, the Sunderland Rifles.

According to Anne Isba, author and Victorian Studies scholar, Vane was "notoriously unstable" and was "described by Queen Victoria as having 'a natural tendency to madness'. Vane, who on one occasion violently attacked his wife and infant son, died four years later during a struggle with four keepers".

He had one son, Adolphus Vane-Tempest, born 4 January 1863.

== Ancestry ==
Ancestors of Lord Adolphus Vane-Tempest

16. Colonel William Stewart, of Ballylawn
8. Alexander Stewart, of Mount Stewart
17. Frances Stewart
4. Robert Stewart, 1st Marquess of Londonderry
18. John Cowan
9. Mary Cowan
19. Anne Stewart
2. Charles Vane, 3rd Marquess of Londonderry
20. Sir John Pratt
10. Charles Pratt, 1st Earl Camden
21. Elizabeth Wilson
5. Lady Frances Pratt
22. Nicholas Jeffreys
11. Elizabeth Jeffreys
1. Lord Adolphus Vane-Tempest
24. George Vane
12. Sir Henry Vane, 1st Baronet
25. Anne Machon
6. Sir Henry Vane-Tempest, 2nd Baronet
26. John Tempest, MP
13. Frances Tempest
27. Frances Shuttleworth
3. Lady Frances Vane-Tempest
28. Alexander MacDonnell, 5th Earl of Antrim
14. Randal William MacDonnell, 1st Marquess of Antrim
29. Anne Plunkett
7. Anne MacDonnell, 2nd Countess of Antrim
30. Hervey Morres, 1st Viscount Mountmorres
15. The Hon. Letitia Morres
31. Lady Letitia Ponsonby

Parliament of the United Kingdom
Preceded by William Atherton; Thomas Colpitts Granger	Member of Parliament for City of Durham; 1852–1853; With: William Atherton	Succeeded by William Atherton; John Mowbray
Preceded by Robert Duncombe Shafto; George Vane-Tempest, Viscount Seaham	Member of Parliament for North Durham; 1854–1864; With: Robert Duncombe Shafto	Succeeded by Robert Duncombe Shafto; Sir Hedworth Williamson
