= Robert Ord =

British lawyer and politician

Robert Ord FRS (1700 – 12 February 1778) was a British lawyer and politician.

== Life ==
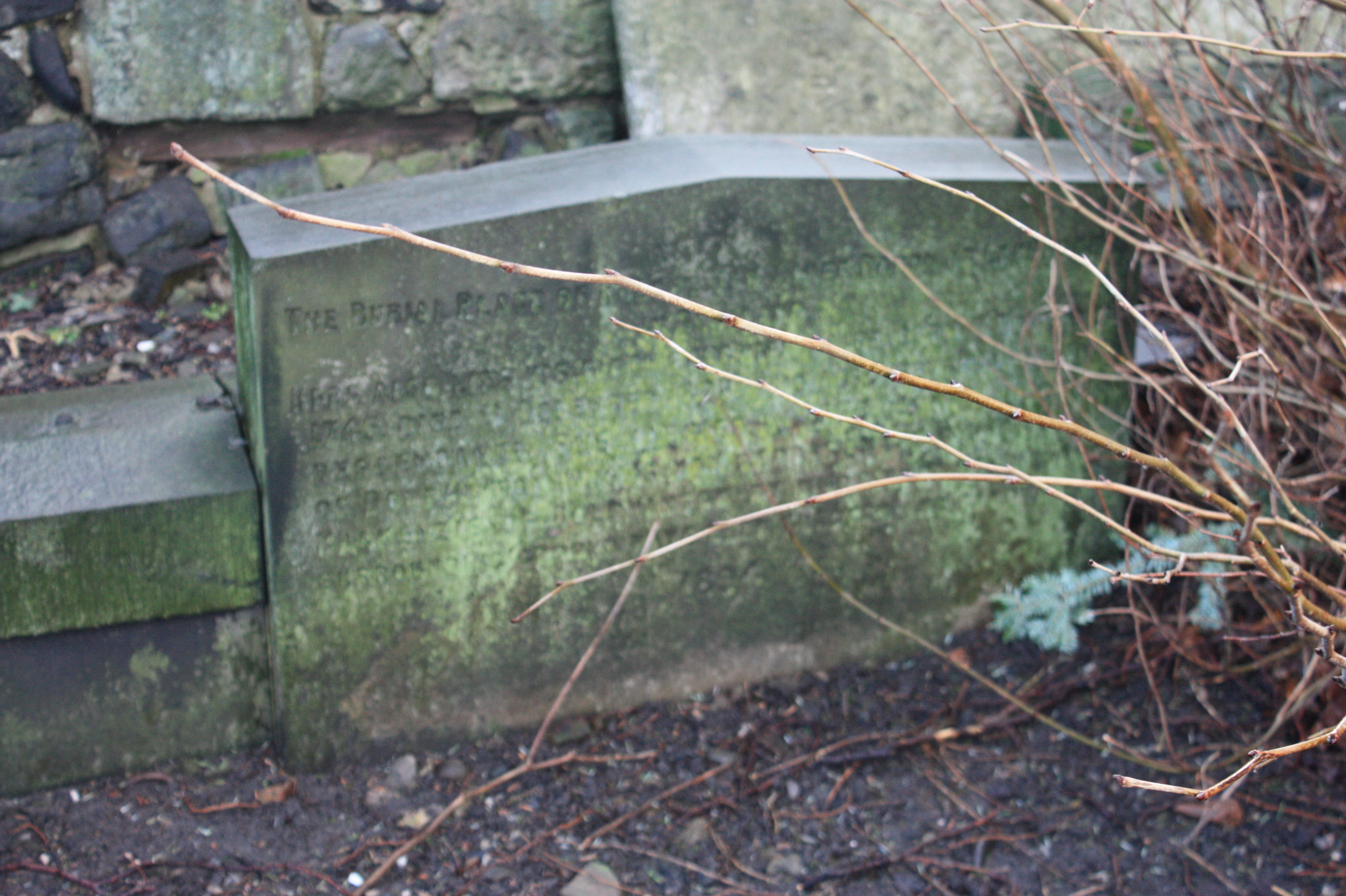
The grave of Robert Ord, Restalrig, Edinburgh

Ord studied law at Lincoln's Inn in London from 1718, and was called to the bar in 1724. In 1723 he was elected a Fellow of the Royal Society of London. He inherited the estates of Hunstanworth Manor and Newbiggin Hall upon the death of his elder brother Ralph Ord.

He was a Member of Parliament (MP) for Mitchell, Cornwall, from 1734 to 1741 and for Morpeth, Northumberland, from 1741 to 1755.

He was Secretary to the Chancellor of the Exchequer (1742–43), Deputy Cofferer of the Household (1743–44), Chief Baron of the Scottish Exchequer (1755–75) and Chancellor of the Diocese of Durham (1753–64).

He was Rector of Glasgow University 1767/8.

Ord died aged 77. He is buried in Restalrig Churchyard in Edinburgh. His modest gravestone dates from the 19th century and describes him as Baron of the Exchequer for Scotland.

== Family ==
Ord married Mary, daughter of Sir John Darnell, Kt. They had one son, John Ord, and five daughters. The fifth daughter, Alice (1745–1826) married John Mackenzie of Dolphinton. Margaret died on Princes Street in 1806. Both are buried in Restalrig.

His daughter Elizabeth Ord (1742–1820) married Robert McQueen, Lord Braxfield and is also buried in Restalrig.

His daughter Nancy Ord infamously placed a placard on the house of David Hume on the south-west corner of St Andrew Square reading "St David Street". Although St David is a Welsh rather than Scottish saint, the city was amused by the idea and the name stuck.

== Arms ==
Coat of arms of Robert Ord
Crest An elk’s head erased Proper. Escutcheon Sable three salmon haurient Argent.

Parliament of Great Britain
Preceded by Henry Kelsall; Thomas Farrington	Member of Parliament for Mitchell; 1734–1741; With: Thomas Watts	Succeeded by John Ord; Edward Clive
Preceded by Henry Furnese; Sir Henry Liddell	Member of Parliament for Morpeth; 1741–1755; With: Sir Henry Liddell to 1747; Viscount Limerick 1747–54; Thomas Duncombe from 1754	Succeeded by Sir Matthew Fetherstonhaugh; Thomas Duncombe
