= Sir George Elliot, 1st Baronet =

British mining engineer (1814–1893)

Sir George Elliot 1st Baronet, MP, JP
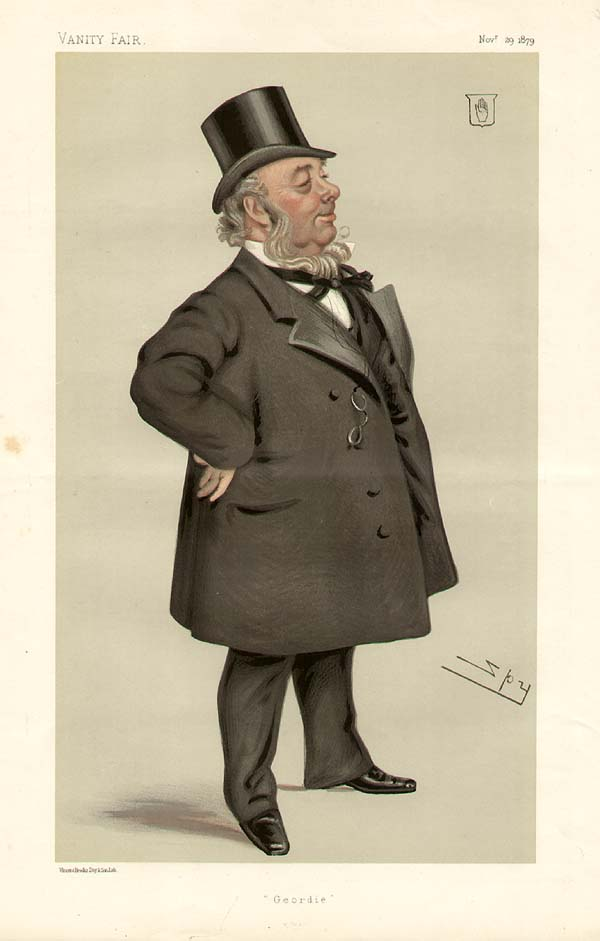
- "Geordie": Elliot as caricatured by Spy (Leslie Ward) in Vanity Fair, November 1879
- Born: 18 March 1814; Gateshead, England
- Died: 23 December 1893 (aged 79)
- Resting place: Houghton Hillside Cemetery
- Occupations: Businessman; Member of Parliament
- Organization: Conservative Party
- Known for: Philanthropy
- Children: Sir George Elliot, 2nd Baronet, MP

Sir George Elliot, 1st Baronet, JP (18 March 1814 – 23 December 1893) was a mining engineer and self-made businessman from Gateshead in North East England. A colliery labourer who went on to own several coal mines, he later bought a wire rope manufacturing company which manufactured the first Transatlantic telegraph cable. He was also a Conservative Party Member of Parliament (MP).

== Early life ==
George Elliot - often known in the Durham coalfield as Bonnie Geordie - was born in Gateshead, County Durham, on 18 March 1814, the eldest son of Ralph Elliot, a coal miner and Elizabeth, daughter of Henry Braithwaite, of Newcastle upon Tyne.

== Mining career ==
At the age of 9, living in Shiney Row, he was a trapper boy at Whitefield Pit at Penshaw where underground he would open the doors when the miners came along with the tubs. He used a quarter of his wages here to fund evening classes. In 1831 he was a union leader in a strike over the length of the working day. and in about 1832 he was apprenticed to Thomas Sopwith, a leading Tyneside mining engineer and land surveyor, and was involved in investigating coal resources in the Forest of Dean and surveying the line of the Great North of England Railway between Darlington and York. In 1837 he returned to Whitefield as overman and in 1841 became under-manager at Monkwearmouth pit, and then manager in 1844 at the age of 30. In the mid-1840s he became a managing partner in Washington colliery and in 1845 opened the Usworth mine. In 1848 he was appointed viewer to Lord Londonderry with responsibilities for collieries, railways and harbours - notably the development of Seaham Harbour - and in 1850 bought the Whitfield mine from him.

In the 1860s he acquired further mines in North Wales, Staffordshire, and in Nova Scotia and then in 1863 formed a partnership which bought for £365,000 all the South Wales coal mines of the late Thomas Powell. He then established the Powell Duffryn Steam Coal Co (PDSC) which grew to be the largest coal company in South Wales. He was acting manager of the company until 1877 and extended the business, buying coal mines near Aberdare including the rich coal mine and ironworks of Crawshay Bailey. In 1873, with William Hunter of Sandhoe, he opened Kimblesworth Colliery near Durham.

Elliot was keen to try new mining technologies and was an advocate of improved safety lamps, shaft detaching hooks, and coal-cutting machinery. He held trials on new methods of ventilation and made a major contribution to methods of mining coal simultaneously in adjacent seams. He was closely involved with professional activities in mining, being a founder member of the North of England Institute of Mining and Mechanical Engineers, a member of its council for many years and President in 1868–9. His inaugural address in November 1868 suggested that the various regional mining institutions should amalgamate to increase appreciation of the profession and to affiliate with the Institution of Civil Engineers to improve professional recognition. He was also a member of other professional engineering institutions and unlike some owners he supported the establishment of the Mines Inspectorate in the 1850s. He appeared as an expert witness before several government inquiries, and served on the Royal Commission on the coal industry that reported in 1871 and the Royal Commission on Accidents in Mines that reported in 1886.

Shortly before his death in 1893 he proposed the amalgamation of collieries into a massive semi-public enterprise monitored by the Board of Trade, which would control output, fix prices, pay fair wages, and establish a miners' welfare fund.

== Business activities ==
In 1849 he bought Kuper & Co, a London maker of telegraph cables and wire ropes used in mines and formed a partnership with Richard Atwood Glass as Glass, Elliot and Co. In 1864 this was amalgamated with the Gutta Percha Company to form the Telegraph Construction and Maintenance Company (based at Enderby's Wharf in Greenwich, southeast London), and it was this concern that laid the first permanent transatlantic telegraph cable in 1866. A new company, George Elliot and Co, was set up to take over the manufacture of wire rope at new works in Newcastle and Cardiff.

He supported the development of Newport Docks as an alternative to Cardiff - the Alexandra northern dock in Newport was opened in 1875 - and was one of the promoters of the Pontypridd, Caerphilly and Newport Railway, to give a direct route from collieries to the Alexandra Dock.

== Political career ==
At the 1868 general election, Elliot was elected Member of Parliament for North Durham. In 1873, with William Hunter of Sandhoe, he opened Kimblesworth Colliery. He lost his seat at Durham at the 1874 general election but regained it later in the year. He was created a baronet on 15 May 1874 in recognition of his work for public services. He advised Benjamin Disraeli to invest in the Suez Canal, which provided a faster shipping route to India. He was a financial adviser to the Egyptian Khedive (the viceroy under the Ottomans), and also received an honour from the King of Portugal – the grand cross of the military order of Our Lady of Villa Viciosa. As an MP made arrangements for the new tongue of Big Ben, in Westminster, London, to be forged at Hopper's Iron Foundry in Houghton-le-Spring.

In 1880 Elliot lost his seat at North Durham but regained it in a by-election in 1881. In 1885 the North Durham constituency was reorganised under the Redistribution of Seats Act 1885 and at the 1886 general election Elliot was elected MP for Monmouth Boroughs. He held the seat until 1892.

== George Hudson ==
When the Railway King George Hudson was arrested for his debts in 1865 and imprisoned in York Prison it was Elliot who paid off the debt to enable his release. Elliot and Hugh Taylor (MP) were both friends of Hudson so when by 1871 he was deeply in debt, in bad health and living in exile they started a subscription fund which they launched with a donation of 100 Guineas each. When this closed it was converted into a trust fund (legally protected from Hudson's creditors) and provided Hudson with an income.

== Personal life ==
George Elliot married Margaret Green of Rainton, Durham, in 1836, and they had two sons and four daughters. Margaret died in 1880, and he never remarried, but he was involved in a well-publicized breach of promise case ten years later when he was sued by Emily Mary Hairs, a professional singer, for £5000 damages, but her claim was rejected by a jury.

In 1874/5 he was president of Durham University Society and in 1876 he was Provincial Grand Master of the Freemasons in South Wales.

Elliot was keen on having memorials to his family. In 1877 he donated the 130-foot tall tower and spire of St Mary's Church, West Rainton, in memory of his daughter, Elizabeth, and in 1878 erected a stone tomb in the churchyard of All Saints' Church, Penshaw to his father, mother and brothers and also to his son Ralph Elliot who had died in 1873 aged 35 at the Cape of Good Hope. In 1889 he donated a stained glass window of the Baptism, Resurrection and Ascension to the same church. In 1882 he purchased land in Aberaman in South Wales as a gift in memory of his wife and daughter Elizabeth. Work then commenced on the construction of St Margaret's Church and it was completed in 1883.

Elliot owned substantial estates in Monmouthshire and at Whitby, where in the 1870s he further developed the West Cliff area and had a house called "The Crescent" built. Elliot was visited at his residence at the Royal Crescent in Whitby by Bram Stoker. Elliot owned an Egyptian princess mummy which may have inspired Stoker to write the horror novel The Jewel of Seven Stars (1903).

Elliot established the Elliot Home for Seamen, in Temple Street, Newport, Monmouthshire in 1886 managed by the Mission to Seamen charity. In 1889 he donated the stained glass window of the Baptism, Resurrection and Ascension to All Saints' Church, Penshaw, in memory of his brothers and son.

Sir George Elliot died at his house, 17 Portland Place, London, on 23 December 1893. The obituary in The Times claimed 'the public loses in him a man who had the capacity to place himself at the head of important movements and the energy and industry to continue to direct them with success during a lifetime which has lasted for nearly 80 years.'

His second son, George William Elliot, then MP for Richmond, Yorkshire, succeeded to the baronetcy.

== Sources ==
- George Elliot Grace’s guide to British industrial history. Accessed 18 June 2016
- Griffin, C. Elliot, Sir George, first baronet (1814–1893), Oxford Dictionary of National Biography, Oxford University Press, 2004. Accessed 12 June 2016. (Available online on subscription and through public libraries.)
- History of the Atlantic Cable & Undersea Communications
- Lanagan, Paul; (2004). Houghton Hillside Cemetery Guide Book & Map, Houghton-le-Spring. ISBN 978-0-9543253-5-0
- Obituary: Sir George Elliot The Times 25 December 1893, 4
- Obituary: Sir George Elliot Minutes of Proceedings, Institution of Civil Engineers v116 1894, 355-357
- Sir George Elliot Engineer 29 December 1893, 617
- Sir George Elliot Bart, MP Houghton Heritage. Accessed 18 June 2016.
- Rushford, Frank H; (1950). Houghton-le-Spring: a History, Durham

Parliament of the United Kingdom
Preceded by Robert Duncombe Shafto and Sir Hedworth Williamson, Bt.	Member of Parliament for North Durham; 1868 – 1874; With: Hedworth Williamson	Succeeded by Lowthian Bell and Charles Palmer
Preceded by Lowthian Bell and Charles Palmer	Member of Parliament for North Durham; 1874 – 1880; With: Charles Palmer	Succeeded by Charles Palmer and John Joicey
Preceded by Charles Palmer and John Joicey	Member of Parliament for North Durham; 1881–1885; With: Charles Palmer	constituency abolished
Preceded by Edward Carbutt	Member of Parliament for Monmouth Boroughs; 1886 – 1892	Succeeded by Albert Spicer
Baronetage of the United Kingdom
New creation	Baronet (of Penshaw, Durham); 1874–1893	Succeeded by George Elliot
