= Eslington Park =

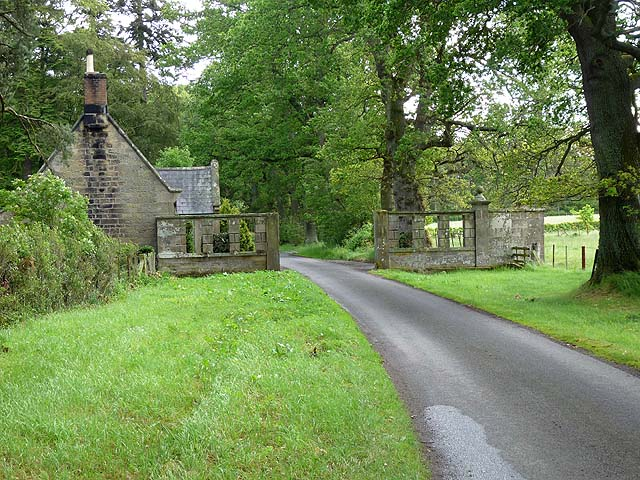
- East Lodge, Eslington Park

- Location in Northumberland

General information
- Location: Northumberland, England, UK
- Coordinates: 55.402°N 1.939°W
- OS grid: NU039119

Eslington Park is a privately owned 18th-century mansion house west of Whittingham, Northumberland, near the River Aln. It is the family seat of Lord Ravensworth. It is a Grade II* listed building.

Eslington, first mentioned in the reign of Edward III in 1335, was held in early times by a family who took that name. It later passed into the hands of the Hazelriggs, the Herons, and then the Collingwood's, who lost all when George, the head of the family, was executed for treason in 1716. The Liddells purchased the Eslington estates from the Crown, and the head of the family, Lord Ravensworth, became the chief landowner.

There was a tower house at Eslington in 1415 in the ownership of Thomas Hesilrige. A survey of 1541 reported that the house, in the ownership of Hesilrige but occupied by Robert Collingwood, was in 'good reparation'. George Collingwood was attainted for his treasonable part in the Jacobite rising of 1715. His estate at Eslington was sequestered and sold by the Crown to George Liddell, great uncle of Thomas Henry Liddell, 1st Baron Ravensworth. Liddell built a new two-storey nine-bay mansion house on the site in about 1720, which was extended in 1796.

George's grandson Cuthbert Collingwood, 1st Baron Collingwood (not born until 1748 would go onto become a loyal Hanoverian admiral).
