= Williamson baronets =

Set index for Williamson baronets

There have been two baronetcies created for persons with the surname Williamson, one in the Baronetage of England and one in the Baronetage of the United Kingdom. As of 2026 one is extant.

- Williamson baronets of East Markham (1642)
- Williamson baronets of Glenogil (1909): see Baron Forres
