= Thomas Liddell, 1st Baron Ravensworth =

British peer and Tory politician

The Right Honourable The Baron Ravensworth
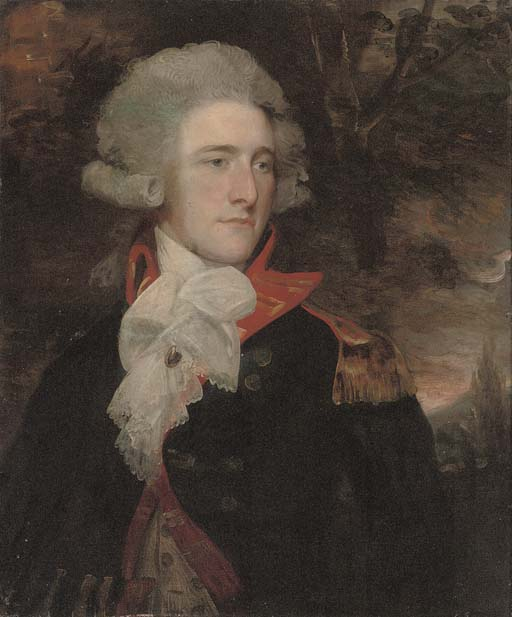

Member of Parliament for County Durham
- In office 1806–1807
- Preceded by: Rowland Burdon; Sir Ralph Milbanke, Bt
- Succeeded by: Sir Ralph Milbanke, Bt; Sir Henry Vane-Tempest, Bt

Personal details
- Born: 8 February 1775
- Died: 7 March 1855 (aged 80)
- Party: Tory
- Spouse: Maria Susannah Simpson (m. 1796; died 1845)
- Relations: Henry Liddell (nephew)
- Children: 12
- Parent(s): Sir Henry Liddell, 5th Baronet; Elizabeth Steele

Thomas Henry Liddell, 1st Baron Ravensworth (8 February 1775 – 7 March 1855), known as Sir Thomas Liddell, 6th Baronet, from 1791 to 1821, was a British peer and Tory politician.

== Early life ==
Liddell was the son of Sir Henry Liddell, 5th Baronet, and his wife Elizabeth Steele, a daughter of Thomas Steele of Hampsnett. His younger brother Henry Liddell, Rector of Easington (1787–1872), was the father of a younger Henry Liddell, co-author (with Robert Scott) of the monumental work A Greek-English Lexicon, and father of the Alice who inspired Alice in Wonderland.

== Career ==
He succeeded his father in the baronetcy and to the family estates at Ravensworth Castle and Eslington Park and to extensive coal mining interests in 1791. He was High Sheriff of Northumberland in 1804 and served as Tory Member of Parliament for County Durham between 1806 and 1807. On 17 July 1821 he was raised to the peerage as Baron Ravensworth, of Ravensworth Castle in the County Palatine of Durham and of Eslington Park in the County of Northumberland.

At Ravensworth, he demolished the old 1724 house in 1808 and replaced it with a substantial mansion in the Gothic style designed by architect John Nash. He also employed George Stephenson from 1804 at his Killingworth colliery and encouraged and financed him in the development of steam power which was vital for the improvement of the efficiency of the wagonways which transported coal from the pit to the River Tyne.

== Personal life ==
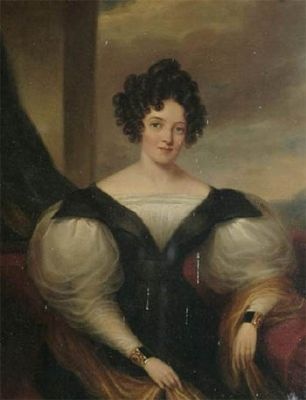
Maria, Baroness Ravensworth

On 26 March 1796, Thomas married Maria Susannah Simpson (1773–1845). She was a daughter of John Simpson, of Bradley Hall, Co. Durham, and Lady Anne Lyon. Her maternal grandparents were Thomas Lyon, 8th Earl of Strathmore and Kinghorne and Jean Nicholsen. Together, they had twelve children:

- Henry Thomas Liddell, 1st Earl of Ravensworth (1797–1878).
- Maria Liddell (1798–1882), who married Constantine Phipps, 1st Marquess of Normanby.
- Thomas Liddell (1800–1856), who married Caroline Elizabeth Barrington, daughter of George Barrington, 5th Viscount Barrington.
- Anne Elizabeth Liddell (1801–1878), who married Sir Hedworth Williamson, 7th Baronet.
- Jane Elizabeth Liddell (1804–1883), who married William Keppel Barrington, 6th Viscount Barrington.
- Elizabeth Charlotte Liddell (1807–1890), who married Edward Ernest Villiers, a son of George Villiers and grandson of Thomas Villiers, 1st Earl of Clarendon. Their daughter Edith Villiers married Robert Bulwer-Lytton, 1st Earl of Lytton.
- Robert Liddell (1808–1888), who married Emily Ann Charlotte Wellesley, a daughter of Gerald Wellesley and granddaughter of Garret Wesley, 1st Earl of Mornington.
- Susan Liddell (1810–1886), who married Charles Yorke, 4th Earl of Hardwicke.
- George Augustus Frederick Liddell (1812–1888), who married Cecil Elizabeth Jane Wellesley, another daughter of Gerald Wellesley and granddaughter of Garret Wesley, 1st Earl of Mornington.
- Charlotte Amelia Liddell (1814–1883), who married Captain John Trotter (2nd Lifeguards) of Dyrham Park and had issue.
- Sir Adolphus Frederick Octavious Liddell (1818–1885), who married Frederica Elizabeth Lane-Fox, daughter of George Lane-Fox and Georgiana Henrietta Buckley. Georgiana was a granddaughter of John West, 2nd Earl De La Warr.
- Georgiana Liddell (1822–1905), who married John Arthur Douglas Bloomfield, 2nd Baron Bloomfield.

Lady Ravensworth was the sister of Frances, Lady Paul, wife of Sir John Dean Paul, 1st Baronet, she was the niece of the Baroness Bradford as well as cousin of Lt Gen Sir Frederick Lester.

He died in March 1855, aged 80, and was succeeded in his titles by his son Henry, who was created Earl of Ravensworth in 1874.

== In popular media ==
Liddell was portrayed as the character of Lord Ravensworth by actor Terence Alexander in the 1985 Doctor Who serial The Mark of the Rani.

== Arms ==
Coat of arms of Thomas Liddell, 1st Baron Ravensworth
Coronet That of a baron. Crest A lion rampant sable, billetée and crowned with an eastern crown or. Escutcheon Argent, fretty gules, on a chief gules three leopards' faces or. Supporters Two leopards or, semée of golps, and gorged with mural crowns purpure. Motto Fama semper vivit (Fame lives always), and unus et idem (One and the same).

Parliament of the United Kingdom
Preceded by Rowland Burdon; Sir Ralph Milbanke, Bt	Member of Parliament for County Durham; 1806–1807; With: Sir Ralph Milbanke, Bt	Succeeded by Sir Ralph Milbanke, Bt; Sir Henry Vane-Tempest, Bt
Peerage of the United Kingdom
New title	Baron Ravensworth; 1821–1855	Succeeded by Henry Liddell
Baronetage of England
Preceded by Henry Liddell	Baronet (of Ravensworth Castle); 1791–1855	Succeeded by Henry Liddell
