= Baron Ravensworth =

Barony in the Peerage of Great Britain

Baron Ravensworth, of Ravensworth Castle in the County Palatine of Durham and of Eslington Park in the County of Northumberland, is a title in the Peerage of the United Kingdom.

It was created in 1821 for Sir Thomas Liddell, 6th Baronet. The title of Baron Ravensworth had previously been created in the Peerage of Great Britain in 1747 for the fourth Baronet, but this had become extinct in 1784. The second Baron of this second creation was made Earl of Ravensworth and Baron Eslington, but these titles also became extinct in 1904.

== Liddell family ==
Family history

The Liddell family descends from Thomas Liddell, a wealthy merchant of Newcastle-upon-Tyne and supporter of Charles I. In 1642 he was created a Baronet, of Ravensworth Castle, in the Baronetage of England. His grandson, the third Baronet, represented Durham and Newcastle-upon-Tyne in the House of Commons. In 1720 he acquired the estate of Eslington Park. His grandson, the fourth Baronet, sat as Member of Parliament for Morpeth. In 1747 he was created Baron Ravensworth, of Ravensworth Castle in the County Palatine of Durham, in the Peerage of Great Britain. However, this title became extinct on his death when he was succeeded in the baronetcy by his nephew, the fifth Baronet.

Overview of the Barony

The latter's son, the sixth Baronet, represented County Durham in the House of Commons. In 1821 the barony of Ravensworth was revived when he was created Baron Ravensworth, of Ravensworth Castle in the County Palatine of Durham and of Eslington Park in the County of Northumberland, in the Peerage of the United Kingdom. His son, the second Baron, was Conservative Member of Parliament for Northumberland, North Durham and Liverpool. In 1874 he was created Baron Eslington, of Eslington Park in the County of Northumberland, and Earl of Ravensworth, of Ravensworth Castle in the County Palatine of Durham. These titles were in the Peerage of the United Kingdom. His eldest son, the second Earl, represented Northumberland South in Parliament as a Conservative. He was succeeded by his younger brother, the third Earl. On his death in 1904 both the barony of Eslington and the earldom became extinct. However, he was succeeded in the barony of Ravensworth and baronetcy by his first cousin, the fifth Baron. He was the son of Robert Liddell, fifth son of the first Baron. As of 2010 the titles are held by his great-grandson, the ninth Baron, who succeeded his father in 2004.

Other family members

Three other members of the Liddell family may also be mentioned:

- Henry Liddell, son of Henry Liddell, younger son of the fifth Baronet, was Vice-Chancellor of Oxford University.
- Alice Liddell, daughter of Henry Liddell, the Vice-Chancellor, was the eponymous subject of Alice's Adventures in Wonderland by Lewis Carroll.
- Guy Liddell, grandson of George Liddell, younger son of the first Baron of the second creation, was the wartime head of counter-espionage in Britain's MI5.

Family seat

The main seat for the family was originally at Ravensworth Castle, in Gateshead, Tyne and Wear. This great stately home was almost completely demolished in the 1920s due to subsidence, ironically caused by the family's own coal mines, the profits of which had paid for its construction. The castle's stables, which survive in a ruinous state, were featured in the Restoration (television) programme on the BBC in 2003.

The family's present seat is the remaining residence at Eslington Park, near Alnwick in Northumberland.

== Liddell baronets, of Ravensworth Castle (1642) ==
- Sir Thomas Liddell, 1st Baronet (d. 1650)
- Sir Thomas Liddell, 2nd Baronet (d. 1697)
- Sir Henry Liddell, 3rd Baronet (c. 1644–1723)
- Sir Henry Liddell, 4th Baronet (1708–1784) (created Baron Ravensworth in 1747)

=== Barons Ravensworth, first creation (1747) ===
- Henry Liddell, 1st Baron Ravensworth (1708–1784)

=== Liddell baronets, of Ravensworth Castle (1642; reverted) ===
- Sir Henry George Liddell, 5th Baronet (1749–1791) High Sheriff of Northumberland 1785
- Sir Thomas Henry Liddell, 6th Baronet (1775–1855) (created Baron Ravensworth in 1821)

=== Barons Ravensworth, second creation (1821) ===
- Thomas Henry Liddell, 1st Baron Ravensworth (1775–1855)
- Henry Thomas Liddell, 2nd Baron Ravensworth (1797–1878) (created Earl of Ravensworth in 1874)

==== Earls of Ravensworth (1874) ====
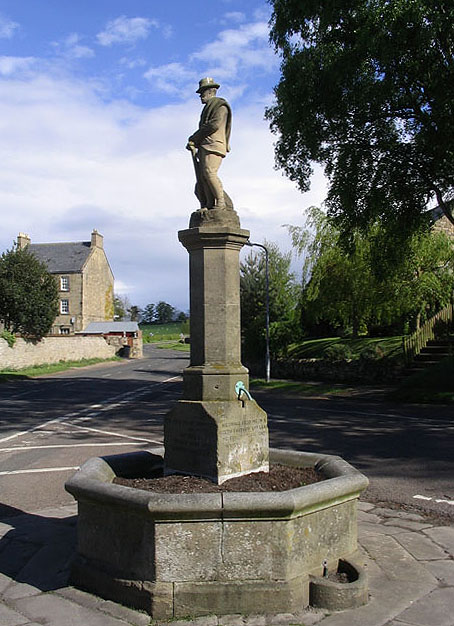
The fountain memorial to the 3rd Earl at Whittingham (erected by his wife, Caroline, Countess of Ravensworth)

- Henry Thomas Liddell, 1st Earl of Ravensworth, 2nd Baron Ravensworth (1797–1878)
- Henry George Liddell, 2nd Earl of Ravensworth, 3rd Baron Ravensworth (1821–1903)
- Atholl Charles John Liddell, 3rd Earl of Ravensworth, 4th Baron Ravensworth (1833–1904)

==== Barons Ravensworth (1821; reverted) ====
- Arthur Thomas Liddell, 5th Baron Ravensworth (1837–1919)
- Gerald Wellesley Liddell, 6th Baron Ravensworth (1869–1932)
- Robert Arthur Liddell, 7th Baron Ravensworth (1902–1950)
- Arthur Waller Liddell, 8th Baron Ravensworth (1924–2004)
- Thomas Arthur Hamish Liddell, 9th Baron Ravensworth (born 1954)

The heir apparent is the present holder's eldest son, Henry Arthur Thomas Liddell (born 1987)

== Arms ==
Coat of arms of Baron Ravensworth
Coronet That of a baron. Crest A lion rampant sable, billetée and crowned with an eastern crown or. Escutcheon Argent, fretty gules, on a chief gules three leopards' faces or. Supporters Two leopards or, semée of golps, and gorged with mural crowns purpure. Motto Fama semper vivit (Fame lives always), and unus et idem (One and the same).
