= Hedworth Lambton (MP) =

British politician (1797–1876)

Hedworth Lambton (26 March 1797 – 16 September 1876) was a Liberal Party politician in the United Kingdom. He was Member of Parliament (MP) for North Durham from 1832 to 1847.

Parliament of the United Kingdom
New constituency	Member of Parliament for North Durham; 1832 – 1847; With: Sir Hedworth Williamson, 1832–1837; Henry Liddell, 1837–1847	Succeeded by Robert Duncombe Shafto and Viscount Seaham
