= Henry Liddell, 1st Earl of Ravensworth =

British peer and politician (1797–1878)

The Right Honourable The Earl of Ravensworth
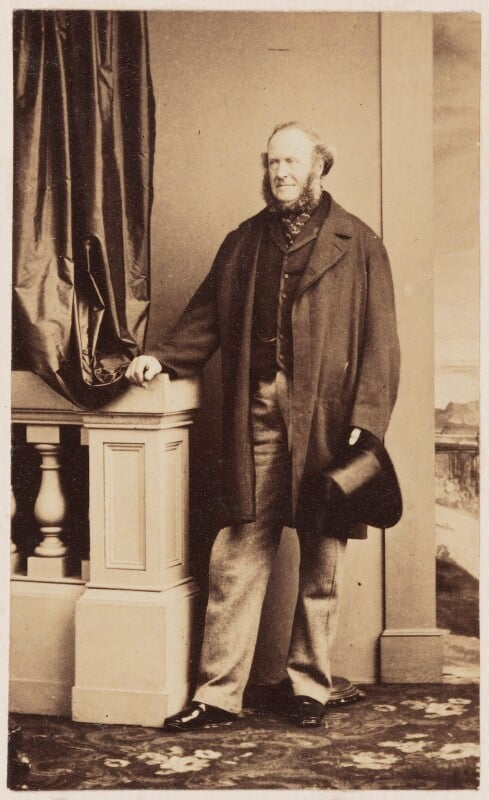
- Ravensworth in the 1860s

Member of Parliament for Liverpool
- In office 1853-1855 Serving with Thomas Berry Horsfall

Member of Parliament for North Durham
- In office 1837-1847 Serving with Hedworth Lambton

Member of Parliament for Northumberland
- In office 1826-1830 Serving with Matthew Bell

Personal details
- Born: 10 March 1797
- Died: 19 March 1878 (aged 81)
- Children: Henry Liddell
- Parent: Thomas Liddell (father)
- Education: St John's College, Cambridge

Henry Thomas Liddell, 1st Earl of Ravensworth (10 March 1797 – 19 March 1878) was a British peer and Member of Parliament who represented several constituencies.

== Biography ==
Liddell was the eldest son of Thomas Liddell. He was educated at Eton and St John's College, Cambridge. In the House of Commons, he represented Northumberland from 1826 to 1830, North Durham from 1837 to 1847, and Liverpool from 1853 to 1855. Upon succeeding to his father's peerage in 1855, he became known as Lord Ravensworth.

In Parliament, Liddell often aligned with the Tory side of debates. He supported Catholic Emancipation but opposed the Reform Acts. In 1874, he was created Earl of Ravensworth and Baron Eslington. He married Isabella Horatia, daughter of Lord George Seymour and Isabella, daughter of Rev. George Hamilton. These titles passed to his son Henry Liddell upon his death. Upon Henry's death in 1903, the earldom was inherited by his brother Atholl, who died the following year.

== Arms ==
Coat of arms of Henry Liddell, 1st Earl of Ravensworth
Coronet That of a baron. Crest A lion rampant sable, billetée and crowned with an eastern crown or. Escutcheon Argent, fretty gules, on a chief gules three leopards' faces or. Supporters Two leopards or, semée of golps, and gorged with mural crowns purpure. Motto Fama semper vivit (Fame lives always), and unus et idem (One and the same).

Parliament of the United Kingdom
Preceded by Matthew Bell; Thomas Wentworth Beaumont	Member of Parliament for Northumberland; 1826 – 1830; With: Matthew Bell	Succeeded by Matthew Bell; Thomas Wentworth Beaumont
Preceded by Hedworth Lambton; Sir Hedworth Williamson, Bt	Member of Parliament for North Durham; 1837 – 1847; With: Hedworth Lambton	Succeeded by Robert Duncombe Shafto; Viscount Seaham
Preceded by Charles Turner; William Forbes Mackenzie	Member of Parliament for Liverpool; 1853 – 1855; With: Thomas Berry Horsfall	Succeeded by Thomas Berry Horsfall; Joseph Christopher Ewart
Peerage of the United Kingdom
New creation	Earl of Ravensworth; 1874–1878	Succeeded by Henry Liddell
Preceded by Thomas Liddell	Baron Ravensworth; 1855–1878	Succeeded by Henry Liddell
