= North Durham =

UK Parliament constituency (since 1983)

- County constituency for the House of Commons
- Interactive map of boundaries since 2024
- Location in North East England
- County: County Durham
- Electorate: 73,226 (2024)
- Major settlements: Stanley; Chester-le-Street

Current constituency
- Created: 1983
- Member of Parliament: Luke Akehurst (Labour)
- Seats: One
- Created from: Chester-le-Street; Consett

1832–1885
- Seats: Two
- Type of constituency: County constituency
- Created from: Durham
- Replaced by: Jarrow; Houghton-le-Spring; Chester-le-Street; Mid Durham; North West Durham

North Durham is a constituency (Note: A county constituency (for the purposes of election expenses and type of returning officer)) represented in the House of Commons of the UK Parliament since 2024 by Luke Akehurst of the Labour Party. (Note: As with all constituencies, the constituency elects one Member of Parliament (MP) by the first past the post system of election at least every five years.)

== Constituency profile ==
North Durham is a constituency in County Durham in North East England. Its largest town is Chester-le-Street, which has a population of around 24,000. Other settlements include the town of Stanley and the villages of Ouston, Pelton, Great Lumley, Sacriston, Annfield Plain, Catchgate and Lanchester.

This area has a history of coal mining. The decline of the industry in the late 20th century left the area with high rates of unemployment, and the constituency still has high levels of deprivation today. Chester-le-Street is more affluent, however Stanley and its nearby villages are amongst the top 10% most-deprived areas in England. Chester-le-Street and Stanley largely function as commuter towns; the cities of Sunderland and Newcastle upon Tyne are both located around 10 miles (16 km) away. The constituency's average house price is less than half the UK average.

North Durham has a large retired population and a below-average proportion of working-age adults. Residents have low levels of education, average rates of homeownership and are more likely to be religious compared to the rest of the country. Household income is low and the child poverty rate is above average. A high proportion of residents work in the health, manufacturing and transport sectors, with few in professional occupations. The percentage claiming unemployment benefits is below average. White people made up 98% of residents at the 2021 census.

Most of the constituency is represented by Reform UK at the local council with some independent councillors elected in Chester-le-Street. An estimated 58% of voters in North Durham supported leaving the European Union in the 2016 referendum, higher than the UK-wide figure of 52%.

== History ==
A constituency formally named the Northern Division of Durham was created by the Great Reform Act for the 1832 general election, when the former Durham constituency was split into the northern and southern divisions, each electing two members using the bloc vote system.

This seat was abolished by the Redistribution of Seats Act 1885 when the two divisions were replaced by eight single-member divisions. These were Barnard Castle, Bishop Auckland, Chester-le-Street, Houghton-le-Spring, Jarrow, Mid Durham, North West Durham and South East Durham. In addition, there were seven County Durham borough constituencies.

The seat was re-created as a single-seat constituency for the 1983 general election as a result of the redistribution following the changes to local authority boundaries under the Local Government Act 1972. The new constituency comprised those parts of the abolished Chester-le-Street constituency retained within the reconstituted county of Durham, together with those parts of the abolished Consett constituency which had comprised the urban district of Stanley.

== Historic ==
From 1832–1868 and this area was left intact until 1885. Extract from 1837 result: the shorter solid orange area which has an east coast.

=== 1832–1885 ===
- The Wards of Chester and Easington, with a place of election at Durham.

See map on Vision of Britain website.

Included non-resident 40 shilling freeholders in the parliamentary boroughs of Durham, Gateshead, South Shields and Sunderland.

=== 1983–1997 ===
- The District of Chester-le-Street; and
- the District of Derwentside wards of Annfield Plain, Burnopfield, Catchgate, Craghead, Dipton, Havannah, South Moor, South Stanley, Stanley Hall, and Tanfield.

=== 1997–2010 ===
- The District of Chester-le-Street; and
- the District of Derwentside wards of Annfield Plain, Catchgate, Craghead, Havannah, South Moor, South Stanley, Stanley Hall, and Tanfield.

Burnopfield and Dipton wards were transferred to the redrawn North West Durham.

=== 2010–2024 ===
Map of 2010–2024 boundaries

- The District of Chester-le-Street; and
- the District of Derwentside wards of Annfield Plain, Catchgate, Craghead and South Stanley, Havannah, South Moor, Stanley Hall, and Tanfield.

Following a review of parliamentary representation in County Durham in 2007, the Boundary Commission for England decided to retain the 1997 boundaries despite the official description of the constituency changing slightly in terms of the names of the local authority wards. In the 2009 structural changes to local government in England, the local authority districts in Durham were abolished and replaced with a single unitary authority; however, this did not affect the boundaries of the constituency.

=== Current ===
Further to the 2023 review of Westminster constituencies, which came into effect for the 2024 general election, the constituency was defined as composing the following electoral divisions of County Durham (as they existed on 1 December 2020):

- Annfield Plain; Chester-le-Street East; Chester-le-Street North; Chester-le-Street South; Chester-le-Street West Central; Craghead and South Moor; Lanchester; Lumley; North Lodge; Pelton; Sacriston; Stanley; Tanfield.

The constituency was expanded to bring the electorate within the permitted range, by adding the Lanchester ward from the abolished constituency of North West Durham.

Further to a local government boundary review which came into effect in May 2025, the constituency now comprises the following electoral divisions of County Durham:

- Annfield Plain and Tanfield; Chester-le-Street North; Chester-le-Street South; Consett South (small part comprising the parish of Healeyfield); Craghead and South Moor; Lanchester and Burnhope; Lumley and West Rainton (most - including Great Lumley); North Lodge; Pelton; Sacriston and Witton Gilbert (most - including Sacriston); Stanley; Weardale (very small part comprising the parish of Muggleswick).

The constituency spans the north of County Durham in North East England. It includes the whole of the former Chester-le-Street district and the eastern part of the former Derwentside district. The main population centres (large settlements) are Chester-le-Street, Stanley and Sacriston. The constituency includes the North of England Open Air Museum at Beamish.

== Members of Parliament ==
=== MPs 1832–1885 ===
Election	First member	First party	Second member	Second party
1832	Hedworth Lambton	Whig	Sir Hedworth Williamson, Bt	Whig
1837	Hedworth Lambton	Whig	Hon. Henry Liddell	Conservative
1847	Robert Duncombe Shafto	Whig	George Vane-Tempest	Conservative
1854 by-election	Robert Duncombe Shafto	Whig	Lord Adolphus Vane-Tempest	Conservative
1859	Robert Duncombe Shafto	Liberal	Lord Adolphus Vane-Tempest	Conservative
1864 by-election	Robert Duncombe Shafto	Liberal	Sir Hedworth Williamson, Bt	Liberal
1868	George Elliot	Conservative	Sir Hedworth Williamson, Bt	Liberal
1874	Sir Lowthian Bell	Liberal	Charles Palmer	Liberal
1874 by-election	Sir George Elliot, Bt	Conservative	Charles Palmer	Liberal
1880	John Joicey	Liberal	Charles Palmer	Liberal
1881 by-election	Sir George Elliot, Bt	Conservative	Charles Palmer	Liberal
1885	Redistribution of Seats Act: constituency abolished			

=== MPs since 1983 ===
Election	Member	Party
1983	Giles Radice	Labour
2001	Kevan Jones	Labour
2024	Luke Akehurst	Labour

== Elections ==
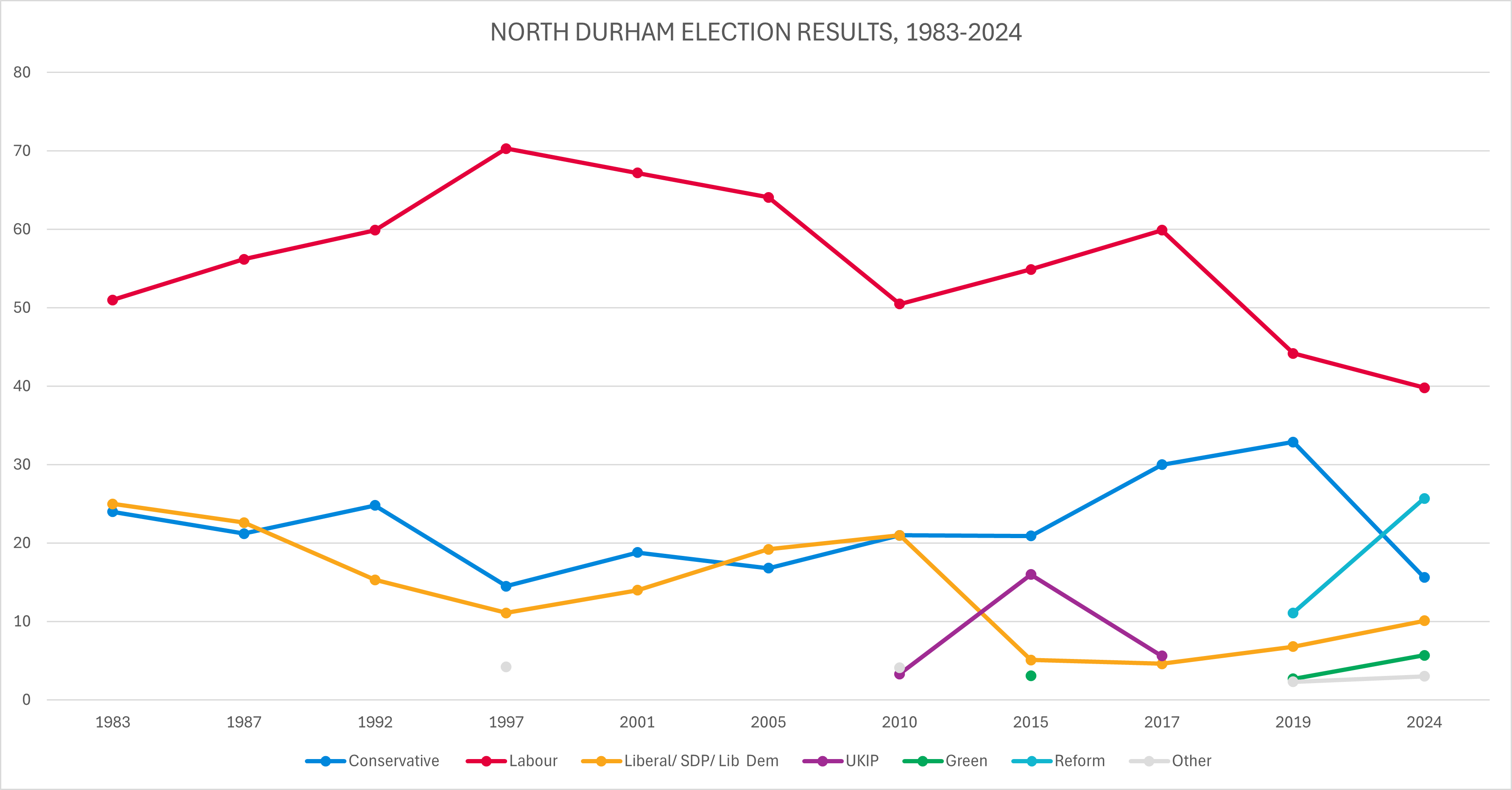
Election results 1983–2024

=== Elections in the 2020s ===
General election 2024: North Durham
Party	Candidate	Votes	%	±%
Labour	Luke Akehurst	16,562	39.8	−3.9
Reform	Andrew Husband	10,689	25.7	+15.0
Conservative	George Carter	6,492	15.6	−18.8
Liberal Democrats	Craig Martin	4,208	10.1	+3.7
Green	Sunny Moon-Schott	2,366	5.7	+3.1
Workers Party	Chris Bradburn	928	2.2	N/A
SDP	Tom Chittenden	320	0.8	N/A
Majority		5,873	14.1	+2.8
Turnout		41,565	56.8	−6.4
Registered electors		73,235		
Labour hold		Swing	−9.4	

=== Elections in the 2010s ===
General election 2019: North Durham
Party	Candidate	Votes	%	±%
Labour	Kevan Jones	18,639	44.2	−15.7
Conservative	Edward Parson	13,897	32.9	+2.9
Brexit Party	Peter Telford	4,693	11.1	New
Liberal Democrats	Craig Martin	2,879	6.8	+2.2
Green	Derek Morse	1,126	2.7	New
Independent	Ken Rollings	961	2.3	New
Majority		4,742	11.3	−18.6
Turnout		42,195	63.2	−1.4
Labour hold		Swing	−9.3	

General election 2017: North Durham
Party	Candidate	Votes	%	±%
Labour	Kevan Jones	25,917	59.9	+5.0
Conservative	Laetitia Glossop	12,978	30.0	+9.1
UKIP	Kenneth Rollings	2,408	5.6	−10.4
Liberal Democrats	Craig Martin	1,981	4.6	−0.5
Majority		12,939	29.9	−4.1
Turnout		43,284	64.6	+3.2
Labour hold		Swing	−2.0	

General election 2015: North Durham
Party	Candidate	Votes	%	±%
Labour	Kevan Jones	22,047	54.9	+4.4
Conservative	Laetitia Glossop	8,403	20.9	−0.1
UKIP	Malcolm Bint	6,404	16.0	+12.7
Liberal Democrats	Peter Maughan	2,046	5.1	−15.9
Green	Victoria Nolan	1,246	3.1	New
Majority		13,644	34.0	+4.5
Turnout		40,146	61.4	+0.8
Labour hold		Swing	+2.3	

General election 2010: North Durham
Party	Candidate	Votes	%	±%
Labour	Kevan Jones	20,698	50.5	−13.6
Conservative	David Skelton	8,622	21.0	+4.2
Liberal Democrats	Ian Lindley	8,617	21.0	+1.9
BNP	Peter Molloy	1,686	4.1	New
UKIP	Bruce Reid	1,344	3.3	New
Majority		12,076	29.5	−15.4
Turnout		40,967	60.6	+5.3
Labour hold		Swing	−8.9	

=== Elections in the 2000s ===
General election 2005: North Durham
Party	Candidate	Votes	%	±%
Labour	Kevan Jones	23,932	64.1	−3.1
Liberal Democrats	Philip Latham	7,151	19.2	+5.2
Conservative	Mark Watson	6,258	16.8	−2.0
Majority		16,781	44.9	−3.5
Turnout		37,341	55.3	−1.6
Labour hold		Swing	−4.1	

General election 2001: North Durham
Party	Candidate	Votes	%	±%
Labour	Kevan Jones	25,920	67.2	−3.1
Conservative	Matthew R. Palmer	7,237	18.8	+4.3
Liberal Democrats	Carole A. Field	5,411	14.0	+2.9
Majority		18,683	48.4	−7.4
Turnout		38,568	56.9	−12.3
Labour hold		Swing		

=== Elections in the 1990s ===
General election 1997: North Durham
Party	Candidate	Votes	%	±%
Labour	Giles Radice	33,142	70.3	+10.4
Conservative	Mark T. Hardy	6,843	14.5	−10.3
Liberal Democrats	Brian D. Moore	5,225	11.1	−4.2
Referendum	Ian A. C. Parkin	1,958	4.2	New
Majority		26,299	55.8	+20.7
Turnout		47,168	69.2	−6.9
Labour hold		Swing		

General election 1992: Durham North
Party	Candidate	Votes	%	±%
Labour	Giles Radice	33,567	59.9	+3.7
Conservative	Elizabeth A. Sibley	13,930	24.8	+3.6
Liberal Democrats	Philip J. Appleby	8,572	15.3	−7.3
Majority		19,637	35.1	+1.5
Turnout		56,069	76.1	+0.2
Labour hold		Swing		

=== Elections in the 1980s ===
General election 1987: Durham North
Party	Candidate	Votes	%	±%
Labour	Giles Radice	30,798	56.2	+5.2
SDP	Derek Jeary	12,365	22.6	−2.4
Conservative	Nicholas Gibbon	11,602	21.2	−2.8
Majority		18,433	33.6	+7.6
Turnout		54,765	75.9	+3.2
Labour hold		Swing	+3.9	

General election 1983: Durham North
Party	Candidate	Votes	%	±%
Labour	Giles Radice	26,404	51.0	
Liberal	David Howarth	12,967	25.0	
Conservative	Andrew Popat	12,418	24.0	
Majority		13,437	26.0	
Turnout		51,789	72.7	
Labour win (new seat)				

=== Elections in the 1880s ===
By-election, 7 September 1881: Durham North (1 seat)
Party	Candidate	Votes	%	±%
Conservative	George Elliot	5,548	53.1	+23.5
Liberal	James Laing	4,896	46.9	−23.6
Majority		652	6.2	N/A
Turnout		10,444	78.9	−7.1 (est)
Registered electors		13,233		
Conservative gain from Liberal		Swing	+23.6	

General election 1880: Durham North (2 seats)
Party	Candidate	Votes	%	±%
Liberal	John Joicey	6,233	36.2	+9.3
Liberal	Charles Palmer	5,901	34.3	+7.7
Conservative	George Elliot	5,092	29.6	+4.8
Majority		809	4.7	+2.8
Turnout		11,325 (est)	86.0 (est)	+10.7
Registered electors		13,165		
Liberal hold		Swing		
Liberal hold		Swing		

=== Elections in the 1870s ===
By-election, 22 June 1874: Durham North (2 seats)
Party	Candidate	Votes	%	±%
Liberal	Charles Palmer	4,256	33.7	+7.0
Conservative	George Elliot	4,254	33.7	−12.7
Liberal	Lowthian Bell	4,104	32.5	+5.6
Turnout		8,434 (est)	78.4	+3.1
Registered electors		10,760		
Majority		2	0.0	−2.1
Liberal hold		Swing	+6.7	
Majority		150	1.2	N/A
Conservative gain from Liberal		Swing	−6.0	

- Caused by the 1874 election being declared void on petition.

General election 1874: Durham North (2 seats)
Party	Candidate	Votes	%	±%
Liberal	Lowthian Bell	4,364	26.9	−3.7
Liberal	Charles Palmer	4,327	26.7	−5.4
Conservative	George Elliot	4,011	24.8	+6.2
Conservative	Richard Laurence Pemberton	3,501	21.6	+3.0
Majority		353	2.1	N/A
Turnout		8,102 (est)	75.3 (est)	−5.7
Registered electors		10,760		
Liberal gain from Conservative		Swing	−3.4	
Liberal hold		Swing	−5.8	

=== Elections in the 1860s ===
General election 1868: Durham North (2 seats)
Party	Candidate	Votes	%	±%
Conservative	George Elliot	4,649	37.2	+8.8
Liberal	Hedworth Williamson	4,011	32.1	−5.0
Liberal	Lowthian Bell	3,822	30.6	−3.9
Majority		827	6.6	N/A
Turnout		8,566 (est)	81.0 (est)	−1.7
Registered electors		10,576		
Conservative gain from Liberal		Swing	+4.2	
Liberal hold		Swing	−4.7	

General election 1865: Durham North (2 seats)
Party	Candidate	Votes	%	±%
Liberal	Hedworth Williamson	2,888	37.1	N/A
Liberal	Robert Duncombe Shafto	2,689	34.5	N/A
Conservative	George Barrington	2,210	28.4	N/A
Majority		678	8.7	N/A
Turnout		4,999 (est)	82.7 (est)	N/A
Registered electors		6,042		
Liberal hold		Swing	N/A	
Liberal gain from Conservative		Swing	N/A	

By-election, 28 June 1864: Durham North (1 seat)
Party	Candidate	Votes	%	±%
Liberal	Hedworth Williamson	Unopposed		
Liberal gain from Conservative				

- Caused by Vane-Tempest's death.

=== Elections in the 1850s ===
General election 1859: Durham North (2 seats)
Party	Candidate	Votes	%	±%
Liberal	Robert Duncombe Shafto	Unopposed		
Conservative	Adolphus Vane-Tempest	Unopposed		
Registered electors		5,863		
Liberal hold				
Conservative hold				

General election 1857: Durham North (2 seats)
Party	Candidate	Votes	%	±%
Whig	Robert Duncombe Shafto	Unopposed		
Conservative	Adolphus Vane-Tempest	Unopposed		
Registered electors		5,847		
Whig hold				
Conservative hold				

By-election, 1 April 1854: Durham North
Party	Candidate	Votes	%	±%
Conservative	Adolphus Vane	Unopposed		
Conservative hold				

- Caused by Vane-Tempest's succession to the peerage, becoming Earl Vane

General election 1852: Durham North (2 seats)
Party	Candidate	Votes	%	±%
Whig	Robert Duncombe Shafto	Unopposed		
Conservative	George Vane-Tempest	Unopposed		
Registered electors		6,631		
Whig hold				
Conservative hold				

=== Elections in the 1840s ===
General election 1847: Durham North (2 seats)
Party	Candidate	Votes	%	±%
Whig	Robert Duncombe Shafto	Unopposed		
Conservative	George Vane-Tempest	Unopposed		
Registered electors		6,472		
Whig hold				
Conservative hold				

General election 1841: Durham North (2 seats)
Party	Candidate	Votes	%	±%
Whig	Hedworth Lambton	Unopposed		
Conservative	Henry Liddell	Unopposed		
Registered electors		5,824		
Whig hold				
Conservative hold				

=== Elections in the 1830s ===
General election 1837: Durham North (2 seats)
Party	Candidate	Votes	%
Whig	Hedworth Lambton	2,358	35.0
Conservative	Henry Liddell	2,323	34.5
Whig	William Chaytor	2,062	30.6
Turnout		4,282	82.8
Registered electors		5,170	
Majority		35	0.5
Whig hold			
Majority		261	3.9
Conservative gain from Whig			

General election 1835: Durham North (2 seats)
Party	Candidate	Votes	%
Whig	Hedworth Lambton	Unopposed	
Whig	Hedworth Williamson	Unopposed	
Registered electors		4,772	
Whig hold			
Whig hold			

General election 1832: Durham North (2 seats)
Party	Candidate	Votes	%
Whig	Hedworth Lambton	2,558	39.9
Whig	Hedworth Williamson	2,182	34.0
Tory	Edward Richmond-Gale-Braddyll	1,676	26.1
Majority		506	7.9
Turnout		3,841	90.0
Registered electors		4,267	
Whig win (new seat)			
Whig win (new seat)			

== See also ==
- List of parliamentary constituencies in County Durham
- History of parliamentary constituencies and boundaries in Durham
- List of parliamentary constituencies in North East England (region)
