= Ravensworth Castle, Lamesley =

Castle in Tyne and Wear, England

Ravensworth Castle
- Gateshead, Tyne and Wear, England
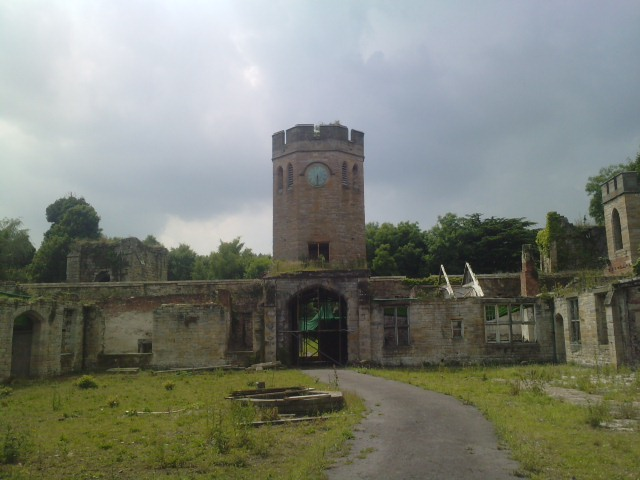

Site information
- Condition: Ruined

Location
- Shown within Tyne and Wear
- Coordinates: 54.9264°N 1.6387°W
- Grid reference: grid reference NZ23255914

Listed Building – Grade II*
- Official name: Ravensworth Castle
- Designated: 1 February 1967
- Reference no.: 1025190

Ravensworth Castle is a ruinous Grade II* listed building and a scheduled monument situated at Lamesley, Tyne and Wear, England. The building has been destroyed and rebuilt a number of times, and was the seat of the Ravensworth barons, the Liddells.

== History ==
The castle may have started as a solar tower, which could have been added to an existing manor house in circa 1315. Further towers appear to have been added incrementally throughout the course of the 14th century.

Early owners included Fitz-Marmaduke, Viscount Lumley and Gascoigne. In 1607 the castle was purchased by Thomas Liddell, a wealthy Newcastle-upon-Tyne merchant. Liddell and his family would hold onto the estate for the following 300 years; much of their fortune would come from coal mining on the land, beginning in the early 17th century.

In 1724 Sir Henry Liddell built a substantial mansion within the curtilage of the castle, but this was demolished in 1808 by Sir Thomas Liddell, and replaced by a grand house designed in the Gothic Revival style by architect John Nash. The Duke of Wellington was entertained there in October 1827.

Georgiana, Lady Bloomfield, daughter of Sir Thomas, wrote about visiting the castle in 1831, while still in her childhood.

The property became a school for girls in the 1920s.

Around 1935 the family began mining for coal directly under the house, with demolition of the building starting around the same time. The intention was to use the wreckage to build a model village, but with the interruption of World War II, only three houses were created. The majority of the house had been demolished by 1953.

Ravensworth Castle was designated a Grade II* listed building in 1967. It was included on English Heritage's Register of Buildings at Risk in 2002.

== Restoration series ==
The castle was featured in the BBC's television programme Restoration. All thirty candidates from the series also featured in a book which was produced after the series.

== See also ==
- Castles in Great Britain and Ireland
- Grade II* listed buildings in Tyne and Wear
- List of castles in England
