= Charles Surtees =

British politician (1823-1906)

Charles Surtees DL JP FRGS

High Sheriff of Durham
- In office 1873–1873
- Preceded by: Rowland Burdon
- Succeeded by: John Fogg Elliot

Member of Parliament for South Durham
- In office 1865–1868 Serving with Joseph Whitwell Pease
- Preceded by: Henry Pease; James Farrer
- Succeeded by: Frederick Beaumont; Joseph Whitwell Pease

Personal details
- Born: Charles Freville Surtees; 13 November 1823 Heighington, County Durham
- Died: 22 December 1906 (aged 83) Charing Cross Hotel, London
- Party: Conservative
- Spouse: Bertha Chauncey (m. 1855; died 1882)
- Relations: Henry Surtees (brother)
- Children: Sir Herbert Conyers Surtees
- Education: Harrow College

Charles Freville Surtees DL JP FRGS (13 November 1823 – 22 December 1906) was a Conservative Party politician in England.

== Early life ==
Surtees was born on 13 November 1823 at Heighington, County Durham. He was the youngest son of four children born to the former Elizabeth Cookson (1783–1847) and Robert Surtees of Redworth Hall (1782–1857). His eldest brother, Robert Lambton Surtees, inherited the Redworth Hall after their father's in 1857. When his brother died unmarried with no children six years later in 1863, the property passed to another brother, Henry Edward Surtees MP for Hertfordshire (who married Eliza Snell Chauncey in 1843).

His paternal grandparents were first cousins Jane Surtees and Lt. Crosier Surtees, who died in 1803 when returning from a banquet with Lord Barnard at Raby Castle when he drunkenly fell into the moors and froze to death. His grandmother's sister, Dorothy Surtees (co-heiresses of William Steele, a director of the East India Company), also married a first cousin, Robert Surtees, and they were the parents of antiquarian Robert Surtees of Mainsforth. Charles became a member of the Surtees Society in 1859.

He was educated at Harrow before entering the British Army in 1842.

== Career ==
Surtees was a member of the 10th Royal Hussars, reaching the rank of Lieutenant in 1845, and captain in 1847. From 1873 he was Colonel of the 3rd Battalion of the Durham Light Infantry.

He served as a director of the Great Central Railway and was chairman of the Universal Life Assurance Society when it merged with North British and Mercantile Insurance Company in 1903.

=== Political career ===
He was elected as Member of Parliament (MP) for South Durham at the 1865 general election and served alongside Joseph Whitwell Pease, but was defeated by Frederick Beaumont at the 1868 general election. He did not stand in the 1874 general election, but failed to win a seat when he stood again in 1880.

In 1873, as Charles Freville Surtees of Mainsforth, Ferryhill he succeeded Rowland Burdon of The Castle at Castle Eden as High Sheriff of Durham. Surtees was himself succeeded by John Fogg Elliot of Elvet Hill. He also served as Deputy Lieutenant of Durham.

== Personal life ==
On 25 August 1855, Surtees was married to Bertha Chauncey (1833–1882), a daughter of Nathaniel Snell Chauncey, Esq. of Green End. Bertha was relative of Charles' older brother Henry's first wife, Eliza Snell Chauncey. Together, they were the parents of one son:

- Herbert Conyers Surtees (1858–1933), who in 1887 married Madeline Augusta Crabbe (d. 1957), daughter of Edward Crabbe and his wife Ruth Herbert, a stage actress and the artist's model to Dante Gabriel Rossetti.

He was a member of several of London's most prestigious gentlemen's clubs, including the Army and Navy Club, the Carlton Club, the United Service Club, the Cavalry Club and the Ranelagh Club. He was also made a Fellow of the Royal Geographical Society.

His wife died on 5 November 1882. Surtess died on 22 December 1906 at the Charing Cross Hotel in London. His funeral was held on 27 December at Long Ditton and was attended by Lady Paget, Col. Surtees, Horace Avery K.C., Mr. Sheath (Secretary of the South Eastern Railway Company), and Cosmo Bonsor among others.

=== Descendants ===
Through his only son, he was a grandfather of Dorothy Cynthia Surtees (1890–1957), who married Sir Patrick Ramsay (the second son of John Ramsay, 13th Earl of Dalhousie and a brother-in-law of Princess Patricia of Connaught (through her husband Sir Alexander Ramsay), a granddaughter of Queen Victoria); and Etelka Bertha Surtees (1891–1974), who married the American diplomat Edward J. Bell, and after his death, Sir James Leishman Dodds. During World War II, Dodds was the British Minister to Bolivia.

Parliament of the United Kingdom
Preceded by Henry Pease; James Farrer	Member of Parliament for South Durham; 1865 – 1868; With: Joseph Whitwell Pease	Succeeded by Frederick Beaumont; Joseph Whitwell Pease
