= Henry Surtees (MP) =

British Conservative Party politician

Henry Surtees MP JP DL

Member of Parliament for Hertfordshire
- In office 14 March 1864 – 21 November 1868 Serving with Abel Smith (1866–1868); Henry Cowper (1865–1868); Edward Bulwer-Lytton (1864–1865); Abel Smith (1864–1865)
- Preceded by: Abel Smith; Edward Bulwer-Lytton; Christopher William Puller
- Succeeded by: Henry Cowper; Abel Smith; Henry Brand

Personal details
- Born: 9 May 1819 Redworth Hall, Redworth, Co. Durham
- Died: 31 July 1895 (aged 76) St Hillier's, Alverstoke, Hampshire
- Resting place: St Michael, Heighington, Co. Durham
- Party: Conservative
- Spouse(s): Mary Isabella Adams (m. 1870) Elizabeth Snell Chauncy (m. 1843; died 1854)
- Children: Six
- Parent(s): Robert Surtees; Elizabeth Cookson
- Education: Harrow School

Henry Edward Surtees, JP DL, (9 May 1819 – 31 July 1895) was a British Conservative Party politician.

== Family ==
Born in Durham in 1819, Surtees was the son of Robert Surtees and Elizabeth Cookson. He first married Elizabeth Snell Chauncy, daughter of Charles Snell Chauncy and Elizabeth Beale, in 1843. Together they had three children:

- Elizabeth Ellen (1844–1914)
- Caroline Isabel (1848–1946)
- Georgina Mary (1849–1876)

After Elizabeth's death in 1854, he remarried to Mary Isabella Adams, daughter of Francis Adams and Maria Doveton, in 1870. Together, they had three children:

- Henry Siward Balliol (1873–1955)
- Cicely Isabel (1872– )
- Robert Lambton (1879– )

== Political career ==
He was elected MP for Hertfordshire at a by-election in 1864 and held the seat until 1868.

== Other activities ==
In 1839, Surtees became a Lieutenant in the 10th Royal Hussars. He was also a Justice of the Peace for Hertfordshire and County Durham, and a Deputy Lieutenant of Durham. In 1876, he was High Sheriff of Durham

Parliament of the United Kingdom
Preceded by Abel Smith; Edward Bulwer-Lytton; Christopher William Puller	Member of Parliament for Hertfordshire; 1864–1868; With: Abel Smith (1866–1868); Henry Cowper (1865–1868); Edward Bulwer-Lytton (1864–1865); Abel Smith (1864–1865)	Succeeded by Henry Cowper; Abel Smith; Henry Brand
