= Henry Pease (MP) =

English director and politician (1807–1881)

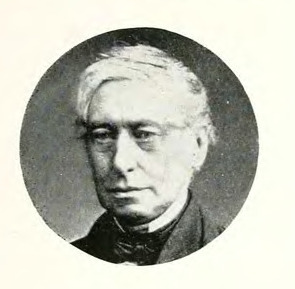
- Born: 4 May 1807
- Died: 30 May 1881 (aged 74); 23, Finsbury Square, London
- Monuments: Statue in Saltburn-by-the-Sea
- Era: Victorian

Henry Pease (4 May 1807 – 30 May 1881) was an English railway owner, peace campaigner and a Liberal politician who represented Durham South.

== Business ==
Pease was a director of the Stockton and Darlington Railway and was responsible for the foundation of the seaside resort of Saltburn-by-the-Sea.

== Politics ==
He was, for a time, the Peace Society President and, in 1854, he visited the Tsar of Russia in an attempt to talk him out of the Crimean War. He also visited Napoleon III in the interests of peace. Pease was elected MP for Durham South in 1857 and held the seat until 1865. In 1867, Henry Pease was appointed the first Darlington Mayor.

== Private life ==
Pease, a member of the Quaker Pease family of Darlington, was the fifth son of Edward Pease. An older brother of his was Joseph Pease. He was resident at Piermont, Darlington, and Stanhope Castle, Durham.

Pease married Anna Fell and they had one son Henry Fell Pease. He married a second time to Mary Lloyd and they had three sons and two daughters.

Pease died on 30 May 1881, of an illness diagnosed 2 weeks earlier, in his home at 23, Finsbury Square, London.

His will, dated 20 January 1859, left to Joseph Whitehall Pease the net personal estate being affirmed to be of the value of upwards of £360,000. To his wife Mrs. Mary Pease £2000 and an annuity of £500 for life, to then be reduced to £250 per annum. "If she is to marries again; she is also to have the right of residing at his mansion house, Piermont, with the use of the furniture, plates, pictures, effects and a carriage and horse for a twelvemonth after his decease". All of the residue of his real and personal estate to his said son, Mr. Henry Fell Pease.

== See also ==
- List of political families in the United Kingdom

Parliament of the United Kingdom
Preceded by Lord Harry George Vane; James Farrer	Member of Parliament for Durham South; 1857 – 1865; With: Lord Harry George Vane1857–1859; James Farrer 1859–1865	Succeeded by Joseph Whitwell Pease; Charles Freville Surtees
