= High Sheriff of Durham =

English ceremonial officer

This is a list of the high sheriffs of County Durham, England.

In most counties the high sheriff is the oldest secular office under the Crown. In the Palatinate of Durham the officeholder was appointed by and was accountable to the Bishop of Durham until 1836 when the Crown claimed authority. The High Sheriff was the principal law enforcement officer in the county but over the centuries most of the responsibilities associated with the post have been transferred elsewhere or are now defunct, so that its functions are now largely ceremonial. The High Sheriff changes every March.

== Pre-13th century ==
- Gilbert (appointed by Bishop Walcher)
- Philip fil. Haimonis (appointed by Bishop Ranulf Flambard)
- c. 1100–1146: Osbert (appointed by Bishop William of St. Barbara)
- c. 1152–1153: Gilbert Haget (appointed by Bishop Hugh de Puiset)
- c. 1153–1180: Ralph Haget
- c. 1180: William
- c. 1180–1195: Philip son of Hamo
- c. 1196–1197: Raynold Ganaunt
- c. 1198–1200: Leo de Heriz

== 13th century ==
- c. 1200: Reynold le Veneur
- c. 1200: Geoffrey Sarescut
- c. 1237–1242: William Grat (appointed by Bishop Nicholas Farnham)
- c. 1250: John Haldan (appointed by Bishop Walter of Kirkham)
- c. 1260: John Gylet, of Egglescliff
- c. 1261: Alexander de Bydyck
- c. 1273: Laurence de Lyntz
- c. 1275–1280: John de Malton (appointed by Bishop Robert of Holy Island)
- c. 1282: Walter Savage
- c. 1290: Guichard de Charon
- c. 1291–1299: Ralph de Warsop

== 14th Century ==
- c. 1300: John Shirlock or de Skyrelock
- c. 1302: John de Creppinge
- c. 1302–1303: John de Birtleye
- c. 1304: John Shirlock or de Skyrelock
- c. 1305: John de Birtleye
- c. 1306–1307: Thomas de Morton
- c. 1308–1310: Richard de Stanlawe
- 19 October 1312–1314: Adam de Bowes (appointed by Bishop Richard Kellaw)
- c. 1317–1318: Richard de Stanlawe
- c. 1323–1338: Adam de Bowes
  - by March 1323: Nicholas de Sutton (undersheriff)
  - John de Haneby or Hamby (undersheriff, appointed by Bishop Lewis de Beaumont)
  - John de Eggescliff or Eggisclive (undersheriff, appointed by Bishop Lewis de Beaumont)
  - William Brewere or Browere (undersheriff, appointed by Bishop Lewis de Beaumont)
  - c. 1334–April 1339: Simon de Esh (undersheriff)
- c. 1339–1342: John de Meneville or Meynvyle
- By February 1343: William de Mordon
- 26 January 1344: William de Blakyston
- 1 August 1345–April 1350: William de Mordon
  - By June 1355–August 1356: Robert de Bowes (undersheriff)
  - August 1356: William de Walworth (undersheriff)
  - August 1356–April 1358: John de Byrland (undersheriff)
  - By July 1358–January 1363: John de Claxton (undersheriff)
  - By March 1364–January 1367: William de Meneville (undersheriff)
- 10 November 1371: Sir Robert de Umfraville
  - May 1372: John Heron (undersheriff)
- March 1373: Robert de de Umfraville
  - By May 1374–1376: William de Elmeden (undersheriff)
- 30 January 1377: John de Hyndley
- 1 September 1379: Sir William de Bowes
  - By September 1382 – March 1385: Robert de Laton (undersheriff)
- 1385: Thomas de Boynton
- 29 April 1386: Sir William de Bowes
- 10 October 1390: Sir Marmaduke de Lumley
- 30 November 1391: Thomas de Boynton

== 15th century ==
- 18 January 1401: Sir Robert Conyers
- 24 August 1406: Sir Percival de Lyndeley
- 2 June 1414: Sir William Claxton
- 2 January 1420: Robert Eure
- 6 May 1436: Sir William Bowes
- 4 October 1437: Robert Ogle
- 1 October 1438: William Pudsay
- 5 December 1441: Geoffrey Midleton
- 28 December 1461: John de Aderton
- 8 December 1462: Geoffrey Midleton
- 7 March 1467: William Claxton
- 6 August 1469: Henry Radclyff
- 14 August 1470: Sir George Lumley
- 20 November 1476: Robert Tempest
- 4 October 1482 – 1502: Sir Ralph Bowes

== 16th century ==
- 16 January 1503–1515: Sir William Bulmer, of Wilton Castle
- 1 April 1516: Sir Ralph Bowes
- 8 November 1516–1517: Roger Lumley
- 21 March 1519–1522: Sir William Eure
- 1 May 1523–1526: Sir William Bulmer, of Wilton Castle
- 4 August 1527: Sir William Bulmer and Sir John Bulmer (jointly)
- 16 July 1529–1532: Sir John Bulmer
- 11 November 1532: Sir Thomas Hilton
- 25 November 1537–1549: Sir George Conyers
  - Michaelmas 1552: Cuthbert Conyers (undersheriff)
  - Michaelmas 1557: Sir Thomas Hilton (undersheriff)
  - Michaelmas 1558: Robert Tempest, of Holmside Hall (undersheriff)
  - Michaelmas 1562: Robert Bowes (undersheriff)
- 11 November 1575: Sir George Bowes
- 11 November 1576–1591: Sir William Hilton
- 1592–1594: George Conyers
- 22 May 1595–1610: Sir John Conyers, of Sockburn Hall

== 17th century ==
- 1608–1624: Sir George Selby of Whitehouse, Ryton
- 2 September 1624: Robert Robson
- 4 August 1625–1640: Sir William Belasyse, of Morton House
- 8 April 1641: William Collingwood
- 16 October 1641: Sir William Darcy
- 1645: Sir George Vane, of Barnard Castle
- 1 December 1646: Sir Richard Belasyse, of Morton House
- 17 November 1647: Clement Fulthorpe
- 2 January 1649: James Clavering
- 5 February 1649: Sir William Smith, Baronet
- 7 November 1649: James Clavering, of Axwell
- 21 November 1650: Clement Fulthorpe, the elder
- 31 December 1650: Thomas Shadforth
- 4 November 1651: Christopher Fulthorpe, the elder, of Tunstall Manor
- 12 November 1652: Francis Wren, of North Aukland
- 10 November 1653: Rowland Place, of Low Dinsdale Manor
- late 1654: Thomas Bewick
- late 1655: George Lilburn
- late 1656–58: Timothy Whittingham
- late 1658: Robert Ellison
- 24 July 1660: Sir Thomas Davison, of Blakiston Hall
  - 2 March 1664: Anthony Pearson (undersheriff)
  - 12 March 1666: Richard Neile (undersheriff)
- 1667–73: Sir Gilbert Gerard, 1st Baronet of Fiskerton
- 12 February 1671: Sir Gilbert Gerard, 1st Baronet of Fiskerton (renewed? after death of Bishop John Cosin)
  - 21 March 1672: Richard Neile (undersheriff)
- 6 June 1673: Sir James Clavering, 1st Baronet, of Axwell House, Blaydon on Tyne
- 29 December 1674: Sir Gilbert Gerard, 1st Baronet of Fiskerton
  - 29 December 1674: John Spearman (undersheriff)
- 28 December 1675: Nicholas Conyers
  - 1685: John Spearman (undersheriff)
- 1690–1705: Charles Montagu

== 18th century ==
- May 1705: Mark Shafto, of Whitworth Hall
- 5 June 1712: John Shafto
- February 1714: Mark Shafto, of Whitworth Hall
- 1721: Sir Henry Liddell, 3rd Baronet, of Newton Hall
- 1723: Sir William Williamson, 4th Baronet, of Whitburn
- 1747: Sir Hedworth Williamson, 5th Baronet, of Whitburn
- 1789: Sir Hedworth Williamson, 6th Baronet, of Whitburn

== 19th century ==
- 1810–1814: Adam Askew, of Redheugh
- 1815–1818: William Hutchinson
- 1819–1826: William Keppel Barrington
- 1827–1828: Cuthbert Ellison, of Hebburn Hall
- 1829–1833: Charles John Clavering, of Axwell House
- 1833–1836: William Lloyd Wharton of Dryburn
- 1837: Anthony Wilkinson, of Coxhoe Hall
- 1838: Sir Robert Johnson-Eden, Bart., of Windlestone Hall
- 1839: Sir William Chaytor, Bart., of Witton Castle
- 1840: Sir Hedworth Williamson, Bart. of Whitburn
- 1841: William Russell of Brancepeth Castle
- 1842: Robert Eden Duncombe Shafto of Whitworth Park
- 1843: Edward Shippersden of Durham
- 1844: Henry Witham of Lartington Hall
- 1845: John William Williamson of Whickham
- 1846: Ralph Stephen Pemberton of Barnes and Usworth House
- 1847: John Fawcett of North Bailey
- 1848: Sir William Eden Bt of Windlestone Hall
- 1849: John Eden of Beamish Park
- 1850: Robert Hilyard of Horsley Hall
- 1851: Robert Henry Allan, of Blackwell Hall and Blackwell Grange
- 1852: John Bowes, of Streatlam Castle
- 1853: Frederick Acklom Milbank, of Hart
- 1854: Henry John Baker Baker, of Elemore Hall
- 1855: Robert Surtees of Redworth House
- 1856: Robert Smith Surtees of Hamsterley Hall
- 1857: William Beckwith, of Silksworth House
- 1858: Timothy Hutchinson, of Eggleston Hall
- 1859: Sir William Aloysius Clavering, Bart., of Axwell House
- 1860: Henry John Spearman, of Burn Hall
- 1861: Richard Lawrence Pemberton, of Barnes
- 1862: Henry George Surtees of Dinsdale Hall
- 1863: John Richard Westgarth Hildyard, of Horsley Hall
- 1864: John Harrison Aylmer of Walworth Castle
- 1865: William Peareth, of Usworth House
- 1866: William Edward Surtees, of Seaton Carew
- 1867: William Scurfield Grey, of Norton
- 1868: Anthony Wilkinson, of Hulam
- 1869: Thomas Charles Thompson, of Sherburn Hall
- 1870: William Briggs, of Hylton Castle, Sunderland
- 1871: James Cookson, of Neasham Hall
- 1872: Rowland Burdon, of The Castle, Castle Eden
- 1873: Charles Freville Surtees, of Mainsforth, Ferryhill
- 1874: John Fogg Elliot, of Elvet Hill, Durham
- 1875: Anthony Wilkinson, of Durham
- 1876: Henry Edward Surtees, of Redworth House and Redforth Grove
- 1877: Sir Hedworth Williamson, Bart., of Whitburn Hall
- 1878: John Joicey, of Newton Hall, Stocksfield, Northumberland
- 1879: James Laing, of Thornhill, Sunderland
- 1880: George John Scurfield, of Hurworth House
- 1881: Matthew Kearney, of the Ford, Lanchester
- 1882: Robert Anthony Burrell, of Fairthorne, Botley, Hants
- 1883: Alfred Backhouse, of Pilmore, Darlington
- 1884: Isaac Lowthian Bell, of Rownton Grange, Northallerton
- 1885: Christopher John Foyle Fawcett, of The North Bailey, Durham
- 1886: Joseph Richardson, of Potto Hall, Swainby, Northallerton
- 1887: Gerald Percy Vivian Aylmer, of Walworth Castle, Darlington
- 1888: David Dale of West Lodge, Darlington
- 1889: Lindsay Wood, of The Hermitage, Chester-le-Street
- 1890: William James Joicey, of Urpeth Lodge, Chester-le-Street
- 1891: Joseph Henry Straker, of Willington House, Willington
- 1892: Sir William Gray, of Greatham Cottage, West Hartlepool
- 1893: Edward Joicey, of Whinney House, Low Fell, Gateshead-on-Tyne
- 1894: Colonel Charles John Reed CB, of Springwell Hall, Durham
- 1895: Hugh Bell of Redbarns, Coatham, Redcar
- 1896: Major Robert Ropner, of Preston Hall, near Stockton-on-Tees
- 1897: Colonel Lancelot Allgood Gregson, of Burdon, Sunderland
- 1898: Samuel Peter Austin, of Cocken Hall, Fence Houses
- 1899: Utrick Alexander Ritson, of Calf Hall, Muggleswick Park, Consett, and Jesmond Gardens, Newcastle upon Tyne
- 1900: John Arundel Hildyard, of Horsley House, Eastgate, Darlington

== 20th century ==
- 1901: George Fenwick Boyd of Moorhouse, Leamside
- 1902: Sir William Henry Edward Chaytor, Bt., of Croft, Darlington
- 1903: John Ewer Jefferson Hogg of 59 Elm Park Gardens, SW London
- 1904: Sir Hedworth Williamson, Bt., of Whitburn Hall, near Sunderland
- 1905: John Edwin Rogerson of Mount Oswald, Durham
- 1906: Frank Stobart of Biddick Hall
- 1907: Rowland Burdon of The Castle, Castle Eden
- 1908: Slingsby Duncombe Shafto of Beamish Park
- 1909: William Cresswell Gray of Tunstall Manor, West Hartlepool
- 1910: Hon. James Arthur Joicey of Longhurst, Morpeth (later Baron Joicey)
- 1911: Lieut-Colonel John Henry Ropner, of Ragworth, Norton, Stockton-on-Tees
- 1912: Frederick Stirling Newall, of Castle Hill, Wylam-on-Tyne
- 1913: James Westell, of The Cloisters, Sunderland
- 1914: Francis Priestman, of Shotley Park, Shotley Bridge
- 1915: Sir Alfred Molyneux Palmer, of Walworth Castle, Darlington
- 1916: William Hustler Hustler, of Acklam Hall, Middlesbrough
- 1917: The Honourable Cyril Arthur Liddell, of Ravensworth Castle, Gateshead
- 1918: Brodrick Dale, of Apperley Dene, Stocksfield
- 1919: John Wood, of Coxhoe Hall, Coxhoe
- 1920: Arthur Francis Pease, of Middleton Lodge, Middleton Tyas
- 1921: Col. Maurice Bell (later Sir Maurice Bell) of Rounton Grange, Northallerton
- 1922: Sir John Storey Barwick, of Ashbrook Grange, Sunderland
- 1923: Capt. Rowland Burdon Webster, of Wolviston Hall, Stockton-on-Tees
- 1924: Sir Frank Brown, of Norton Priory, Stockton-on-Tees
- 1925: Lieut.-Col. George Herbert Stobart, of Harperley Park, Harperley
- 1926: Sir Thomas Garmondsway Wrightson, Bt., of The Manor House, Eryholme, near Darlington
- 1927: Brigadier-General Herbert Conyers Surtees, of Mainsforth Hall, Ferryhill
- 1928: John Henry Bacon Forster, of Whitworth House, Spennymoor
- 1929: Major Henry Siward Balliol Surtees, of Redworth Hall, Darlington
- 1930: John Stapylton Grey Pemberton, of Ramside, Durham
- 1931: Capt. Geoffrey Stirling Newall, of Shepherds Dene, Riding Mill, Northumberland
- 1932: Henry Peile, of Broomshiels Hall, Satley, Tow Law, Co. Durham
- 1933: Sir Arthur Nicholas Lindsay Wood, of The Hermitage, Chester-le-Street
- 1934: Standish Robert Gage Prendergast Vereker of Hamsterley Hall
- 1935: Col Frank Robert Simpson of Bradley Hall, Wylam
- 1936: Major Jonathan Lee Priestman of Shotley Park
- 1937: Leonard Ropner, of Preston Hall, Stockton-on-Tees
- 1938: Sir William Gray, of Tunstall Manor, West Hartlepool
- 1939: Frank Nicholson, of Southill Hall, near Chester-le-Street
- 1940: Colonel Sir Robert Chapman, of Undercliff, Cleadon, Sunderland
- 1941: Col. Harold Edward Kitching, of Elmwood, Hartburn, Stockton-on-Tees
- 1942: Col. Sir Thomas Andrews Bradford, of Aden Cottage, Durham
- 1943: Col. Hereward Sprot, of St. John's Hall, Wolsingham
- 1944: Captain Edward Ramsden, of Sands Hall, Sedgefield
- 1945: Colonel Charles Edwin Vickery, of Whorlton Grange, Whorlton, Barnard Castle
- 1946: Lieutenant-Colonel Richard Laurence Stapylton Pemberton, of Hawthorn Tower, Seaham
- 1947: Edward John Westgarth Hildyard, of Horsley Hall, Eastgate
- 1948: Major Frank Douglas Nicholson, of Quarry Hill, Brancepeth
- 1949: Captn Sydney Riley Lord of Newbus Grange, Neasham
- 1950: Lt Col. Robert Appleby Bartram of Broomshiels Hall, near Bishop Auckland
- 1951: Colonel Thomas George Greenwell, of Thornley Cottage, Tow Law, Bishop Auckland, Co. Durham
- 1952: Philip Ivan Pease, of Sledwick, Barnard Castle
- 1953: Major Sir (Lawrence) Andrew Common, of Hunter House, Shotley Bridge
- 1953: Thomas Hawksley Summerson, of Hall Garth, Coatham Mundeville, Darlington
- 1954: Brigadier Leslie Harrison McRobert, of Meadowcroft, West Hartlepool
- 1955: Major Sir Basil Robert James Simpson, of Bradley Hall, Wylam
- 1956: Maurice Oliver Pease, of Eldon House, Heighington, Darlington
- 1957: Major Aubone Bryce Surtees, of Hurworth Hall West, Hurworth-on-Tees, Darlington
- 1958: John Raymond Ropner, of Middleton Lodge, Middleton Tyas, Richmond, Yorks
- 1959: Sir John Gamrondsway Wrightson, of Neasham Hall, Darlington
- 1960: Lieut-Colonel Robert Macgowan Chapman of Cherry Tree House, Cleadon, near Sunderland
- 1961: Richard Boys-Stones, of Kyo Close, Wylam-on-Tyne
- 1962: Roger Trelawny Backhouse, of The East House, Great Smeaton, Northallerton, Yorkshire
- 1963: Commander Shannan Stevenson, of White Hall, Haughton-le-Skerne, Darlington
- 1964: John Charles Hedley Booth, of Meadow Bank, Castle Eden
- 1965: Christopher William Drewett Chaytor, of Croft Hall, Croft, near Darlington
- 1966: James Kenneth Hope, of West Park, Lanchester
- 1967: Colonel James Wadham Grant, of Northolme, Moor Lane, Whitburn
- 1968: Peter Guy Edwards, of Low Walworth Hall, near Darlington
- 1969: Norman Carse Marr, of Belle Vue, East Boldon, County Durham
- 1970: Ralph Meredyth Turton, of The Hall, Kildale, Yorkshire
- 1971: William Talbot Gray, of Eggleston Hall, Barnard Castle
- 1972: Sir James Steel, of Fawnlees Hall, Wolsingham
- 1973: Colonel Hugh Kirton, of Plawsworth House, Plawsworth, Chester-le-Street
- 1974: Elizabeth Scylla Riley Lord, of Low Dinsdale Old Rectory, Neasham, near Darlington
- 1975: Thomas Richard Featherstone Fenwick, of Bishop Oak, Wolsingham, Bishop Auckland
- 1976: Lieut.-Colonel Michael Radcliffe Kerens, of The Old Vicarage, Bolam, Darlington
- 1977: Major William Kemp Trotter, of The Deanery, Staindrop, near Darlington
- 1978: Colonel Sir William Allison Lee, of The Woodlands, Woodland Road, Darlington
- 1979: Captain Gerard Maurice Salvin, of Croxdale Hall, Durham
- 1980: Paul Douglas Nicholson, of Quarry Hill, Brancepeth, Durham
- 1981: Lieut-Colonel Robert Benjamin Humphreys, of Peppermires Cottage, Brancepeth, Durham
- 1982: George Christopher Bartram, of Eldon House, Heighington Village, Newton Aycliffe
- 1983: Frederick Guy Beadon, of Little Newsham Hall, Winston, Darlington
- 1984: John Wood Snowdon, of The Old Rectory, Brandsby, York
- 1985: David James Grant, of Aden Cottage, Whitesmocks, Durham
- 1986: Rosemarie Hume Gray, of Eggleston Hall, Eggleston, Barnard Castle
- 1987: Ian George Bonas, of Bedburn Hall, Hamsterley
- 1988: Robert Patrick Thompson, of The Old Rectory, Wycliffe, Whorlton, Barnard Castle
- 1989: James Tyrell Brockbank, of The Orange Tree, Shincliffe, Durham City
- 1990: Captain John Hubert McBain, of Westholme Hall, Winston, Darlington
- 1991: Sir Anthony Frederick Milbank, of Barningham Park, Richmond, North Yorkshire
- 1992: Elizabeth Ann Jennings, of Broomshiels Home Farm, Saitley, Bishop Auckland
- 1993: Desmond Walker
- 1994: Nicholas David Barclay Straker, of Sough Hill, Caldwell, Darlington
- 1995: Robert Sale, of Eryholme Grange, Hurworth, Darlington
- 1996: James Allan Marr, of Brancepeth
- 1997: Michael Philip Weston, Prebends Gate, 3 Quarryheads Lane, Durham City
- 1998: Sir William Gray, Eggleston Hall, Eggleston, Barnard Castle
- 1999: Frank Nicholson, Cocken House, Chester-le-Street
- 2000: Elizabeth Ann Smyth, Greenbank, Heighington, Darlington

== 21st century ==
- 2001: Thomas Macklyn Swan, The Old Hall, Bedburn, Hamsterley, Bishop Auckland
- 2002: Andrew Martell, Shotley Hall, Shotley Bridge, Consett
- 2003: Peter Morrison Cook, Broomsheils Hall, Satley, Bishop Auckland
- 2004: Richard Louis Coad, The Glebe, Thorpe, Barnard Castle
- 2005: Simon Jonathon Henry Still
- 2006: Sareth Ann Nainby-Luxmoore
- 2007: Ian Roberts Dewhirst
- 2008: Paul Francis Adrian Townley of Barnard Castle
- 2009: Alasdair MacConachie, of Darlington
- 2010: Bernard Robinson, of Cotherstone, Barnard Castle
- 2011: Roger Steven Peregrine Howell of Castle Eden
- 2012: Henry (Harry) Francis Cecil Vane of Selaby Hall, Gainford, Darlington
- 2013: Peter Stuart Bell of Old Elvet, Durham
- 2014: Gerald Charles Osborne of Croft
- 2015: James Mark Featherstone Fenwick of Foresters Lodge, Wolsingham
- 2016: Gerard Charles Joseph Salvin of Croxdale Hall, Durham
- 2017: Caroline Patricia Peacock of Bishop Auckland
- 2018: Dr Stephen Michael Cronin of Durham.
- 2019: Peter Haswell Candler of Durham
- 2020: David Andrew Gray of Bishop Auckland
- 2021: John Robert Harle of Brandon Village
- 2022: Shona Michelle Harper-Wilkes of Stanhope
- 2023: Anne Elizabeth Elliott of Ferryhill
- 2024: Harry Macklyn Swan of Barnard Castle
- 2025: John Michael Poole, Stockton-on-Tees
- 2026: Dr. Arnab Basu, Brancepeth

== Bibliography ==
- Hughes, A. (1898). List of Sheriffs for England and Wales from the Earliest Times to A.D. 1831. London: Eyre & Spottiswoode. (with amendments of 1963, Public Record Office)
