= Chedworth Roman Villa =

Roman villa near Chedworth, Gloucestershire, England

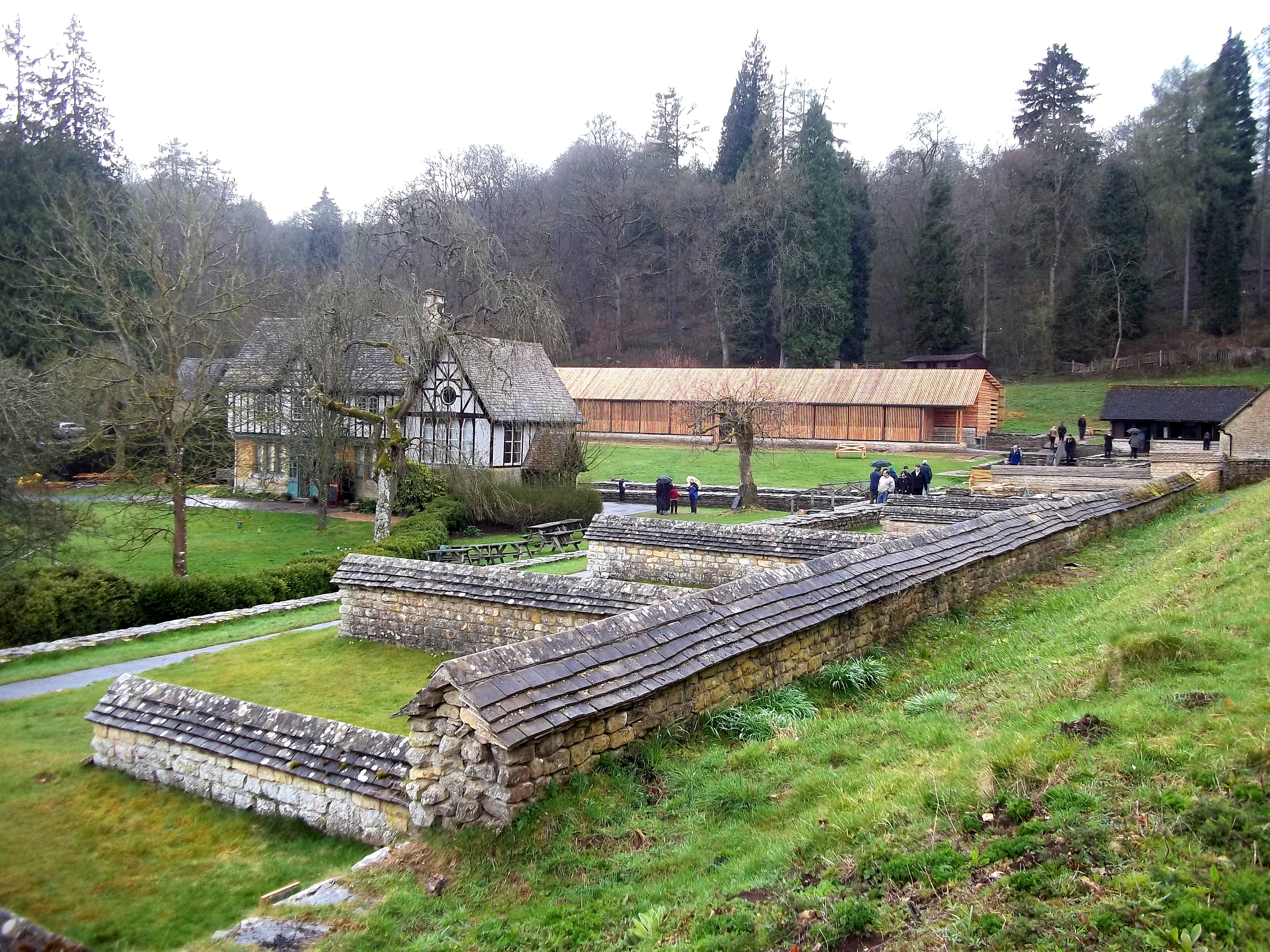

- Location within Gloucestershire
- 51°49′11″N 1°55′28″W
- OS grid reference: SP 05297 13465

History
- Built: c. 120 AD

Site notes
- Owner: National Trust

Scheduled monument
- Designated: 5 January 1927
- Reference no.: 1003324

Chedworth Roman Villa is located near Chedworth, Gloucestershire, England and is a scheduled monument. It is one of the largest and most elaborate Roman villas so far discovered in Britain and one with the latest occupation beyond the Roman period. The villa was built in phases from the early 2nd century to the 5th century, with the 4th-century construction transforming the building into an elite dwelling arranged around three sides of a courtyard. The 4th-century building included a heated and furnished west wing containing a dining-room (triclinium) with a fine mosaic floor, as well as two separate bathing suites: one for damp-heat and one for dry-heat.

The villa was discovered in 1864, and was excavated and opened to public view soon afterwards. It was acquired in 1924 by the National Trust who have conducted a long-term conservation programme, with new on-site facilities and cover-buildings.

Historians have debated whether Chedworth was a villa rustica or a religious sanctuary and hostel, as evidence has been found in support of both arguments. Most currently believe, however, that Chedworth was the former, inhabited by a very wealthy Romano-Briton.

== Siting ==
The villa stands in a sheltered, shady position overlooking the River Coln in the Cotswold Hills in Gloucestershire. It was located just off the Roman road known as the Fosse Way, and 8 mi (13 km) north of the important town of Corinium Dobunnorum (Cirencester). Cirencester's reputation as a centre of tribal government and a civitas capital led to quick romanisation of the area and resulting concentration of wealth. Chedworth's location in the Cotswolds and the valley of the River Coln was important for agriculture. It was one of about fifty villas in the Cotswolds, and one of nine in just a 5 miles (8.0 km) radius.

The villa was deliberately located next to a natural spring in the north west corner of the complex which was the villa's main source of water, and around which was later built an apsidal shrine to the water-nymphs (nymphaeum).

== History ==
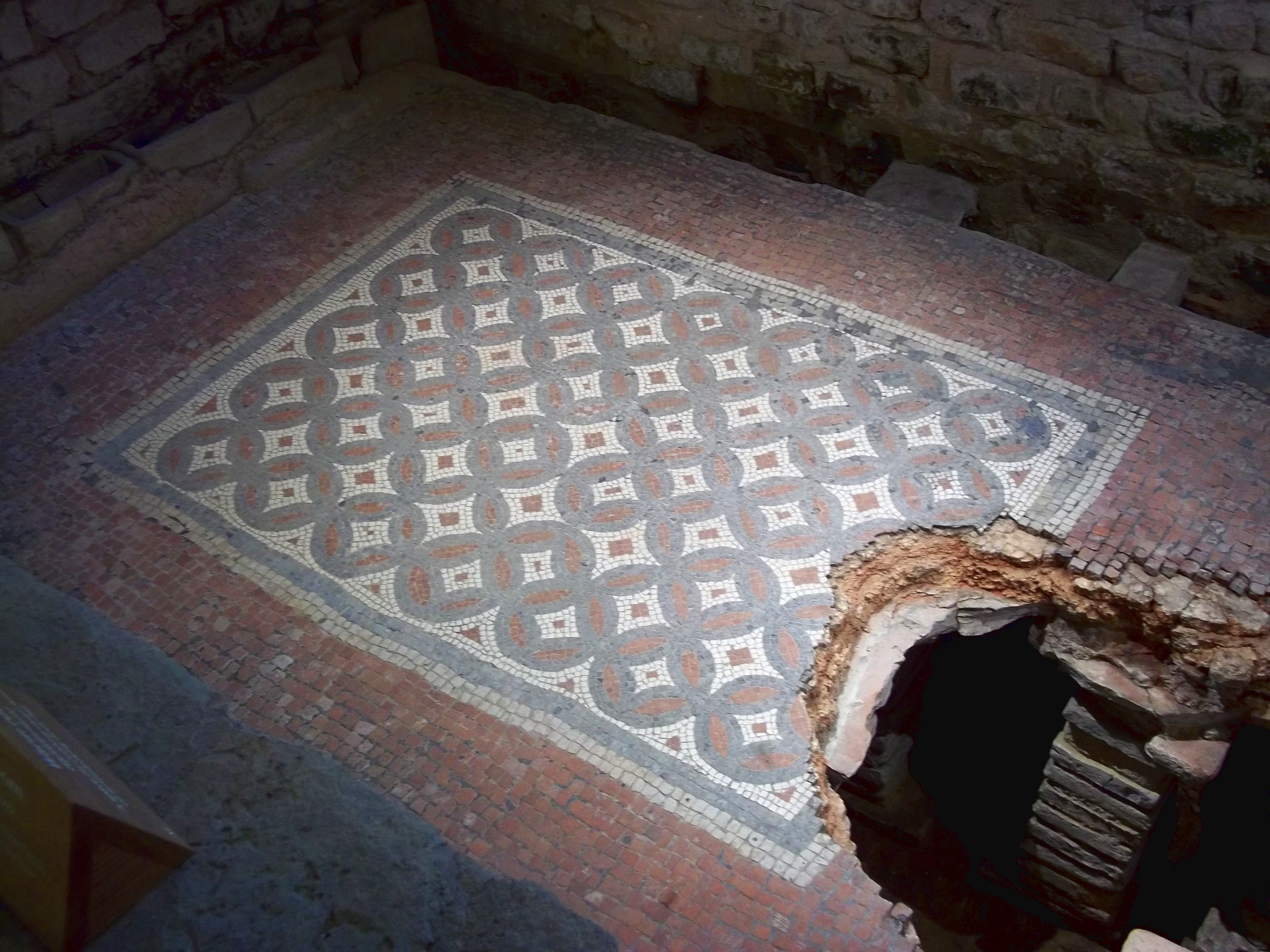
West bath house tepidarium mosaic

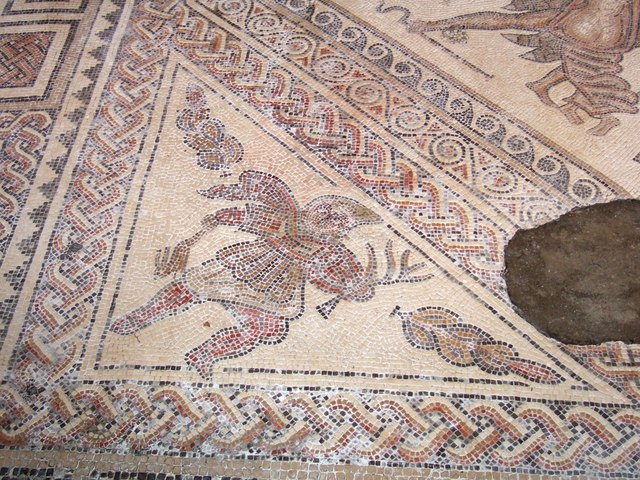
Detail of the Triclinium mosaic: winter

The two nearest settlements were Corinium (Cirencester) founded as forts in about 50, shortly after the Roman conquest, and Glevum (Gloucester) founded in 97. As the area became settled under Roman rule, these centres ceased to be military bases, soldiers retired to land provided by the Roman governorship in recognition of military service. It is noteworthy that twenty-two Roman villas have been found within a ten-mile radius of Chedworth. The villa may have been related to the retirement of these veteran soldiers.

The villa was founded about 120 and consisted of separate buildings around 3 sides of a rectangle open to the east with a bath house to the north. The original structures were typical of a working farm and outbuildings. The villa went through at least six stages of construction or re-construction.

In the early 3rd century (Phase II) the west and south wings were rebuilt following a fire, and the north bath suite was enlarged with extra rooms added to its eastern side. In the early 4th century (Phase III), the villa was transformed into an elite dwelling enclosing the courtyard. The existing wings were linked by a covered portico, and an inner garden and outer courtyard were created. The dining-room (triclinium) received its mosaics and the northern half of the west wing was converted to become a second set of baths. Shortly afterwards (Phase IIIA) the baths in the north wing were rebuilt and changed to dry-heat (laconicum) baths, which meant that the villa had both damp-heat and dry-heat bathing suites. The floors of at least 15 rooms were decorated with mosaics. In the late 4th century (Phase IV) the north wing was extended with the addition of a new dining-room. Many of the rooms, particularly the dining rooms were heated by hypocaust.

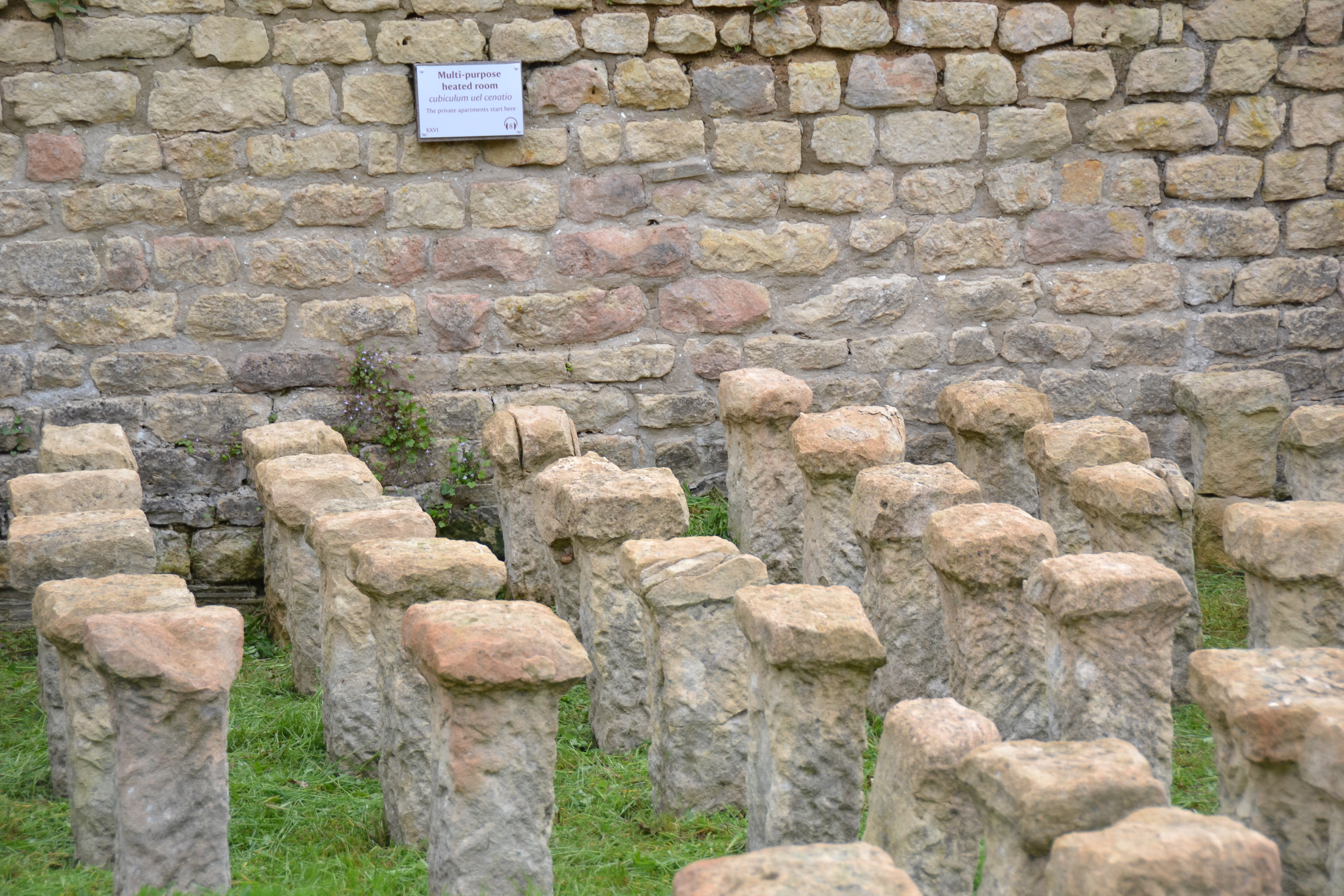
Hypocaust at Chedworth

A feature unique in Britain and discovered in 2017 is that a significant building phase of the villa dates from the 5th century after the end of Roman rule in Britain (410). In room 28 the mosaic and walls on the east and west sides were installed after 424. This is the first evidence that concentrated wealth funded Roman lifestyles in Britain for at least 50 years later than previously thought, as the building of new rooms with a mosaic is evidence of prestige spending on specialized skills including mosaic craftsmen. Other mosaics in neighbouring rooms, including room 30, show stylistic similarities and may also be of the 5th century.

Later a workshop was installed on top of the mosaic floor and two hearths, made out of pieces of architecture of the villa, were built into the worn floor of the room.

== Nymphaeum ==
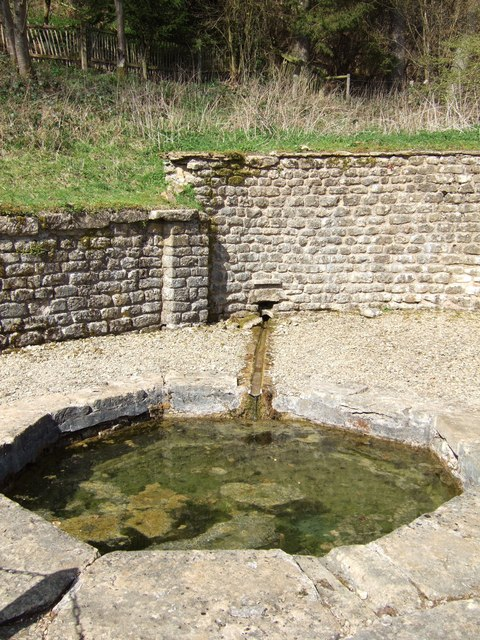
Nymphaeum

The pool in the north-west corner of the villa complex was developed from the naturally occurring fresh-water spring which most likely inspired the location of the villa in the first place. The spring became a location for an apsidal shrine to the water-nymphs (nymphaeum). The extant curved rear wall is 2 metres high and is the original Roman masonry.

All of the water needs of the villa were provided for by this spring. An octagonal pool is located at the centre and is still fed by the spring; a Christian chi-rho monogram was discovered scratched onto what was the rim of the pool. This symbol had a short presence in the early fourth century but was soon replaced by the original water nymphs.

== Temples ==
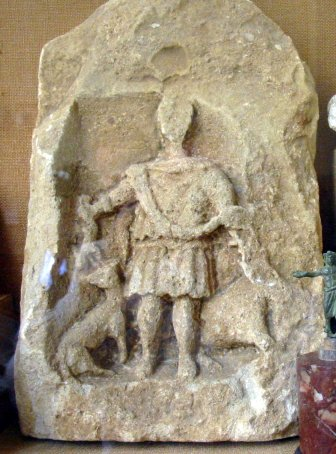
Stone carving of a hunter with a dog and stag

Foundations of a Romano-British temple have been excavated about 800 metres south-east of the villa buildings. The remains comprise the southwest and southeast corners of a rectangular building, measuring 16.5m by 16.0m. Altars preserved in the villa museum probably came from the temple as did coins, glass tesserae and a stone carved niche.

There was, however, another Roman building in Chedworth Woods about 150 metres northwest of the villa which was destroyed in the construction of the railway around 1869. Finds included coins, hexagonal tiles, fragments of pillars, part of a shell-headed niche and glass tesserae. The stone relief of a "hunter god" with hare, dog and stag, sometimes ascribed to the southeast temple, may have come from this site.

Another carved figure was discovered bearing a fragmentary inscription which it is believed may refer to the healing god Mars Lenus, a deity of the Treveri tribe in Gaul.

== Discovery and display ==
The villa was accidentally discovered in 1864 by Thomas Margetts, a gamekeeper who was digging for a ferret, and found fragments of mosaic tesserae. The site was subsequently excavated in 1865-7 by James Farrer, an antiquarian and the Member of Parliament for South Durham. The owner of the land was the Earl of Eldon, and it was he who financed the excavations, roofing for the mosaics, and the building of the mock-Tudor lodge to house the artifacts. Little, if anything, of the excavations was recorded. Only the best four mosaics were left exposed under shelters and the rest were reburied for their protection.

In 1924 the villa was acquired by the National Trust. Excavations have taken place periodically since then.

In 1957-1965 Prof. Ian Richmond excavated and re-interpreted Chedworth but died in 1965 without publishing any results. Parts of the villa were re-buried.

In 2011 a new cover building was provided for the mosaics in the west wing to ensure their preservation. A geophysical survey of the field east of the villa in 2012 revealed a central approach road running up from the valley floor and two other buildings, one a circular stone structure on the south side of the road. A new excavation campaign started in 2013 on the north wing and has revealed previously unrecorded mosaics, partially destroyed by Ian Richmond in 1964.

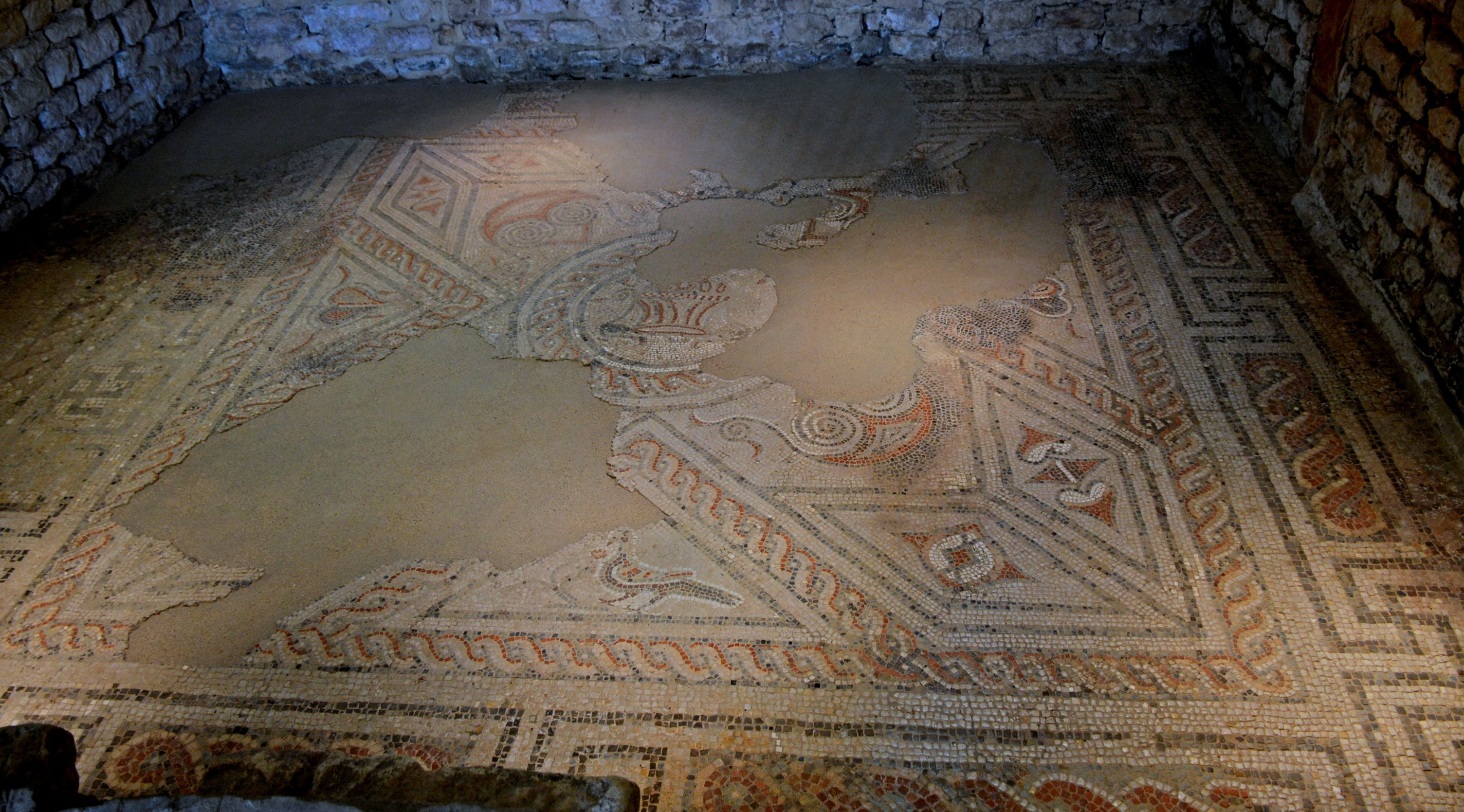
West Bath mosaic

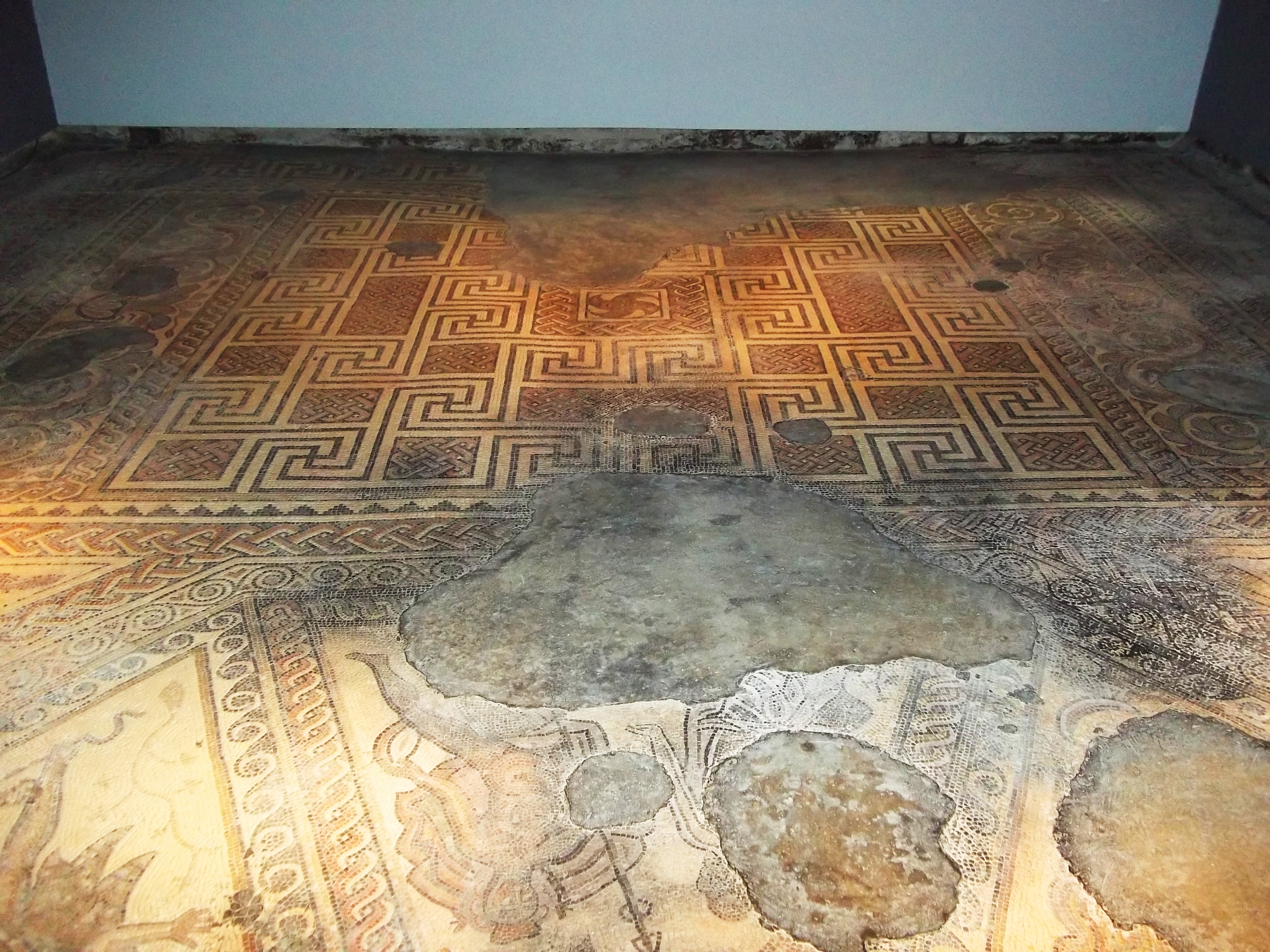
Triclinium mosaic

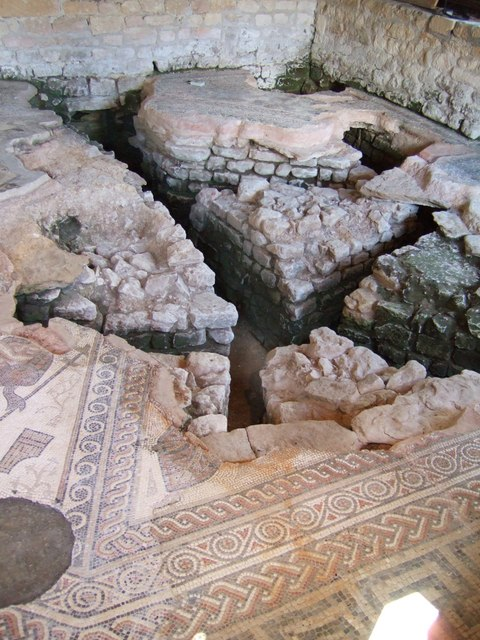
Hypocaust room 32

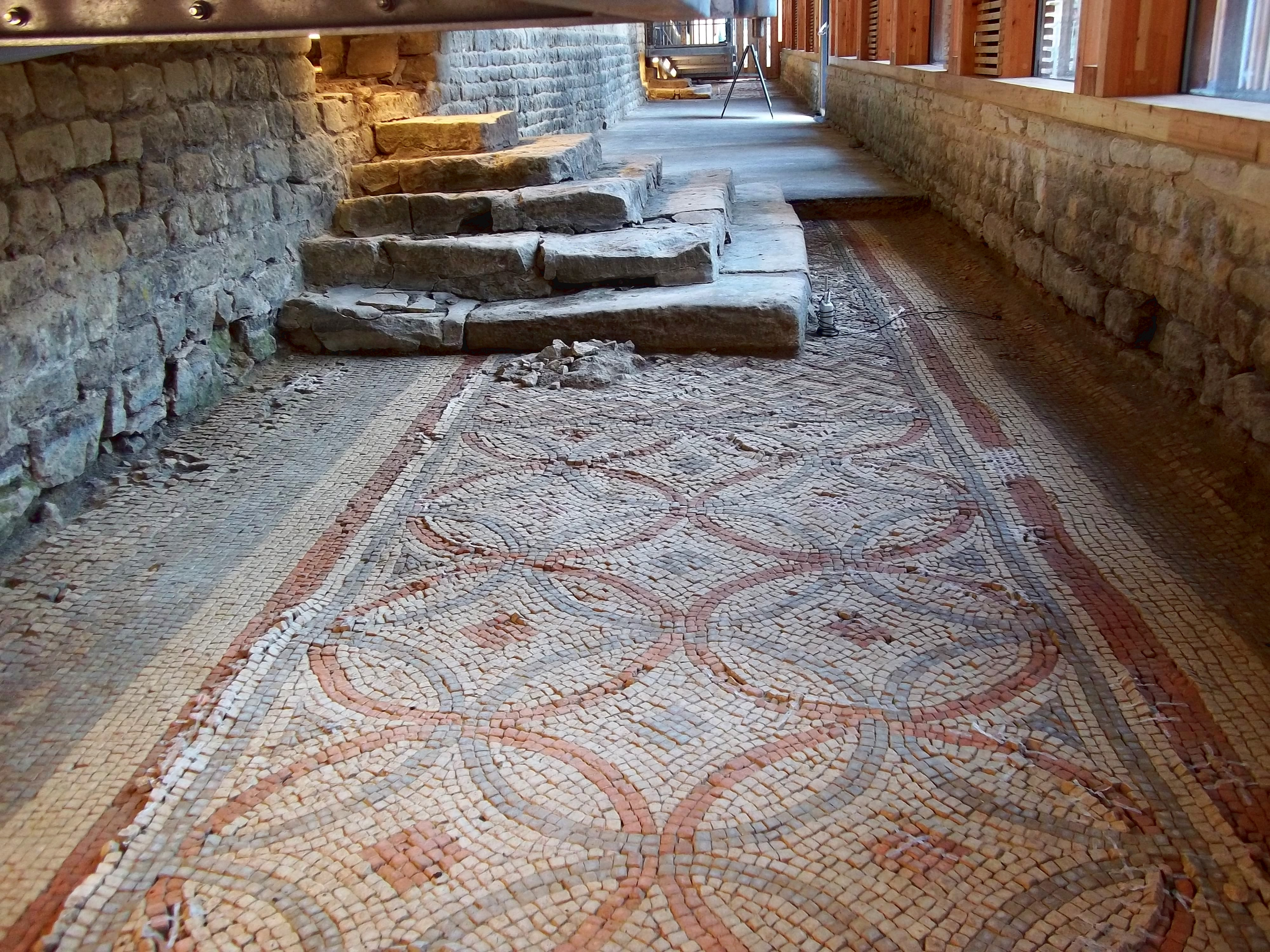
West wing corridor mosaic

== Geometric meander patterns ==
The pavement mosaics in several rooms exhibit the typical geometric meander patterns found in other Roman villas throughout England. The dining room floor contains one of the most elaborate geometric designs found in the villa. Although in good condition, there are substantial portions of it missing. However, a simple mathematical algorithm has been discovered that is able to reconstruct the missing parts of the mosaic from what is still there.

== New building ==
The National Trust considered that Victorian efforts at site conservation were outdated and that the early shelters were not providing sufficient protection. So since 2010 the site has been transformed. They appointed Feilden Clegg Bradley Studios to design a new conservation building as well as a learning facility for the archaeological site. At the same time the reception building was refurbished. The £2.2m project was completed in March 2012.
