= Robert Tempest =

16th century English law enforcement person

Robert Tempest of Holmside Hall was High Sheriff of Durham from 1558-1562.

Tempest was the son of George Tempest and Eleanor, daughter of Robert Millott of Whithill, Durham. In addition to Holmside, the family held lands at Bradley, Mordon, Greatham, Kimblesworth and Potterhouse, all in County Durham.

He was one of the Guardians of the Temporalities of the See of Durham (1560). He and his eldest son Michael were attainted in 1569 for having taken part in the Rising of the North. He was specially named by Thomas Radclyffe, 3rd Earl of Sussex in a proclamation dated Nov. 19, 1569. On the failure of the rebellion he, crossed the border with the Countess of Northumberland into Scotland and on Jan. 7, 1570, was with the Lord of Buccleugh at Branksome.

He and his son Michael embarked from Aberdeen, Aug. 23, 1570 and they were at Louvain in 1571. He died in exile in Brussels whilst planning a second, Spanish-backed invasion.
