= Frederick Beaumont =

British engineer, army officer and politician

Frederick Edward Blackett Beaumont
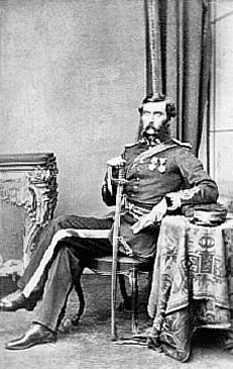
- Born: October 22, 1833
- Died: August 20, 1899 (aged 65)
- Military career
- Allegiance: United Kingdom
- Branch: British Army
- Service years: 1852–1877
- Rank: Colonel
- Unit: Royal Engineers
- Conflicts: Crimean War, Indian Mutiny
- Awards: Indian Mutiny Medal; Turkish Crimean War medal
- Other work: Liberal Member of Parliament for South Durham, 1868–1880

Frederick Edward Blackett Beaumont (22 October 1833 – 20 August 1899) was a British Army officer and politician. A member of the Royal Engineers, he produced several inventions, including a tunnel boring machine which bore his name, and the Beaumont–Adams revolver.

== Early life ==
Beaumont was the son of Edward Blackett Beaumont and Jane Lee. He was born in Darfield, South Yorkshire and educated at the Harrow School, Harrow on the Hill, England.

== Career ==
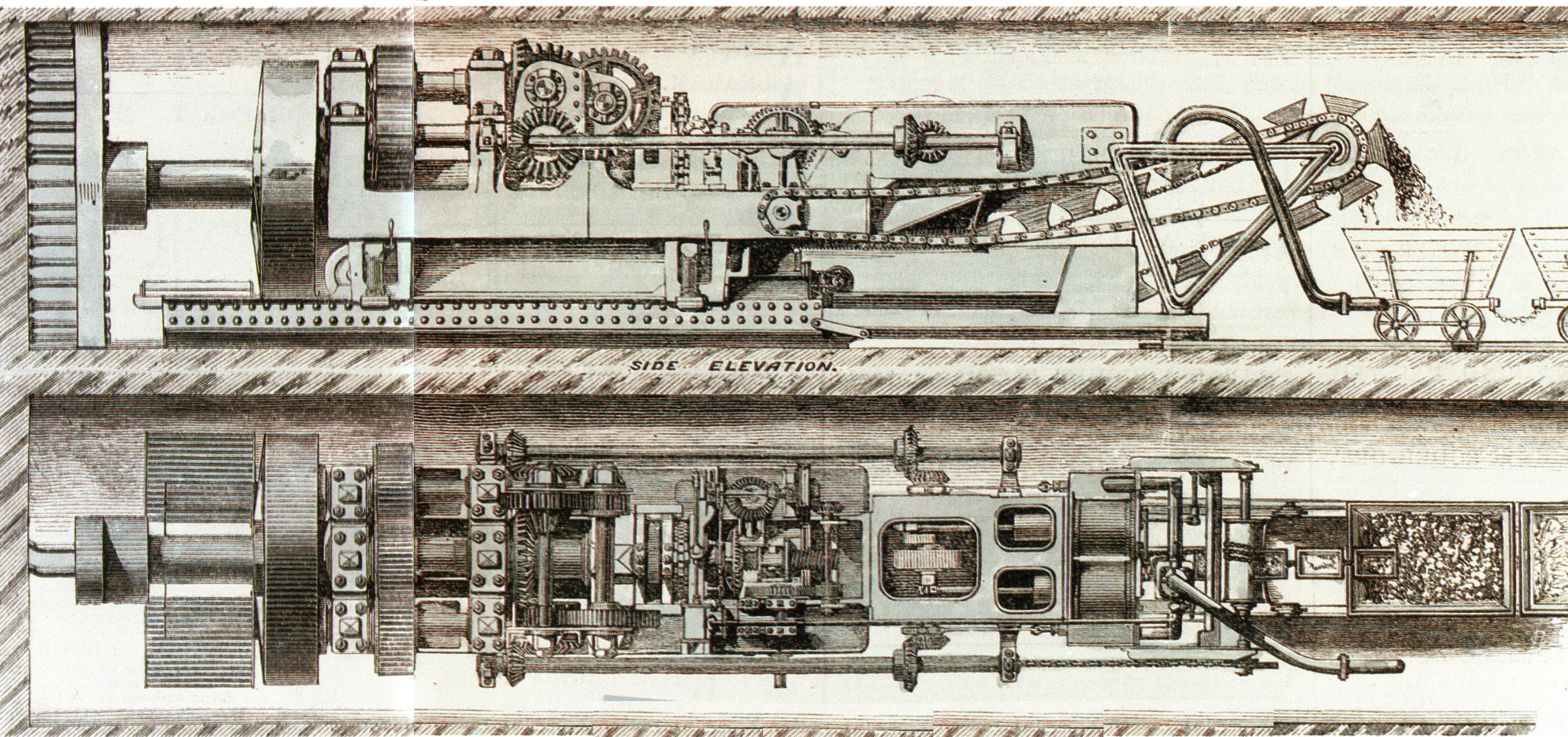
A contemporary plan of a tunnel boring machine from the 1880s on an idea by Colonel Frederick Beaumont and Thomas English. The tunnel boring machine was 9 metres (30 ft) long and was driven with compressed air.

Beaumont served in the Royal Engineers and was a contemporary of General Charles George Gordon; his name appeared directly before Gordon's in the Army Lists from the date of their first commissioning on 23 June 1852.

As a lieutenant, Beaumont saw service during the Crimean War, and was one of only a small number of British officers who served with Turkish forces along the Danube, serving with the (local) rank of Captain in the Turkish Contingent Engineers, for which service he was awarded the Turkish Crimean War medal rather than the British Crimean War Medal.

In 1858, Beaumont again saw action in the Indian Mutiny, during which he served on the staff of the Royal Engineers, distinguishing himself on 14 March 1858 at Lucknow and being awarded the Indian Mutiny Medal with clasp.

Promoted to captain in 1866, Beaumont in conjunction with Captain F.E. Grover made efforts to get ballooning adopted by the British Army, Beaumont having witnessed the use of balloons in the American Civil War.

Beaumont was promoted to major in 1872, and in 1873 was placed in charge of railways at the Royal Arsenal, Woolwich. While in the post he worked on methods for generating hydrogen for balloon experiments and was described by his contemporaries as "a man of remarkably inventive talent."

In 1875, Beaumont filed a patent for a pneumatic tunnelling machine which could cut through chalk at the rate of 200 yards per week. After further development of this design with Captain Thomas English, two Beaumont-English tunnelling machines were adopted for use by Edward Watkin in his attempt to dig a Channel Tunnel in 1880. By the time the project was stopped in early 1882, the two machines had successfully bored over 3,000 yards under the Channel without difficulty.

In 1868, Beaumont was elected one of the two Liberal Members of Parliament for South Durham, a seat he held until 1880.

Beaumont retired from the Army shortly after his promotion to Colonel in 1877, and died on 20 August 1899.

== See also ==
- John Hick

Parliament of the United Kingdom
Preceded by Joseph Whitwell Pease; Charles Freville Surtees	Member of Parliament for South Durham; 1868 – 1880; With: Joseph Whitwell Pease	Succeeded by Joseph Whitwell Pease; Hon. Frederick William Lambton
