= Henry Cowper (died 1887) =

British politician

Henry Frederick Cowper (18 April 1836 – 10 November 1887) was a British Liberal Party politician.

Cowper was the second son of George Cowper, 6th Earl Cowper, and his wife Anne (later 6th Baroness Lucas of Crudwell), daughter of Thomas de Grey, 2nd Earl de Grey. Francis Cowper, 7th Earl Cowper, was his elder brother. He entered the House of Commons as one of three representatives for Hertfordshire in 1865, a seat he held until the constituency was abolished in 1885. He fought the new seat of Hertford but was unsuccessful.

Cowper died in November 1887, aged 51.

== See also ==
- Earl Cowper

Parliament of the United Kingdom
Preceded by Sir Edward Bulwer-Lytton; Abel Smith; Henry Surtees	Member of Parliament for Hertfordshire; 1865–1885; With: Sir Edward Bulwer-Lytton 1865–1866; Henry Surtees 1865–1868; Abel Smith 1866–1885; Henry Brand 1868–1874; Frederick Halsey 1874–1885	Constituency abolished
