= Redworth =

Village in County Durham, England

Coordinates: 54°36′20″N 1°37′44″W

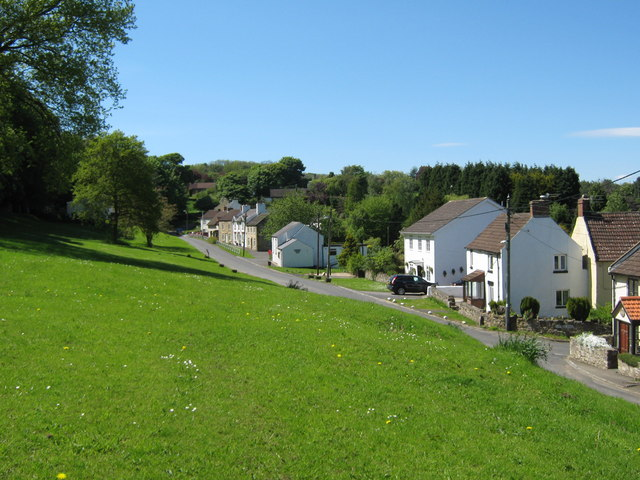

- Location within County Durham
- Civil parish: Heighington
- Unitary authority: Darlington
- Ceremonial county: Durham
- Region: North East
- Country: England
- Sovereign state: United Kingdom
- Police: Durham
- Fire: County Durham and Darlington
- Ambulance: North East

Redworth is a village in the civil parish of Heighington in the borough of Darlington and the ceremonial county of Durham, England. It is west of Newton Aycliffe being situated between Darlington and Shildon.

The name Redworth originates from the words Reed Worth, as the area was a large marsh.

Redworth is home to Barcelo Redworth Hall, a 4 star hotel, which has been visited by many famous figures, including the England football team. Redworth Wood is filled with protected trees, and even a Stone Age fort, which has been pictured in the Northern Echo.

== Civil parish ==
Redworth was formerly a township in the parish of Heighington. From 1866 Redworth was a civil parish in its own right, but from 1 April 1937 the parish was abolished and merged with Heighington with part also going to Shildon. In 1931 the parish had a population of 374.
