= Horsley Hall =

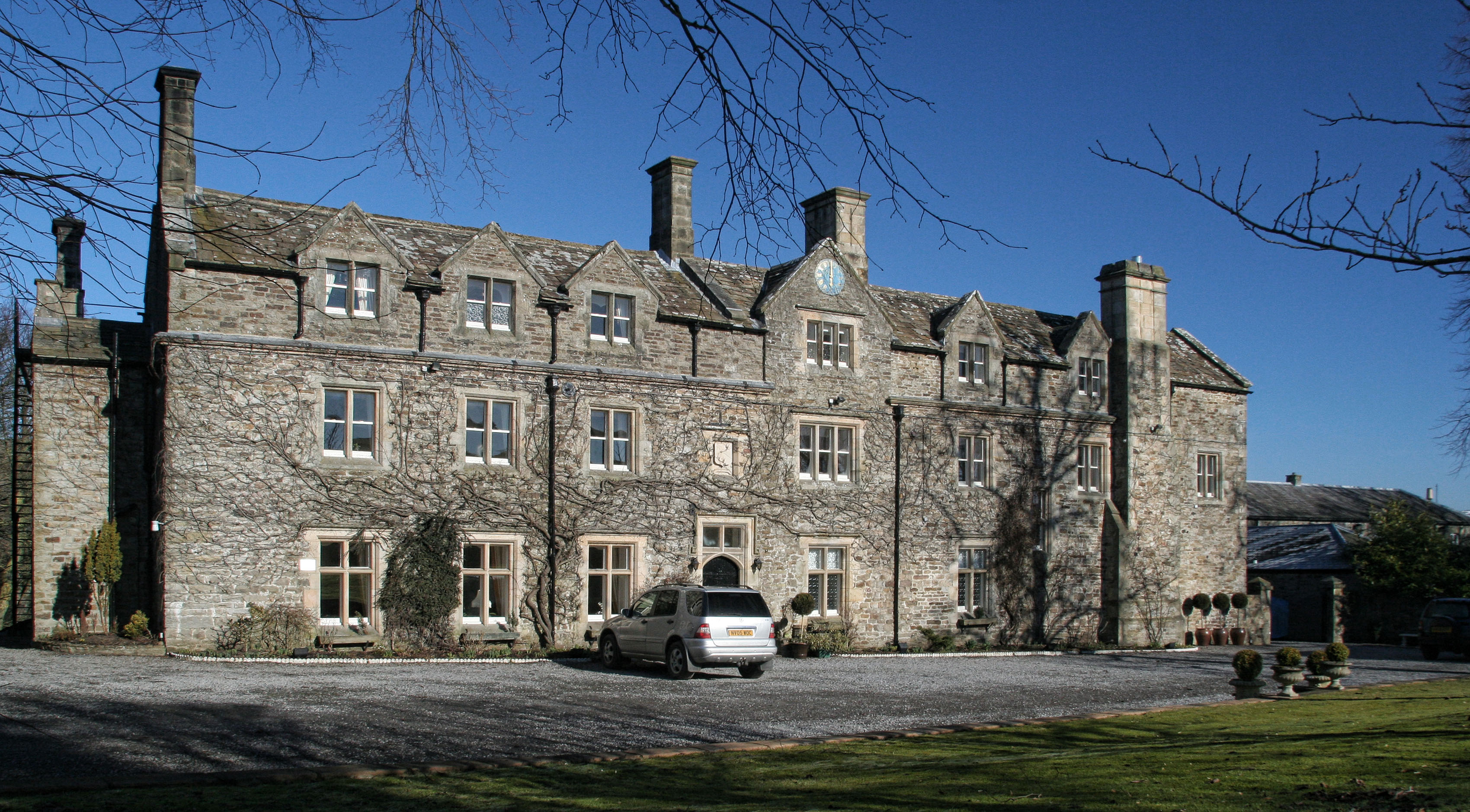
- Horsley Hall, 2010

- Location in County Durham

General information
- Location: County Durham, England, UK
- Coordinates: 54.741°N 2.056°W
- OS grid: NY965385

Horsley Hall is a 17th-century country house, now in use as a hotel, near Stanhope, County Durham, England. It is a Grade II listed building.

The farmhouse at Horsley was part of the estate purchased in 1808 by the Reverend Henry Hildyard of Stokesley Manor House, a member of a junior branch of the Hildyards of Winestead, Yorkshire (see Hildyard Baronets). John Richard Westgarth Hale inherited the estate from his uncle Col. Robert Hildyard of Stokesley, changed his name by Deed Poll to Hildyard and bought the Hutton Bonville estate from the Beresford-Pierce family, employing the architect Anthony Salvin to convert the farmhouse at Horsley into a 17th-century-style manor house for use as a 'shooting box' for the grouse shooting season. The outbuildings included game larders, gun room, laundry, lamp room, stables, harness room, blacksmiths forge and carpenter's workshop. Westernhope Moor was part of the estate, and other grouse moors were rented.

Several members of the Hildyard family served as High Sheriff of Durham in 1850, 1863, 1900 and 1947.

The Hildyards sold the estate in 1954 and moved to Yorkshire. Horsley Hall was purchased for £800 by a former Under Gardener who bricked up the servants' quarters and kept pigs in half the house, after which it was acquired by a builder who salvaged architectural elements from his demolition contracts to add features to the house: a clock in one of the gables, and notably a large complete panelled dining room which replaced the original, necessitating removal of the existing main staircase. Eventually the house was converted into a hotel, then a riding school or stud, and finally converted back into an upmarket hotel.

== The Hildyard family ==
The Reverend Henry Hildyard (1752–1832) acquired Horsley Hall in the early 19th Century. He had inherited the estates of his maternal uncle Henry Thorpe of Bishop Auckland who died a bachelor in 1779. One of the estates that he inherited was the Manor House in Stokesley. In 1780 he married Phyllis Ann Westgarth (1752–1817) who was the daughter and coheiress of John Westgarth of Unthank Hall in Stanhope. Unthank Hall was brought into the Hildyard family. When Henry died in 1832 his son Robert Hildyard inherited Horsley Hall.

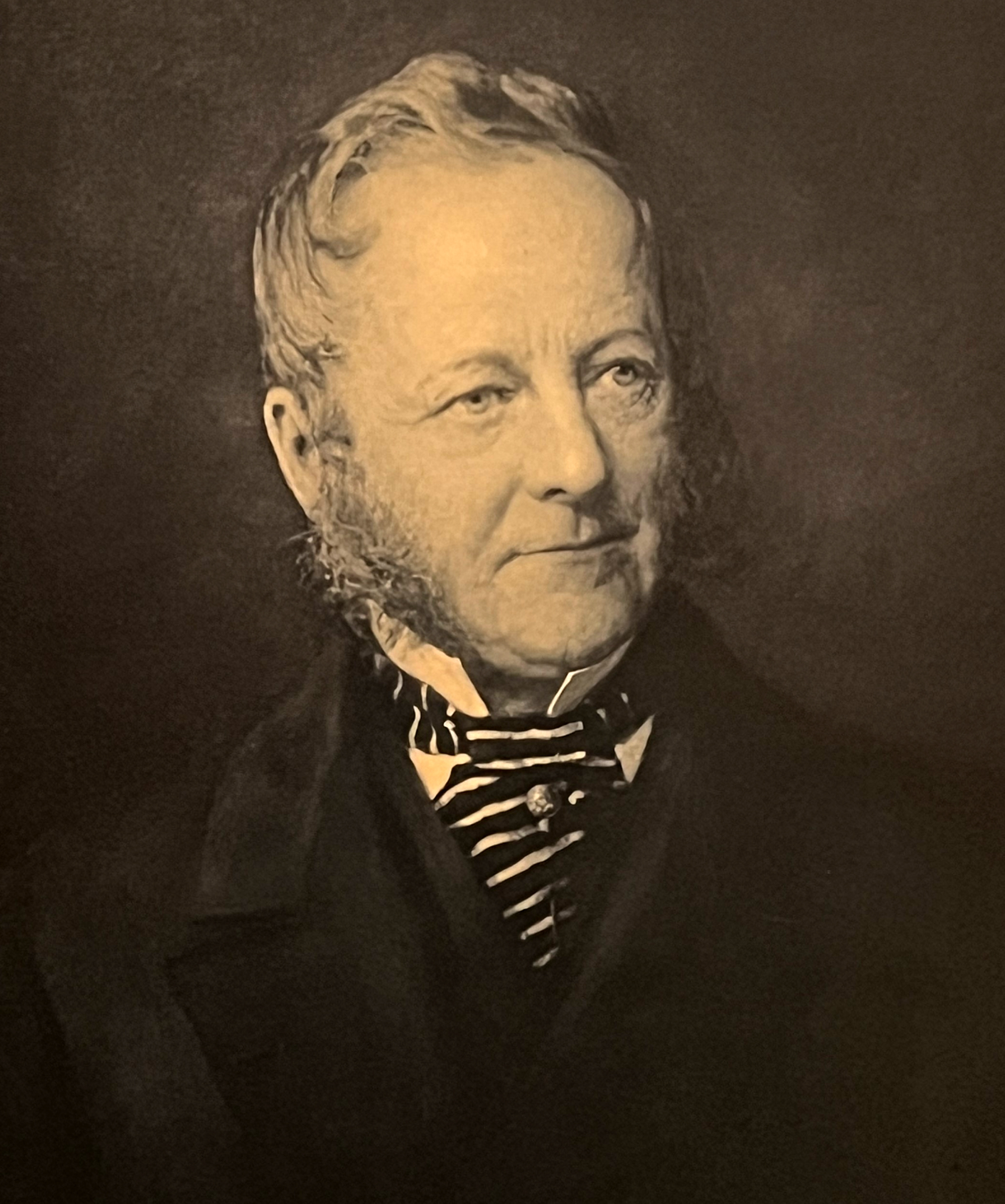
John Richard Westgarth Hildyard in about 1850

Robert Hildyard (1787–1854) was the High Sheriff for Durham. He did not marry so when he died in 1854, Stokesley Manor House and estates, as part of a marriage settlement, passed to the Wynne-Griffiths family, but the estates in Weardale were left to his nephew John Richard Westgarth Hale (1813–1888) who changed his surname from Hale to Hildyard when he inherited his uncle's estates.

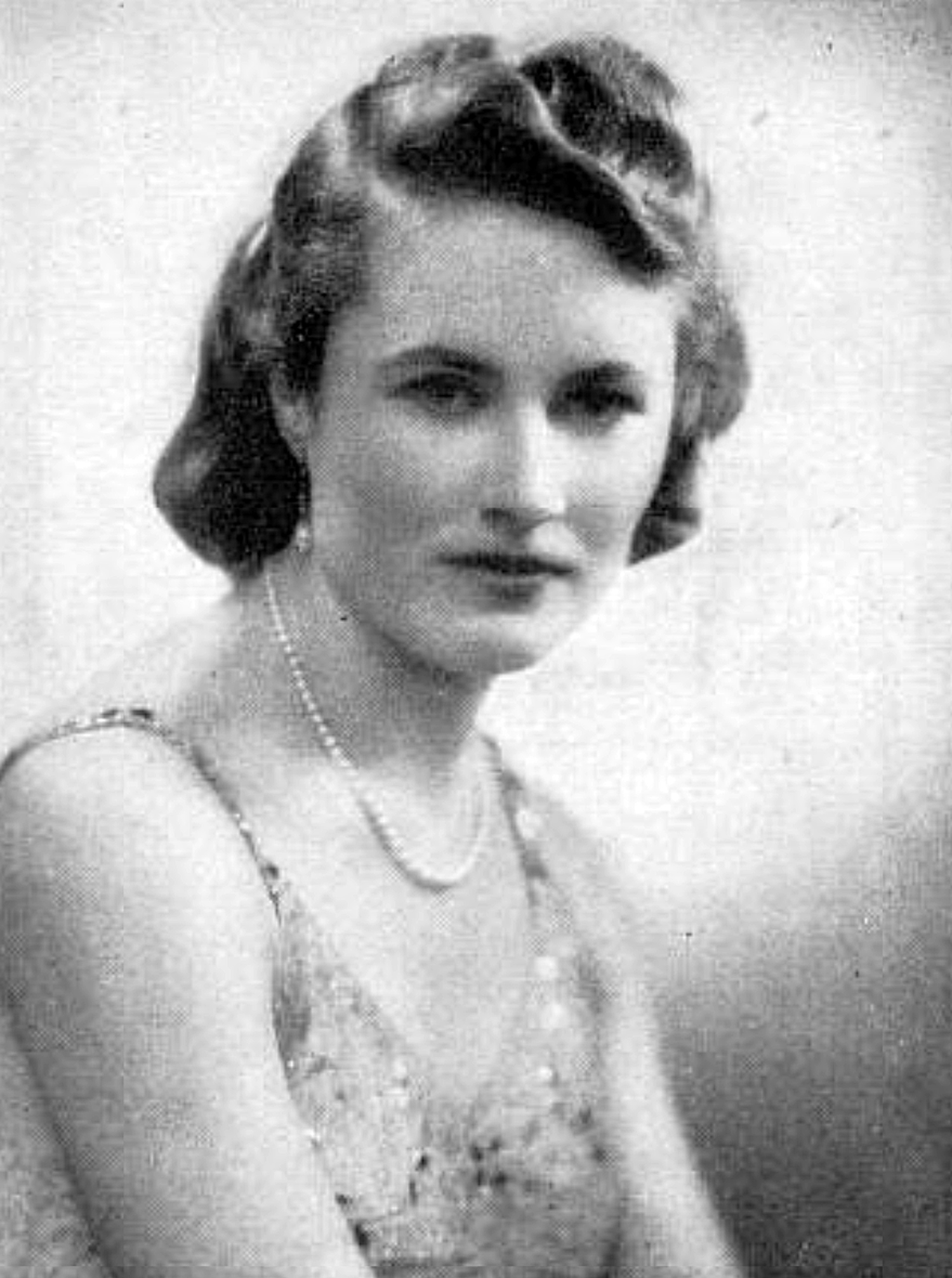
Pauline Mansel Morgan, wife of Edward John Westgarth Hildyard in 1939

John Richard Westgarth Hildyard (1813–1888) was a barrister. In 1860 he married Mary Blanch Neave (1831–1916) who was the daughter of Sir Richard Digby Neave. The couple had three sons and six daughters. In 1859 he bought the Hutton Bonville estate from the Beresford-Pierce family and after Horsley was rebuilt in the 1860s as a large 'shooting box', the family alternated their households between the two residences. He was responsible for the construction of All Saints Church in Eastgate in 1888. When he died in 1888 his eldest son John Arundell Hildyard became the owner of the hall.

John Arundell Hildyard (1861–1935) did not marry so when he died in 1935 in accordance with his father's will he was succeeded by his brother Edward Digby Hildyard (1864–1940). Edward married in 1910 Helen Lucy Egerton (1872–1966). Their only son Edward John Westgarth Hildyard (1913–1964). He married Pauline Emily Gwyneth Mansel Morgan (1917–1994) in 1939. She was the only daughter of Arden Henry William Llewelyn Morgan of Anglesey. The couple and their sons Edward Martin and Robert (Robin) John Chandos lived at the Hall until 1954 when they sold the estate and purchased (for £5,000) Middleton Hall in Pickering Yorkshire which finally passed out of the Hildyard family in 1996.
