= Sir Joseph Pease, 1st Baronet =

British Liberal politician (1828–1903)

Sir Joseph Pease Bt

Member of Parliament for Barnard Castle
- In office 1885–1903
- Preceded by: New constituency
- Succeeded by: Arthur Henderson

Member of Parliament for South Durham
- In office 1865–1885 Serving with Charles Surtees (1865–1868); Frederick Beaumont (1868–1880); Frederick Lambton (1880–1885)
- Preceded by: Henry Pease; James Farrer
- Succeeded by: Constituency abolished

Personal details
- Born: 23 June 1828
- Died: 23 June 1903 (aged 75) Falmouth, Cornwall
- Party: Liberal Party

Sir Joseph Whitwell Pease, 1st Baronet (23 June 1828 – 23 June 1903) was a British Liberal Party politician who sat in the House of Commons from 1865 to 1903.

== Biography ==
Pease was a member of the Darlington Pease family, being the son of Joseph Pease and his wife Emma Gurney, daughter of Joseph Gurney of Lakenham Grove, Norwich. His father was a Quaker industrialist and railway pioneer of Darlington, and M.P. for South Durham from 1832 to 1841. Pease was educated at the Quaker run Lawrence Street school in York, (which later became Bootham School).

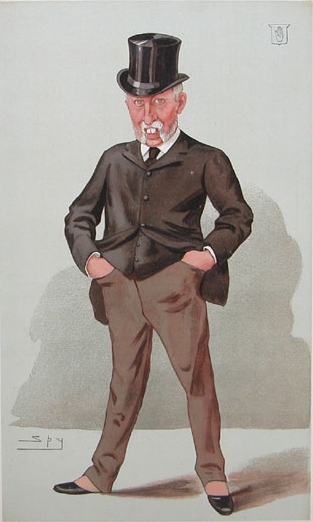
"Peace" Pease as caricatured by Spy (Leslie Ward) in Vanity Fair, October 1887

He was a banker, an owner of coal and ironstone mines in Durham and Yorkshire, and a director of numerous companies, including the family's original woollen mill business Henry Pease & Co., the family bank J & JW Pease, The Owners of the Middlesbrough Estate, the locomotive manufacturers Robert Stephenson and Company, and the North Eastern Railway of which he became chairman.

He was a J.P. for Durham and a Deputy Lieutenant, J.P. for the North Riding of Yorkshire, President of the Peace Society, President of the Society for the Suppression of the Opium Trade, and a campaigner against capital punishment. He was President of the Bootham School Old Scholars Association (BOSA) from 1879 until his death in 1903.

At the 1865 general election Pease was elected Member of Parliament for South Durham. He held the seat until it was reorganised under the Redistribution of Seats Act 1885. He was created a baronet of Hutton Lowcross and Pinchinthorpe in 1882, the first Quaker to accept an honour from the state, and in 1894 was offered a peerage by Gladstone, but expressing his indifference left the decision to his eldest son Alfred, who let the matter lapse. At the 1885 general election he was elected MP for Barnard Castle. He held the seat until his death in 1903.

In his capacity as President of the Society for the Suppression of the Opium Trade, Pease attempted to pass a motion in the House of Commons in 1891 to declare the opium trade "morally indefensible" and remove Government support for it. The motion failed to pass (despite majority support in the House) due to an amendment calling for compensation to India, but it brought the anti-opium campaign into the public eye and increased opposition to the trade.

Towards the end of his life, Pease's businesses had problems and in 1902 the Pease Bank failed. He was forced to sell much of his art collection. He died the following year at home in Falmouth, Cornwall on his 75th birthday.

== Family ==
Pease married Mary Fox, daughter of Alfred Fox of the Fox family of Falmouth on 23 August 1854. They had six daughters and two sons: Alfred Edward Pease, 2nd Bt and Joseph Albert "Jack" Pease, 1st Baron Gainford.

== See also ==
- List of political families in the United Kingdom

== Bibliography ==
- Smith, Charlotte Fell (1912). "Pease, Joseph Whitwell" . In Lee, Sidney (ed.). Dictionary of National Biography (2nd supplement). Vol. 3. London: Smith, Elder & Co.
- James Stephen Jeans (1875). Pioneers of the Cleveland Iron Trade. H.G. Reid, Gazette Pub. Offices. pp. 128–148.

Parliament of the United Kingdom
Preceded by Henry Pease; James Farrer	Member for South Durham; 1865 – 1885; With: Charles Freville Surtees 1865–1868; Frederick Edward Blackett Beaumont 1868–1880; Frederick William Lambton 1880–1885	Constituency abolished
New constituency	Member for Barnard Castle; 1885 – 1903	Succeeded by Arthur Henderson
Baronetage of the United Kingdom
New creation	Baronet (of Hutton Lowcross and Pinchinthorpe); 1882–1903	Succeeded by Alfred Edward Pease
Business positions
Preceded by John Dent Dent	Chairman of the North Eastern Railway; 1895–1902	Succeeded by Viscount Ridley
