= Redworth Hall =

The Redworth Hall Hotel
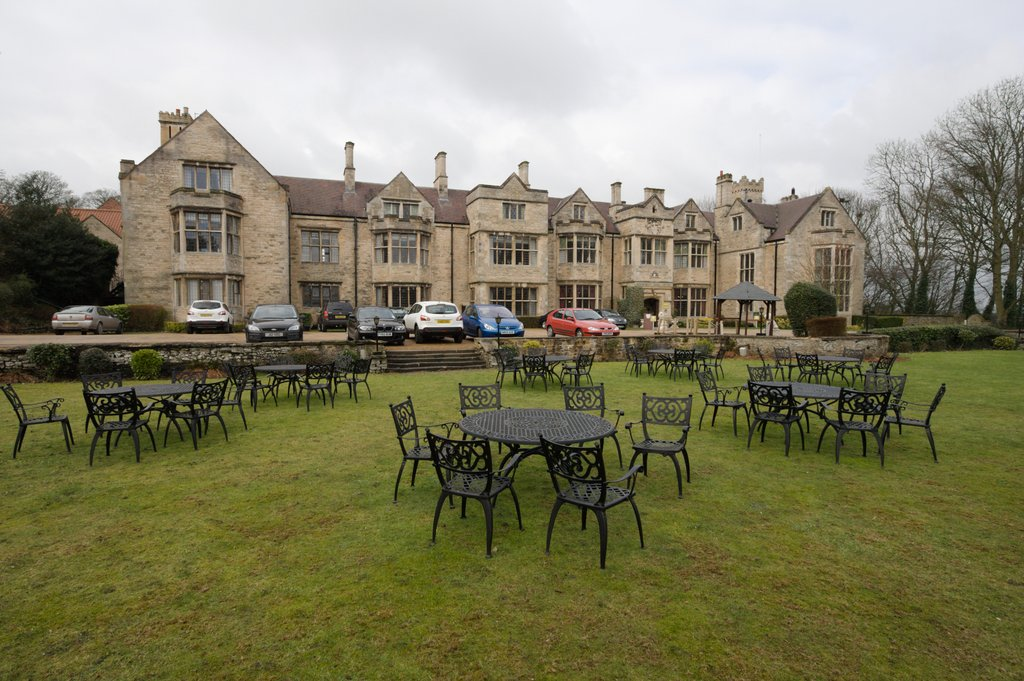

- Location in County Durham

General information
- Location: County Durham, England, UK
- Coordinates: 54.603°N 1.632°W
- OS grid: NZ239231

Redworth Hall is a 17th-century country house at Redworth, Heighington, County Durham, England now converted to a hotel. It is a listed building.

== History ==
The present Redworth Hall was built in 1693 by George and Eleanor Crosier. There is a memorial inscription in nearby Heighington Church in their honour. George Crosier (1637-1717) was the son of a wealthy landowner. He married Eleanor Harrison, daughter of John Harrison of Sunderland and had five daughters who were his co-heirs. Their youngest daughter Jane Crosier (1671-1710) who married Edward Surtees (1663-1744) brought Redworth Hall into the Surtees family.

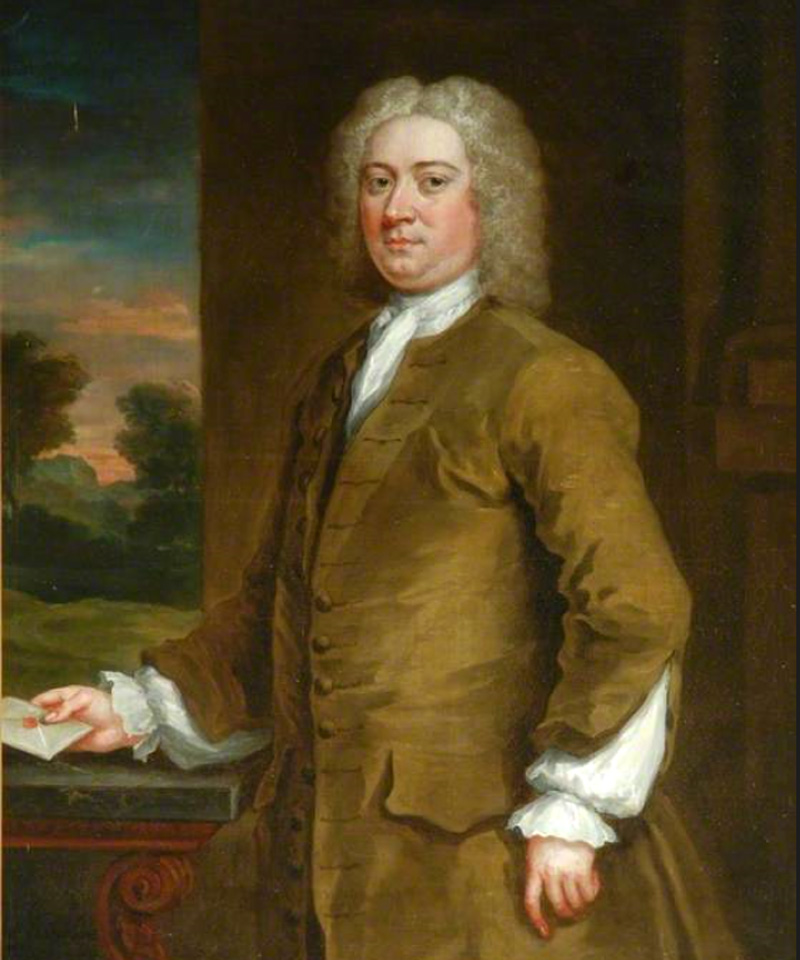
Robert Surtees (1694-1785)

Their eldest son Robert Surtees (1694-1785) was the owner of Redworth Hall for forty years. In 1744 he married Dorothy Lambton, second daughter of Thomas Lambton of Hardwick. In the same year as his marriage Robert made substantial alterations and additions to the Hall and added a rear wing.

The couple had two daughters Dorothy and Jane. In 1769 Jane married her cousin Lieutenant Crosier Surtees (1740-1803). When her father Robert died in 1785 Redworth Hall was left to Crosier. However Crosier was a drunkard and womaniser and in about 1800 Jane left him. He moved into the house of his mistress in Pennington Rake and had several more children. Suddenly in 1803 he died when he was returning on his horse, in a drunken state from a banquet with Lord Barnard in Raby Castle. On the moors he tumbled from the saddle, fell into the water, and froze to death. In the following year Jane married the Reverend William Sturges of Magdalene College, Cambridge.

Redworth Hall was inherited by Crosier’s eldest son Robert Surtees (1782-1857). In 1811 he married Elizabeth Cookson (1783-1847) and the couple had four children, three sons and a daughter. Their eldest son Robert Lambton Surtees (1812-1863) inherited the house in 1857 but he died six years later in 1863. Because he had not married and had no descendants the property was then passed to his younger brother Henry Edward Surtees.

Henry Edward Surtees (1819-1895) added the Jacobean style spiral stone staircase and galleried Baronial Hall in the early 1890s. In 1843 he married Eliza Snell Chauncey and had two daughters but unfortunately she died in 1857. He then married in 1870 Mary Isabella Adams and had two sons. He was in the 10th Hussars for some years in 1864 was elected as a Member of Parliament. The 1881 Census shows him living at Redworth Hall with his second wife Mary Isabella who is 30 years his junior, three of his younger children, a governess, a ladies maid, a butler, a footman, a nurse and three house servants.

When he died in 1895 the house was inherited by his eldest son Henry Siward Balliol Surtees (1873-1955). In 1898 he married Helen Winifred Muriel Thomson only child of John James Thomson of Camphill, County Renfrew. The couple had a son and two daughters. They divorced in 1909 and Henry later married in 1932 Emma Veronica Cunliffe.

== Present day ==
Following a period of occupation by a residential school the house was converted to a hotel operated by The Hotel Collection.

The building was reputed to be haunted by a child walking along the corridors. Folklore has it that Lord Surtees had his mentally ill child chained to the fireplace whose cries of anguish can still be heard. It also tells the story of the peer's affair with his scullery maid, who committed suicide by throwing herself down the staircase when his wife discovered she was pregnant.
