= Holmside Hall =

Farmhouse and equestrian centre in England

- Location in County Durham

General information
- Location: County Durham, England, UK
- Coordinates: 54.842°N 1.682°W
- OS grid: NZ205497

Holmside Hall is an early 19th-century farmhouse and equestrian centre at Holmside, Burnhope, County Durham, England.

The farm is built on the site of a medieval manor house which until 1570 was the home of Robert Tempest (High Sheriff of Durham in 1561). The family lost the manor by confiscation following his attainder for his part in the Rising of the North in 1569.

The site contains the remains of a medieval moat and the farm outbuildings contain walls and fragments of the medieval manor house. The farmhouse and outbuildings are Grade II listed buildings.

Holmside New Hall, sometimes known as Little Holmside, is a nearby 17th-century house one time home of the Whittingham family.
