= John Bowes (art collector) =

British politician

John Bowes (19 June 1811 London – 9 October 1885 Streatlam, co. Durham) was an English art collector and thoroughbred racehorse owner who founded the Bowes Museum in Barnard Castle, Teesdale.

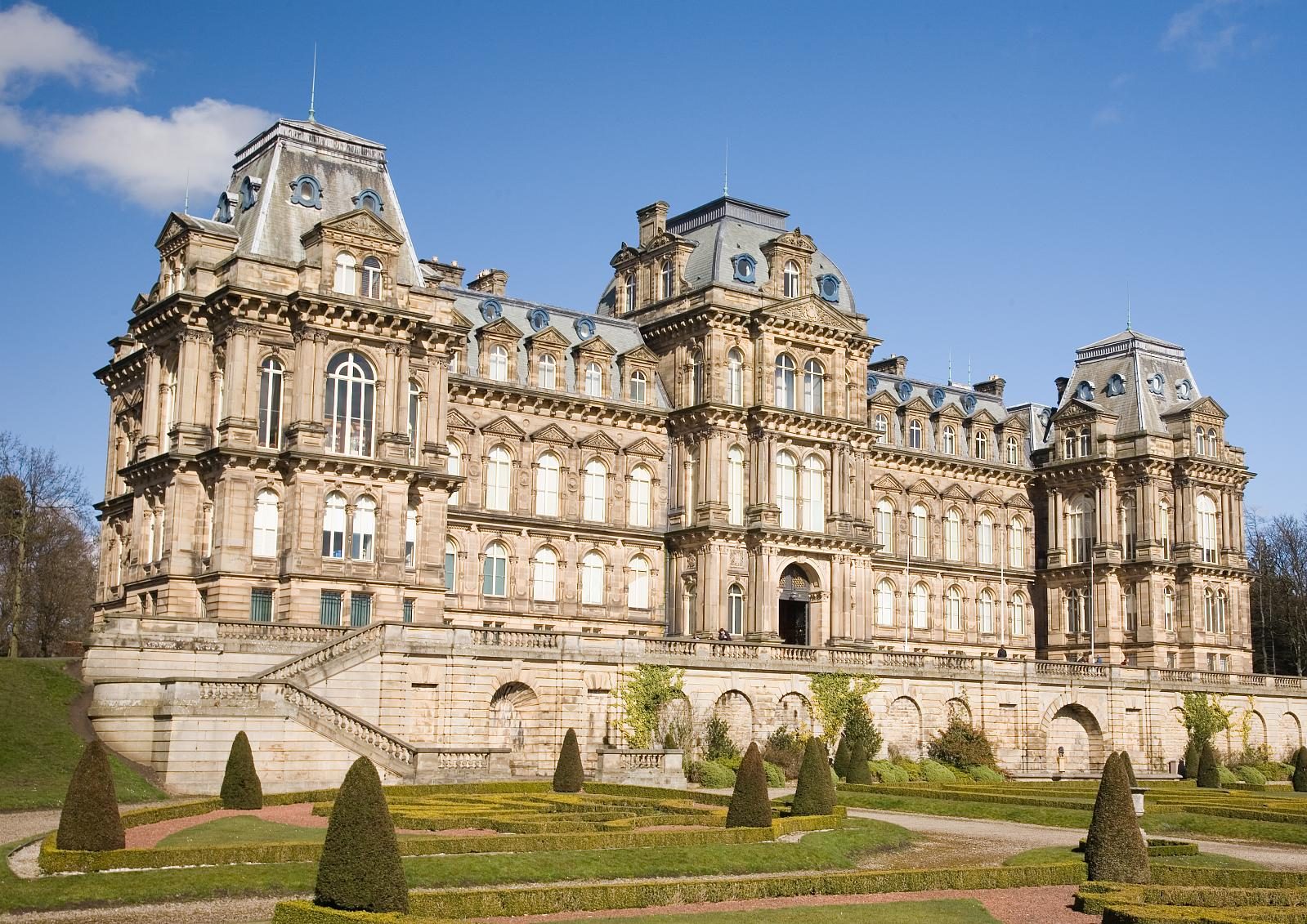
Bowes Museum, County Durham

== Family background ==
Born into the wealthy coal mining descendants of George Bowes, he was the child of John Bowes, 10th Earl of Strathmore and Kinghorne (1769–1820) and his mistress or common-law wife Mary Millner, later wife of Sir William Hutt. His paternal grandmother was Mary Bowes, Countess of Strathmore and Kinghorne.

Because his parents were unmarried at the time of his birth, he did not inherit the Earl of Strathmore and Kinghorne title. All sources describe Bowes as the fully and openly acknowledged son of the 10th Earl.

=== 1820 legitimacy case ===
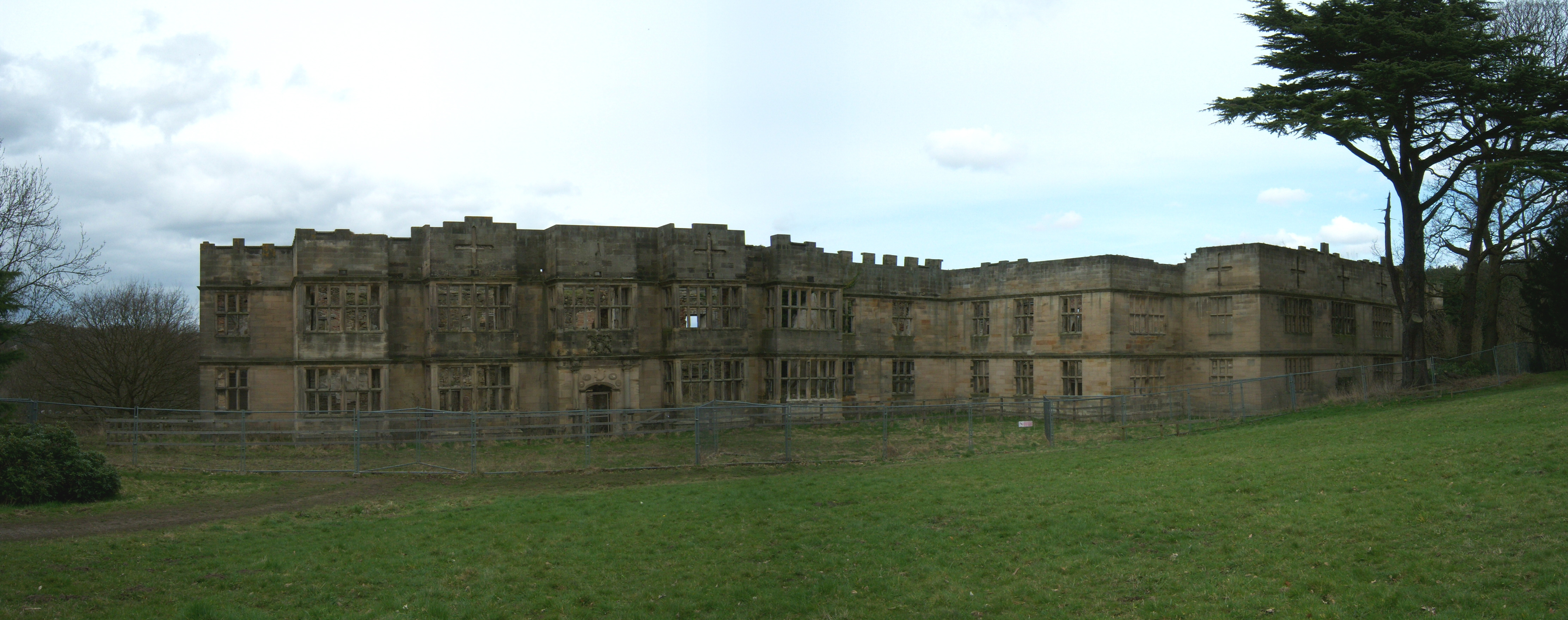
The shell of Gibside Hall, to the south-west of Newcastle upon Tyne

His parents married at St George's, Hanover Square on 2 July 1820, with Lord Barnard, heir to the Earl of Darlington, as witness. Sixteen hours later, his father died.

Bowes's legitimacy was questioned by the 10th Earl's next surviving brother Thomas Bowes, who claimed the earldom and estates for himself. The Scottish courts agreed that the 1820 marriage had taken place, and that it had been between two unmarried persons. However, since his parents were not domiciled in Scotland (the crucial point of the uncle's challenge), he was not legitimated in Scotland. The result was to make John Bowes officially illegitimate under English and Scottish law, which status came to matter more and more in the Victorian mores already coming into effect. A five-year battle ensued over the estates, with the English estates going to John and the Scottish estates going to his uncle, the 11th Earl.

Bowes was raised at Gibside by his mother, now Dowager Countess of Strathmore. In 1831, she married his tutor William Hutt (1791–1882) as his first wife.

== Subsequent career ==
Educated at Eton and Trinity College, Cambridge, John Bowes pursued an interest in theatre, art, and horse racing. A member of the Jockey Club, he owned Streatlam Stud that bred and raised racehorses at Streatlam and Gibside. His stable won the 2,000 Guineas Stakes three times, The Derby four times, and, in capturing the English Triple Crown with West Australian, won the 1853 St. Leger Stakes.

Bowes was a reformer in politics, in favour of triennial Parliaments and the removal of Bishops from the House of Lords. He was a Liberal Party Member of Parliament, for the South Durham constituency, between 1832 and 1847. He also served as High Sheriff of Durham in 1852.

As one of the largest landowners in England, he developed a number of business interests, initially concerning his extensive coal mine holdings. Charles Mark Palmer managed his collieries at Marley Hill and later opened the Palmers Shipbuilding and Iron Company at Jarrow, in which Bowes was a partner. The first major vessel built was the pioneer iron steam collier John Bowes.

John Bowes was Freemason and was admitted as a joining member of Palatine Lodge No. 97, Sunderland, October 1845.

== Marriage ==
Bowes left England for France, allegedly because he was not fully welcome in Victorian society as a person of illegitimate birth. While in Paris, France, John Bowes met the actress Joséphine Benoîte Coffin-Chevallier (1825–1874), daughter of a clockmaker, a woman passionate about painting and collecting. She apparently became his mistress, and they married in 1852. For a time, the couple made their home at the Château du Barry in Louveciennes near Paris. They shared a passion for art and acquired a large collection that would ultimately be housed in the Bowes Museum. In 1868, she became Countess of Montalbo, San Marino. Unfortunately both died before their museum project was completed, Josephine having died in 1874. She had no issue, and was initially buried at Gibside.

== Foundation of the Bowes Museum ==
Joséphine officially laid the foundation stone of the museum on 27 November 1869, but she was apparently too ill to do so physically, and merely touched it with a trowel.

The story of John Bowes is told in the book John Bowes and the Bowes Museum by Charles E Hardy. The book itself has an interesting history. It was first published by the renowned Newcastle upon Tyne publisher Frank Graham in 1970. The second printing in 1978 was again published by Frank Graham, but two subsequent editions, 1982 and 1989, were published by The Friends of Bowes Museum.

== Second marriage and death ==
In 1877 (marriage settlement 24 July 1877), Bowes remarried one Alphonsine Maria St. Amand, divorced wife of the Comte de Courten. The second marriage did not turn out well, and it appears that John Bowes was attempting to obtain a divorce from his wife from March to May 1884. Indeed, it was subsequently reported to have been legally severed in May 1885. Alphonsine may have been mother of the Italian artist Angelo de Courten (1848–1925).

Bowes died childless in October 1885 at Streatlam, and was interred next to his first wife at Gibside. It had been intended that they would be reinterred in a Catholic chapel at the Bowes Museum, this original chapel was not realised; however, a later Catholic church was built on land adjoining the museum grounds in which Bowes and his first wife were reinterred in 1928.

== Will, bequests, and legacy ==
Bowes's will, proven on 28 November 1885, disclosed his immense personal estate to be worth £371,725 1s. 0d (equivalent to £41,298,791 in 2025). He left his wife Alphonsine an annuity of £3000 for life, as well as £20,000. Substantial sums were left to his curator Amelie Basset, and to his three named godchildren. The remainder of his estate, not entailed, was largely devised to the trustees of his first wife's will (registered 1875) for the purposes of setting up the Museum.

By the terms of his father's entailment, his English properties reverted to his legitimate cousins upon his death. Streatlam Castle was eventually sold by the family in 1922 on the eve of the wedding of Lady Elizabeth Bowes-Lyon to the Duke of York, allegedly to pay for the costs of the wedding. It passed through many hands, and was demolished by its new owner Philip Ivan Pease in 1959, but the Pease family retains the lands till date. The Gibside estate is now owned by the National Trust.

John Bowes is best remembered today as the founder of the Bowes Museum, which has been described as the Wallace Collection of the North.

== Notes ==
Parliament of the United Kingdom
| New constituency | Member for South Durham; 1832 – 1847; With: Joseph Pease 1832–41; Lord Harry George Vane 1841–47 | Succeeded by James Farrer; Lord Harry George Vane |
