= Heighington Church of England Primary School =

Coordinates: 54.597°N 1.621°W

Location
- Hopelands; Heighington, County Durham, DL5 6PH; England

Information
- Type: Academy
- Religious affiliation: Church of England
- Department for Education URN: 137022 Tables
- Ofsted: Reports
- Headteacher: Mrs C. Stonier
- Gender: Mixed
- Age: 4 to 11
- Enrolment: 279
- Website: http://www.br-and-h.org.uk/

Heighington CE Primary School is a Church of England primary school with academy status located in the village of Heighington, near Newton Aycliffe, County Durham. As of 2016 it educated 279 pupils aged 4–11. At its Ofsted inspection in 2019, it was classed as a ‘good’ school. The headmaster since 1995 has been Neil Parker.

== Premises ==
The premises were extended between 2000 and 2004 with new classrooms and additional administrative space. There was significant local opposition to this expansion on the grounds that children from outside the area would be attracted and this would increase traffic. The plans went ahead despite letters of objection and a petition submitted to the council.

== Church bells project ==
Sponsored by BT, in 2004 the school undertook a project to research the origins of the St Michael's Church bells and produced a DVD and book multimedia package.

== School awards ==
- Artsmark award
- Healthy Schools award
- Sports Active award

== Faculty awards ==
- Neil Parker won the North-East 2002 Leadership Trust Award for School Leadership.

== Notable former pupils ==
- Mark Gatiss, actor
