= James Farrer (British politician) =

James Farrer (8 May 1812 – 13 June 1879) was a Conservative Party politician in England who was elected three times as Member of Parliament (MP) for South Durham.

He unsuccessfully contested the 1841 general election, but was elected unopposed in 1847 after John Bowes stepped down. He was re-elected unopposed in 1852, but in 1857 he lost his seat to the Liberal candidate, Henry Pease.

When the Liberal Lord Harry George Vane stepped down at the 1859 general election, Farrer was again elected unopposed. He retired from politics at the 1865 general election.

== Archaeology ==
James Farrer was a member of the Society of Antiquaries of Scotland and of the Society of Antiquaries of London. His excavations included: a partial excavation of brochs on Orkney from 1853; the opening of Maeshowe in July 1861; and the first excavation of Chedworth Roman Villa, from 1864 to 1866.

Parliament of the United Kingdom
Preceded by John Bowes; Lord Harry George Vane	Member of Parliament for South Durham; 1847 – 1857; With: Lord Harry George Vane	Succeeded by Lord Harry George Vane; Henry Pease
Preceded by Henry Pease; Lord Harry George Vane	Member of Parliament for South Durham; 1859 – 1865; With: Henry Pease	Succeeded by Joseph Whitwell Pease; Charles Freville Surtees
