= Joseph Pease (railway pioneer) =

English railway pioneer (1799–1872)

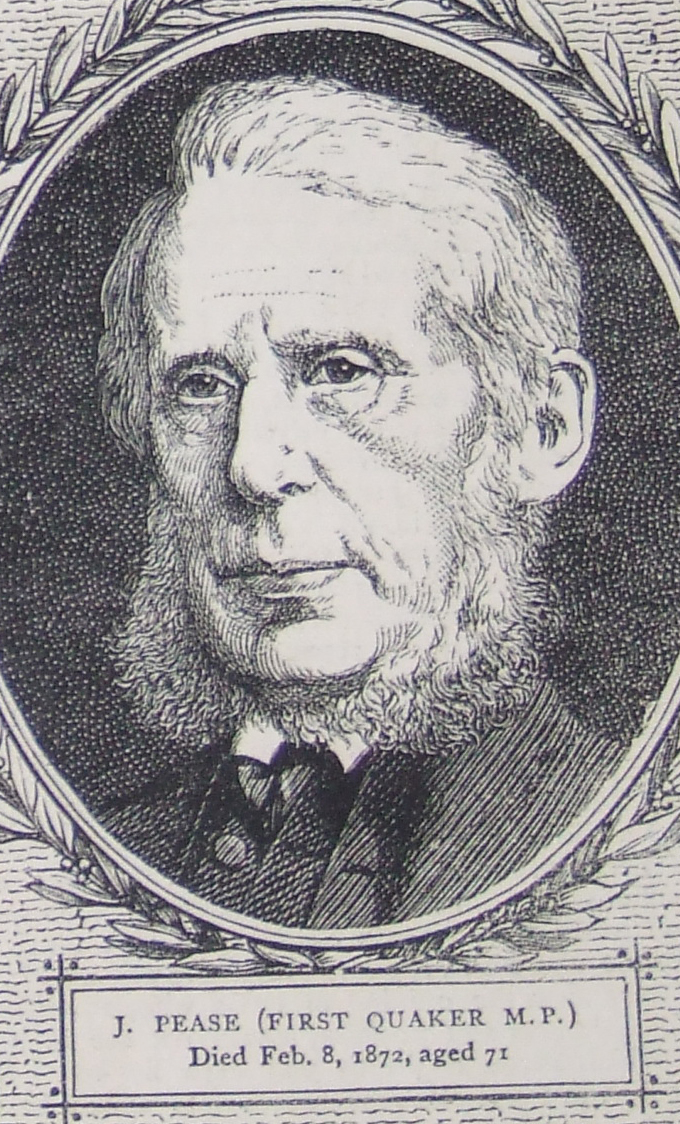
Joseph Pease

Joseph Pease (22 June 1799 – 8 February 1872) was a British proponent and supporter of the Stockton and Darlington Railway Company, one of first public railway systems in the world, and was the first Quaker permitted to take his seat in Parliament.

== Life ==
Joseph Pease joined his father Edward and other members of the Pease family in starting the Stockton and Darlington Company. In 1826 he married Emma Gurney, youngest daughter of Joseph Gurney of Norwich. They had twelve children, amongst whom, were Sir Joseph Whitwell Pease, his eldest son, and Arthur Pease (1837-1898), his fourth son. Joseph's fifth child, Elizabeth Lucy Pease, married the agricultural engineer and inventor John Fowler, a pioneer in the application of steam power to agriculture.

In 1829 Pease was managing the Stockton and Darlington Railway in place of his father. In 1830, he bought a sufficient number of the collieries in the area, to become the largest owner of collieries in South Durham. That same year, along with his father-in-law Joseph Gurney of Norfolk, and other Quaker businessmen, they bought a large tract of land at Middlesbrough, which they projected as a port for exporting coal. In December 1830, a new railway line was opened on the Stockton and Darlington railway, to Middlesbrough, for transporting the coal to the new port. In addition to collieries, he was interested in quarries and ironstone mines in Durham and North Yorkshire, as well as in cotton and woollen manufactures, and he was active in educational and philanthropic work.

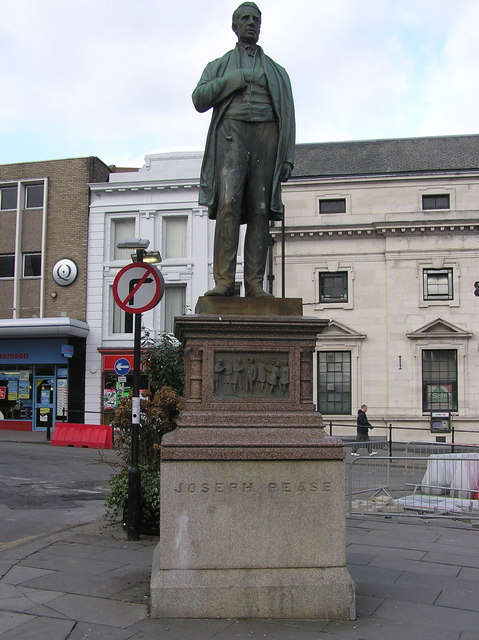
Statue of Pease in Darlington town centre

In 1832, Pease was elected Member of Parliament for South Durham. As a Quaker, he was not immediately allowed to take his seat, because he refused to take the oath of office. A special committee considered the question and decided that Pease could affirm, rather than swear and thus, he was allowed to take his seat in Parliament, the first Quaker so to do. He was also unusual, in that, like most Quakers of the day, he refused to remove his hat, even when he entered the House of Commons.

Pease introduced as a bill the Cruelty to Animals Act 1835, being a member of the committee of the Society for the Prevention of Cruelty to Animals. The law was passed in part due to lobbying by the Society (founded 1824, since 1840 the RSPCA). The 1835 Act amended the existing legislation to prohibit the keeping of premises for the purpose of staging the baiting of bulls, dogs, bears, badgers or "other Animal (whether of domestic or wild Nature or Kind)". The Act also banned (but failed to eradicate) dog fighting and cockfighting.

Pease supported the Whig governments of Earl Grey and Lord Melbourne. He joined Thomas Fowell Buxton in the anti-slavery movement. He supported the removal of bishops from the House of Lords. He was also in favour of shorter Parliaments and the secret ballot. He retired from politics in 1841.

In 1860, Pease became the president of the Peace Society, a post he held until his death.

He wrote a poem in praise of Newington Academy for Girls, founded by Quaker scientist and abolitionist, William Allen.

Like his father before him, he is buried at the Friends Burial Ground, Skinnergate, Darlington, County Durham.

A statue to Joseph Pease stands at the junction of High Row and Bondgate, in the centre of Darlington. It was unveiled in 1875, to mark the golden jubilee of the opening of the Stockton and Darlington Railway.

Joseph Pease also paid for the building of the Clock Tower in Darlington as a gift to Darlington.

== See also ==
- List of political families in the United Kingdom

Parliament of the United Kingdom
New constituency	Member of Parliament for South Durham; 1832 – 1841; With: John Bowes	Succeeded by Lord Harry Vane; John Bowes
