= St Michael's Church, Heighington =

Coordinates: 54.5959°N 1.6161°W

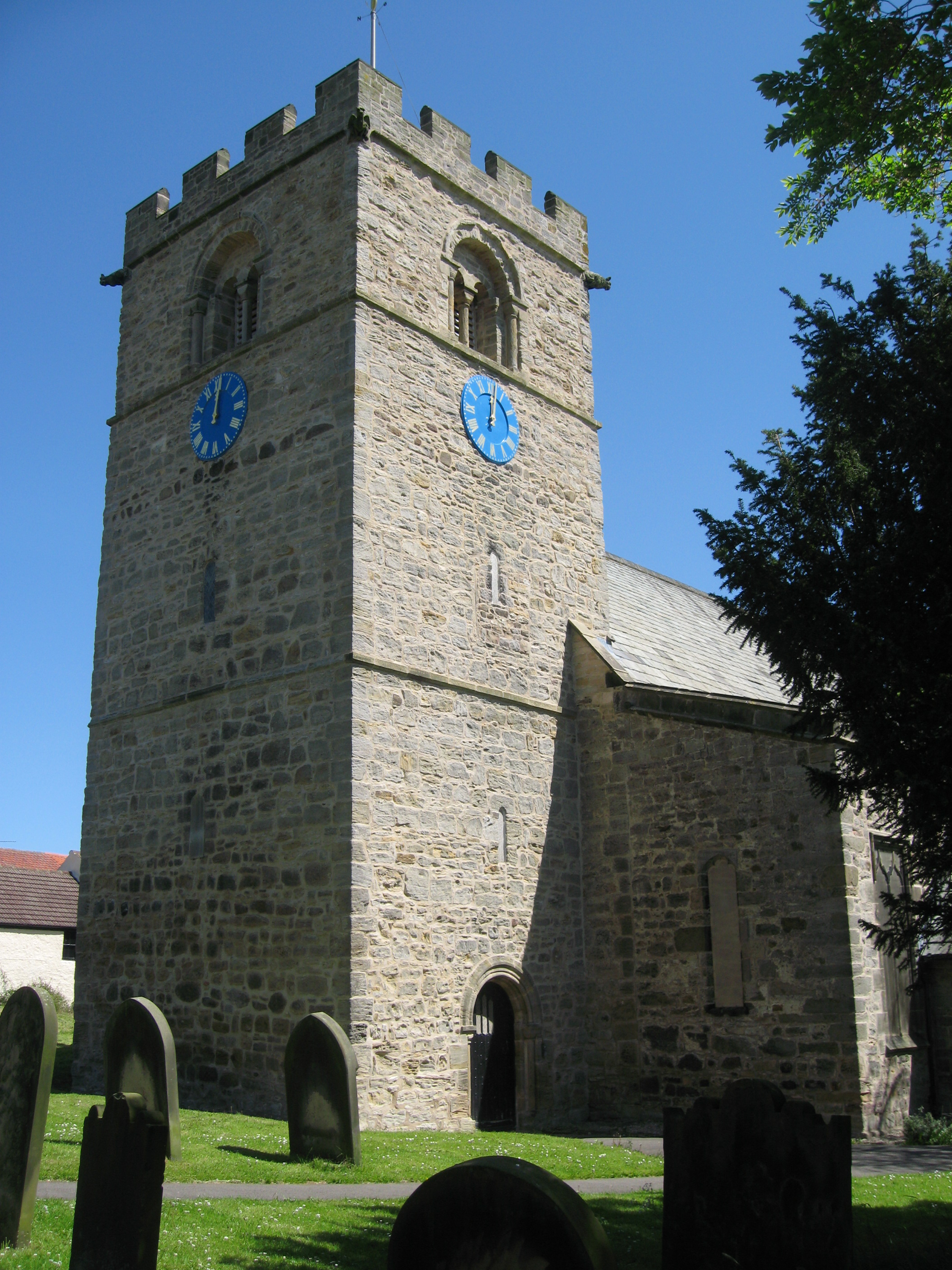
- The tower of St Michael's
- St Michael's Church, Heighington
- OS grid reference: NZ 24903 22365
- Country: England
- Denomination: Church of England
- Churchmanship: Central

History
- Status: Active
- Dedication: Saint Michael the Archangel

Architecture
- Functional status: Parish church

Administration
- Province: Province of York
- Diocese: Diocese of Durham
- Archdeaconry: Archdeaconry of Auckland
- Deanery: Darlington
- Parish: Herrington

Clergy
- Vicar: The Revd Lissa Scott

St Michael's Church is a Church of England parish church in Heighington, Darlington, County Durham. The church is a grade I listed building.

== History ==
The earliest parts of the tower, nave, and chancel date from before the Norman conquest (IE pre-1066). In circa 1160/1170, the chancel was rebuilt and a third stage was added to the tower. A vestry was added in the 13th century. The chantry chapel, originally dating to the 13th century, was extended in the 14th century to form the south aisle. In the 15th century, a parapet was added to the tower.

The church was altered during the Victorian restoration period. Restorations took place in the 1840s, and then under Ewan Christian from 1872 to 1875.

On 20 March 1967, the church was designated a grade I listed building.

=== Present day ===
St Michael's is part of the parish of Heighington in the Archdeaconry of Auckland of the Diocese of Durham. St Michael's stands in the Central tradition of the Church of England. It currently holds joint Anglican/Methodist services.
