= South Durham =

Parliamentary constituency in the United Kingdom, 1832–1885

- Former county constituency for the House of Commons
- From 1832-1868 and this area was left intact until 1885. Extract from 1837 result: the longer 'doubly' orange area which has an east coast.
- County: County Durham

1832–1885
- Seats: Two
- Created from: County Durham
- Replaced by: Barnard Castle, Bishop Auckland and South East Durham

South Durham, formally the Southern Division of Durham and often referred to as Durham Southern, was a county constituency of the House of Commons of the Parliament of the United Kingdom. It elected two Members of Parliament (MPs) by the bloc vote system of election.

== History ==
The constituency was created by the Great Reform Act for the 1832 general election, when the former Durham constituency was split into the northern and southern divisions, each electing two members using the bloc vote system.

The seat was abolished by the Redistribution of Seats Act 1885 when the two divisions were replaced by eight single-member divisions. These were Barnard Castle, Bishop Auckland, Chester-le-Street, Houghton-le-Spring, Jarrow, Mid Durham, North West Durham and South East Durham. In addition there were seven County Durham borough constituencies.

== Boundaries ==
1832–1885

- The Wards of Darlington and Stockton, with a place of election at Darlington.

See map on Vision of Britain website.

From 1868, included non-resident 40 shilling freeholders in the parliamentary boroughs of Darlington, Stockton-on-Tees and The Hartlepools, which were created by the Reform Act 1867.

== Members of Parliament ==
Election	First member	First party	Second member	Second party
1832	Joseph Pease	Whig	John Bowes	Whig
1841	Lord Harry Vane	Whig	John Bowes	Whig
1847	Lord Harry Vane	Whig	James Farrer	Conservative
1857	Lord Harry Vane	Whig	Henry Pease	Whig
1859	James Farrer	Conservative	Henry Pease	Liberal
1865	Joseph Pease	Liberal	Charles Surtees	Conservative
1868	Joseph Pease	Liberal	Frederick Beaumont	Liberal
1880	Joseph Pease	Liberal	Hon. Frederick Lambton	Liberal
1885	Redistribution of Seats Act: constituency abolished			

== Election results ==
=== Elections in the 1830s ===
General election 1832: South Durham
Party	Candidate	Votes	%
Whig	Joseph Pease	2,273	35.9
Whig	John Bowes	2,218	35.0
Whig	Robert Duncombe Shafto	1,841	29.1
Majority		377	5.9
Turnout		3,994	92.1
Registered electors		4,336	
Whig win (new seat)			
Whig win (new seat)			

General election 1835: South Durham
Party	Candidate	Votes	%
Whig	Joseph Pease	Unopposed	
Whig	John Bowes	Unopposed	
Registered electors		4,454	
Whig hold			
Whig hold			

General election 1837: South Durham
Party	Candidate	Votes	%
Whig	Joseph Pease	Unopposed	
Whig	John Bowes	Unopposed	
Registered electors		4,980	
Whig hold			
Whig hold			

=== Elections in the 1840s ===
General election 1841: South Durham
Party	Candidate	Votes	%	±%
Whig	Harry Vane	2,547	37.6	N/A
Whig	John Bowes	2,483	36.7	N/A
Conservative	James Farrer	1,739	25.7	New
Majority		744	11.0	N/A
Turnout		4,074	84.5	N/A
Registered electors		4,820		
Whig hold		Swing	N/A	
Whig hold		Swing	N/A	

General election 1847: South Durham
Party	Candidate	Votes	%	±%
Whig	Harry Vane	Unopposed		
Conservative	James Farrer	Unopposed		
Registered electors		5,783		
Whig hold				
Conservative gain from Whig				

=== Elections in the 1850s ===
General election 1852: South Durham
Party	Candidate	Votes	%	±%
Whig	Harry Vane	Unopposed		
Conservative	James Farrer	Unopposed		
Registered electors		5,616		
Whig hold				
Conservative hold				

General election 1857: South Durham
Party	Candidate	Votes	%	±%
Whig	Henry Pease	2,570	35.7	N/A
Whig	Harry Vane	2,542	35.3	N/A
Conservative	James Farrer	2,091	29.0	N/A
Majority		451	6.3	N/A
Turnout		4,647 (est)	83.5 (est)	N/A
Registered electors		5,565		
Whig hold		Swing	N/A	
Whig gain from Conservative		Swing	N/A	

General election 1859: South Durham
Party	Candidate	Votes	%	±%
Liberal	Henry Pease	Unopposed		
Conservative	James Farrer	Unopposed		
Registered electors		6,681		
Liberal hold				
Conservative gain from Liberal				

=== Elections in the 1860s ===
General election 1865: South Durham
Party	Candidate	Votes	%	±%
Liberal	Joseph Pease	3,401	35.7	N/A
Conservative	Charles Surtees	3,211	33.7	N/A
Liberal	Frederick Beaumont	2,925	30.7	N/A
Turnout		6,374 (est)	87.8 (est)	N/A
Registered electors		7,263		
Majority		190	2.0	N/A
Liberal hold		Swing	N/A	
Majority		286	3.0	N/A
Conservative hold		Swing	N/A	

General election 1868: South Durham
Party	Candidate	Votes	%	±%
Liberal	Joseph Pease	4,319	28.3	−7.4
Liberal	Frederick Beaumont	4,024	26.4	−4.3
Conservative	Charles Surtees	3,714	24.3	+7.4
Conservative	Gustavus Hamilton-Russell	3,206	21.0	+4.1
Majority		310	2.1	N/A
Turnout		7,632 (est)	81.6 (est)	−6.2
Registered electors		9,352		
Liberal hold		Swing	−5.8	
Liberal gain from Conservative		Swing	−5.9	

=== Elections in the 1870s ===
General election 1874: South Durham
Party	Candidate	Votes	%	±%
Liberal	Joseph Pease	4,792	36.5	+8.2
Liberal	Frederick Beaumont	4,461	33.9	+7.5
Conservative	Charles Vane-Tempest	3,887	29.6	−15.7
Majority		574	4.3	+2.2
Turnout		8,514 (est)	83.8 (est)	+2.2
Registered electors		10,159		
Liberal hold		Swing	+8.0	
Liberal hold		Swing	+7.7	

=== Elections in the 1880s ===
General election 1880: South Durham
Party	Candidate	Votes	%	±%
Liberal	Joseph Pease	5,930	37.3	+0.8
Liberal	Frederick Lambton	5,912	37.2	+3.3
Conservative	Charles Surtees	4,044	25.5	−4.1
Majority		1,868	11.7	+7.4
Turnout		9,974 (est)	86.0 (est)	+2.2
Registered electors		11,592		
Liberal hold		Swing	+1.4	
Liberal hold		Swing	+2.7	

== See also ==
- History of parliamentary constituencies and boundaries in Durham
- List of former United Kingdom Parliament constituencies
