= Heighington, County Durham =

Village in County Durham, England

Coordinates: 54.59537°N 1.61685°W

Heighington
- Location within County Durham
- Population: 2,395 (2011)
- OS grid reference: NZ248223
- Civil parish: Heighington
- Unitary authority: Darlington
- Ceremonial county: County Durham
- Region: North East
- Country: England
- Sovereign state: United Kingdom
- Post town: NEWTON AYCLIFFE
- Postcode district: DL5
- Dialling code: 01325
- Police: Durham
- Fire: County Durham and Darlington
- Ambulance: North East
- UK Parliament: Darlington

Heighington (/ˈhaɪ.ɪŋ.tən/ HYE-ing-tən) is a village in the borough of Darlington and ceremonial county of County Durham, England. The population of the civil parish at the 2011 census was 2,395. It is situated between Darlington and Shildon, near Newton Aycliffe. One of its most significant features is St Michael's Church, which sits in the middle of a large village green. The church is Norman, except for the 13th-century south aisle and the 19th-century north aisle. A rare feature in this church is a pre-Reformation oak pulpit with six traceried linen fold panels, with an inscription bearing prayers for its donor: an Alexander Flettcher and his wife Agnes.

Heighington previously boasted a Methodist Chapel, but this has since been converted into housing. The more recent expansion of the village is in the area around Pinewood Crescent and the area around the Beech Crescent, Manor Court and Orchard Gardens, built in 1997.

A recent, famous resident from Heighington is actor, writer and producer Mark Gatiss. It is often (wrongly) claimed that his father worked at nearby Winterton Hospital, and that this became the inspiration for ideas in The League of Gentlemen, but it was in fact Aycliffe Hospital where his father worked. The confusion likely arose from the fact that both (now demolished) hospitals lay in the district of Sedgefield and someone assumed it was Winterton. This mistake then led onto the assumption that Gatiss must therefore have been born in the village of Sedgefield (being next to Winterton Hospital), but in actuality, he was born only in the district of Sedgefield, in the village of Heighington, some miles away.

Heighington has a Spar shop and three pubs, The Bay Horse, The George and Dragon, and The Dog Inn, which lies just outside the village.

The village had a Post Office, which included a shop, next to the village green. The shop closed down and the Post Office, along with the postbox, was relocated to the village hall.

Since the turn of the millennium, a field on the outskirts of the village (on the way to Shildon and Bishop Auckland) has been converted into a football field. The site was being developed, including the construction of an adventure playground.

In 2006 Heighington was judged, by Ptolemy Dean, from amongst 11 other villages around the UK to be the BBC's Perfect Village.

Heighington CE Primary School is a voluntary controlled Church of England primary school located in Hopelands. It educates around 260 pupils aged 4–11. It has been assessed by Ofsted as providing an outstanding education.

Heighington was an important stop on the Stockton and Darlington railway built by George Stephenson in the early 19th century, operated by locomotive Locomotion No. 1. The station, which opened in 1827, is the world's oldest, and was in use until the 1970s. The building, Grade II*-listed, was in bad condition, but was restored in 1984 as an inn. The inn closed in 2017; in 2024 there were plans to renovate the derelict historical station in time for the 200th anniversary of the opening of the railway line. There is also a working Heighington station on Station Road, DL5 6PX.

== Gallery ==
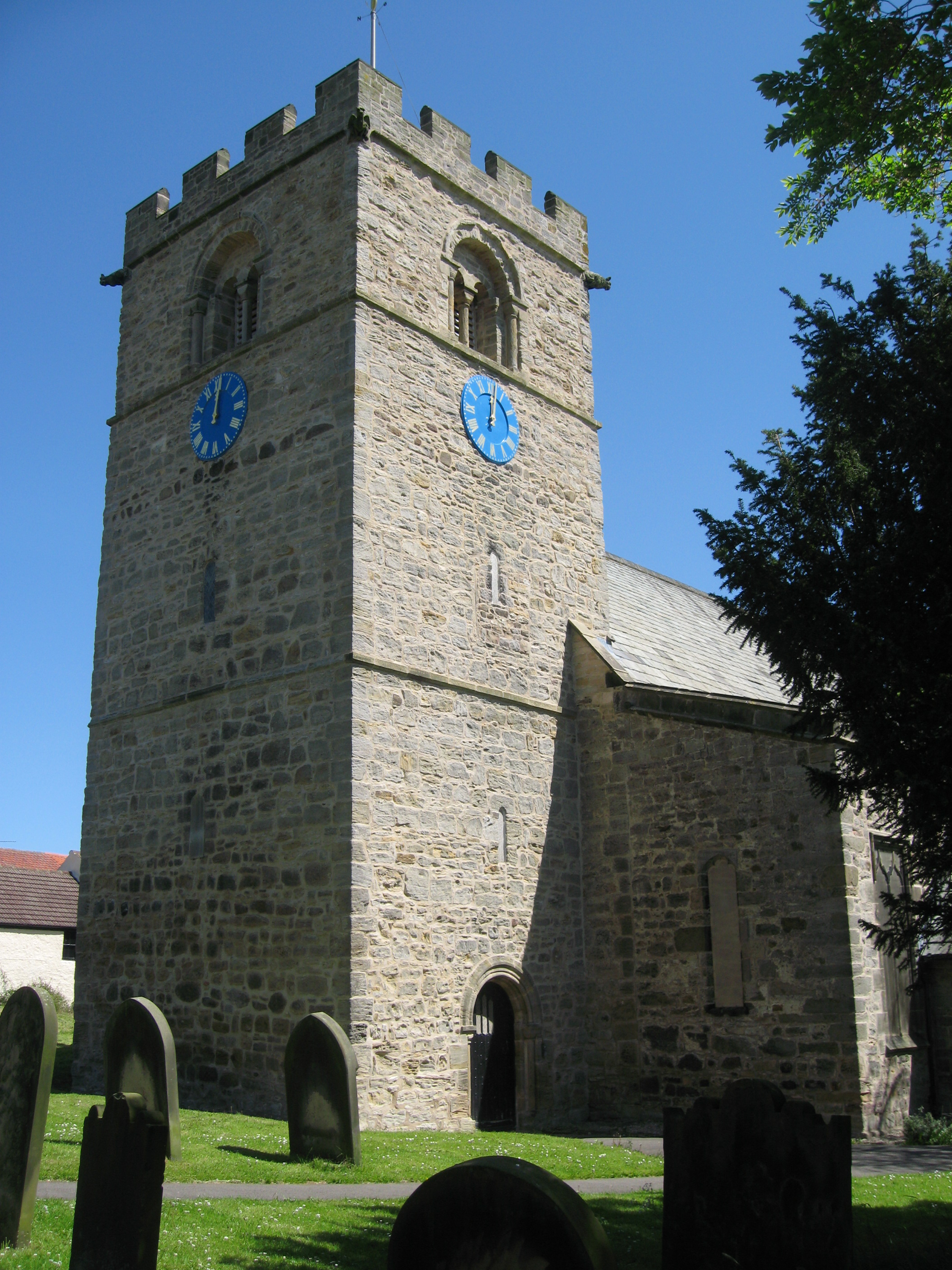
The tower of St Michael's Church, Heighington

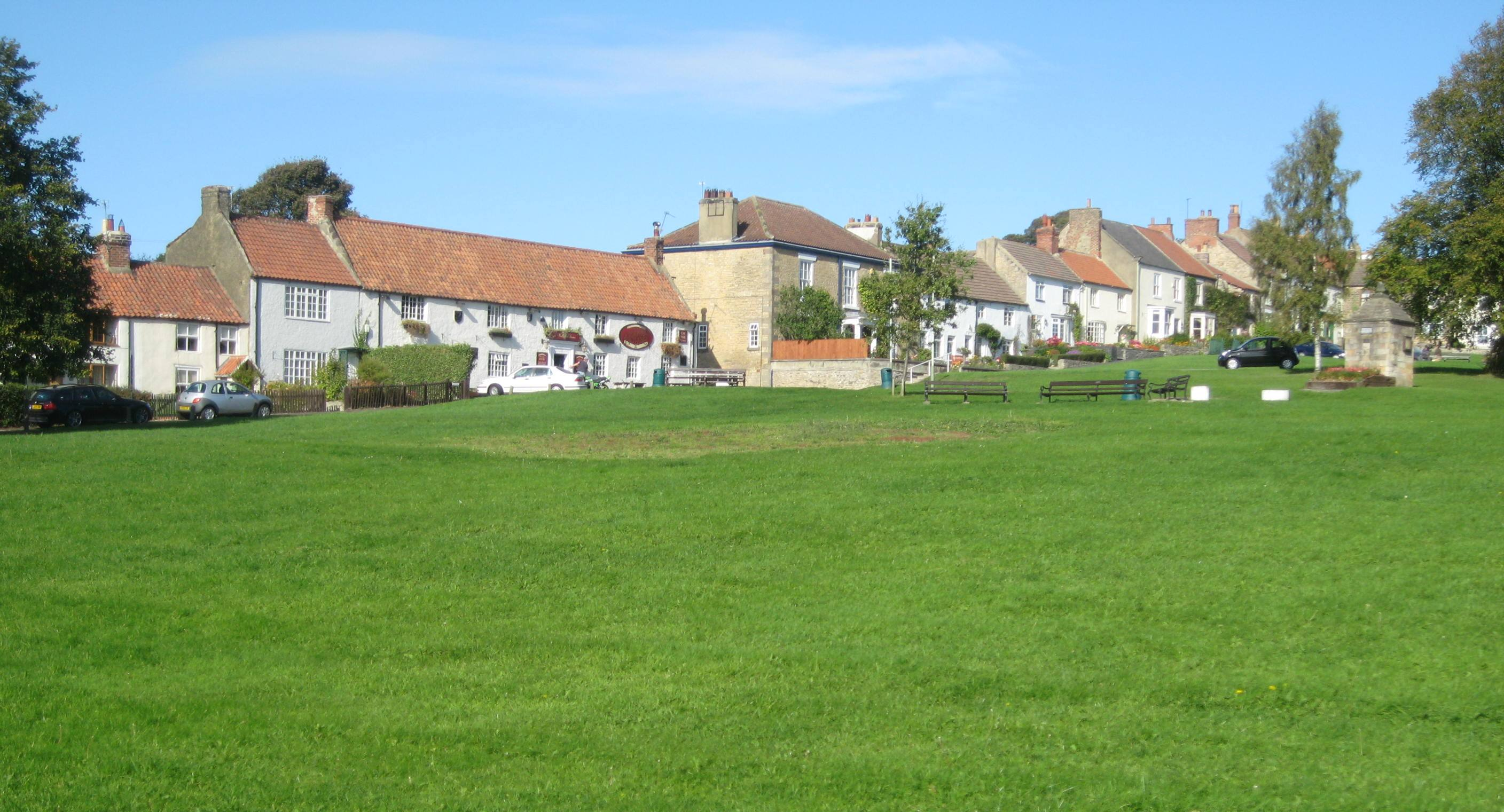
Heighington village green

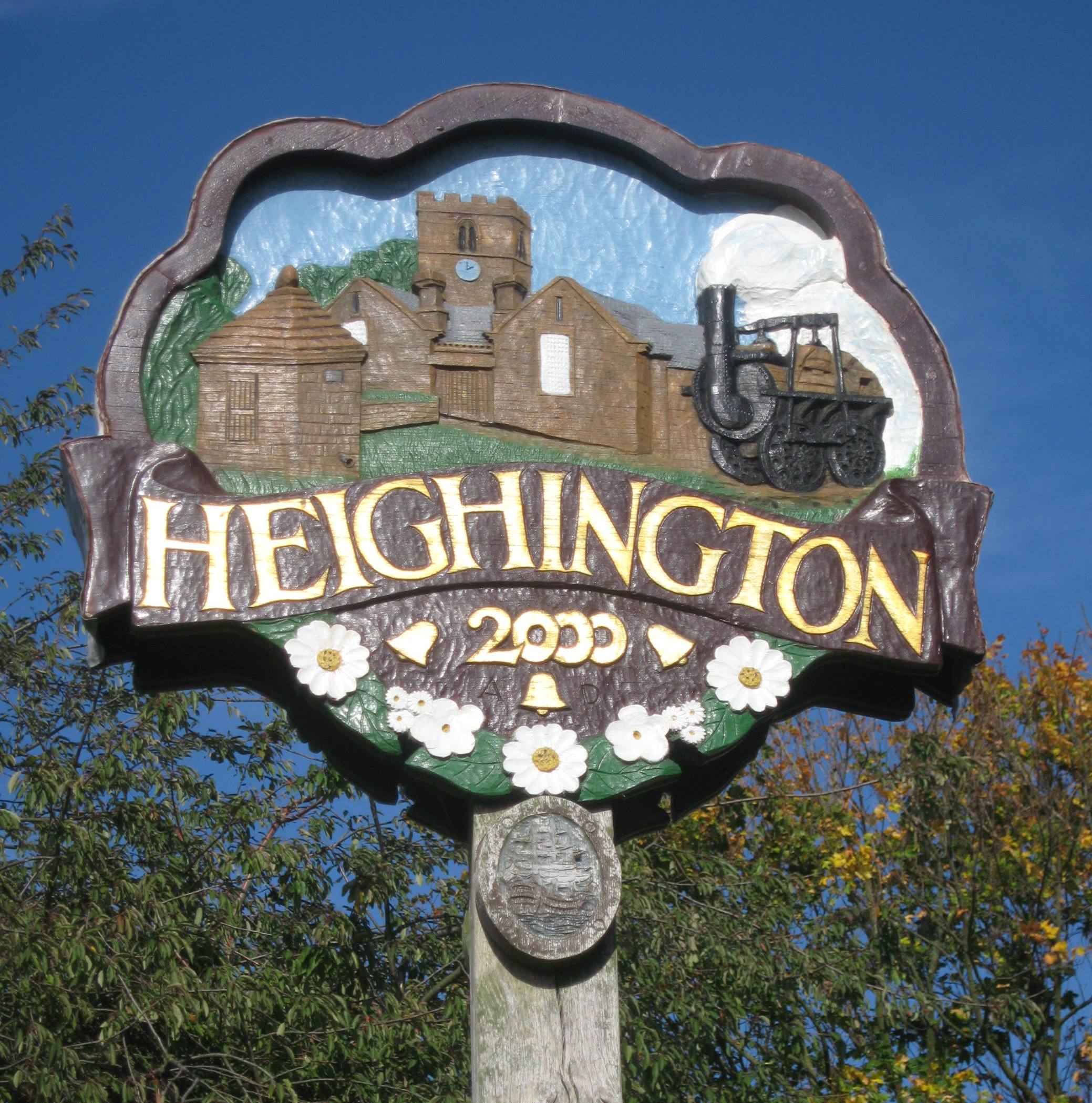
Heighington village sign - outside the village hall since 2000
