= Findlay (surname) =

Origin
- Word/name: Scotland

Findlay is a surname of Scottish origin.

== People with surname Findlay ==
- Adrian Findlay (born 1982), Jamaican sprinter
- Alexander Findlay, several people
- Anna Findlay (1885–1968), British artist
- Andrew Findlay (fl. 1920s), Scottish footballer
- Arthur Findlay (1883–1964), English writer, accountant, stockbroker, magistrate and spiritualist
- barbara findlay, Canadian lawyer
- Bill Findlay, several people
- Billy Findlay (born 1970), Scottish former footballer
- Brent Findlay (born 1985), New Zealand cricketer
- Brett Findlay (born 1972), British film and stage actor
- D. Cameron Findlay (born 1959), American government official and lawyer
- Charles Findlay (1891–1971), Royal Air Force officer, World War I flying ace
- Conn Findlay (1930–2021), American Olympic medalist in rowing and sailing
- Craig Findlay (born 1971), New Zealand cricketer
- Dave Finlay (born 1958), British-Irish professional wrestler
- David George Findlay (1913–1982), Suriname politician and newspaper owner.
- Deborah Findlay (born 1947), English actress
- Donald Findlay (born 1951), Scottish advocate; Lord Rector of the University of St Andrews
- Sir Edmund Findlay, 2nd Baronet (1902–1962), Scottish politician
- Elisabeth Findlay (contemporary), New Zealand fashion designer
- Frank Findlay (1884–1945), New Zealand politician
- George Findlay (1889–1967), Scottish soldier, recipient of the Victoria Cross
- Gillian Findlay (contemporary), Canadian television journalist
- Glen Findlay (born 1940), Canadian politician from Manitoba, member of the provincial legislative assembly
- Dame Harriet Findlay (1880–1954), British political activist and philanthropist
- Hugh Findlay (1822–1900), Scottish Mormon missionary to India
- Jack Findlay (1935–2007), Australian motorcycle road racer
- Jake Findlay (1954–2025), Scottish footballer
- James Findlay, several people
- Jessica Brown Findlay (born 1989), English actress
- John Findlay, several people
- Kathryn Findlay (1954–2014), British architect
- Katie Findlay (born 1990), Canadian actress
- Kerry-Lynne Findlay (born 1955), is the Minister of National Revenue of Canada
- Linnie Findlay (1919–2009), American historian and writer
- Sir Mansfeldt Findlay (1861–1932), British diplomat
- Margaret Cross Primrose Findlay (1902–1968), Scottish artist
- Martha Hall Findlay (born 1960), Canadian lawyer, businesswoman and politician
- Maude Findlay, fictional character in American sitcom Maude
- Maxwell Findlay (1898–1936), Scottish World War I flying ace
- Michael Findlay (1938–1977), American film director and producer
- Mike Findlay (born 1943), West Indian cricketer
- Neil Findlay (born 1969), Scottish politician
- Neil Douglas Findlay (1859–1914), British Army general
- Norman Findlay (1890–1949), English footballer
- Paula Findlay (born 1989), Canadian triathlete
- Polly Findlay, British theatre director
- Robert Findlay, several people
- Ronald Findlay (1935–2021), American professor of economics
- Russell Findlay (businessman) (born 1965), American advertising and marketing executive
- Ruth Findlay (1896–1949), American actress
- Shawn Findlay (born 1984), West Indies cricketer
- Stuart Graham Findlay (born 1983), Digital entrepreneur
- Stuart Findlay (born 1995), Scottish footballer
- Tom Findlay, one half of British Electronica duo Groove Armada
- Tom Findlay (1881–?), Scottish footballer
- William Findlay, several people

== See also ==
- George Findlay Andrew (1887-1971) missionary, sinologist, son of George Andrew and Jessie Findlay, pioneer missionaries of the China Inland Mission

== Other uses ==
- A sept of the Scottish Clan Farquharson
