= John Findlay =

John Findlay may refer to:

- John Findlay (footballer) (died 1916), Scottish footballer
- John Findlay (U.S. politician) (1766–1838), U.S. Representative from Pennsylvania
- John Findlay (New Zealand politician) (1862–1929), New Zealand politician of the Liberal Party
- John M. Findlay, University of Washington faculty member, author, and editor of Pacific Northwest Quarterly
- John Van Lear Findlay (1839–1907), U.S. Representative from Maryland
- John Niemeyer Findlay (1903–1987), 20th century philosopher
- John Ritchie Findlay (1824–1898), Scottish newspaper proprietor and philanthropist
- Sir John Ritchie Findlay, 1st Baronet (1866–1930), Scottish newspaper proprietor and philanthropist, son of the above
- John Walter Findlay (1866–1943), member of the Canadian House of Commons
- Edmund Findlay (John Edmund Ritchie Findlay, 1902–1962), Scottish politician
- Jake Findlay (John Williamson Findlay, 1954–2025), Scottish footballer

== See also ==
- Findlay baronets
- John Finley (disambiguation)
- John Finlay (disambiguation)
