= Edmund Backhouse (politician) =

United Kingdom Member of Parliament

Edmund Backhouse (1824 – 7 June 1906), banker and J.P. on the County Durham and North Riding of Yorkshire benches. He was a Member of Parliament for Darlington.

== Family ==
He was the youngest son of Jonathan Backhouse (1779–1842), banker, of Polam Hill, Darlington, and of his wife Hannah Chapman Backhouse, daughter of Joseph Gurney (1757–1841) and Jane Gurney, born Chapman of Norwich.

=== Parents ===
Both parents were ministers of the Religious Society of Friends (Quakers), travelling in Great Britain and North America.

=== Marriage ===
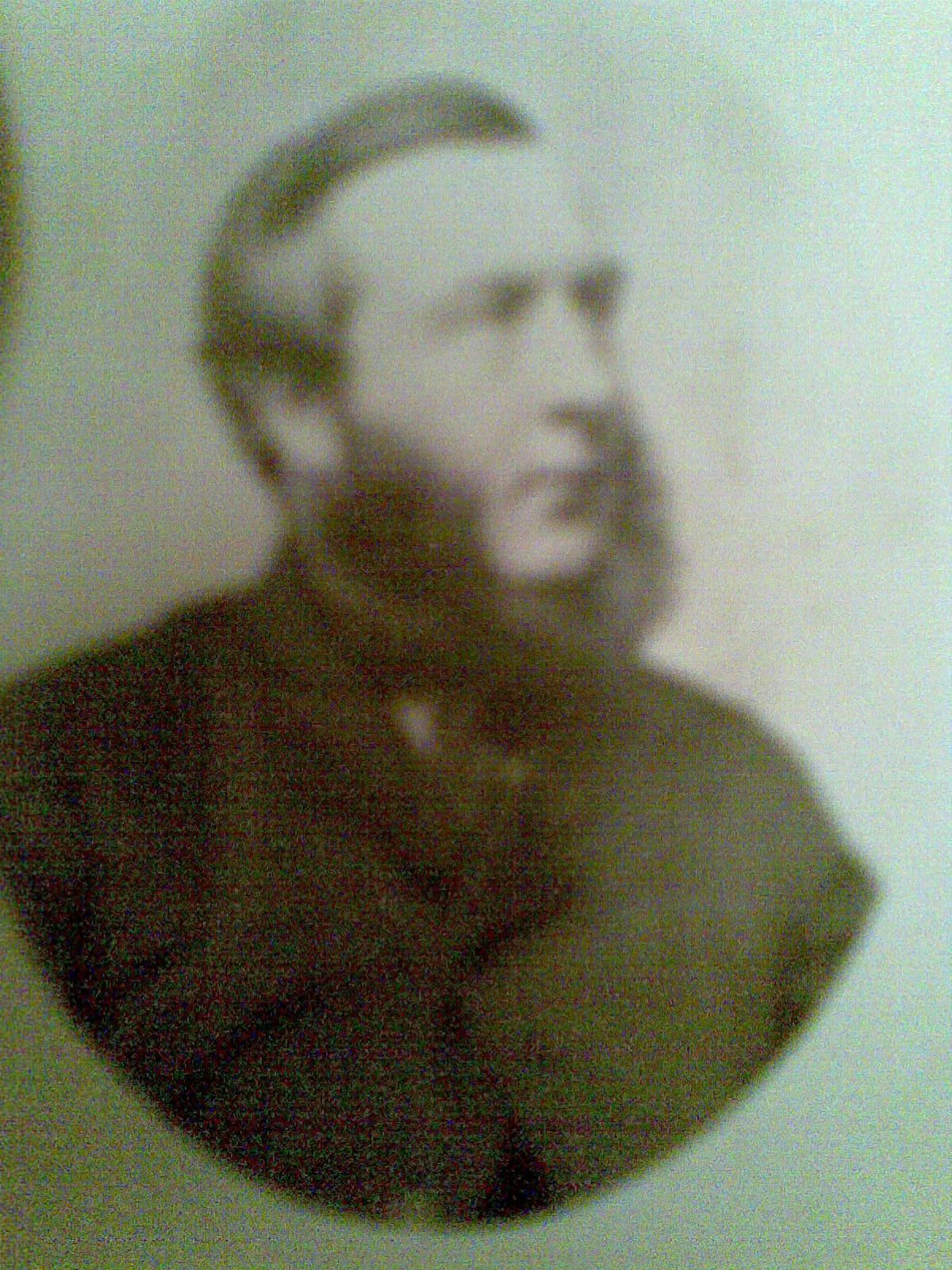
Edmund Backhouse

Edmund Backhouse married Juliet Mary, daughter and sole heiress of Charles Fox of Trebah in Cornwall, and his wife, Sarah. Their daughter Sarah Juliet married Horace Pym and was the mother of three children, including Sir Charles Pym, but died in 1880. They were also the parents of Sir Jonathan Backhouse, 1st Baronet and grandparents of Sir Edmund Backhouse, 2nd Baronet, Admiral Oliver Backhouse (1876–1943), twins: Lt-Col Miles Roland Charles Backhouse (1878–1962), Admiral of the Fleet Sir Roger Roland Charles Backhouse (1878–1939) and Lady Harriet Findlay DBE (1880–1954). After the deaths of his sister and brother-in-law, Jane and Barclay Fox, the Backhouses brought up their daughter, Jane Hannah Fox.

== Business ==
In 1845, he became a junior partner in Jonathan Backhouse & Company, the family bank.

== Politics ==
In 1867, he was elected M.P. for Darlington as a Liberal. He was re-elected in 1874and later retired from Parliament in 1880. He was succeeded by Theodore Fry.

== Residence in Cornwall ==
He bought Trebah from his father-in-Law. He probably played a large part in the development of the remarkable garden, which is now open to the public.

== Death ==
He died at Trebah on 7 June 1906, aged 82 years, and was buried at the Quaker Burial Ground in Budock. His executors sold Trebah to Mr. and Mrs. Hext

== Obituary in The Times ==
"Mr. Backhouse was a genial good-hearted gentleman, at once a banker and a country squire. He was diligent and painstaking in all he undertook in public or private life, and was considered one of the ablest representatives sent from the north to Parliament. He was not an orator, but his speeches were characterised by good sense and extreme caution. His judgement was considered safe and he was always conscientious."

Parliament of the United Kingdom
New constituency	Member of Parliament for Darlington; 1868–1880	Succeeded by Theodore Fry
