= Backhouse baronets of Uplands and The Rookery (1901) =

Escutcheon of the Backhouse baronets of Uplands and The Rookery

The Backhouse baronetcy, of Uplands in Darlington in the County of Durham and The Rookery in Middleton Tyas in the North Riding of the County of York, was created in the Baronetage of the United Kingdom on 6 March 1901 for Jonathan Backhouse, a deputy lieutenant and justice of the peace for the North Riding of Yorkshire and Co. Durham.

The Quaker family of Backhouse were prominent linen manufacturers in Darlington. In 1774 Jonathan Backhouse and his younger brother James formed Backhouse's Bank; it was merged in the formation of Barclays Bank in 1896. The 1st Baronet was a great-grandson of Jonathan. The 3rd Baronet was the nephew of the 2nd Baronet and son of Roger Backhouse RN. He died on active service in Normandy during the Second World War. As of 2026 the title is held by the 3rd Baronets grandson, the 5th Baronet, who succeeded his father in 2007.

== Backhouse baronets, of Uplands and The Rookery (1901) ==
- Sir Jonathan Edmund Backhouse, 1st Baronet (1849–1918)
- Sir Edmund Trelawney Backhouse, 2nd Baronet (1873–1944)
- Sir John Edmund Backhouse, 3rd Baronet (1909–1944)
- Sir Jonathan Roger Backhouse, 4th Baronet (1939–2007)
- Sir Alfred James Stott Backhouse, 5th Baronet (b. 2002)

== Notes ==
Baronetage of the United Kingdom
Preceded by Aird baronets	Backhouse baronets of Uplands and The Rookery; 6 March 1901	Succeeded by Gunter baronets
