= Harriet Findlay =

English political activist and philanthropist (1880–1954)

Dame Harriet Findlay DBE
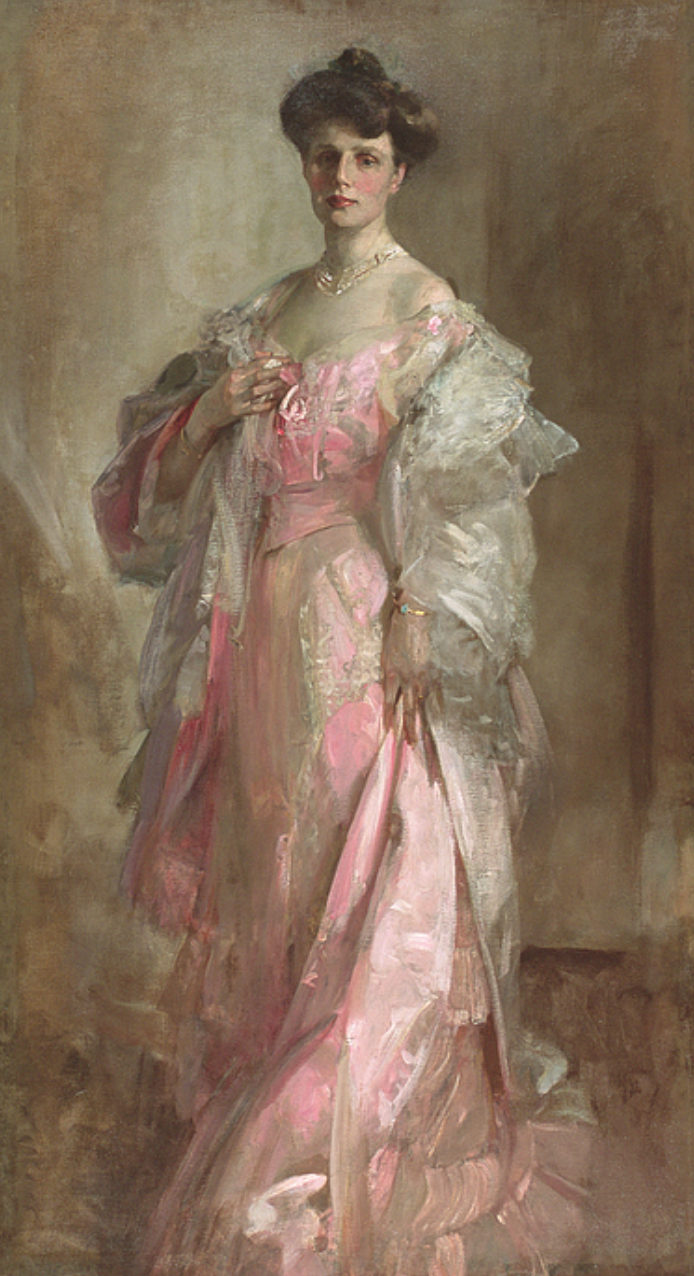
- Lady Findlay, 1904, by Sir James Guthrie
- Born: Harriet Jane Backhouse; 12 March 1880; Darlington, England
- Died: 24 July 1954 (aged 74); Edinburgh, Scotland
- Other names: Harriet, Lady Findlay
- Occupations: Political activist; philanthropist
- Spouse: Sir John Findlay (m. 1901; died 1930)
- Children: 5, including: Sir Edmund Findlay, 2nd Baronet; Lt.-Col. Sir Roland Lewis Findlay, 3rd Baronet
- Father: Sir Jonathan Backhouse, 1st Baronet

Dame Harriet Jane Findlay, Lady Findlay, DBE (née Backhouse; 12 March 1880 – 24 July 1954) was a British political activist and philanthropist.

== Life ==
Harriet Jane Backhouse was born in County Durham, the only daughter of banker Sir Jonathan Backhouse, 1st Baronet (1849–1918) and Florence Salusbury-Trelawny (1845–1902), daughter of John Salusbury-Trelawny. She had five brothers; her eldest, Edmund Blackhouse, was a prominent scholar, and two others, Sir Roger Backhouse and Oliver Backhouse, had distinguished careers in the Royal Navy.

In 1919, Findlay joined Rosaline Masson, Ella Millar and Miss M.R. MacLeod as the first four women to become members of the Cockburn Association, Edinburgh's influential conservation organisation formed in 1875 to protect and preserve the built heritage, natural environment and civic amenity in the city. In 1929, she founded the Portobello Toddler Hut, the longest-running community-operated nursery school in the United Kingdom.

She was active in Scottish politics becoming a Justice of the Peace in Edinburgh in 1926 and being elected president of the Scottish Unionist Association in 1927. She chaired the management board of the Edinburgh Royal Infirmary during the Great Depression.

== Personal life ==
Harriet Backhouse married Scottish newspaper proprietor Sir John Ritchie Findlay, 1st Baronet (son of John Ritchie Findlay and Susan Leslie) on 9 July 1901. They had three sons and two daughters, including:

- Elizabeth Findlay (died 1958)
- Laetitia Florence Findlay (died 5 July 1978), married Hugh Lucas-Tooth
- Sir (John) Edmund (Ritchie) Findlay, 2nd Baronet (14 June 1902 – 6 September 1962)
- Lt.-Col. Sir Roland Lewis Findlay, 3rd Baronet (14 July 1903 – 28 July 1979)

Lady Harriet Findlay was invested as a Dame Commander of the Order of the British Empire (DBE) in 1929 and was styled as Dame Harriet Findlay.

She died in Edinburgh on 24 July 1954, aged 74.
