= Matilda Sturge =

British Quaker minister, poet and essayist

- Born: 29 May 1829; St Pauls, Bristol
- Died: 13 June 1903 (aged 74); Winscombe
- Occupations: writer and minister

Matilda Sturge (29 May 1829 – 13 June 1903) was a British Quaker minister, poet and essayist from Bristol. She wrote about the lives of four Quaker women who had achieved because they were allowed the freedom to do so. Sturge is considered to have taken an underrated role in the renaissance in the Quaker movement.

== Life ==
Sturge was born in Wilson Street in the area of Bristol known as St Pauls in 1829. Her parents were Sarah (born Stephens) and Jacob Player Sturge. Her father was a surveyor. She was raised in a strict Quaker family where her dress was restrained and her reading and entertainment was restricted. These strict rules were imposed when most of her peers were experiencing more freedom from their Quaker families. Joseph Sturge the leading abolitionist was her first cousin. She was the sixth of a family of eight. Her brothers were teased for their clothes but their father told them it was "suffering for righteousness".

She wrote essays and biographies of leading Quakers that were published in Quaker periodicals over a period of three decades. Her subjects included the educationalist Mary Carpenter in Bristol, the activist for women's rights in India Pandita Ramabai, Sister Dora Pattison who had created hospitals in Walsall. Closer to home she wrote about her niece Emily Sturge and her friend the Quaker minister Ann Hunt. She also wrote about other issues including social issues, temperance, history and religion.

Sturge taught at Sunday School and at a First Day School. Many of her contemporaries were attending lectures for women in Bristol and Matilda may well have attended.

In 1870 she began a thirty year association with the Friends’ Quarterly Examiner. She contributed her writing and at some time she may have been editing.

In 1880 she wrote about four leading Quaker women Mary Dudley who was a preacher, her daughter Elizabeth Dudley, the prison reformer Elizabeth Fry, and Hannah Chapman Backhouse. The book was titled Types of Quaker Womanhood and it was published by the Friends' Tract Association. The short work showed how these Quaker women who had enjoyed less restrictions in their lives and as a result they had contributed good works.

Her poetry was included in The Quaker Poets of Great Britain and Ireland in 1896.

Sturge died in Winscombe in 1903. Sturge is considered to have taken an underrated role in the renaissance in the Quaker movement.
