= Elizabeth Dudley (Quaker) =

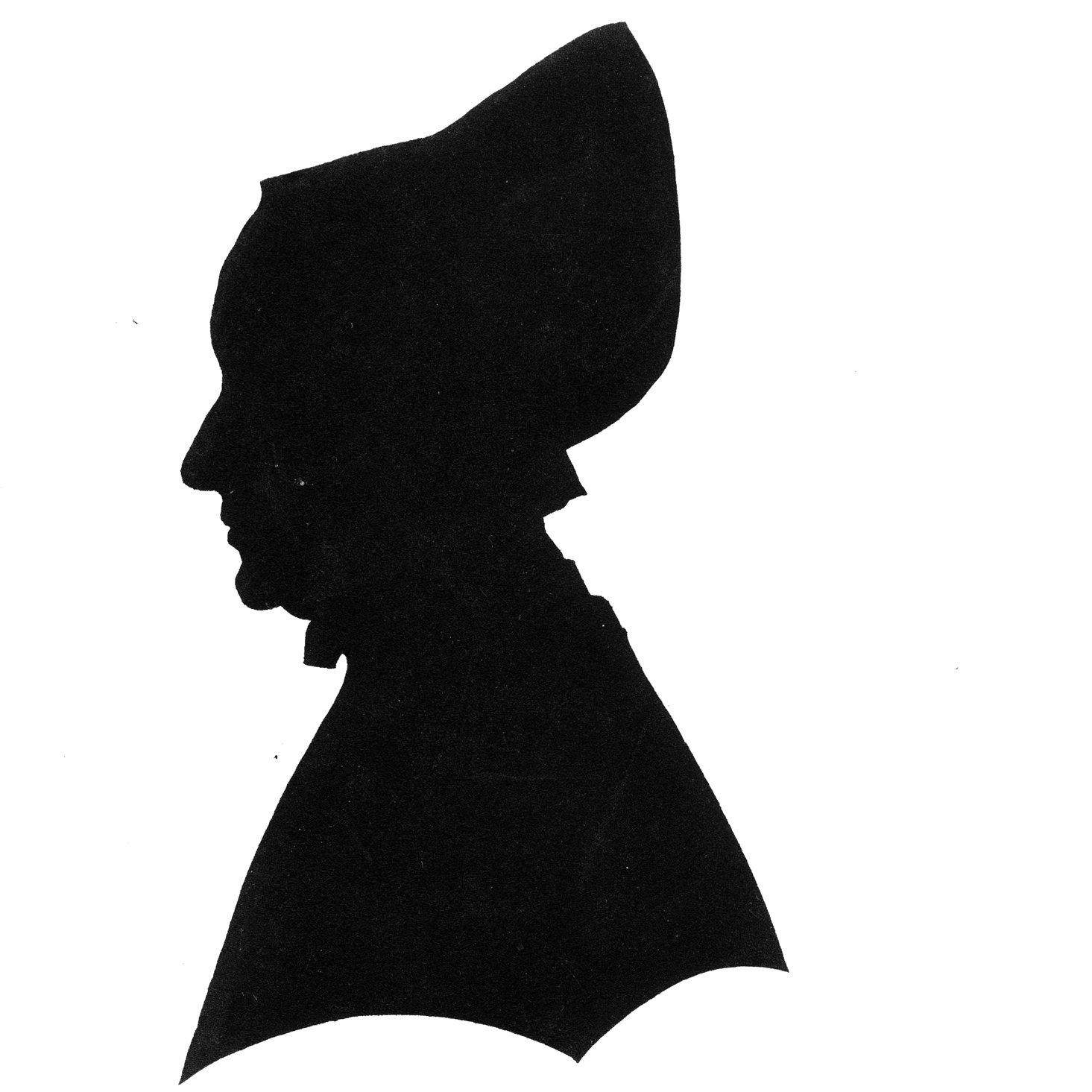
- Born: 1 September 1779; Clonmel
- Died: 7 September 1849 (aged 70); Peckham
- Occupation: Preacher
- Known for: Leading evangelist for the Quakers

Elizabeth Dudley (1 September 1779 – 7 September 1849) was an Irish born Quaker minister. She was the daughter of another leading minister, Mary Dudley. A later commentator decided that she contributed good works because she enjoyed less restrictions in her life than many women.

== Life ==
Dudley was born in Clonmel. Her parents were Robert and Mary Dudley. Her mother was a leading Quaker preacher and she was the first of their eight children. Her brother Charles Dudley was active in the British and Foreign Bible Society. Charles' son Robert Dudley was a noted artist.

In 1808 she was accepted as a preacher for the Quakers in Southwark. She had moved with her widowed mother and her two sisters to London the year before. Her assessors noted that she was not as emotional in her preaching as her mother but she had a more reasoned approach. She travelled to preach in Britain but she did not travel abroad and only once visited Ireland despite her links to County Tipperary.

Her mother died in Peckham in 1823. In 1825 she put together her autobiography which was titled "The life of Mary Dudley, with some account of the illness and death of her daughter."

In 1880 Matilda Sturge wrote about four leading Quaker women: Elizabeth Gurney Fry, Hannah Chapman Backhouse, Mary Dudley and Elizabeth Dudley. The book was titled Types of Quaker Womanhood and it was published by the Friends' Tract Association. The short work showed how Mary and the other Quaker women had contributed good works because they enjoyed less restrictions in their lives than many women.

Dudley died in Peckham. Twelve years later Charles Tyler published a book about her life based on her diary and letters and also including correspondence by her sister Charlotte Dudley.
