= Edmund Backhouse =

Edmund Backhouse may refer to:

- Edmund Backhouse (MP) (1824–1906), Member of Parliament for Darlington 1868–1880
- Sir Edmund Backhouse, 2nd Baronet (1873–1944), his grandson and a fraudulent diarist
