= The Paying-out Machinery in the Stern of the Great Eastern =

1865 painting by Robert Charles Dudley

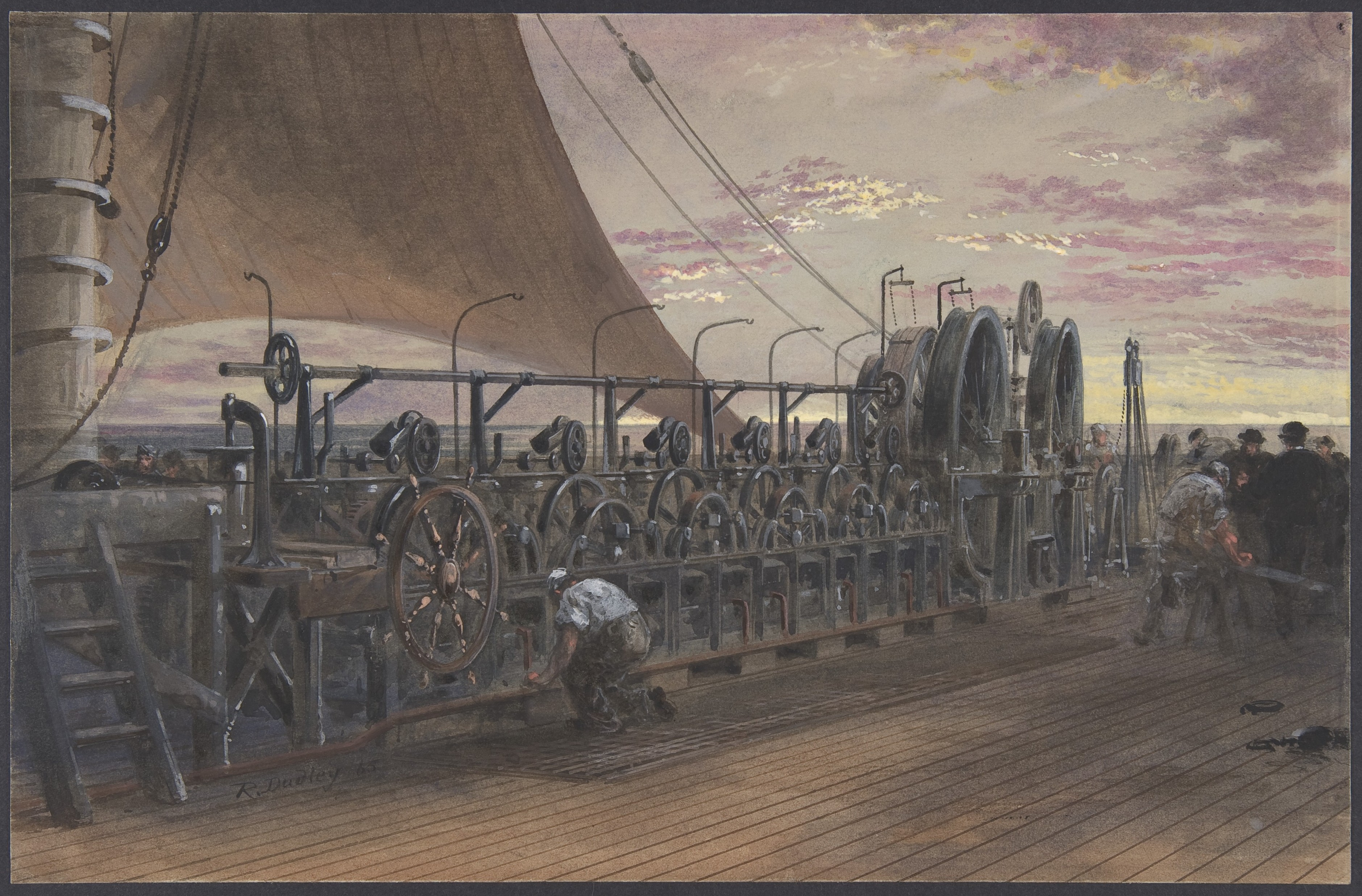
- Artist: Robert Charles Dudley
- Year: 1865
- Medium: Watercolor and gouache on graphite
- Dimensions: 17.2 cm × 26.7 cm (6.8 in × 10.5 in)
- Location: Metropolitan Museum of Art; New York City

The Paying-out Machinery in the Stern of the Great Eastern is a watercolor by British artist Robert Charles Dudley. The work is available in the collection of the Metropolitan Museum of Art.

== Description ==
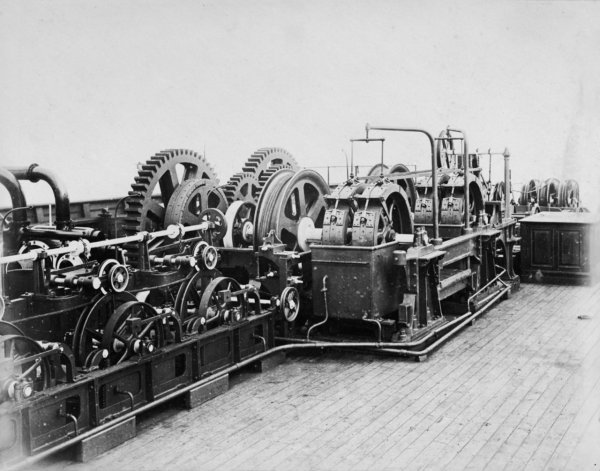
A photograph of the Great Eastern's cable-paying machinery, circa 1870s

Dudley's watercolor depicts a large piece of cable-laying machinery on the rear deck of the iron sail steamer SS Great Eastern. The machinery was used to lay (also referred to as "paying out") the first transatlantic undersea cable. Upon its completion in 1866, the cable allowed telegraph messages to be sent across the Atlantic; these took minutes to travel between North America and Europe as opposed to the 10 days it took for contemporary mail carriers to make the crossing.
