= Mary Dudley (disambiguation) =

Mary Dudley (c. 1530–1535–1586) was an English lady-in-waiting at the court of Elizabeth I and the mother of Sir Philip Sidney and Mary Sidney Herbert, Countess of Pembroke.

Mary Dudley may also refer to:

- Mary (Dudley) Sutton, Countess of Home (1586–1644), British patron of the arts
- Mary Dee or Mary Dudley (1912–1964), African-American radio personality
- Mary Dudley (Quaker) (1750–1823), British Quaker minister
