= John Stark (police officer) =

British police officer (1865–1940)

John Stark CBE KPM

Assistant Commissioner of the City of London Police
- In office 1925–1933

Personal details
- Born: 16 April 1865 Carham, Northumberland, England
- Died: 6 July 1940 (aged 75)

John Stark CBE KPM (16 April 1865 – 6 July 1940) was a British police officer who served as Assistant Commissioner of the City of London Police from 1925 to 1933.

Stark was born in Carham, Northumberland. He joined the City Police as a constable in 1885. He rose through every rank and by 1912 he was chief superintendent and chief clerk. His 48 years of service were a record in the force to date.

He was awarded the King's Police Medal (KPM) in January 1912 and was appointed Officer of the Order of the British Empire (OBE) in the 1920 civilian war honours and Commander of the Order of the British Empire (CBE) in the 1931 New Year Honours.

He died in 1940 at the age of 75.

Police appointments
| Preceded by Donald Bremner | Assistant Commissioner, City of London Police; 1925–1933 | Succeeded by John Arthur Davison |
