= Aird baronets =

Baronetcy in the Baronetage of the United Kingdom

- Creation date: 1901
- Status: extant
- Motto: Vigilantiâ, By vigilance
- Arms: Gules on a chevron between in chief two wolves' heads erased and in base an increscent between the horns a mullet of six point all Argent two falcons' heads erased Sable.
- Crest: Upon a bull-headed rail fesswise a lion rampant holding between the paws a spike all Proper.

The Aird baronetcy, of Hyde Park Terrace in Paddington in the County of London, is a title in the Baronetage of the United Kingdom. It was created on 5 March 1901 for the civil engineering contractor and Conservative politician John Aird.

The present Baronet is a co-heir to the barony of Willoughby de Eresby

== Aird baronets, of Hyde Park Terrace (1901) ==
- Sir John Aird, 1st Baronet (1833–1911)
- Sir John Aird, 2nd Baronet (1861–1934)
- Sir John Renton Aird, 3rd Baronet (1898–1973)
- Sir (George) John Aird, 4th Baronet (1940–2023)
- Sir James John Aird, presumed 5th Baronet (born 1978). As of 2026 the Official Roll marks the baronetcy as vacant.

The heir apparent is the present baronet's son Roman Jack Aird (born 2011).

Baronetage of the United Kingdom
Preceded by Mitchell-Thomson baronets	Aird baronets of Hyde Park Terrace; 5 March 1901	Succeeded by Backhouse baronets
