= John Finley =

John Finley may refer to:

- John Finley (frontiersman) (1724–1783), frontiersman in Kentucky, companion of Daniel Boone.
- John Finley (Finleyville) (1759–1846), pioneer settler of western Pennsylvania
- John Park Finley (1854–1943), American tornado expert
- John Huston Finley (1863–1940), American academic and editor
- John L. Finley (1935–2006), American astronaut
- John Finley (musician) (born 1945), Canadian musician
- John Michael Finley or J. Michael Finley, American actor, lead role in the 2018 film I Can Only Imagine

== See also ==
- John Finlay (disambiguation)
- John Findlay (disambiguation)
