= Sir John Aird, 4th Baronet =

British baronet (1940–2023)

Sir George John Aird, 4th Baronet (30 January 1940 – 4 May 2023) was a British aristocrat. He was the son of Sir John Renton Aird, 3rd Baronet and Lady Priscilla Heathcote-Drummond-Willoughby. He was usually called by his middle name John.

== Biography ==
George John Aird was educated at Eton College, and was Page of Honour to The Queen from 1955 to 1957. Later in his life, he studied at Harvard University from which he graduated with a Master of Business Administration (M.B.A.). In 1966 he was registered as a Member of the Institution of Civil Engineers (M.I.C.E.).

Aird was chairman and managing director of Sir John Aird and Company Limited from 1969 to 1996. In 1981 he was chairman of Matcon.

On his father's death on 20 November 1973, he succeeded him as 4th Baronet. His mother died in December 2002.

On 31 August 1968, he married Margaret Elizabeth Muir (1946–2010), daughter of Sir John Harling Muir, 3rd Baronet. They have three children:

- Rebecca Aird (born 22 July 1970)
- Belinda Elizabeth Aird (born 14 May 1972)
- Sir James John Aird, 5th Baronet (born 12 June 1978)

On 11 August 2011, he married Xiao Fen Wang, an M.B.A. graduate and the daughter of Jing Fen Wang (王景芬) of Beijing, a professor of Chinese calligraphy and a writer of TV series.

Aird was co-heir presumptive of the barony of Willoughby de Eresby, his mother being an aunt of the present Baroness.

Aird died on 4 May 2023, at the age of 83.

== Arms ==
Coat of arms of Sir John Aird, 4th Baronet

Crest
Upon a bull-headed rail fesswise a lion rampant holding between the paws a spike all Proper.
Escutcheon
Gules on a chevron between in chief two wolves' heads erased and in base an increscent between the horns a mullet of six-point all Argent two falcons' heads erased Sable.
Motto
Vigilantiâ

Court offices
Preceded by Viscount Carlow	Page of Honour; 1955–1956	Succeeded by Lord Ardee
Baronetage of the United Kingdom
Preceded by John Renton Aird	Baronet (of Hyde Park Terrace); 1973–2023	Succeeded by James John Aird
