= John Finlay =

John Finlay may refer to:

- Jack Finlay (1889–1942), Irish hurler for Laois, later TD for Laois-Offaly
- Jock Finlay (1882–1933), Scottish footballer
- John Baird Finlay (1929–2010), Dominican Republic-born Canadian politician, member of the Canadian House of Commons 1993–2004
- John Finlay (Canadian politician) (1837–1910), Canadian politician, member of the Canadian House of Commons 1904–1908
- John Finlay (Dean of Leighlin) (1842–1921), Irish Dean of Leighlin, 1895–1912
- John Finlay (footballer) (1919–1985), English footballer
- John Finlay (fur trader) (1774–1833), Canadian fur trader and explorer with the North West Company
- John Finlay (poet) (1782–1810), Scottish poet

== See also ==
- John Finley (disambiguation)
- John Findlay (disambiguation)
