= Dunn & Findlay =

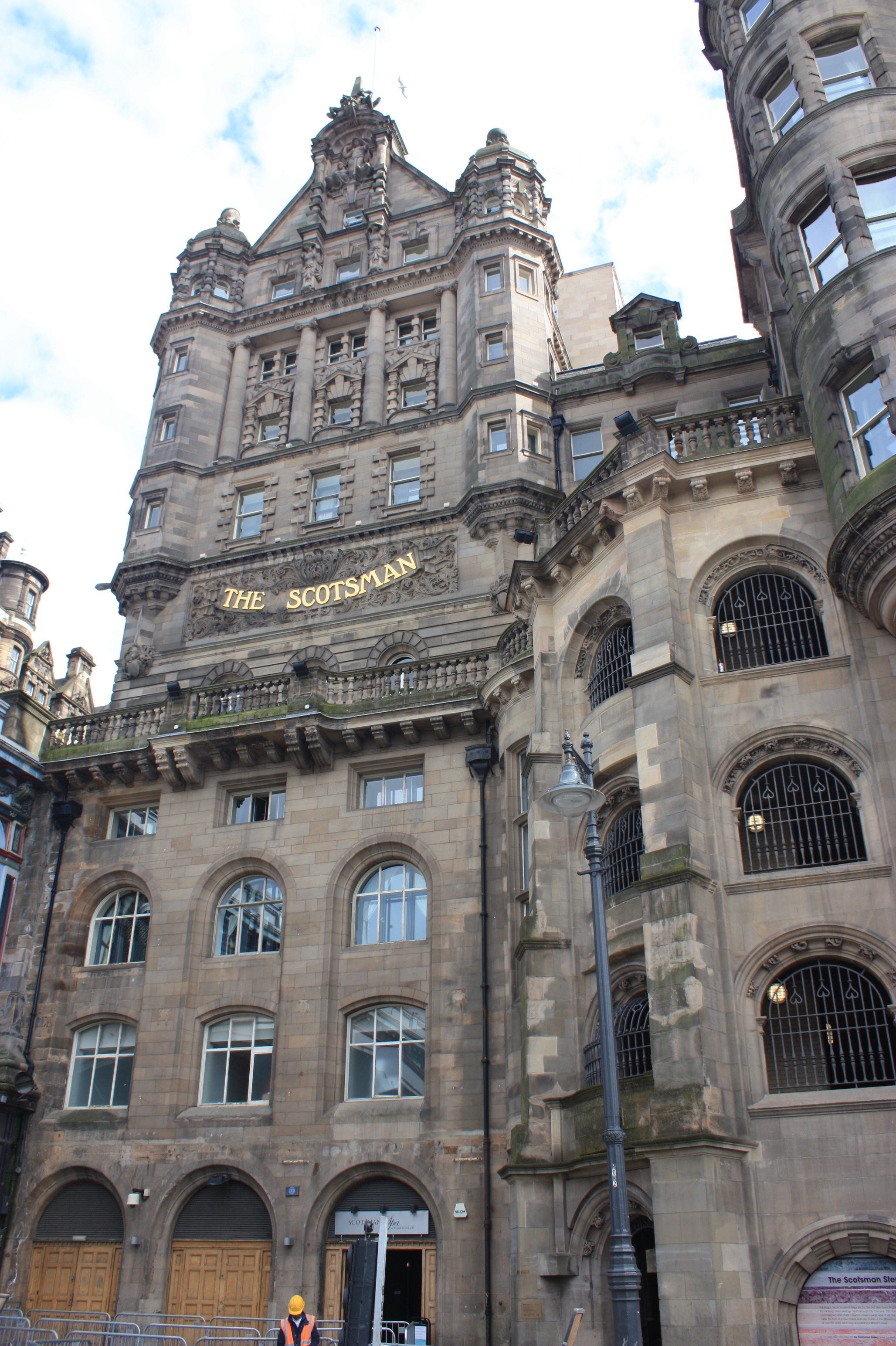
Scotsman Buildings as seen from below

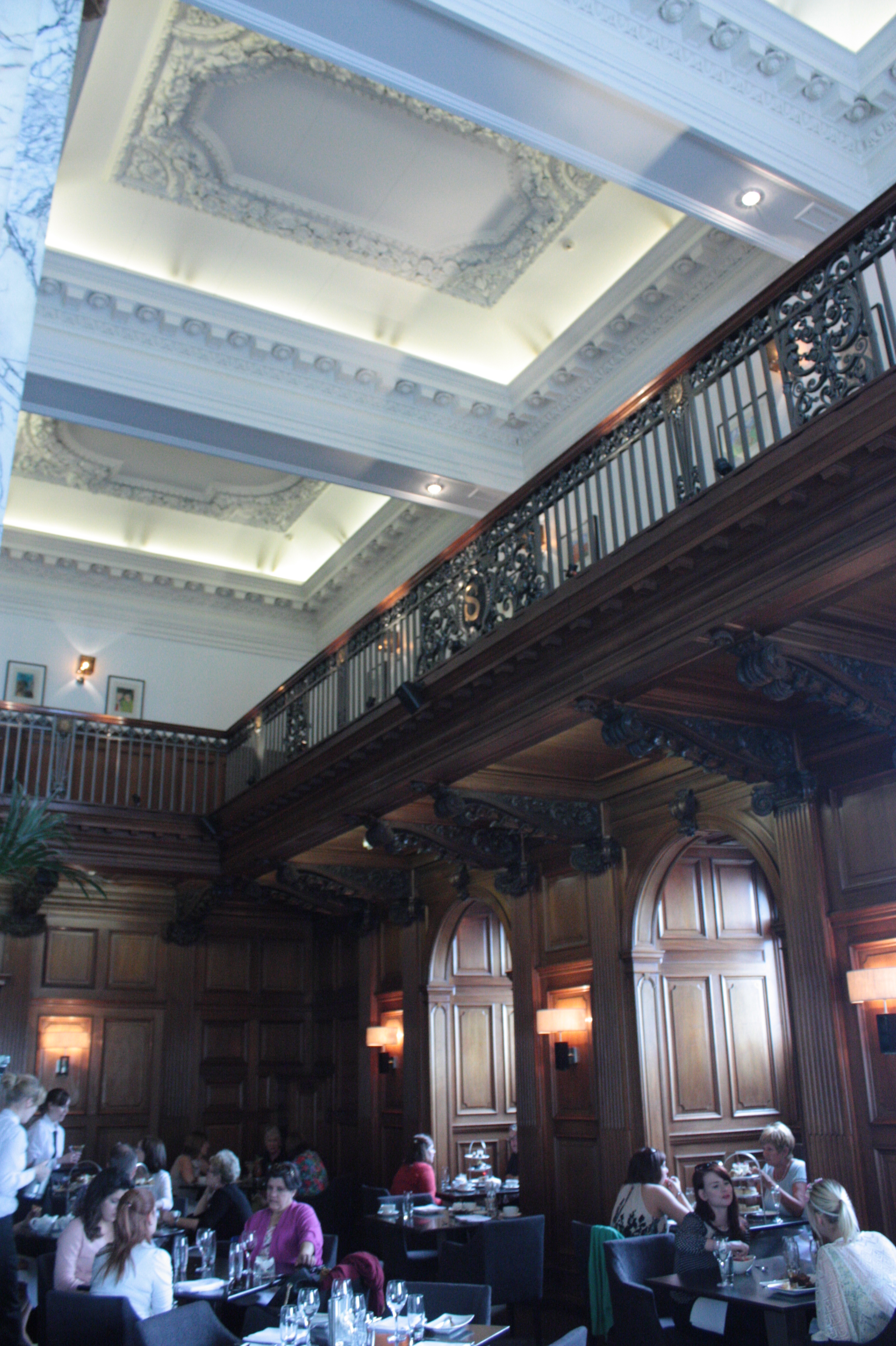
The Scotsman office interior (Dunn & Findlay) - formerly the public counter, now a restaurant

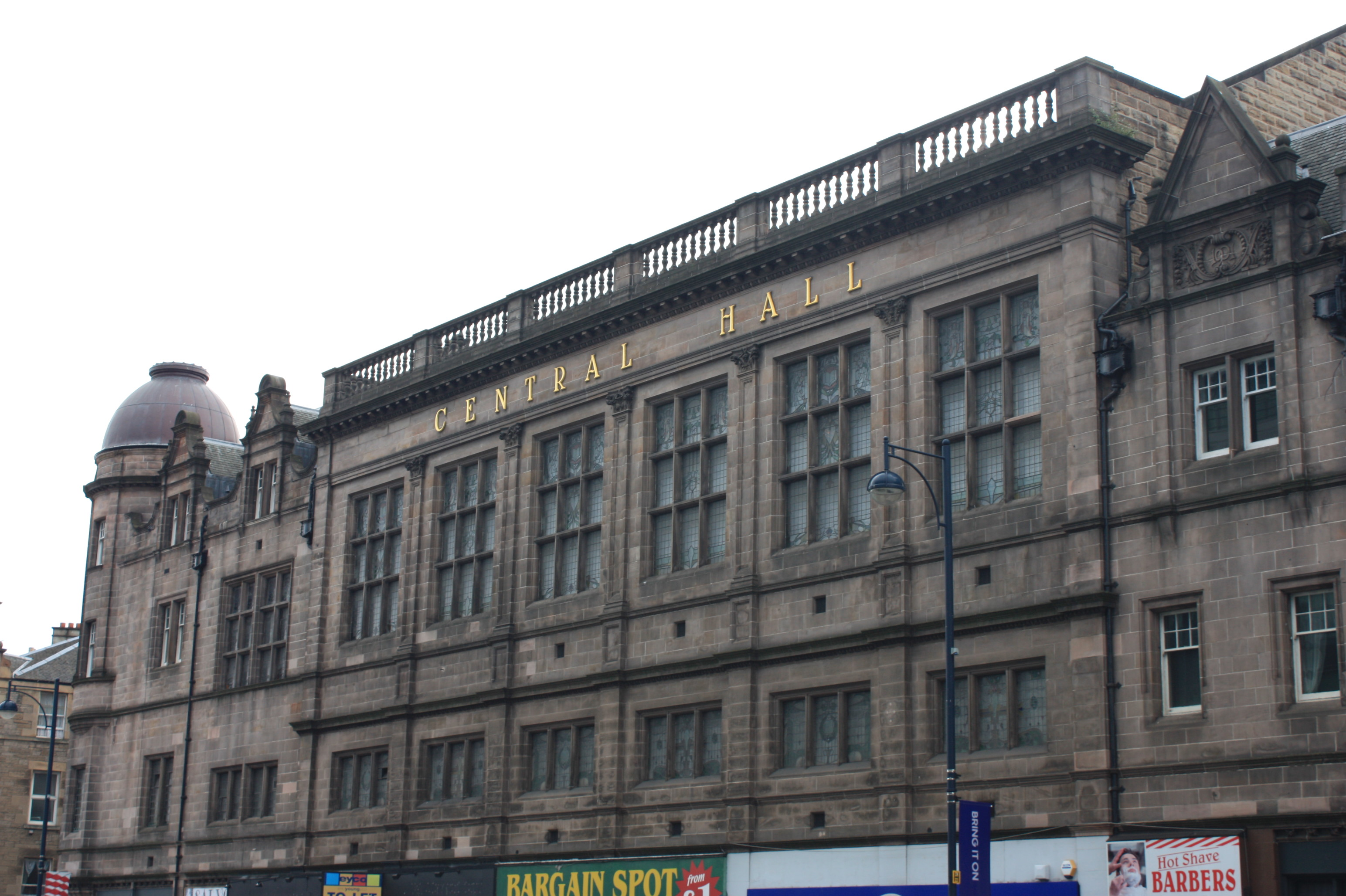
Central Methodist Hall, Tollcross Edinburgh

Dunn & Findlay were a firm of Scottish architects operating in the late 19th century and responsible for a number of important commercial buildings including The Scotsman buildings which form part of the Edinburgh Old Town skyline. Each was also independently successful in his own right prior to the partnership. The partnership officially lasted from 1894 until 1903. It was arguably "a marriage of convenience": Dunn providing the skill, Findlay providing the business connections.

== James Bow Dunn ==
James Bow Dunn was born in Pollokshields, Glasgow on 16 January 1861. His family moved to Edinburgh whilst he was young and there he attended George Watson’s College.

In March 1876 he was apprenticed to the architect James Campbell Walker, from whence he found a position in the Burgh Engineer’s Office in 1885.

In 1887 he came to fame coming a close second to George Washington Browne in a competition for Edinburgh’s Central Library (funded by the Andrew Carnegie Trust). In 1888 a second competition paid off and he won a commission for the huge Solicitor’s Buildings complex south of the Edinburgh Law Courts.

In later life he set up a second practice in Northumberland and specialised in large country houses.

He died suddenly on 25 August 1930 a week after a hospital operation.

== James Leslie Findlay ==
James Leslie Findlay was a son of the Victorian newspaper magnate, John Ritchie Findlay, owner of The Scotsman newspaper . He was born on 30 April 1868. He was educated at Harrow School and thereafter apprenticed to the eminent Arts And Crafts architect, Sydney Mitchell, who was a close friend of his father. Although most of his work appears to be achieved through nepotism, being commissioned by his father, he is nevertheless an accomplished architect of skill.

In 1915 he gave up architecture to pursue a military career as a Lieutenant Colonel commanding the First Lowland Division of the Royal Field Artillery, serving with the 51st Highland Division on the Somme. He was invalided out of the army and thereafter became a gentleman of leisure.

He died on 19 September 1952.

== Principal Joint Works ==
- Offices and print-works for The Scotsman North Bridge and Market Street (now the Scotsman Hotel and the City Art Centre) including the Scotsman Steps (1899-1902). A category A listed building.
- Methodist Church Halls on Earl Grey Street (1899-1901)

== Lesser Joint Works ==
- 6-28 Montpelier Park (1893)
- Hawthorn Buildings, Dean Village (1895)
- Two tenements, Home Street (1897)
- 34,35 Drumsheugh Gardens conversion to Muir Hall of Residence (1898)
- Abinger Terrace (1898)
- Villas, 22,24,26 and 30 Inverleith Place (1899)
- Craighouse Terrace (1899)
- 198-206 Bruntsfield Place (1902)
- Villa, 4 Spylaw Avenue (1902)
- Dean Parish Church (1902/3)
- 5-7 Frederick Street (1903)

== Works solely by Findlay ==
- Dean Path Buildings (commissioned by his father) (1885)

== Works solely by Dunn ==
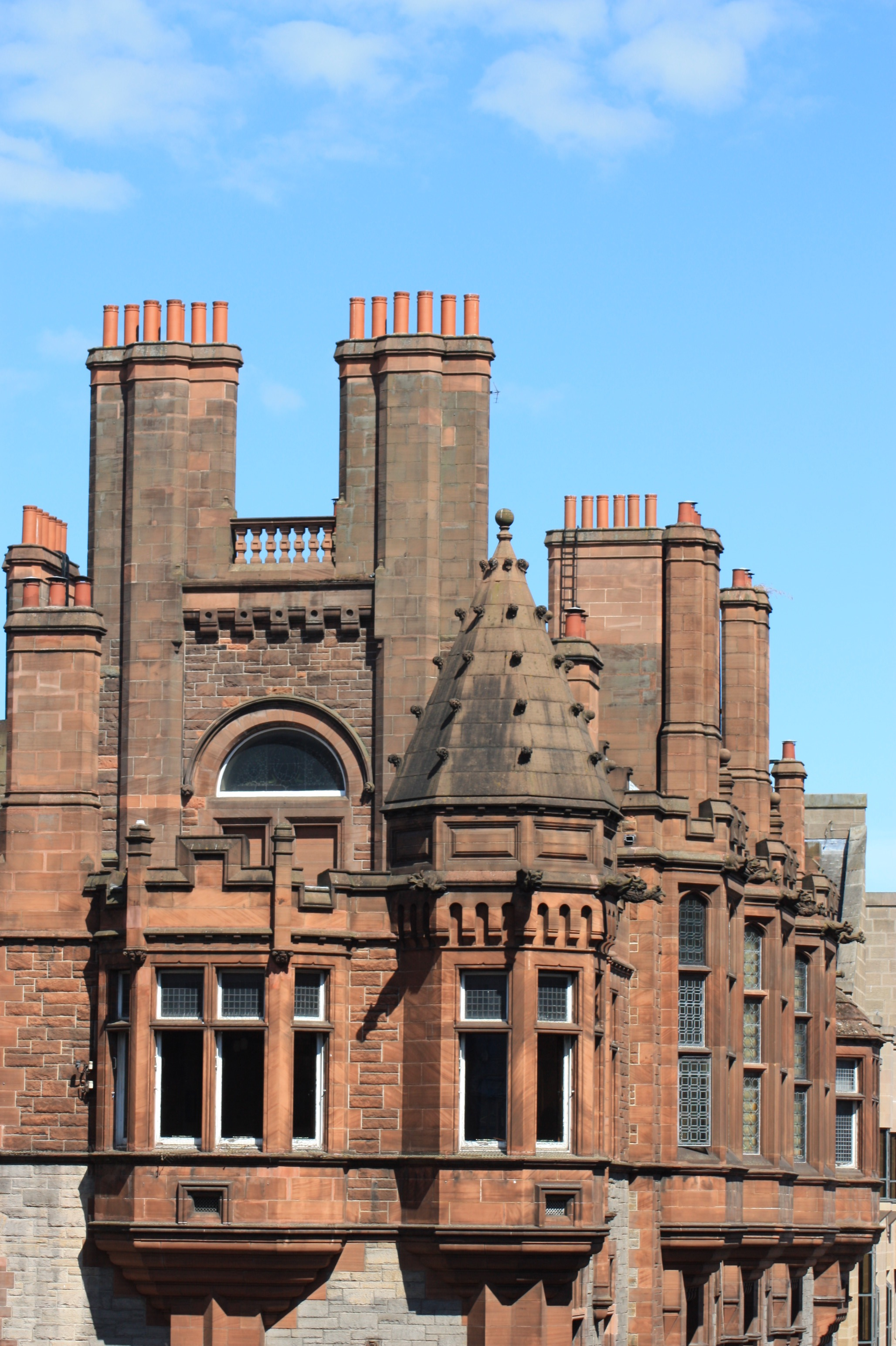
Solicitors Buildings, Cowgate, Edinburgh - rooftop details

- Solicitors Buildings, Cowgate (1888-1892) won in competition
- 13-17 St Mary Street (1889)
- 31 Barnton Avenue (1906)
- Kirk O’Field Church, Pleasance (1910–12)
- Carham Hall, Carham, 1920
- War Memorial, George Heriot’s School (1922)
- A new school for George Watson’s College his alma mater (1930)
