= Backhouse baronets =

Set index for Backhouse baronets

There have been two baronetcies created for persons with the surname Backhouse, once in the Baronetage of England and once in the Baronetage of the United Kingdom. As of 2026 one creation is extant.

- Backhouse baronets of London (1660): see Sir William Backhouse, 1st Baronet
- Backhouse baronets of Uplands and The Rookery (1901)
