= Gunter baronets =

Extinct baronetcy in the Baronetage of the United Kingdom

- Escutcheon of the Gunter baronets of Wetherby Grange
- Creation date: 1901
- Status: extinct
- Extinction date: 1980
- Seat: Wetherby Grange
- Arms: sable a chevron invected between two dexter gauntlets clenched in chief and a stag's head erased in base all or
- Crest: a dexter gauntlet clenched fesswise or surmounted by a stag's head erased proper

The Gunter baronetcy, of Wetherby Grange in the Parish of Collingham in the West Riding of the County of York, was a title in the Baronetage of the United Kingdom. It was created on 9 March 1901 for the army officer and Conservative politician Robert Gunter. The title became extinct on the death of the 3rd Baronet in 1980, who left no heir.

== Gunter baronets, of Wetherby Grange (1901) ==
- Sir Robert Gunter, 1st Baronet (1831–1905)
- Sir Robert Benyon Nevill Gunter, 2nd Baronet (1871–1917)
- Sir Ronald Vernon Gunter, 3rd Baronet (1904–1980)

Baronetage of the United Kingdom
Preceded by Backhouse baronets	Gunter baronets of Wetherby Grange; 9 March 1901	Succeeded by Portal baronets
