= Hannah Chapman Backhouse =

English diarist and Quaker minister

- Born: Hannah Chapman Gurney; 9 February 1787; Norwich, Norfolk
- Died: 6 May 1850 (aged 63); Darlington, County Durnham
- Occupations: Diarist; Minister for the Society of Friends
- Spouse: Jonathan Backhouse (married 1811)

Hannah Chapman Backhouse (née Gurney; 9 February 1787 – 6 May 1850) was an English diarist and Quaker minister. Her work in America was influential in strengthening evangelicalism in American Quakerism.

== Life ==
Hannah Chapman Gurney was born in Norwich on 2 February 1787 to Joseph and Jane Gurney (née Chapman). By birth, and later by marriage, she was connected to a financially powerful Quaker network which included the Barclay, Fox, Fry and Pease families. One cousin was Elizabeth Fry.

In 1811, she married Jonathan Backhouse, a banker and financier, and the couple settled at Darlington. They had three children who survived into adulthood: two daughters and a son.

== Quaker ministry ==
In 1820, Hannah Chapman Backhouse first spoke as a minister. In 1826, she visited Friends in Darlington, with Quaker minister Isaac Stephenson. She travelled with him to Manchester, Lancaster, and Leeds, and from this period onwards advanced rapidly in ministry, holding numerous public meetings. In 1827, Hannah and her husband spent two months visiting Devon, Cornwall, and the Scilly Isles. In 1829, they visited Ireland.

In 1830, she travelled to America, accompanied by her husband. She spent five years there, visiting many meetings of Friends. In 1933, Jonathan wrote:

I do think my wife's labours in these parts, have been of essential service; - helped some sunken ones out of a pit, strengthened some weak hands, and confirmed some wavering ones, as well as comforted the mourners. She has no cause to be discouraged about her labours, they have been blessed.

Aside from religious teaching, the Backhouses also focused on schooling and slavery. In Indiana, Hannah was “remembered... for her advocacy of First Day Scripture Schools, many of which were established with her encouragement”. Backhouse also recorded some resistance to her ministry, noting that "In a few places they refuse women’s preaching".

When Jonathan Backhouse returned to England, Hannah's companion became Eliza P. Kirkbride. She described Kirkbride as "a gay, animated young person, who, through a succession of afflictions, had become quite serious." Kirkbride and Backhouse travelled the southern states of the US, where Backhouse wrote about the evils of slavery.

== Later years ==
In 1835, they returned to England, and for the next ten years, Hannah continued to travel across England and Scotland. During this time, her eldest surviving son, aged 17, her husband, and a daughter all died.

During late 1849, her health began to decline. She died on 6 May 1850 at Polam Hall in Darlington.
