= Carham Hall =

Grade II listed building in Northumberland, England

Coordinates: 55°38′32″N 2°18′50″W

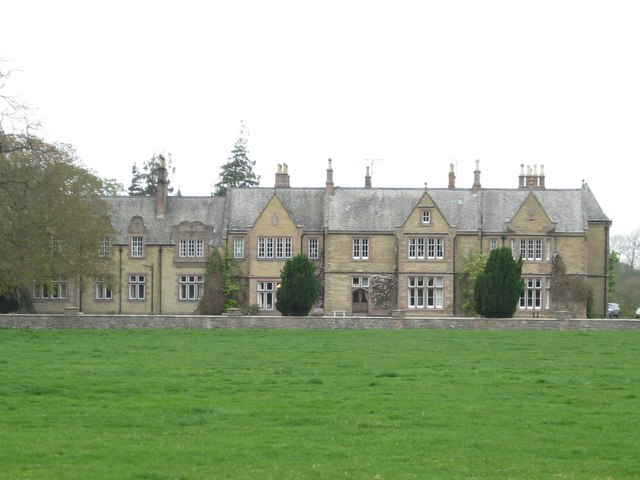
South elevation

Carham Hall is a grade II listed building near Carham in Northumberland, England. The site, on the Scottish border, was previously occupied by a medieval tower house, built as a defence from border reivers. The Compton family purchased the estate in 1754 and the following year erected the first Carham Hall, a relatively plain building in the Classical style. The hall passed to the Hodgson family and in 1870 Richard Hodgson-Huntley ordered it be rebuilt on a grander scale, in four bays. The hall and estate were afterwards owned by the Perkins family, a daughter of which, Nancy, married William Matthew Burrell in 1903. Nancy Burrell commissioned Scottish architect James Bow Dunn to extend the hall in 1920. This extension added a further four bays to the western end of the structure, creating a larger, linear building. The house was later owned by Sir Thomas Straker-Smith.

Carham Hall was granted protection as a listed building at some point in the 20th century but lost this in 1988. The building was in use as a care home by 2011 but this closed in February 2020. Carham Hall is now owned by Henry Straker-Smith who proposed to demolish it in 2021 and erect a modern house. After protests from The Victorian Society the building regained statutory protection as a grade II listed building, saving it from demolition.

== Description ==
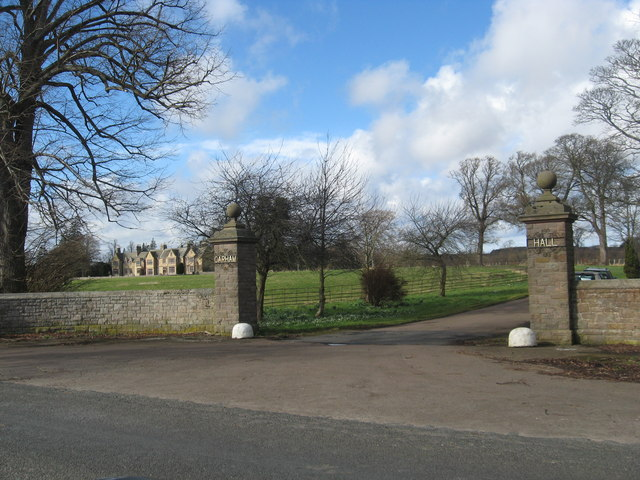
Modern view of the entrance gates with hall in background

Carham Hall and its associated estate lies in northern Northumberland immediately south of the River Tweed which, at this point, marks the modern border with Scotland (the border swings southwards, away from the Tweed west of Carham). The current hall has some Jacobethan styling but is demonstrative of the Scottish influence on this part of Northern England. It is described as a good example of the later work of architect James Bow Dunn, with subtle and elegant detailing. The structure is linear in nature, facing to the south to overlook the associated park. The hall is built of buff-coloured sandstone, dressed with pink sandstone; the roof is covered with Devonian flagstones. The windows have mullions and transoms. The roof has kneelers, ridged copings and multiple corniced chimney stacks on the ridge.

The main south elevation is of eight bays; the easternmost four correspond to the layout of the original Victorian Hall while the western four are the 1922 extension. The bays are irregularly sized and the hall is two storeys in height, plus an attic. There are four gables, none alike, but each having window of four lights and similar stone finial details. Outside of the gables windows are formed of two or three lights. The westernmost four bays have half-dormer windows with elaborate gables, especially in the fourth bay which has an elaborate stone apron. At the eastern end the original 1870 tower survives; the remains of the western tower (now in the centre of the building) can be seen only on the north elevation. The main entrance is in the sixth bay from the left and is through a Tudor arch above which is a two-light rectangular overlight. The north elevation consists of a number of bays, each with three gables, and a projecting lobby entrance. Attached to the hall on this elevation is an enclosed stableyard, accessed from its northern elevation via a four-centred arch flanked with stone piers.

The interior contains many early features salvaged from other structures. The wood panelling in the dining room dates to the 16th century and that of the entrance hall, panelled in the 20th century, may date to the 18th century; the panelling in the South Hall may also date from that period. Outside of the dining room the panelling is of a linenfold design. The overmantel is a mixture of 16th- and 20th-century work and a 16th-century panelled door, with medallion, survives in a modern door frame. The drawing room is in the style of Robert Adam with plaster panelling, cornices and ceiling. Elsewhere there are high-relief plaster friezes and a Jacobean-style ceiling with plaster ribs in a geometric pattern. The main staircase is reported to be impressive.

== History ==
=== Earlier structures ===
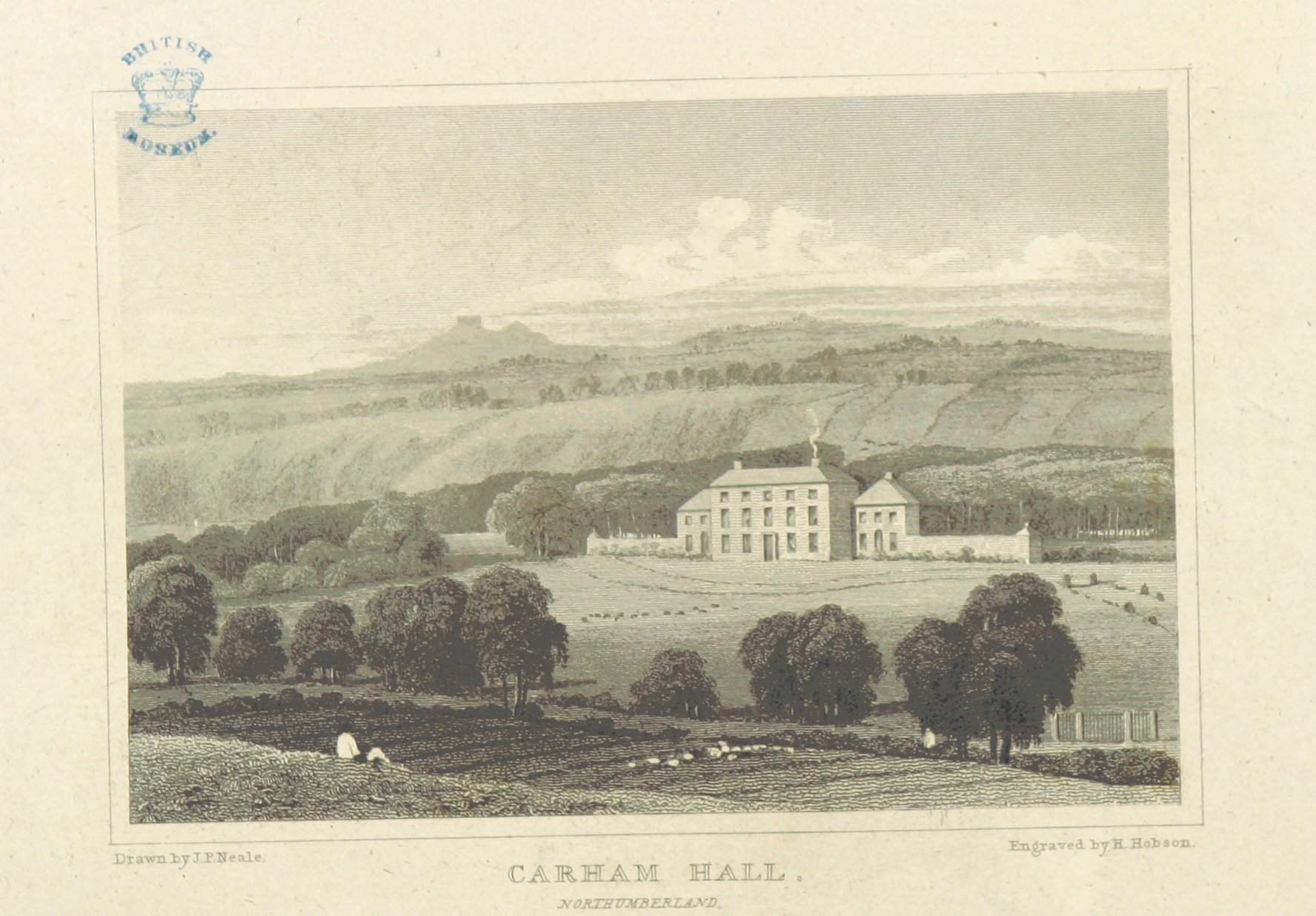
1818 drawing of the 1755 hall

A tower house was present on this site in the 13th century and survived until at least 1541. The tower would have provided a means of defence against the border reivers who operated in this area during this period. The estate was purchased by the Compton family in 1754 and they erected the first Carham Hall on the site in 1755. The structure is recorded in an engraving by J. P. Neale, published in 1818. Neale's engraving shows the structure was in the Classical style, though rather plain. It consisted of a three-storey central block with small, two-storey wings. The hall seems to have passed to the Hodgson family by the end of the century. A resident of the hall, Richard Hodgson, was responsible for designing St Cuthbert's Church in nearby Carham in 1790.

=== 1870 hall ===
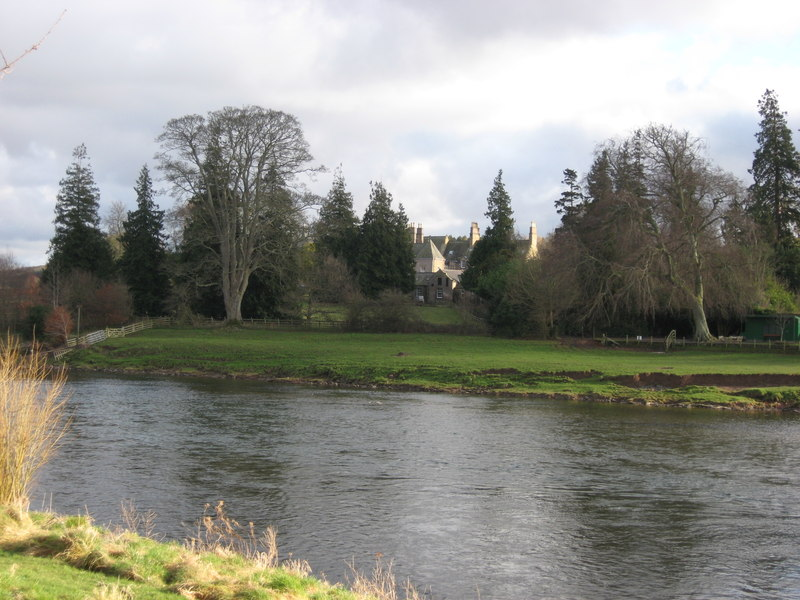
View from the north, across the Tweed

The estate passed to Richard Hodgson's grandson Richard Hodgson-Huntley, who was member of parliament for Tynemouth and North Shields and, later, for Berwick-upon-Tweed. He was also a director of the North British Railway and, from 1877, was High Sheriff of Northumberland. Hodgson-Huntley is thought to have ordered the rebuilding of Carham Hall in 1870, as a mark of his high social status.

The architect employed is not known but the works were carried out in the Tudor Revival style. A wall of the old structure may have been incorporated into the rear elevation of the new hall, as this wall is irregular. The new hall was rectangular in plan with gables on its rear elevation and towers at the east and west ends.

Carham Hall later came into the possession of Charles Perkins whose second daughter, Nancy, married William Matthew Burrell in 1903. The Burrells lived at the hall during the Edwardian era and carried out some works to it in the pre-war years, under the direction of architect James Bow Dunn (formerly of Dunn & Findlay). Dunn returned in 1920 to direct the construction of a significant extension to the west, according to the Pevsner Architectural Guides this work was carried out for Nancy Burrell and completed in 1922. Later in the 1920s the house and estate were sold to Sir Thomas Straker-Smith, who became High Sheriff of Northumberland in 1938. The hall became a grade II listed building but was delisted by the Department of the Environment in 1988, with no reason recorded.

=== Proposed demolition ===
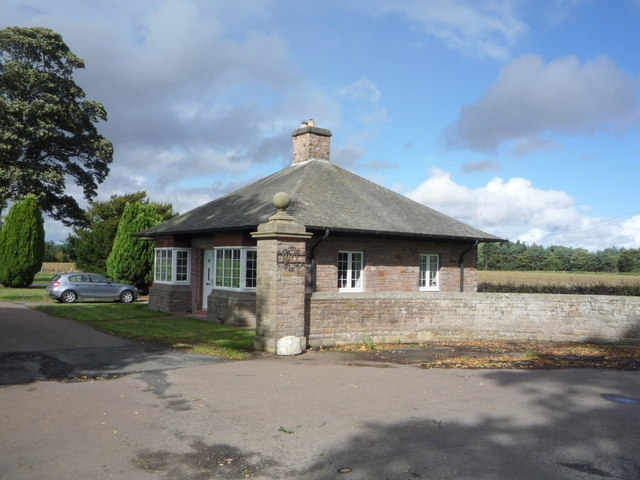
Lodge at road entrance

By 2011 the house was in use as a care home, specialising in dementia and elderly patients, with a capacity of 22 residents. The home was rated as sub-standard ("requires improvement") in 2019 and closed in February 2020. The hall was sold and by 2021 was owned by Henry Straker-Smith.

Straker-Smith claimed that it was "financially unviable to restore the existing buildings as a family home" due to structural problems and the presence of asbestos and claimed the empty building cost £5,000 per month to maintain. Straker-Smith proposed to demolish the structure and build a new family home on the site. Planning permission is not required to demolish non-listed structures in England outside of conservation areas but the local authority must approve the method of demolition to minimise dust and nuisance. Northumberland County Council confirmed they were powerless to prevent the demolition, which was scheduled to proceed in September 2021.

The Victorian Society, a conservation charity, described the hall as "a key local heritage asset" and campaigned against its demolition and for reform of the planning laws on demolition. The Victorian Society applied to Historic England (HE) for a review of the building's listed status. HE could find no reason that the structure's original listing status was removed and presumed it had been an error. Describing the structure as "a good example of an evolved English country house" in a "well-executed Tudor Revival design ... [with] a handsome principal elevation", they restored the hall to its original grade II listing on 23 April 2021. The Department for Digital, Culture, Media and Sport, the successor of the Department of the Environment in conservation matters, agreed with the decision to relist the structure.

The relisting grants the hall protection under the Planning (Listed Buildings and Conservation Areas) Act 1990 and would require an application for listed building consent for any future demolition. Such a consent should only be granted where there would be a substantial public benefit, in this case effectively safeguarding the structure. After the relisting The Victorian Society requested that Northumberland County Council work with Straker-Smith to find a suitable purpose for the hall, warning that there was a risk that it could be left to deteriorate until permission to demolish it was forthcoming.
