= Mary Dudley (Quaker) =

British Quaker Minister

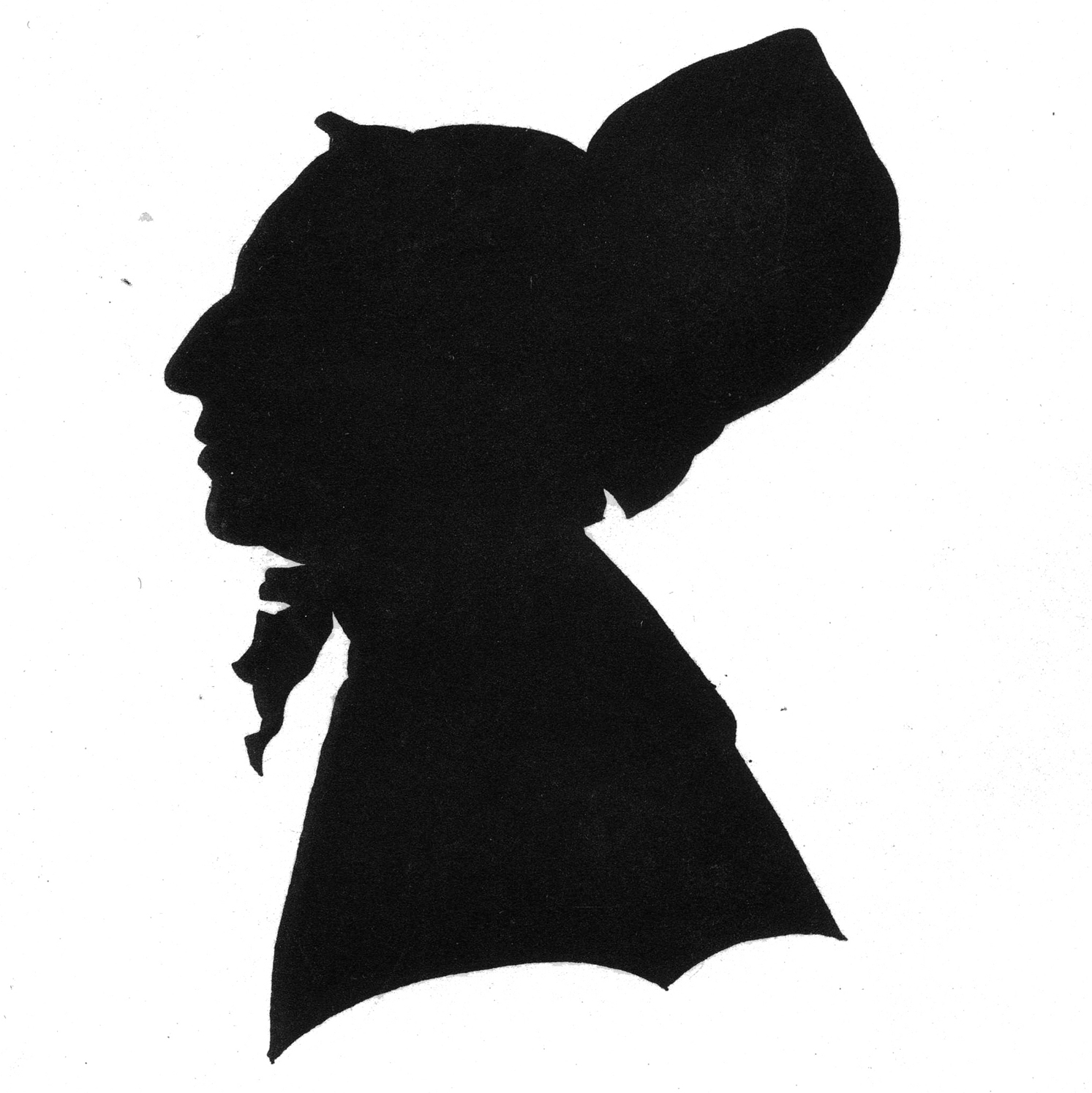
- from The Library of the Religious Society of Friends
- Born: Mary Stokes; 1750; Bristol
- Died: September 24, 1823 (aged 72–73)
- Known for: leading preacher
- Spouse: Robert Dudley
- Children: eight

Mary Dudley born Mary Stokes (1750 – September 24, 1823) was a British Quaker minister. Despite having four step children and five of her own children, Dudley, preached throughout Britain and Ireland. She was recognised as a role model because the freedom granted to her, as a woman, allowed her to achieve more.

== Life ==
Dudley was born in Bristol in 1750 into a family that may have had thirty members. Her family were so strong members of the Church of England, that when Dudley decided to follow the Quakers there was angry relatives and talk of disapprobation by John Wesley. She had joined the Methodist Society too, and Wesley had wanted her to be a leader. He wrote a troubled letter to her in 1772. Dudley was 21 and an adult and with her mother's support she defended her position and replied to Wesley.

She was already preaching when she became the third wife of Robert Dudley on 9 July 1777 and they lived in Frenchay. Her Irish husband had four children and their son Charles Stokes Dudley was born in 1780. She started preaching more widely in 1786 and by 1788 she was leaving her family to tour on the continent with a group of other Quakers. She continued to tour Britain and her preaching would attract considerable interest. In the early 1790s she was one of several Quaker preachers who evangelised throughout Ireland, but in 1796 ill health drove her to convalesce in Hotwells. She returned to Ireland and to work after a few weeks but by 1798 she was back convalescing in Bristol.

By 1807 she was living in Clonmel, she had three more children, but all of her step children had died and her husband also died. One consolation was that she was supported by a strong Quaker community in Clonmel.

== Death and legacy ==
She died in Peckham in 1823. In 1825 her autobiography "The life of Mary Dudley, with some account of the illness and death of her daughter, Hannah" was published after being edited by her daughter Elizabeth Dudley. Her daughter Elizabeth Dudley became a leading Quaker and her son Charles Stokes Dudley was active in the British and Foreign Bible Society. Charles' son Robert Charles Dudley was a noted artist.

In 1880 Matilda Sturge wrote about four leading Quaker women: Elizabeth Gurney Fry, Hannah Chapman Backhouse, Mary Dudley and her daughter Elizabeth Dudley. The book was titled Types of Quaker Womanhood and it was published by the Friends' Tract Association. The short work showed how Mary and the other Quaker women had contributed good works because they enjoyed less restrictions in their lives than many women.
