= Carham =

Village in Northumberland, England

Coordinates: 55.638232°N 2.322065°W

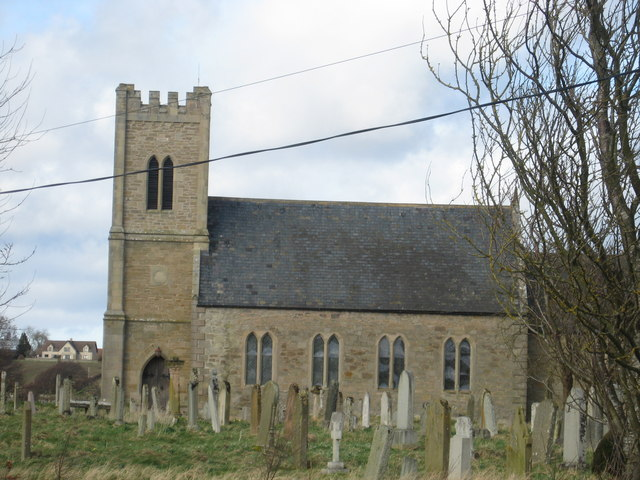
- St Cuthbert's church

- Location within Northumberland
- Population: 346 (2011 census)
- OS grid reference: NT795385
- Unitary authority: Northumberland
- Ceremonial county: Northumberland
- Region: North East
- Country: England
- Sovereign state: United Kingdom
- Post town: CORNHILL-ON-TWEED
- Postcode district: TD12
- Dialling code: 01890
- Police: Northumbria
- Fire: Northumberland
- Ambulance: North East
- UK Parliament: North Northumberland

Carham or Carham on Tweed is a village in Northumberland, England. The village lies on the south side of the River Tweed about 3 miles (5 km) west of Coldstream. According to the United Kingdom Census 2011, it is the place in England with greatest proportion of Scottish-born people, at approximately 33%.

== Etymology ==
Carham has generally been etymologised as an Old English place-name. The first syllable would be from carr 'rock', and the second either a dative plural ending (the whole name having been carrum '(at the) rocks') or the word hām ('homestead'). However, the twelfth-century chronicler Richard of Hexham appears not to have considered the name an English one, so it may actually come from Cumbric *kair 'fortification'.

== History ==
Near to Carham are the extensive remains of Early British camps and a bronze sword, now in the British Museum, discovered in the nearby Tweed.

Carham on the Tweed, where a stream divides Northumberland from Scotland, was the scene of two battles in Anglo-Saxon times.

In 833 the Danes fought the English, and the English were routed. Leland tells us that

in the 33rd year of Ecbright the Danes arrived at Lindisfarne and fought with the English at Carham where Eleven Bishops and two English Countes were slayne, and a great numbre of people.

A field between the glebe and Dunstan Wood, where bones have been from time to time disinterred, is probably the site of the battle.

In 1018 the Battle of Carham between the Kingdom of Scotland and the Northumbrians resulted in a Scottish victory. The fact that the Tweed is the border between Scotland and England can be traced to the outcome of this battle.

James VI of Scotland crossed the border on 26 April 1588 and visited Carham.

== Carham Hall ==
Carham Hall, located NE of the hamlet, was a 14th Century tower house built to defend against border reivers. The first house was built by the Compton family in 1755. It was extended by Richard Hodgson-Huntley in 1870 and again by architect James Bow Dunn in 1920.

== Governance ==
Carham is in the parliamentary constituency of North Northumberland.

== Religious sites ==
The church is dedicated to St Cuthbert.

== Notable people ==
- John Stark CBE KPM (1865–1940), a British police officer, Assistant Commissioner of the City of London Police from 1925 to 1933.
