= Sir John Ritchie Findlay, 1st Baronet =

Scottish newspaper owner and philanthropist

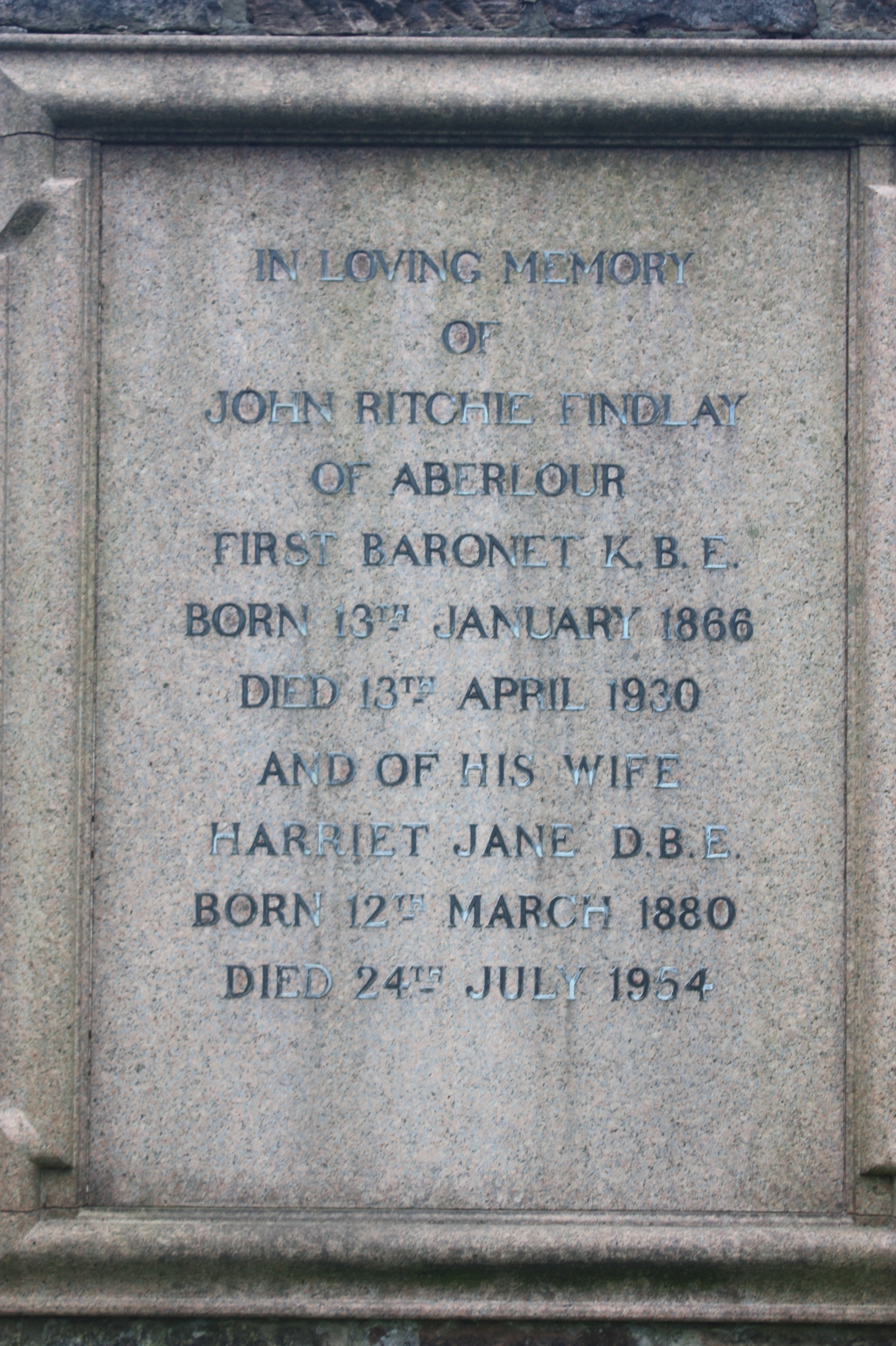
The grave of John Ritchie Findlay, Dean Cemetery

Sir John Ritchie Findlay, 1st Baronet, KBE, DL, FRSE (13 January 1866 – 13 April 1930) was a Scottish businessmen and philanthropist who owned the newspaper The Scotsman. He later in life served as Lord Lieutenant of Banffshire.

== Family and education ==
John Ritchie Findlay was born in Edinburgh, the eldest son of J. Ritchie Findlay, of Aberlour, and Susan (née Leslie). His father was a great-nephew of the founder of The Scotsman, so on his father's death in 1898, he became the principal partner in Messrs. John Ritchie and Co., the proprietors and publishers of The Scotsman and its associated newspapers.

He was educated first at Mr Oliphant's School on Charlotte Square then the Edinburgh Collegiate School before going to Harrow School in 1879, where he was a contemporary of Stanley Baldwin and of John Galsworthy. From Harrow he passed to Balliol College, Oxford, where he graduated MA with double honours, in Natural Science and in Literae Humaniores. Edinburgh University later gave him an honorary doctorate (LLD).

He was a breeder of pedigree Aberdeen Angus cattle on his family estate at Aberlour.

In 1898 he was elected a Fellow of the Royal Society of Edinburgh. His proposers were John McLaren, Lord McLaren, Sir Arthur Mitchell, Sir John Batty Tuke, and Ralph Copeland.

He was Master of the Merchant Company of Edinburgh 1913-14. He sat on the Ancient Monuments Board and the Fine Art Commission for Scotland. He had a large private collection of scientific instruments.

Findlay died at his residence, 3 Rothesay Terrace in Edinburgh, survived by his wife, three sons and two daughters. His heir was his eldest son Edmund Findlay.

He is buried on the northern wall of the 20th-century extension to Dean Cemetery, Edinburgh in the modern equivalent of the "Lords Row" as found in the original cemetery.

== Family ==
In 1901 he married Harriet Jane, daughter of Sir Jonathon Backhouse, of Darlington. Their eldest son was Edmund Findlay.

== Obituary ==
Sir John Findlay was an enlightened and progressive newspaper proprietor with a high ideal of the moral responsibility of the Press to the public. His newspaper interests, however, absorbed only part of his activities. He never entered the competitive arena of local or national politics, but his services were much sought after on semi-public administrative boards and public committees, and he gave of himself in that work. Findlay was particularly interested in the furtherance and encouragement of art and archaeology, in which he followed in the footsteps of is father, the donor to the nation of the Scottish National Portrait Gallery in Edinburgh. Sir John was Chairman of the Board of Trustees for the National Galleries of Scotland, and for a long time Chairman of the Edinburgh College of Art. His antiquarian interests found an outlet in his position as Vice-Chairman of the Scottish Ancient Monuments Board, and he was also an original member of the Royal Fine Art Commission for Scotland. He gave useful service to Scottish education as a member of the Advisory Council to the Scottish Education Department, and he undertook a very heavy task a few years ago when he became Chairman of the Scottish Advisory Committee on the Rivers Pollution.

On the outbreak of World War I he was invited by the Government to become Chairman of the Scottish National Housing Company, which was entrusted with the construction of housing at Rosyth, then the new naval base. Sir John's success in this enterprise led to his being asked by the last Unionist Government to form a company to accelerate house building in Scotland by the construction of steel houses. Many of these activities he was carrying on simultaneously — a heavy burden even for a stronger man physically. He never complained, however and his ability and self-sacrificing zeal won him not only the admiration but the personal esteem and good will of is colleagues and all who were brought into contact with him. Reserved and reticent, he never sought publicity, but many knew him as the soul of honour and integrity, as a man on whose judgment and discretion they could implicitly rely. Lady Findlay ably supported her husband in his public work and was herself Chairman of the Scottish Unionist Association two years ago, the first woman to hold that office.

Sir John was appointed a Knight Commander of the Order of the British Empire (KBE) in 1917 and created a Baronet, of Aberlour in the County of Banff, in 1925. After fulfilling the role of Deputy Lieutenant, in 1928 he was appointed to Lord Lieutenant of Banffshire, the county in which Aberlour, the family estate is situated. He was an honorary Royal Scottish Academy and an honorary LL.D. of Edinburgh University.

Honorary titles
Preceded by The Duke of Richmond	Lord Lieutenant of Banffshire; 1928–1930	Succeeded by James Archibald
Baronetage of the United Kingdom
New creation	Baronet (of Aberlour); 1925–1930	Succeeded by Edmund Findlay
