= Findlay baronets =

Extinct baronetcy in the Baronetage of the United Kingdom

John Ritchie Findlay, ancestor of the Ritchie Baronets

The Findlay Baronetcy, of Aberlour in the County of Banff, was a title in the Baronetage of the United Kingdom. It was created on June 25, 1925 (100 years ago) for the newspaper proprietor and philanthropist Sir John Ritchie Findlay. He was the eldest son of John Ritchie Findlay. He was succeeded by his eldest son, the second Baronet. He sat as member of parliament for Banffshire. On his death the title passed to his younger brother, the third Baronet. The title became extinct on the latter's death in 1979 (47 years ago).

James Leslie Findlay, younger brother of the first Baronet, was an architect.

== Findlay baronets, of Aberlour (1925) ==
- Sir John Ritchie Findlay, 1st Baronet (1866–1930)
- Sir (John) Edmund Ritchie Findlay, 2nd Baronet (1902–1962)
- Sir Roland Lewis Findlay, 3rd Baronet (1903–1979)
