= John Findlay (footballer) =

Scottish footballer

Personal information
- Full name: John Findlay
- Place of birth: Kilmaurs, Scotland
- Date of death: 25 September 1916
- Place of death: Pas-de-Calais, France
- Position: Right half

Senior career*
Years	Team	Apps	(Gls)
–1905	Knibshill United		
1905–1906	Newcastle United	2	(0)
1906–1909	Vale of Leven	52	(9)
1909–1910	Airdrieonians	20	(0)
1910–1911	Vale of Leven	8	(0)
- * Club domestic league appearances and goals

John Findlay, also known as Jack Findlay or Jock Findlay (died 25 September 1916), was a Scottish professional footballer who played in the Scottish League for Vale of Leven and Airdrieonians as a right half. He also played in the Football League for Newcastle United.

== Personal life ==
After the outbreak of the First World War, Findlay enlisted as a private in the Scots Guards in Girvan and died of wounds in France on 25 September 1916. He was buried in Bienvillers Military Cemetery.

== Career statistics ==
Appearances and goals by club, season and competition
Club	Season	League			National Cup		Total	
Club	Season	Division	Apps	Goals	Apps	Goals	Apps	Goals
Newcastle United	1905–06	First Division	2	0	0	0	2	0
Vale of Leven	1906–07	Scottish Second Division	17	1	0	0	17	1
Vale of Leven	1907–08	Scottish Second Division	20	3	4	0	24	3
Vale of Leven	1908–09	Scottish Second Division	15	5	9	0	24	5
Vale of Leven	Total		52	9	13	0	65	9
Airdrieonians	1909–10	Scottish Second Division	20	0	2	0	22	0
Vale of Leven	1910–11	Scottish Second Division	8	0	2	0	10	0
Vale of Leven	Total		60	9	15	0	75	9
Career total			82	9	17	0	99	9
