= Robert Charles Dudley =

British painter

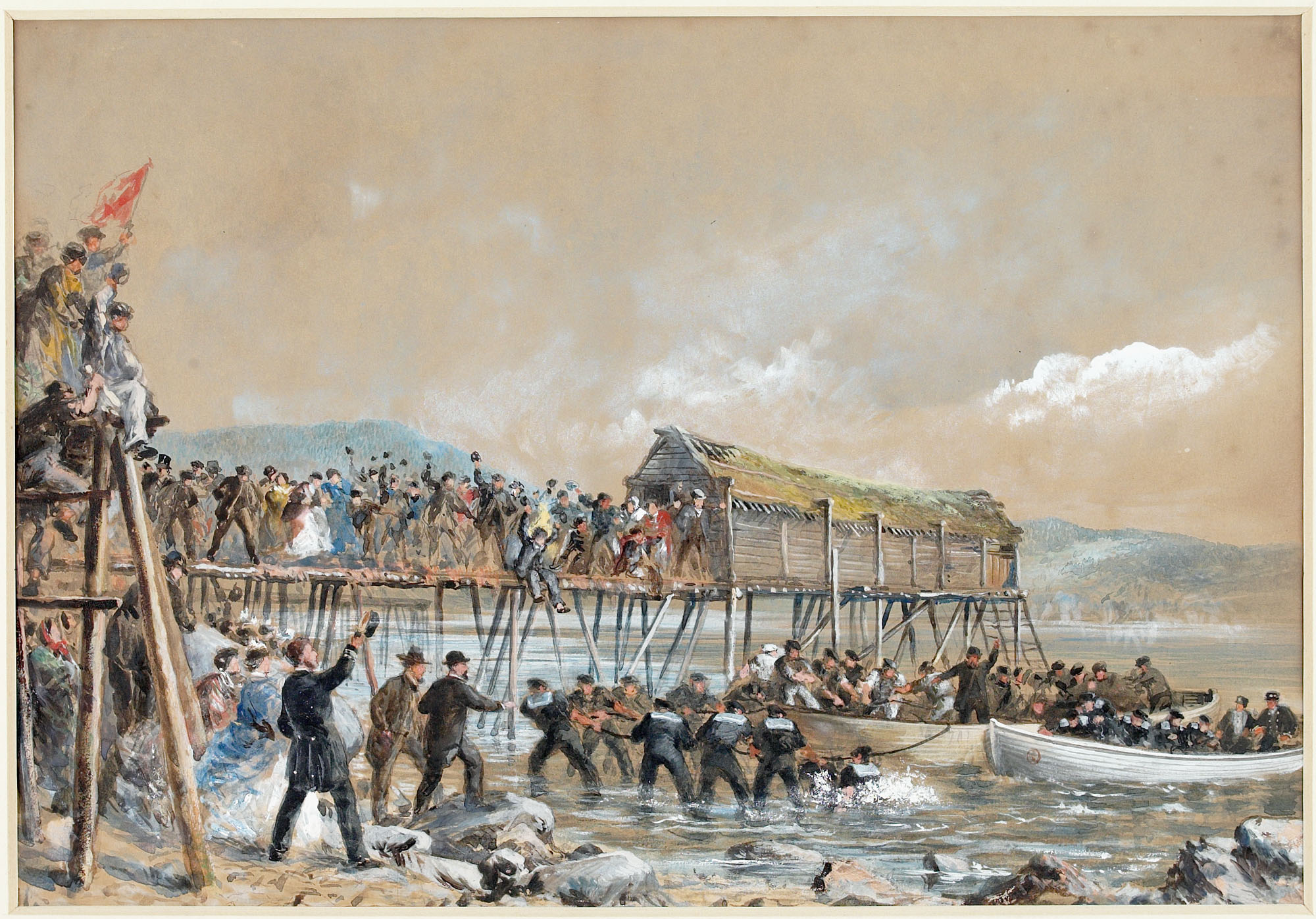
Landing of the Transatlantic telegraph cable of 1866, Heart's Content, Newfoundland, by Robert Charles Dudley, 1866.

Robert Charles Dudley (1826 – 28 April 1909) was a British watercolourist and lithographer.

== Life ==
Dudley was born in 1826 and his father was Charles Stokes Dudley, his grandfather was Irish and his grandmother was the Quaker minister Mary Dudley.

== Links ==
- Robert Charles Dudley, Sciencemuseum
- Robert Charles Dudley collection at MET
- Robert Charles Dudley at National Portrait Gallery, London
