= Craig Findlay =

New Zealand cricketer (born 1971)

Craig Owen Findlay (born 17 August 1971 in Waipukurau, Hawke's Bay) is a former New Zealand cricketer who played for the Central Districts Stags in the 1990s and the CEO of Hawke's Bay Cricket Association. He also played for Hawke's Bay in the Hawke Cup.

Findlay now runs the Hawke's Bay branch of a company providing sporting programmes for schools.

== Controversy ==
Findlay was widely criticised in January 2014 for scoring 307 runs off 115 balls after being dropped on 40, against a school cricket team of 15- and 16-year-olds competing in a senior men's division. A member of the public said, "That CEO should be nurturing these players not trying to show off and have his score on back page."
