= Edmund Findlay =

Scottish politician and baronet

- Born: 14 June 1902
- Died: 6 September 1962 (aged 60); Bermuda, West Indies
- Education: Balliol College, Oxford
- Spouse: Margaret Jean Graham
- Parents: Sir John Ritchie Findlay (father); Dame Harriet Findlay (mother)

Sir (John) Edmund (Ritchie) Findlay, 2nd Baronet FRSE (14 June 1902 – 6 September 1962) was a Scottish politician and baronet. He was Member of Parliament (MP) for Banffshire from 1935 to 1945.

== Life ==
He was the eldest son of Sir John Ritchie Findlay, 1st Baronet, and Dame Harriet Findlay (DBE) (born Harriet Jane Backhouse). He was educated at Harrow School and then attended university at Balliol College, Oxford, graduating BA.

He married Margaret Jean Graham.

Like his father and grandfather, John Ritchie Findlay, he was proprietor of The Scotsman newspaper.

He succeeded his father to the baronetcy in 1930 and was in turn succeeded by his brother, Lt.-Col. Roland Lewis Findlay.

In 1932, he was elected a Fellow of the Royal Society of Edinburgh. His proposers were James Watt, Robert Grant, Sir Edward Albert Sharpey-Schafer and James Hartley Ashworth.

He was Unionist Member of Parliament (MP) for Banffshire from 1935 to 1945.

In 1953, he sold The Scotsman newspaper to Roy Thomson, 1st Baron Thomson of Fleet, ending the long connection between the Findlay family and the newspaper.

He died on 6 September 1962 in Bermuda in the West Indies.

Parliament of the United Kingdom
Preceded by Murdoch McKenzie Wood	Member of Parliament for Banffshire; 1935–1945	Succeeded by William Duthie
Baronetage of the United Kingdom
Preceded by John Ritchie Findlay	Baronet (of Aberlour); 1930–1962	Succeeded by Roland Lewis Findlay
