= Alexander Findlay =

Alexander Findlay may refer to:

- Alexander Findlay (politician) (1844–1921), Scottish politician
- Alexander Findlay (British Army officer) (fl. 1820s and 1830s), British Army officer and colonial governor
- Alexander George Findlay (1812–1875), English geographer and hydrographer
- Alexander Findlay, prisoner on St. Michael of Scarborough
- Alexander Findlay (golfer) (1866–1942), Scottish-American golfer

== See also ==
- Alex Finlay, Australian politician
- Alexander Struthers Finlay (1807–1886), Scottish politician
