= Unionist Party (Scotland) =

Former centre-right political party in Scotland

- Founded: 1912
- Dissolved: 1965
- Preceded by: Conservative Party; Liberal Unionist Party
- Merged into: Scottish Conservatives
- Ideology: Conservatism; British unionism; British imperialism; Scottish regionalism
- Political position: Centre-right
- National affiliation: Conservative Party

The Unionist Party was the main centre-right political party in Scotland between 1912 and 1965.

Independent of, although associated with, the Conservative Party in England and Wales, it stood for election at different periods of its history in alliance with a few Liberal Unionist and National Liberal candidates. Those who became members of parliament (MPs) would take the Conservative Whip at Westminster as the Ulster Unionists did until 1972. At Westminster, the differences between the Scottish Unionist and the English party could appear blurred or non-existent to the external casual observer, especially as many Scottish MPs were prominent in the parliamentary Conservative Party. Examples include party leaders Bonar Law (1911–1921 and 1922–1923) and Sir Alec Douglas-Home (1963–1965), both of whom served as Prime Minister of the United Kingdom.

The party traditionally did not stand at the local government level but it instead supported and assisted the Progressive Party in its campaigns against the Labour Party. This relationship ended when the Conservatives started fielding their own candidates, who stood against both Labour and the Progressives.

== Origins ==
The origins of the Scottish Unionist Party lie in the 1886 split of the Liberal Party and the emergence of the Liberal Unionists under Joseph Chamberlain. The union in question was the 1800 Irish Union, not the Scottish Union of 1707. Before this, the Tory party in Scotland had never achieved parity with the dominant Whig and Scottish Liberal ascendancy since the election reforms of 1832. The Liberal Unionists quickly agreed to an electoral pact with the Tories, and in Scotland this overcame the former electoral dominance of the Scottish Liberals.

After the 1912 merger of Liberal Unionists and Conservatives as the Conservative and Unionist Party, the Scottish Unionist Party effectively acted as the Conservative Party in Scotland, although some candidates still stood on a Liberal Unionist ticket because of the latent appeal of the word "Liberal" in Scotland.

== Ethos and appeal ==
Map of the results of the 1931 general election in Scotland; when the Unionists won a record 66% of Scottish seats. Conservative/Unionist Labour Liberal National Liberal Independent Labour Party

Popular imperial unity was the central thread of the Scottish Unionist Party's belief system. While the Scottish Unionist party was linked on a Parliamentary level with the Conservative Party in England and Wales, it was conscious that it had to appeal to the liberal tradition in Scotland, and so until 1965; it studiously avoided using the term "Conservative". For example, it used Conservative Party literature but changed the word 'Conservative' to 'Unionist'.

The party built up significant working-class support by emphasising the connection between the Union, the Empire, and the fate of local industry. Unity across the classes was often cited as one of the party's planks of unionism. Along with this protectionism, Protestantism also played an important part in the party's working-class appeal. Although not explicitly articulated by the party, lest it alienate what small but wealthy middle and upper-class Catholic support it had, this appeal was projected through the endorsement and promotion of well-known Church of Scotland members like John Buchan, or prominent Orangemen in areas of west and central Scotland where the Grand Orange Lodge of Scotland had strong support. Prominent Orangemen included Sir John Gilmour, the intermittent Secretary for Scotland in the 1920s and Home Secretary in the 1930s. Some saw this as an anti-Catholic appointment; however, it was Gilmour who, as the Secretary for Scotland, repudiated the Church of Scotland's highly controversial report entitled "The Menace of the Irish Race to our Scottish Nationality".

Being an independent Scottish party also drew electoral appeal when set against the threat of a London-based centralising Labour Party. A crucial aspect of this, particularly in the 1940s and 1950s, was the ability to place an "alien" identity upon Labour by successfully using the term "Socialist" to describe the Labour Party. This distinctively Scottish appeal was further strengthened when combined with opposition to the Labour Party's post-war nationalisation programme, which centralised control (in London) of former Scottish-owned businesses and council-run services. The strong Scottish character of the party was even evident in relations with Conservative government ministers, when, for example, Lord Glendevon admitted he would be at odds with Scotland's Unionist Party for refusing the post of Secretary of State for Scotland because he preferred to remain at Westminster.

The party's campaigns reflected their desire to reconcile the themes of individualism and collectivism in their appeal to potential Labour voters. This projected an image of flexibility and pragmatism when they expressed their support for the synthesis of "two fundamental ideas of human individuality and of service to others and to the community."

== Electoral record and the 1955 general election ==
Map of the results of the 1955 general election in Scotland; often cited as a high point for the Unionist Party. Conservative/Unionist Labour Liberal National Liberal

With the Liberal Party divided and declining, the Scottish Unionist Party managed to attract former Liberal voters during this period – sometimes with candidates standing on a Liberal Unionist ticket. The creation of the National Liberals also helped increase the Unionist vote.

Within this context, their support grew, and the emergence of the Labour Party as a threat to the middle-classes resulted in the Scottish Unionists gaining a majority of Scottish seats at the 1924 general election, with 37 out of Scotland's 73 seats. Suffering a setback in 1929, they reasserted themselves at the 1931 general election during an electoral backlash against the Labour Party that resulted in the creation of the National Government. The Scottish Unionist Party won 79% of the Scottish seats that year, 58 out of 73. In 1935, they returned a reduced majority of 45 MPs.

This remained the case until Labour's landslide victory at the 1945 general election. The Unionists won only 30 of the 71 seats in Scotland. At the 1950 general election, a majority of Labour MPs was returned again, but the Scottish Unionist Party closed the gap by returning 32 MPs. At the subsequent Conservative election victory the following year, an equal number of Labour and Unionist MPs were returned from Scotland, 35, with Jo Grimond of the Liberal Party retaining the Orkney and Shetland seat.

With Church of Scotland membership peaking at 1,300,000 in 1955 – or over one-quarter of Scotland's population – the 1955 general election brought unparalleled success as the party gained 50.1% of the vote and 36 of the 71 seats at Westminster. Often cited as the only party to achieve a majority of the Scottish vote, six of the Conservative and Unionist MPs were returned that year under the label of Liberal Unionist or National Liberal. This apparent success was the prelude to a number of events that weakened the appeal of both the Scottish Unionist Party and the Scottish Conservatives that followed.

== Merger with the Conservative Party ==
Following electoral defeat when the Party lost six seats in Scotland at the 1964 United Kingdom general election, reforms in April 1965 brought an end to the Scottish Unionist Party as an independent force. It was renamed "Scottish Conservative and Unionist Party" that constitutionally then came under the control of the mainstream UK party. These, and further reforms in 1977, saw the Scottish Conservatives transformed into a regional unit, with its personnel, finances, and political offices under the control of the party leadership in London.

== Consequences of merger ==
As the British Empire came to an end, so too did the primacy of Protestant associations, as secularism and ecumenism rose. The decline of strictly Protestant associations, and the loss of its Protestant working-class base, spelled the erosion of the Unionist vote. Though many Conservatives would still identify with the Kirk, most members of the established Church of Scotland did not identify themselves as Conservatives.

With the Daily Record newspaper switching from endorsing the Unionists to the Labour Party, the Conservative Party in the 1960s was mercilessly portrayed as a party of the Anglicised aristocracy. Combined with the new name, this helped turn previous Unionist voters to the Labour Party and the SNP, which advanced considerably at the two general elections of February and October 1974.

The relations between the Scottish Conservatives with the largely working-class Orange Order also became problematic because of the perceived aristocratic connection of the former, but it was The Troubles in Northern Ireland that created more concrete problems. On one level, there was the residual perception of a connection that many mainstream Protestant voters associated with the sectarian violence in Northern Ireland – a perception that is unfair to a large extent since the Scottish Orange Order has dealt more stringently with members associating with Loyalist paramilitaries than its Northern Irish equivalent. However, the ramifications of this perception also led to the Scottish Conservative Party downplaying and ignoring past associations, which further widened the gap with the Orange Order. Any links that lingered were ultimately broken when Prime Minister Margaret Thatcher signed the Anglo-Irish Agreement. This event witnessed Orange Lodges (amongst other supporters) setting up their own Scottish Unionist Party.

== Electoral performance ==
This chart shows the electoral results of the Scottish Unionist Party, from its first general election contested in 1918, to its last in 1964. Total number of seats, and vote percentage, is for Scotland only.

Election	Vote %	Seats	Outcome of election
1918	30.8%	28 / 73	'Coalition' Conservative Hung Parliament / 'Coalition' Liberal Victory
1922	25.1%	13 / 73	Conservative Victory (Unionist Prime Minister)
1923	31.6%	14 / 73	Conservative Hung Parliament
1924	40.7%	36 / 73	Conservative Victory
1929	35.9%	20 / 73	Labour Hung Parliament
1931	49.5%	48 / 73	Conservative Victory
1935	42.0%	35 / 73	National Government (Conservative) Victory
1945	36.7%	24 / 71	Labour Victory
1950	37.2%	26 / 71	Labour Victory
1951	39.9%	29 / 71	Conservative Victory
1955	41.5%	30 / 71	Conservative Victory (Unionists & National Liberal total was 50.1% of the vote and 36 seats)
1959	39.8%	25 / 71	Conservative Victory
1964	37.3%	24 / 71	Labour Victory (Unionist Prime Minister)

== Party Chairmen ==
- George Younger, 1916–1923
- The Marquess of Linlithgow, 1924–1926
- Harriet Findlay, 1928
- John Craik-Henderson
- Viscount Stuart of Findhorn, 1950–1962
- Michael Noble, 1962–1963
- Sir John George, 1963–1965
- John Gilmour, 1965–1967
