= James Leslie Findlay =

Scottish architect and soldier (1868-1952)

- Born: April 1868
- Died: September 1952 (aged 84)
- Occupation: architect

James Leslie Findlay (30 April 1868 – 19 September 1952) was a Scottish architect and soldier.

James Leslie Findlay was the younger son of John Ritchie Findlay and Susan Leslie. He practised as an architect in Edinburgh between 1885 and 1915. Initially apprenticed to A G Sydney Mitchell, he went into partnership with James Bow Dunn in 1894. The Dunn & Findlay partnership's most notable building is probably The Scotsman building in Edinburgh's North Bridge, begun in 1898, now The Scotsman Hotel.

Findlay served in the Great War, reaching the rank of Lt Colonel, commanding the First Lowland Brigade of the Royal Field Artillery in France. Invalided out of the Army he did not resume his architectural career, but retired to the house in Craigellachie, Banffshire, that he had built for himself and his family.

He died on 19 September 1952.

Many papers and drawings of the Dunn & Findlay partnership are held by the Royal Commission on the Ancient and Historical Monuments of Scotland in Edinburgh.
