= Backhouse's Bank =

Backhouse's Bank (James & Jonathan Backhouse and Co., from 1798 Jonathan Backhouse and Co.) was founded in 1774 in Darlington, County Durham, England, by James Backhouse (1720–1798), a wealthy Quaker flax dresser and linen manufacturer, and his sons Jonathan (1747–1826) and James (1757–1804).

Jonathan Backhouse succeeded his father as senior partner, and was in turn succeeded by his son, also named Jonathan (1779–1842), his grandson Edmund Backhouse, Member of Parliament for Darlington, and his great-grandson Sir Jonathan Edmund Backhouse. Under Sir Jonathan's management Backhouse's Bank merged in 1896 with Gurney's Bank of Norwich and Barclays of London and others to form what is now Barclays Bank.

== History ==
Originally James Backhouse offered banking services as a sideline to the linen business, before he established a separate banking business. The bank was well placed to serve the increasing capital requirements of industrial development in the North of England. Though not related to the Southern Quaker banking families such as Barclay, Gurney and Bevan, their Quaker background still gave them a ready business alliance with Southern houses. In time these alliances were reinforced by marriage and Backhouse's became one of the strongest banks in the North of England.

The 1790s and the first three decades of the nineteenth century saw a series of banking crises in England. Many banks saw runs on their banknotes and deposits, and many failed. The banknotes of the time were issued by private banks as a promise to redeem the note for coin on demand, but most banks relied on their notes being used as a de facto currency and issued more than they could redeem if everyone who held them demanded payment. At the same time, gold reserves in England were heavily depleted by government spending in the French Revolutionary Wars and Napoleonic Wars, so that even the Bank of England had to suspend redemption of its notes from 1797 to 1821. Backhouse's Bank used both their reserves and their relationships with London banks to honour their notes through these periods. However, their distance from London (the main market that could supply gold currency) caused difficulties. Supplies were obtained by partners travelling to London by post, but secrecy had to be preserved to maintain confidence in the bank's liquidity. In 1819, Lord Darlington, as part of a long-running dispute with the Backhouse family, began amassing their banknotes by requiring his tenants to pay their rent using them. He intended to present a large quantity of notes all at once, more than could be redeemed on the spot, and so break the bank. Jonathan Backhouse was warned of the plot and travelled quickly to London to obtain a large amount of gold. While returning to Darlington the wheel of his carriage broke, but rather than lose time, he stacked the gold so as to balance the carriage on its three wheels and continued on his way. Lord Darlington's notes were all redeemed for cash.

Despite these challenges, Backhouse's was able to take advantage of the failures of other banks to expand into their former markets, for instance in Sunderland and Durham. By 1825, Backhouse's reliability through multiple crises made its notes the preferred currency for trade in County Durham, even over those of the Bank of England.

The bank was heavily involved in the formation of the Stockton & Darlington Railway.

In 1896, Backhouse's was the third largest (after Barclay of London and Gurney's of Norwich) of twelve houses that united to form the joint-stock bank Barclay & Co, which at its formation held around one quarter of deposits in English private banks. At the time, Backhouse's had 20 branches and managed £3.3 million in deposits, with £250,000 capital and reserves.
