= Jonathan Backhouse (1779–1842) =

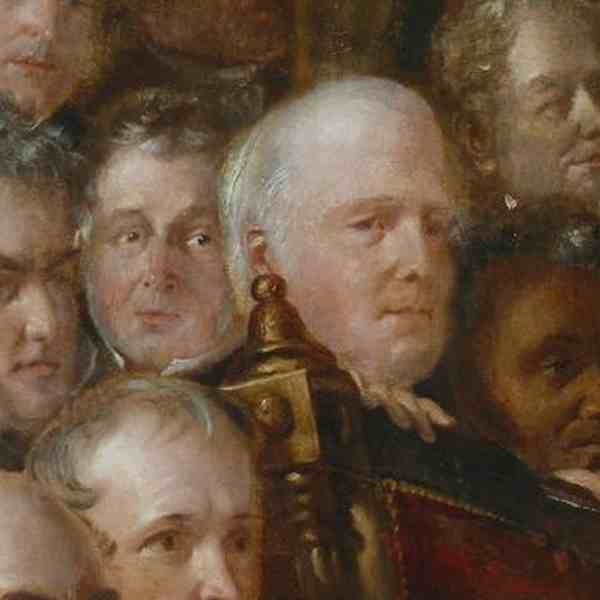
- left to right:Stephen Lushington, Sir John Eardley-Wilmot, Jonathan Backhouse with L.C. Lecesne and others in 1840.
- Born: 19 January 1779
- Died: 7 October 1842 (aged 63)
- Occupation: Banker
- Known for: Bankers to the Stockton and Darlington Railway
- Spouse: Hannah Chapman

Jonathan Backhouse (19 January 1779 – 7 October 1842) was a third generation banker from Darlington. He is known for financing the Stockton to Darlington Railway. He was married to the Quaker preacher Hannah Chapman Backhouse.

== Biography ==
Backhouse was the son of Jonathan Backhouse (1747–1826) and his wife Ann (1746–1826) daughter of Edward Pease (1711–1785) of Darlington. After his father died, Backhouse took over what was to become Backhouse's Bank. In 1811 he married Hannah Chapman Gurney who had connection to several important Quaker families.

Backhouse was involved with financing the Stockton and Darlington Railway. He raised £125,000. Twenty thousand pounds were from his own resources and the largest contribution of £80,000 came from his Quaker banker contacts. A story is told that when the Earl of Darlington's plot to bankrupt the Backhouse bank was discovered, Backhouse went to London to obtain gold to provide additional and urgent collateral. The plot was due to the Earl's anger that the new railway, financed by Backhouses's bank, was causing problems with the Earl's fox hunting. Backhouse was racing back to Darlington when he lost a wheel. It is said that he was able to continue the journey by moving the gold so that the chaise was still balanced and he was able to complete the journey with the wheel still missing.

Backhouse gave up banking in 1833 in order that he could concentrate on his Quaker ministry. He went to America with his wife Hannah Chapman Backhouse. She toured and preached, but Backhouse had to return twice to the UK. Hannah travelled with Eliza MacBride (later Gurney) preaching in the southern states. She was shocked to see slave dealers travelling with their wares along the road. Hannah returned in 1835 and she would continue to preach in the UK for another ten years.

In 1840, Backhouse is one of the leading people at the World Anti-Slavery Convention organised by Joseph Sturge and the British and Foreign Anti-Slavery Society in 1840. Backhouse is one of the larger figures on the left of the painting. He is shown supporting the chair of the star guest and speaker, Thomas Clarkson.

== Family ==
Backhouse and his wife Hannah Chapman had two daughters and four sons. The sons included Edmund Backhouse who took over the banking firm and was also an MP. Sir Jonathan Edmund Backhouse, 1st Baronet (15 November 1849 – 27 July 1918) was his grandson.
