= Oliver Backhouse =

Admiral Oliver Backhouse, CB (5 June 1875 – 25 March 1943) was a Royal Navy officer.

Backhouse was the son of the banker Sir Jonathan Backhouse, 1st Baronet, and the younger brother of Sir Edmund Backhouse, 2nd Baronet. Admiral of the Fleet Sir Roger Backhouse, First Sea Lord from 1938 to 1939, was his younger brother.
