= John Ritchie Findlay =

Scottish newspaper owner and philanthropist (1824–1898)

- John Ritchie Findlay
- Born: 21 October 1824; Arbroath, Angus, Scotland
- Died: 16 October 1898 (aged 73); Edinburgh, Midlothian, Scotland
- Education: Bathgate Academy, University of Edinburgh
- Occupations: Journalist, Newspaper Proprietor

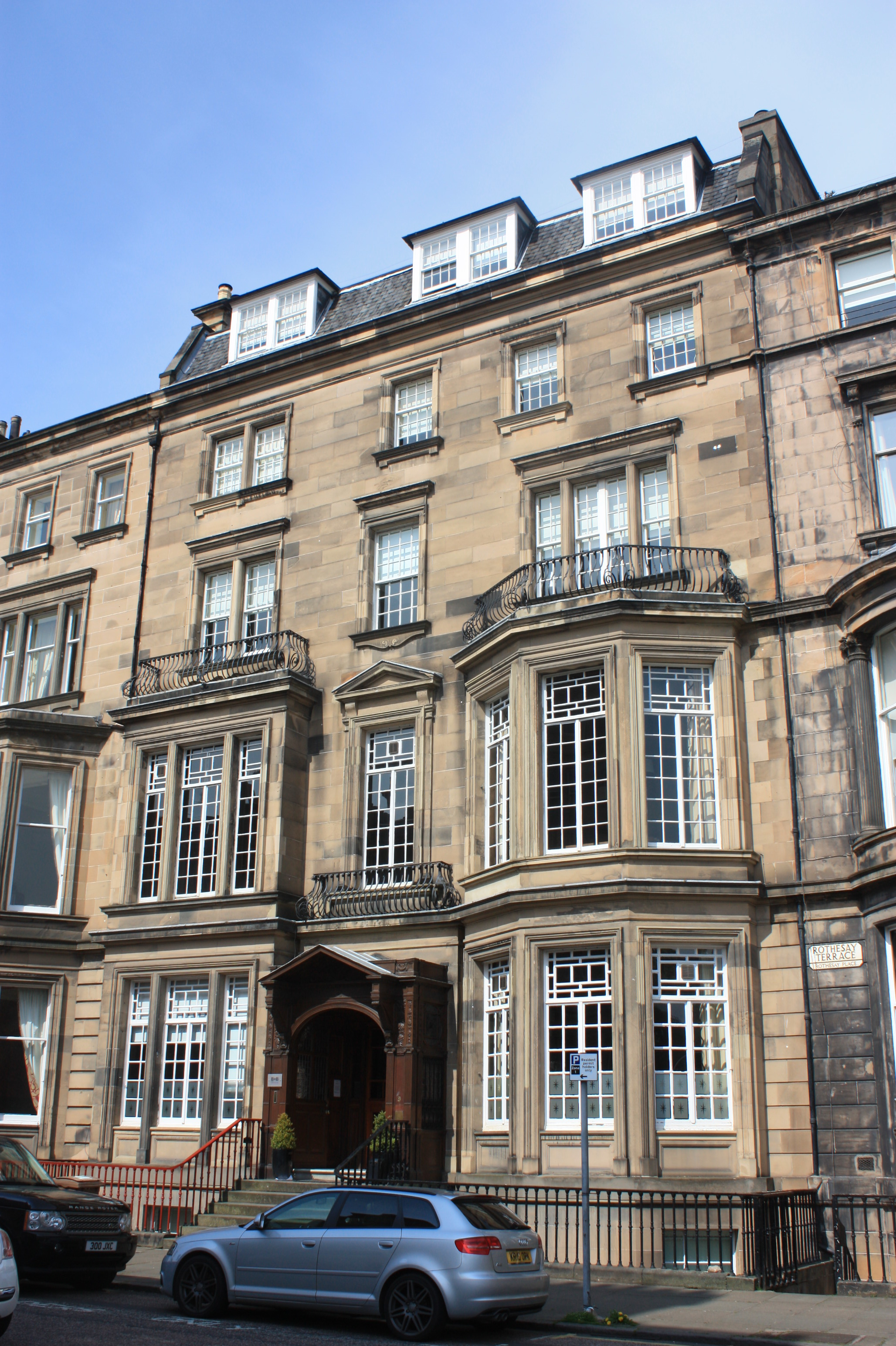
Findlay's huge house at 3 Rothesay Terrace, Edinburgh, designed by Sydney Mitchell

John Ritchie Findlay (21 October 1824 – 16 October 1898) was a Scottish newspaper owner and philanthropist.

== Life ==
John Ritchie Findlay was born at Arbroath, Angus, son of Peter Findlay and was educated at Edinburgh University. In 1842, following the failure of his father's drapery business, he moved to Edinburgh and joined the publishing office of the newspaper The Scotsman, co-founded and later solely owned by his great-uncle John Ritchie, with whom he initially lived. After a period as a clerk, he moved to the editorial office.

Findlay became a partner in the paper in 1868, and in 1870 inherited the greater part of the property from his great-uncle.

The large increase in the influence and circulation of the paper was in a great measure due to his activity and direction, and it brought him a fortune, which he spent during his lifetime in public benefaction. He presented to the United Kingdom of Great Britain and Ireland the Scottish National Portrait Gallery, opened in Edinburgh in 1889, and costing over 70,000 pounds sterling. In thanks for this, and in acknowledgement for his efforts in achieving the admission of women to the University of Edinburgh Medical School, the Queen Mary Standing Committee commissioned a statue of Mary Queen of Scots for the Eastern facade of the building. He contributed largely to the collections of the National Gallery of Scotland.

Findlay held numerous offices in antiquarian, educational and charitable societies, including:

The Society of Antiquaries (Secretary)
Association for the Medical Education of Women (President)
Edinburgh Association for Improving the Condition of the Poor (Founder)
United Industrial School
Board of Manufactures (Trustee)
Royal Hospital for Sick Children, Edinburgh (Director)

In 1885 Findlay commissioned a substantial new house designed by the architect Sydney Mitchell in Edinburgh's West End, at 3 Rothesay Terrace. The house manages to blend well with its surroundings despite being much larger than its neighbours and in a more flamboyant style.

Findlay also undertook a number of practical philanthropic projects under his own direct supervision, the most significant of which were concerned with the provision of 'ideal' workers' housing. In 1889 he built the "Well Court" development in Edinburgh's Dean Village (again designed by Mitchell), followed by the further developments of Hawthorn Buildings and Dean Path Buildings in the same area in 1895 (designed by James Bow Dunn and Findlay's son James Leslie Findlay).

Findlay avoided political office and refused the offer of a baronetcy in 1896. The freedom of Edinburgh was given him in 1896. He died at Aberlour, Banffshire, in 1898.

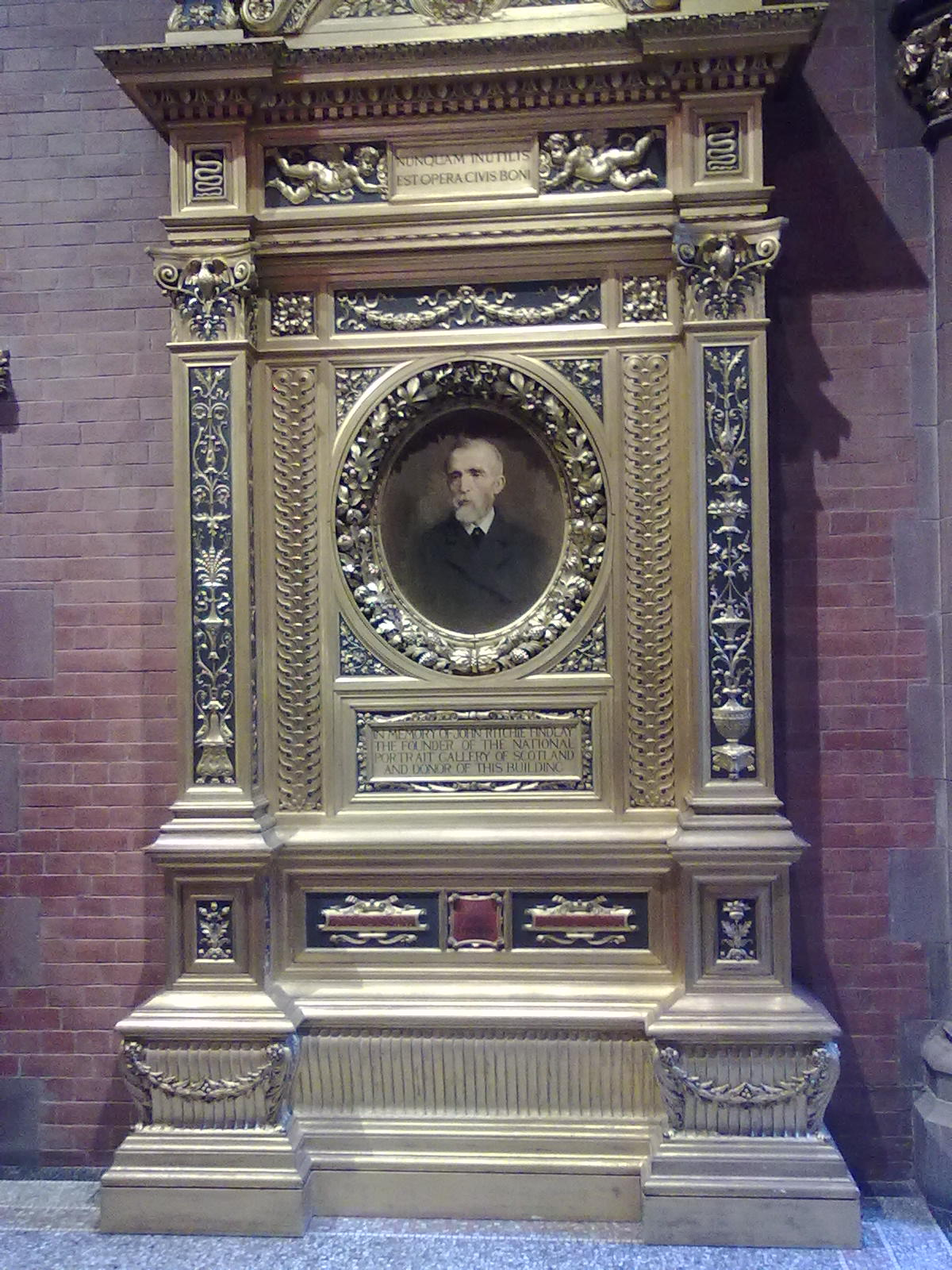
John Ritchie Findlay memorial at the Scottish National Portrait Gallery

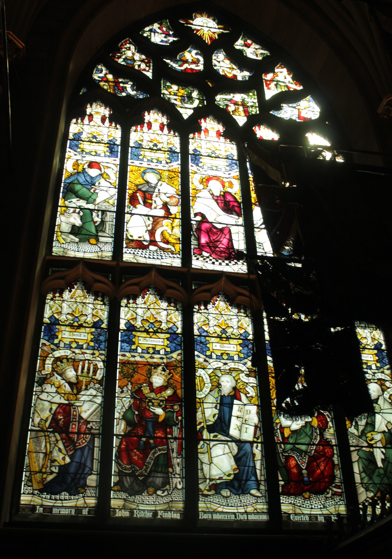
Memorial window to John Ritchie Findlay, St Giles Cathedral

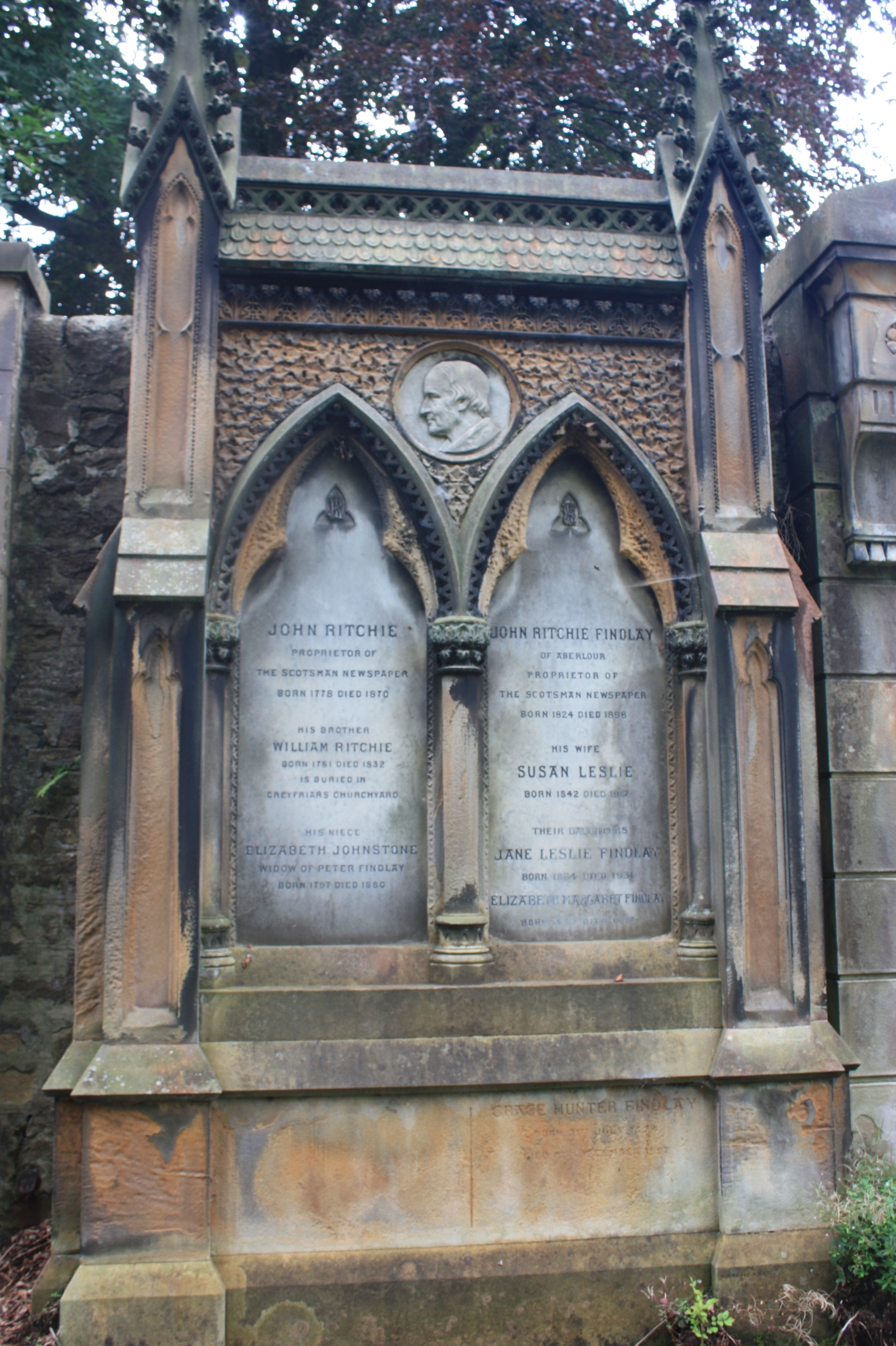
John Ritchie monument, Dean Cemetery

Findlay was buried with his great-uncle in so-called "Lords Row" in Dean Cemetery. Other memorials erected to his memory include that in the Scottish National Portrait Gallery (memorial by Rowand Anderson incorporating a portrait by Sir George Reid and a stained glass portrait medallion in the east staircase also designed by Rowand Anderson and executed by W Graham Boss), a series of memorial windows in St Giles High Kirk in Edinburgh, and a memorial window in Aberlour Parish Church.

Shortly after Findlay's death, Lord Rosebery said of him "Edinburgh can scarcely have had a citizen of more truly public spirit" (Note: Presidential Address delivered to the Edinburgh Philosophical Institution, 25 November 1898)

== Memorials ==
- Stained glass window in St Giles Cathedral
- Monument in main lobby of Scottish National Portrait Gallery

== Family ==
In 1863, Findlay married Susan Leslie, and left ten children.

Findlay's elder son Sir John Ritchie Findlay, and grandson Sir Edmund Findlay followed him as proprietors of The Scotsman. His younger son, James Leslie Findlay became an architect in the successful architectural practice of Dunn & Findlay, among whose projects were distinctive new offices and printing works for The Scotsman on Edinburgh's North Bridge, built between 1899 and 1902. Findlay's daughter, Dora Louise Findlay, married Admiral of the Fleet Sir Roger Backhouse in 1907.

== Publications (partial) ==
- Personal Recollections of Thomas De Quincey Edinburgh, Adam and Charles Black, 1886
- A History of Hatton House Edinburgh, 1875
- Notes on Hatton House, Mid-Lothian, Proc Soc Antiq Scot, vol.11, 1876
- De Quincey, Thomas, Encyclopædia Britannica, (11th edition), 1911.

== Sources ==
- Smailes, Helen (1985) A Portrait Gallery For Scotland Trustees of the National Galleries of Scotland, Edinburgh
- The Centenary of The Scotsman 1817-1917 J Ritchie & Co, Edinburgh, 1917
