= Roger Backhouse =

Royal Navy Admiral of the Fleet (1878–1939)

Admiral of the Fleet Sir Roger Backhouse GCB GCVO CMG
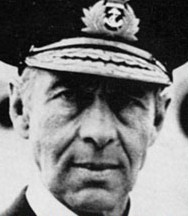
- Admiral of the Fleet Sir Roger Backhouse
- Born: 24 November 1878; Middleton Tyas, Yorkshire, England
- Died: 15 July 1939 (aged 60); London, England
- Military career
- Allegiance: United Kingdom
- Branch: Royal Navy
- Service years: 1892–1939
- Rank: Admiral of the Fleet
- Commands: First Sea Lord; Home Fleet; 1st Battle Squadron; 3rd Battle Squadron; HMS Malaya; HMS Lion; HMS Conquest
- Conflicts: First World War
- Awards: Knight Grand Cross of the Order of the Bath; Knight Grand Cross of the Royal Victorian Order; Companion of the Order of St Michael and St George

Admiral of the Fleet Sir Roger Roland Charles Backhouse, GCB, GCVO, CMG (24 November 1878 – 15 July 1939) was a Royal Navy officer. He served in the First World War as a cruiser commander and after the war became a battle squadron commander and later Commander-in-Chief, Home Fleet. Becoming First Sea Lord in November 1938, his major contribution in that role was to abandon the official British policy of sending a major fleet to Singapore to deter Japanese aggression (the Singapore strategy), realising the immediate threat was closer to home (from Germany and Italy) and that such a policy was no longer viable. He died from a brain tumour in July 1939 just before the outbreak of the Second World War.

== Naval career ==
Backhouse was fourth son of Sir Jonathan Backhouse, 1st Baronet and Florence Backhouse (née Salusbury-Trelawny); his elder brother, Admiral Oliver Backhouse, also achieved flag rank in the Royal Navy. Backhouse joined the Royal Navy as a cadet in the training ship HMS Britannia in 1892 and went to sea as a midshipman in the battleship HMS Repulse in the Channel Squadron in 1894.

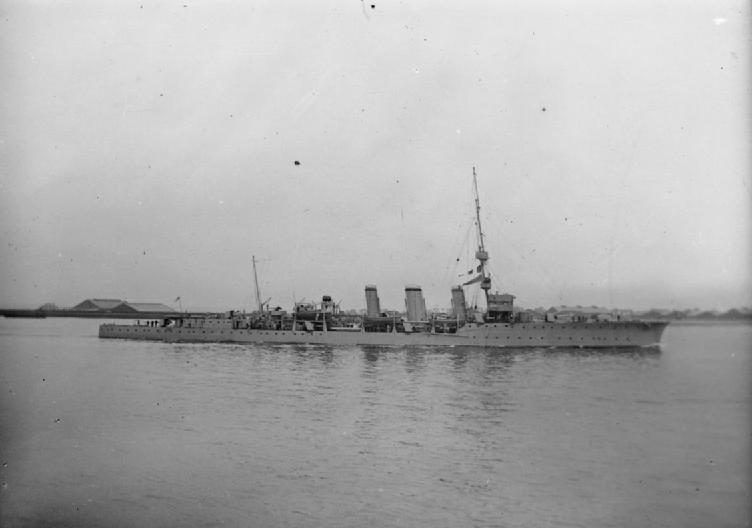
The light cruiser HMS Conquest, which Backhouse commanded during the First World War

Backhouse transferred to the corvette HMS Comus on the Pacific Station in October 1895 and, having been promoted to sub-lieutenant on 15 March 1898 and to lieutenant on 15 March 1899, he joined the battleship HMS Victorious in the Mediterranean Fleet in November 1899. After attending the gunnery school HMS Excellent, he was posted as gunnery officer to the battleship HMS Russell in the Mediterranean Fleet in February 1903 and then to the battleship HMS Queen in Mediterranean Fleet in April 1904, before returning to HMS Excellent to join the directing staff in July 1905. He became gunnery officer in the battleship HMS Dreadnought in the Channel Fleet in August 1907 and, having been promoted to commander on 31 December 1909, he rejoined the directing staff at HMS Excellent in February 1910. He became Flag Commander to the Commander-in-Chief, Home Fleet, first in HMS Neptune from March 1911 and then in HMS Iron Duke from March 1914.

Backhouse served in the First World War, earning promotion to captain on 1 September 1914, and being appointed commanding officer of the light cruiser HMS Conquest in the Harwich Force in November 1915 before being given command of the battle cruiser HMS Lion, flagship of the Battle Cruiser force, in November 1916. He was appointed a Companion of the Order of St Michael and St George on 4 June 1917.

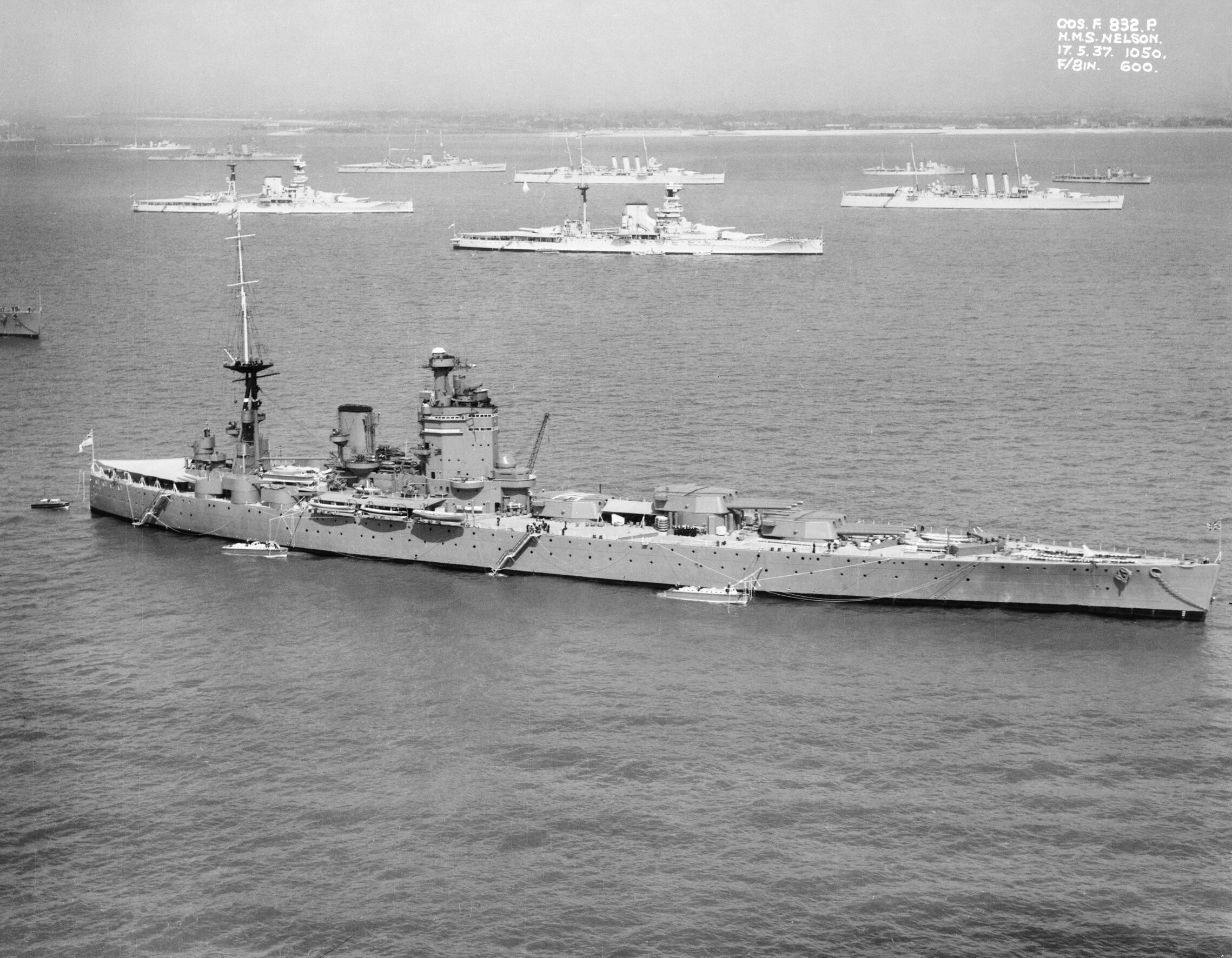
The battleship HMS Nelson, Backhouse's flagship as Commander-in-Chief, Home Fleet

Backhouse became Director of Naval Ordnance at the Admiralty in September 1920 and then commanding officer of the battleship HMS Malaya in January 1923, before receiving promotion to rear admiral on 24 February 1925 and being given command of the 3rd Battle Squadron in May 1926. He became Third Sea Lord and Controller of the Navy in November 1928, and having been promoted to vice admiral on 9 October 1929, he became Commander of the 1st Battle Squadron and Second-in-Command of the Mediterranean Fleet in April 1932. Appointed a Knight Commander of the Order of the Bath in the 1933 New Year Honours, he was promoted to full admiral on 11 February 1934 and became Commander-in-Chief, Home Fleet, with his flag in the battleship HMS Nelson, on 20 August 1935. Two months later, when being flown back from London to Portsmouth, his Supermarine Walrus aircraft made a bad landing and began to sink; he and the crew had to be rescued, leaving him uninjured but shaken. He was appointed a Knight Grand Cross of the Royal Victorian Order on 20 May 1937.

Advanced to Knight Grand Cross of the Order of the Bath in the 1938 New Year Honours and appointed First and Principal Naval Aide-de-Camp to the King on 1 July, Backhouse became First Sea Lord on 7 September 1938. Taking office shortly before the signing of the Munich Agreement, his major contribution as First Sea Lord was to abandon the official British policy of sending a major fleet to Singapore to deter Japanese aggression (the Singapore strategy), realising the immediate threat was closer to home (from Germany and Italy) and that such a policy was no longer viable. With failing health, he resigned as First Sea Lord in May 1939 and, having been promoted to Admiral of the Fleet on 29 June 1939, he died from a brain tumour in London on 15 July 1939 just before the outbreak of the Second World War.

== Family ==
In 1907 Backhouse married Dora Louise Findlay, daughter of John Ritchie Findlay proprietor of the British newspaper, The Scotsman; they had two sons and four daughters.

== Sources ==
- Heathcote, Tony (2002). The British Admirals of the Fleet 1734 – 1995. Pen & Sword Ltd. ISBN 0-85052-835-6.

Military offices
Preceded by Sir Ernle Chatfield	Third Sea Lord and Controller of the Navy; 1928–1932	Succeeded by Sir Charles Forbes
Preceded by The Earl of Cork and Orrery	Commander-in-Chief, Home Fleet; 1935–1938	Succeeded by Sir Charles Forbes
Preceded by Sir Ernle Chatfield	First Sea Lord; 1938–1939	Succeeded by Sir Dudley Pound
Honorary titles
Preceded by The Earl of Cork and Orrery	First and Principal Naval Aide-de-Camp; 1938–1939	Succeeded by Hon. Sir Reginald Drax
