= Jonathan Backhouse =

English banker (1849–1918)

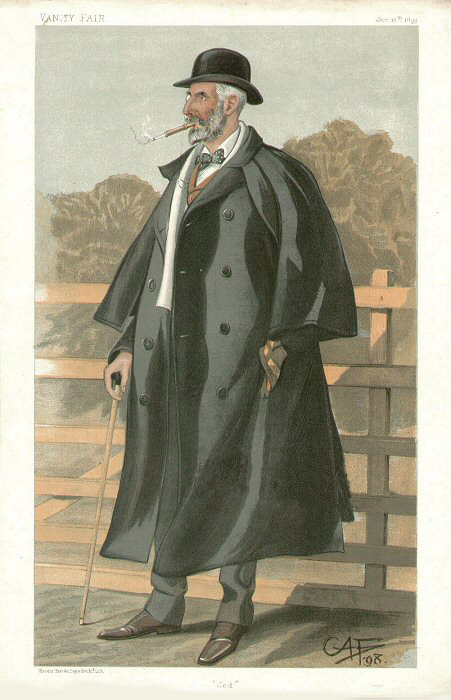
- Born: 15 November 1849
- Died: 27 July 1918 (aged 68)
- Spouse(s): Florence Salusbury-Trelawny
- Children: Sir Edmund Backhouse, 2nd Baronet, Roland Charles Backhouse, Oliver Backhouse, Roger Backhouse, Miles Roland Charles Backhouse, Harriet Findlay
- Parent(s): Edmund Backhouse; Juliet Mary Fox

Sir Jonathan Edmund Backhouse, 1st Baronet, JP (15 November 1849 – 27 July 1918) was a British banker.

Backhouse was a director of Backhouse's Bank the family bank in Darlington, County Durham, one of the leading country banks that merged in 1896 to create the modern Barclays Bank, of which he became a director. He was created a baronet in 1901

He served as a Justice of the Peace (J.P.) for Durham and the North Riding of Yorkshire. He was for many years an active Liberal Unionist. In 1881 he was resident at The Rookery, Middleton Tyas, North Yorkshire.

He was the son of Edmund Backhouse, member of parliament for Darlington, and his wife, Juliet (born Fox). He married in 1871 Florence Salusbury-Trelawny, daughter of Sir John Salusbury-Trelawny, 9th Baronet. Lady Backhouse was for some years a member of the Darlington Board of Guardians, and took a lively interest in the Liberal Unionist cause. She died at Uplands, Darlington on 11 October 1902. They had six children (five sons and a daughter), most of whom distinguished themselves, though in different ways. Of these, the most famous was the fourth son, Admiral of the Fleet Sir Roger Backhouse who was First Sea Lord from 1938 to 1939. Their second son, Admiral Oliver Backhouse, also reached flag rank in the Royal Navy. A daughter, Lady Findlay DBE, was a prominent activist.

Their eldest son, Edmund, garnered posthumous notoriety following the publication in 1976 of his biography by Hugh Trevor-Roper, Regius Professor of Modern History at Oxford, in which Edmund was exposed as a serial forger and confidence trickster.

== Jonathan Backhouse: the bank ==
Backhouse & Co was established in Darlington in 1774 by James Backhouse and his eldest son Jonathan. The family were linen and worsted manufacturers and had already been doing banking business in conjunction with their regular trade before they started an independent bank. James died in 1798 and the name of the bank was changed to Jonathan Backhouse. Jonathan's younger brother James was brought in as a partner at that time. Backhouse became the leading private bank in the region. Branches were opened in Durham in 1815 and Sunderland in 1816, both following the failure of local banks. More branches and agencies were opened in the 1820s in the Teesside region. By the time of the bank's centenary in 1874, it had ten branches in the Darlington and Teesside area including Middlesbrough, Hartlepool and Northallerton.

Jonathan had died in 1826 and was succeeded by his five sons; the bank stayed under family ownership for the remainder of its independent existence. In the early 1890s discussions took place on the potential merger of 20 country banks to form one large national organisation. As these negotiations became protracted, Jonathan Backhouse joined with Barclay & Co, of London and Gurney & Co. of Norwich to enter into a preliminary agreement to combine. The 17 other banks were then invited to join and the merger was completed in 1896.

== Sources ==
- Who was who
- The Times, 29 July 1918, p. 9; Issue 41854; col F Obituary "Sir J. E. Backhouse".

Baronetage of the United Kingdom
New creation	Baronet (of Uplands, County Durham); 1901–1918	Succeeded by Edmund Trelawny Backhouse
