= Pease =

Pease, in Middle English, was a noun referring to the vegetable pea; see that article for its etymology. The word survives into modern English in pease pudding.

Pease may also refer to:

== People ==
- Pease family (Darlington), a prominent family in Darlington, UK
- Al Pease (1921–2014), Formula One driver
- Sir Alfred Pease, 2nd Baronet (1857–1939), English Liberal Party politician
- Alfred Pease (musician) (1838–1882), American composer
- Allan Pease, Australian body language expert
- Arthur Pease (MP) (1837–1898), English MP
- Sir Arthur Pease, 1st Baronet (1866–1927), 1st Baronet and British coal magnate and railway director
- Arthur Stanley Pease (1881–1964), American professor of Classics and amateur botanist
- Bas Pease (1922–2004), British physicist
- Barbara Pease, Australian body language expert
- Bob Pease (1940–2011), American analog integrated circuit design expert
- Claire Pease (born 2009), American artistic gymnast
- Don Pease (1932–2002), U.S. Representative from Ohio
- Edward Pease (disambiguation), several people
- Elisha M. Pease (1812–1883), Texas governor
- Francis G. Pease (1881–1938), American astronomer
- Frank Pease (1879–1959), Hollywood anti-Communist
- Harl Pease (1917–1942), awarded the Medal of Honor
- Henry Pease (disambiguation)
- Herbert Pease, 1st Baron Daryngton (1867–1949), English MP
- Howard Pease (1894–1974), American writer of children's literature
- Jack Pease, 1st Baron Gainford (1860–1943), son of Sir Joseph Pease, 1st Baronet
- Joachim Pease (1842-unknown), Medal of Honor recipient
- John Pease (disambiguation), several people
- Joseph Pease (railway pioneer) (1799–1872), first Quaker elected Member of Parliament, railway owner
- Sir Joseph Pease, 1st Baronet, MP (1828–1903), son of Joseph Pease (1799–1872)
- Joseph Pease, 2nd Baron Gainford (1889–1971)
- Joseph Pease, 3rd Baron Gainford (1921–2013)
- Ken Pease (born 1943), British criminologist
- Lute Pease (1869–1963), American cartoonist
- Patsy Pease (born 1956), American actress
- Spencer A. Pease (1817–1889), American lawyer, physician, newspaper editor, and politician
- William Harper Pease (1824–1871), American malacologist

== Places ==
=== United Kingdom ===
- Pease Pottage, West Sussex, UK
- Pease Dean, Scottish Borders, Scotland
  - Pease Bay, a nature reserve at Pease Bay

=== United States ===
- Pease, Minnesota
- Pease, Missouri
- Pease Air Force Base, New Hampshire (now closed), named after Harl Pease
  - Pease Air National Guard Base, located on a portion of the former Air Force base
- Portsmouth International Airport at Pease, often referred to as "Pease International Airport", at the former Air Force base, also named after Harl Pease
- Pease Township, Belmont County, Ohio

== See also ==
- Pea (disambiguation)
- Peace (disambiguation)
- Piece (disambiguation)
