= Joseph Pease =

Joseph Pease may refer to:

- Joseph Pease (railway pioneer) (1799–1872), railway owner, first Quaker elected Member of Parliament
  - Sir Joseph Pease, 1st Baronet (1828–1903), MP 1865–1903, full name Joseph Whitwell Pease, son of Joseph Pease (1799–1872)
    - Jack Pease, 1st Baron Gainford (Joseph Albert Pease, 1860–1943), son of Joseph Whitwell Pease
      - Joseph Pease, 2nd Baron Gainford (1889–1971), only son of the above
        - Joseph Pease, 3rd Baron Gainford (1921–2013), son of the above
- Joseph Pease (India reformer) (1772–1846), English Quaker activist, uncle of Joseph Pease (1799–1872)
- Joseph Walker Pease (1820–1882), MP for Kingston upon Hull

== See also ==
- Pease family (Darlington)
- Pease (disambiguation)
