= Baron Gainford =

Title in the Peerage of the United Kingdom

Baron Gainford, of Headlam in the County Palatine of Durham, is a title in the Peerage of the United Kingdom. It was created on 3 January 1917 for the Liberal politician Jack Pease, a member of the Darlington Pease family. He notably served as President of the Board of Education from 1911 to 1915. Pease was the second son of Sir Joseph Pease, 1st Baronet, and the grandson of Joseph Pease, while Arthur Pease was his uncle and Sir Arthur Pease, 1st Baronet, Beaumont Pease, 1st Baron Wardington, and Herbert Pease, 1st Baron Daryngton, were his first cousins. The third baron was a former member of the London County Council and of the Greater London Council. As of 2013 the title is held by his younger brother, the fourth baron, an architect and town planner; County Planning Officer for Ross and Cromarty 1967–1975 and Scottish Office Inquiry Reporter 1978–1993.

== Baron Gainford (1917) ==
- Joseph Albert "Jack" Pease, 1st Baron Gainford (1860–1943)
- Joseph Pease, 2nd Baron Gainford (1889–1971)
- Joseph Edward Pease, 3rd Baron Gainford (1921–2013)
- George Pease, 4th Baron Gainford (1926–2022)
- Adrian Christopher Pease, 5th Baron Gainford (b. 1960)

The heir presumptive to the barony is the present holder's brother, Hon. Matthew Edward Pease (b. 1962).

The heir presumptive's heir apparent is his eldest son, Felix George Pease (b. 1992), followed by his brother, Silas John Pease (b. 1999).

Coat of arms of Baron Gainford
Crest Upon the capital of an Ionic column a dove rising holding in the beak a pea stalk as in the arms all Proper. Escutcheon Per fess Azure and Gules a fess nebuly Ermine between two lambs passant in chief Argent and in base upon a mount Proper a dove rising Argent holding in the beak a pea stalk the blossoms and pods also Proper. Supporters On either side a barbary wild sheep ram guardant Or. Motto Pax Et Spes

== See also ==
- Pease Baronets, of Hutton Lowcross and Pinchinthorpe
- Pease Baronets, of Hammersknott
- Baron Daryngton
- Pease family of Darlington
