= Baron Daryngton =

Title in the Peerage of the United Kingdom

Baron Daryngton, of Witley in the County of Surrey, was a title in the Peerage of the United Kingdom. It was created on 12 February 1923 for Herbert Pike Pease, who had previously represented Darlington in Parliament as a Liberal Unionist. He was the younger son of Arthur Pease and the younger brother of Sir Arthur Pease, 1st Baronet, while Sir Joseph Pease, 1st Baronet, was his uncle and Jack Pease, 1st Baron Gainford, his first cousin. The peerage became extinct on the death of his son, the 2nd Baron, in 1994.

== Barons Daryngton (1923) ==
- Herbert Pike Pease, 1st Baron Daryngton (1867–1949)
- Jocelyn Arthur Pease, 2nd Baron Daryngton (1908–1994)

Coat of arms of Baron Daryngton
Crest Upon the capital of an ionic column a dove rising holding in the beak a pea stalk all Proper. Escutcheon Azure a fess between in chief two lambs passant Argent and in base a wreath of laurel Or. Supporters On either side a dove wings addorsed holding in the beak a pea stalk all Proper. Motto Pax Et Spes

== See also ==
- Pease Baronets
- Baron Gainford
- Pease family of Darlington
