= Pease baronets of Hummersknott (1920) =

The Pease baronetcy, of Hummersknott in the County of Durham, was created in the Baronetage of the United Kingdom on 25 June 1920 for the coal magnate Arthur Pease, Civil Lord of the Admiralty from 1918 to 1919. He was the son of Arthur Pease, younger brother of the 1st Baronet of the 1882 creation.

The title is currently marked "vacant" on the Official Roll.

== Pease baronets, of Hummersknott (1920) ==
- Sir Arthur Francis Pease, 1st Baronet (1866–1927)
- Sir Richard Arthur Pease, 2nd Baronet (1890–1969)
- Sir Richard Thorn Pease, 3rd Baronet (1922–2021)
- Sir Richard Peter Pease, supposed 4th Baronet (born 1958). His name does not appear on the Official Roll of the Baronetage.

The heir presumptive to the title is the current supposed holder's cousin, Jonathan Edward Pease (born 1952).

== Extended family ==
- Herbert Pease, 1st Baron Daryngton was the younger brother of the 1st Baronet.
