= Edward Pease =

Edward Pease may refer to:

- Ed Pease (Edward Allan Pease, born 1951), former US congressman from Indiana
- Edward Pease (railway pioneer) (1767–1858), railway pioneer
- Edward R. Pease (1857–1955), first cousin twice removed of Edward Pease (1767–1858), founder of the Fabian Society

== See also ==
- Pease family
