= Kari Blackburn =

British broadcast executive (1954–2007)

- Born: Kari Blackburn; 30 March 1954; Somerset, England
- Died: 27 June 2007 (aged 53); Felixstowe, Suffolk, England
- Other name: Kari Boto
- Employer: BBC
- Spouse: Tom Boto
- Relatives: Robert Blackburn (father), Ian Bradley (brother-in-law), Norman Archer (grandfather), Walter Archer (great grandfather), Herbert Pease, 1st Baron Daryngton (great grandfather)

Kari Boto (née Blackburn; 30 March 1954 – 27 June 2007) was a BBC reporter and senior executive who specialised in Africa.

== Biography ==
=== Personal life ===
Blackburn was born in Somerset on 30 March 1954 to Irish educationist Robert Blackburn and Esther Archer. She took her A-levels at United World College of the Atlantic and later studied in the Faculty of Social and Political Sciences at Churchill College, Cambridge and graduated with First Class Honours. Afterwards, she travelled to Africa to teach in a primary school in Tanzania, returning to Europe in 1977.

Blackburn met Tom Boto, her future husband, in London. Boto had fled Uganda to escape the regime of Idi Amin, who came to power through a coup d'état in 1971. Blackburn and Boto were married in 1981, and had two children: a daughter and a son. They also adopted a nephew of Boto's as their third child.

=== BBC career ===
Blackburn joined the BBC in 1977 as a news trainee, and continued to work for the broadcasting corporation until her death. In 1992, she became editor of the BBC Marshall Plan of the Mind Trust, a "multimedia education project" for the former Soviet republics. From 1996 to 1999, she headed the BBC Swahili and Great Lakes Service. She became head of BBC World Service Africa in 1999, and remained in this post until 2003, when she became regional executive director of BBC World Service for Africa and the Middle East, broadcast in English, Arabic and seven other languages. In October 2006, she became director of international operations at the BBC World Service Trust, an "independently-funded development charity of the BBC".

=== Death ===
Blackburn died on 27 June 2007; she drowned in the North Sea seaport of Felixstowe, Suffolk, England, close to her home in Ipswich. Her death came three days before the expiration of her BBC contract and the week of the 25th anniversary celebration for the BBC Swahili Service that she had not been invited to attend, despite her many years of past involvement.

Blackburn was reported missing after her clothes and keys were found on the beach. Notes addressed to her husband and children were also found in Blackburn's car. Her body was recovered and transported by a RAF helicopter to Ipswich Hospital, but she could not be resuscitated.

John Ssebaana Kizito, president of Uganda's Democratic Party and former mayor of Kampala, paid tribute to Blackburn in early July, writing: "The death of Kari Blackburn comes as a great shock to me. It is as unexpected as it is devastating."

An inquest, held on 16 May 2008, ruled her death to have been a suicide. According to Boto, a Ugandan consultant gynaecologist at Ipswich Hospital, Blackburn suffered from "mental and physical illness" after assuming her position at BBC World Service Trust and felt "isolated and under-supported". Boto blamed the BBC for his wife's death.

The BBC released a statement in response to the coroner's judgment, describing Blackburn as "a very popular leader, with great humanity and compassion" who "was devoted to the BBC". On news of her suicide, hundreds of people working for the BBC World Service and BBC Newsgathering signed a petition demanding an independent inquiry into the circumstances leading up to her death and the role that the work environment may have played in her depression; the inquiry was undertaken by the Deputy Director General's head of HR.

== See also ==
- List of drowning victims
