= Field pea =

Field pea may refer to:

- Pea § Field pea, any of certain varieties of common pea (Lathyrus oleraceus) used worldwide for human or animal consumption; sometimes called dry field pea
- Cowpea (Vigna unguiculata), used for culinary purposes and forage in Africa and the Americas

== See also ==
- Pea (disambiguation)
