= John Pease =

John Pease may refer to:

- John Pease (sociologist) (born 1936), associate professor of sociology at the University of Maryland, College Park
- John Pease (American football) (1943–2021), retired football coach
- Beaumont Pease, 1st Baron Wardington (John William Beaumont Pease, 1869–1950), British banker

== See also ==
- Jack Pease, 1st Baron Gainford (1860–1943), British businessman and Liberal politician
