= George Pease =

George Pease may refer to:

- George Pease (American football), American football player
- George Anson Pease, steamboat captain
- George Pease (architect), British architect
