= Headlam Hall =

Country house hotel in Headlam, County Durham, England

Coordinates: 54.566°N 1.723°W

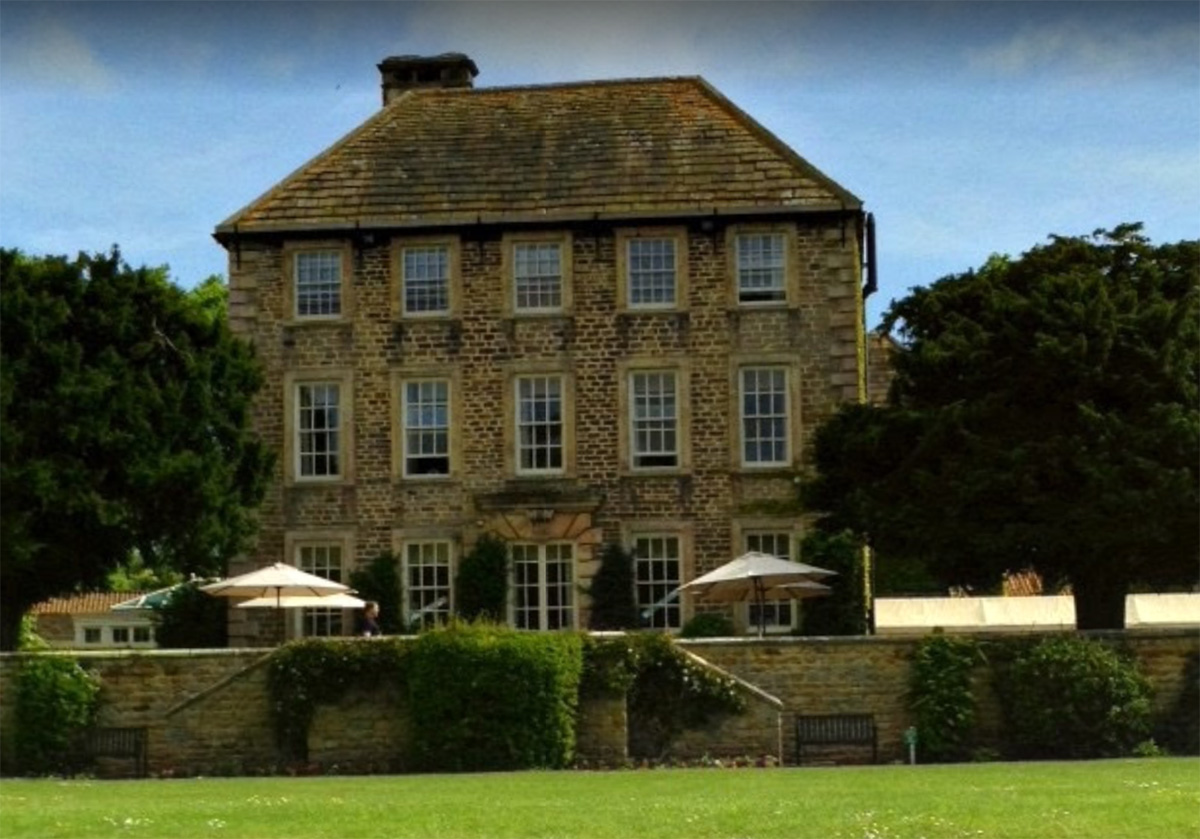
Headlam Hall

Headlam Hall is a 17th-century country house at The Green, Headlam, near Gainford, County Durham, England. It is a Grade II* listed building now in use as a hotel and country club.

== Early residents ==
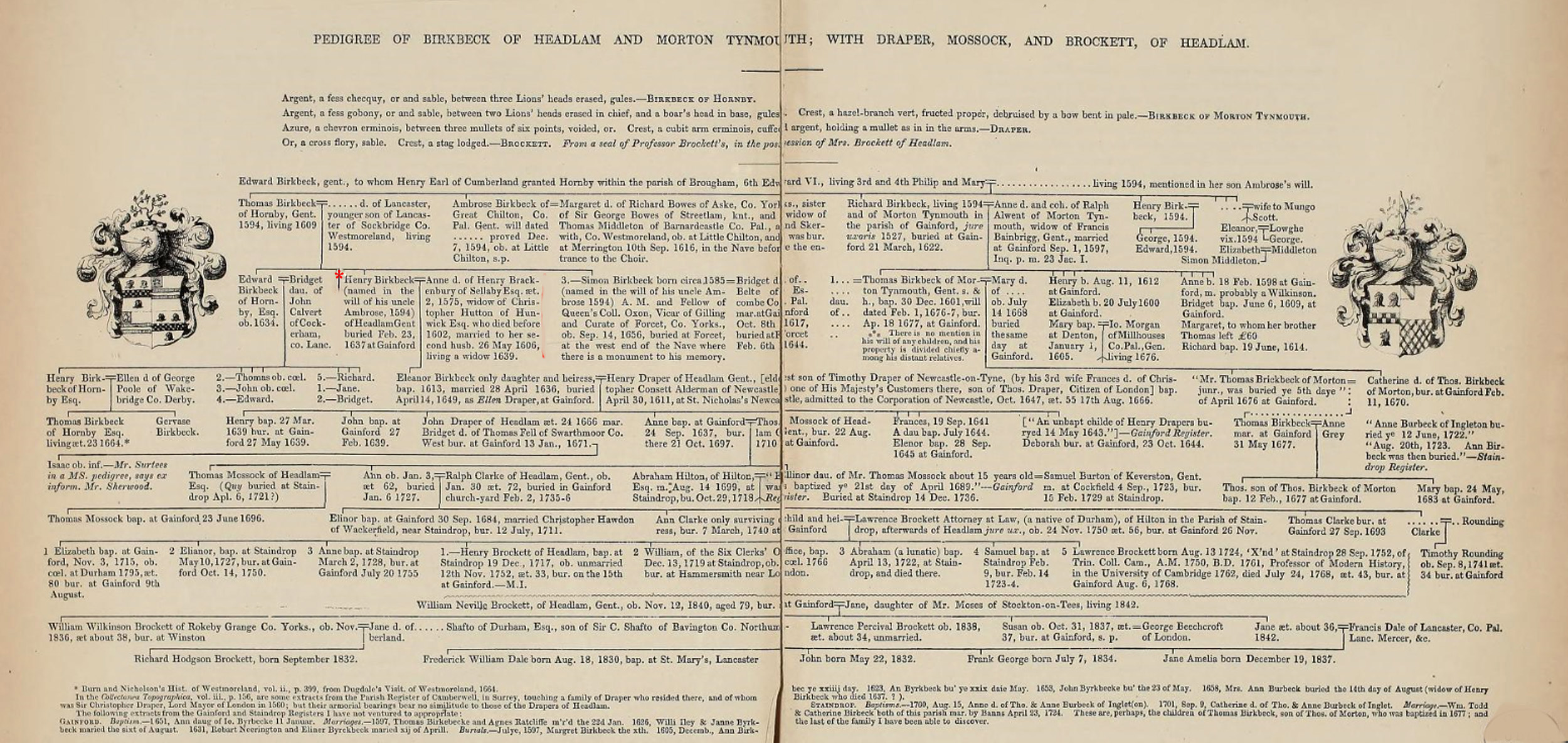
Birkbeck family tree

Henry Birkbeck (1564-1637) built Headlam Hall around the time of his marriage in 1606 to Anne Brackenbury. He was the son of Thomas Birkbeck a wealthy landowner. As a present for his wife he had an elaborate oak fireplace installed in the main hall with the Birkbeck coat of arms displayed in the centre of the mantle. This feature still stands today. It was described in several early history books. John Richard Walbran in 1846 says it was a richly ornamented fireplace in the centre compartment of which “is a mantled shield, hearing a fess gobony, between three lions heads erased, a crescent for difference; impaling three chevronels interlaced — the arms of Henry Birkbeck, Esq.”

When Henry died in 1637 his only child Eleanor inherited the Hall. She married Henry Draper (1611-1666) and together they lived at the house. Henry was a personal friend of George Fox the founder of the Quaker religion and it is recorded that he was a guest at Headlam Hall on several occasions.

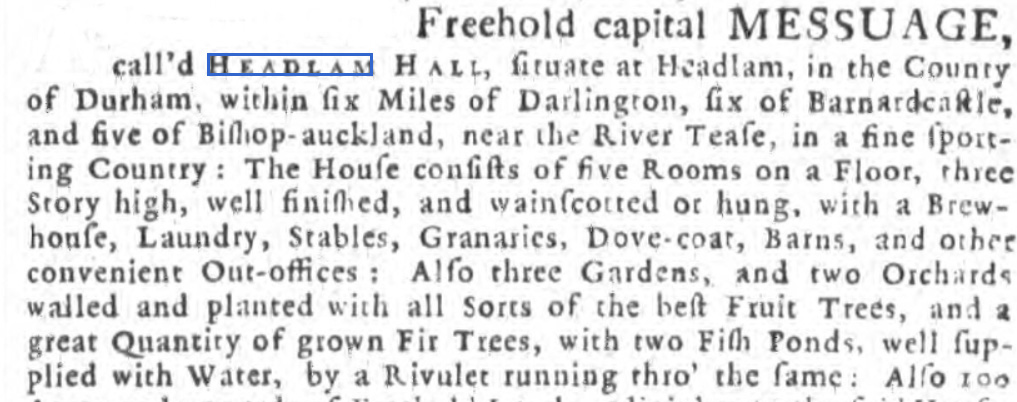
Sale notice for Headlam Hall 1751

When Henry Draper died in 1666 his son John Draper became the owner. However he died five years later and as he had no living heirs his sister Anne and her husband Thomas Mossock (died 1710). When he died their son Thomas Mossock who died in 1721 became the owner. As he had no heirs his sister Ann and her husband Ralph Clark inherited the Hall. There is a memorial plaque in Gainford Church in their honour. When he died in 1736 their only surviving child Ann Clark who had married Lawrence Brockett inherited the house.

Lawrence Brockett (1694-1750) was an attorney and is credited with making substantial alterations and additions to the house. When he died in 1750 his eldest son Henry inherited the property. He advertised it for sale but it was not sold. He died two years later in 1752 so it was then left to his younger brother the noted historian Lawrence Brockett (1724-1768).

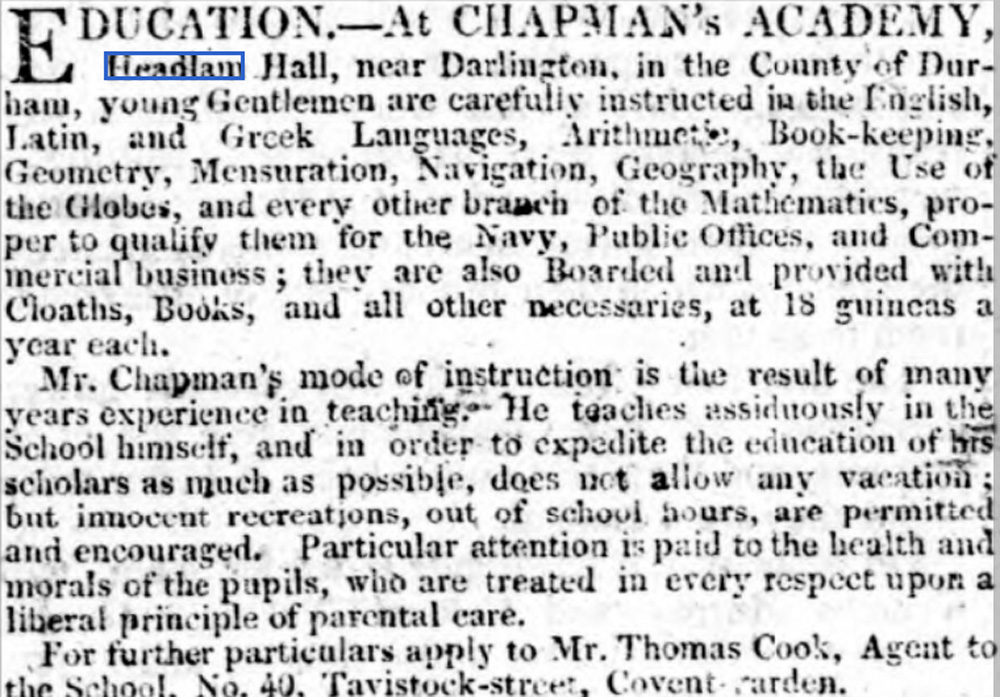
Advertisement for Chapman's Academy at Headlam Hall in 1809

Lawrence Brockett (1724-1768) went to Trinity College at the University of Cambridge in 1743 and was appointed the Professor of Modern History in 1762. He did not marry but had an illegitimate son William Neville Brockett (1761-1840). In his Will he recognised this child who was then only seven and left Headlam Hall to him.

From about 1800 William rented the house to various tenants. From 1804 until 1831 it was a boys' school called Chapmans Academy. The headmaster was John Chapman of Alwent Hall. He died in 1840 and in 1845 the Brockett family sold the house to John Hett. It remained in the Hett family for the next sixty years.

== Later residents ==
John Hett (1777-1853) was born in 1777 in Billingham, Durham. In 1833 he married Mary Ann Huson (1801-1857). The couple had two sons and a daughter. He died in 1853 and his wife Mary Ann continued to live at Headlam Hall with their eldest son John Hett (1839-1899). There is a gravestone in St Marys Churchyard, Gainford as a memorial to both of them.

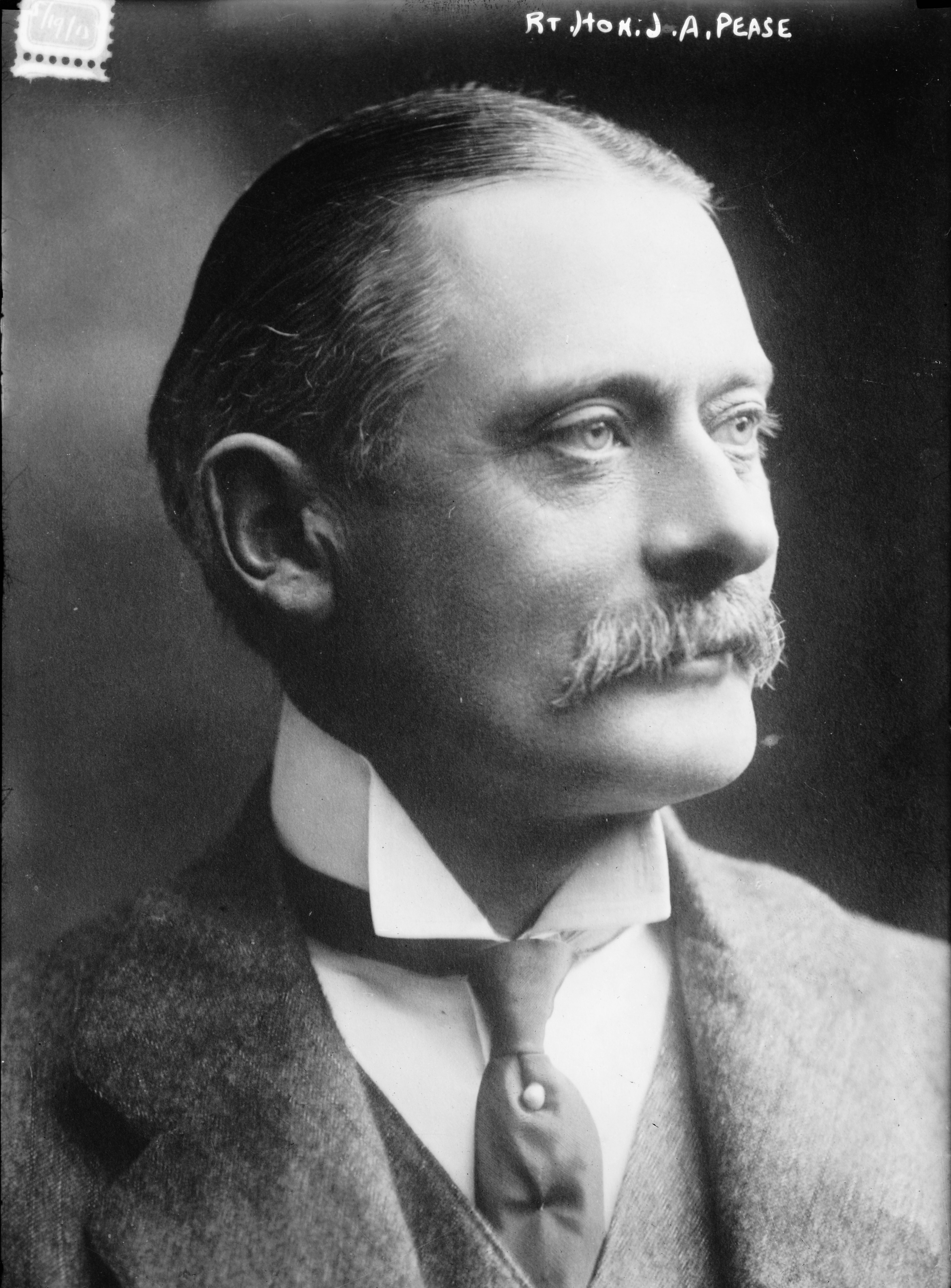
Sir Joseph (Jack) Albert Pease

After Mary Ann’s death their son John Hett (1839-1899) lived at Headlam hall for some time. In 1860 he married Emma Elizabeth Cundell (1830-1902) and the couple had two sons and four daughters. He was a wealthy landowner. John died in 1899 and Emma in 1902. There is a gravestone next to John’s parents in Gainford churchyard in their honour. After John’s death their son Richard Percy Hett moved into the Hall. Several years later he sold it to Joseph Albert Pease. A newspaper reported in 1904 that he was in residence at Headlam Hall at this date.

Joseph Albert (Jack) Pease, 1st Baron Gainford was born in 1860. His father was Sir Joseph Whitwell Pease, prominent industrialist and banker. Jack Pease, as he was known, enjoyed an early life of wealth and privilege in one of Britain's most prominent family dynasties. He was educated at the University of Cambridge where he shone as secretary of the amateur dramatic club, was master of the university drag hounds, and represented the university at polo and rugby. He also captained the Trinity College cricket eleven. He became a politician and was a personal friend of Asquith.

In 1886 he married Ethel (Elsie) Havelock-Allen, the daughter of Sir Henry Marshman Havelock-Allen. The couple had a son and two daughters. His wife was a notable socialite and held numerous functions at the Hall. Jack died in 1943 and the house was sold to Sir John Blunt. Sir John Lionel Reginald Blunt 10th Baronet (1908-1969) lived at Headlam Hall for the next four years until his second marriage in 1947. It was then sold to Lieutenant Colonel Hugh Morton Stobart, C.B.E., D.S.O.

Lieutenant Colonel Hugh Morton Stobart was a wealthy industrialist who died in 1952. He left the house to his wife Rosalie Mary Stobart (who in 1960 married Major Seed) and his children. In 1977 it was sold to John and Ann Robinson who already lived and farmed in Headlam. Over the ensuing years they created a hotel at Headlam Hall which now includes a spa and golf course. It continues to be owned and run by the Robinson family.
