= Pease baronets of Hutton Lowcross and Pinchinthorpe (1882) =

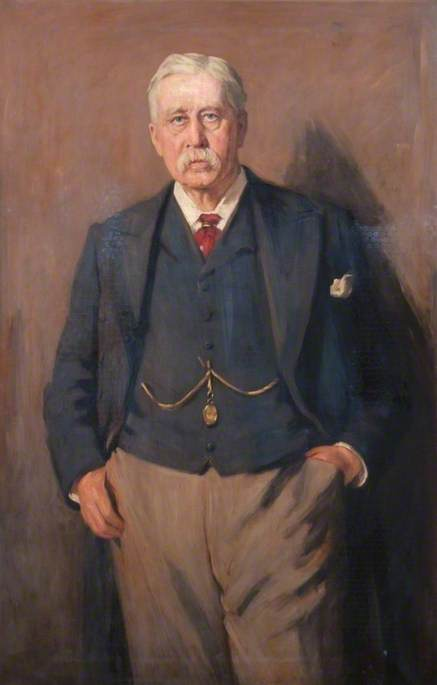
Sir Joseph Pease, 1st Baronet, portrait

The Pease baronetcy, of Hutton Lowcross and Pinchinthorpe in the County of York, was created in the Baronetage of the United Kingdom on 18 May 1882 for the railway chairman Joseph Pease. He represented South Durham from 1865 to 1885 and Barnard Castle from 1885 to 1903 in the House of Commons. Pease was the son of Joseph Pease and the grandson of Edward Pease.

He was succeeded by his eldest son the 2nd Baronet. He sat as Member of Parliament for York from 1885 to 1892 and Cleveland from 1897 to 1902.

== Pease baronets, of Hutton Lowcross and Pinchinthorpe (1882) ==
- Sir Joseph Whitwell Pease, 1st Baronet (1828–1903)
- Sir Alfred Edward Pease, 2nd Baronet (1857–1939)
- Sir Edward Pease, 3rd Baronet (1880–1963)
- Sir Alfred Vincent Pease, 4th Baronet (1926–2008)
- Sir Joseph Gurney Pease, 5th Baronet (1927–2023)
- Sir Charles Edward Gurney Pease, 6th Baronet (born 1955)

The heir presumptive is the present holder's distant cousin Adrian Christopher Pease, 5th Baron Gainford (born 1950).

== Extended family ==
- Jack Pease, 1st Baron Gainford was the second son of the 1st Baronet.
- Beaumont Pease, 1st Baron Wardington, Chairman of Lloyds Bank, was a first cousin once removed of the 1st Baronet.

== Notes ==
Baronetage of the United Kingdom
Preceded by Bass baronets	Pease baronets of Hutton Lowcross and Pinchinthorpe; 18 May 1882	Succeeded by Lawes baronets
