= Peashooter =

Peashooter or pea shooter may refer to:

- Peashooter (toy), a tube that launches peas or other small projectiles via blowing
- Boeing P-26 "Peashooter", an American fighter aircraft
- Tucker XP-57, nicknamed the "Peashooter", an American fighter aircraft
- Peashooter, a fictional pea-based plant from the Plants vs. Zombies franchise

== See also ==
- Pea (disambiguation)
- Shooter (disambiguation)
