= Hugh Archer =

Hugh Archer may refer to:

- Hugh Archer (politician) (1796–1858), politician in Florida
- Hugh Archer (Royal Navy officer) (1879–1931), British Royal Navy officer and spy
