= Norman Ernest Archer =

British diplomat

Lt.-Cdr. Norman Archer C.M.G., O.B.E.
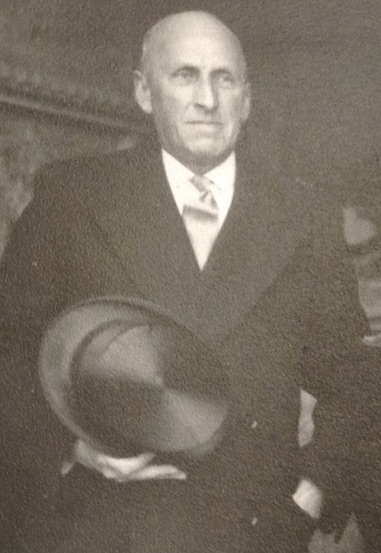

Personal details
- Born: 27 August 1892
- Died: 15 February 1970 (aged 77)
- Spouse: Hon. Ruth Evelyn Pease
- Children: 2
- Relatives: Walter Archer (father); Herbert Pease, 1st Baron Daryngton (father-in-law); Hugh Archer ("Sagette") (brother); Robert Blackburn (son-in-law); Kari Blackburn (granddaughter)
- Occupation: Naval officer, Diplomat

Norman Ernest Archer CMG, OBE (27 August 1892 – 15 February 1970) was a British naval officer and diplomat.

Archer was one of two Royal Navy officers stationed with the Russian Black Sea Fleet during the naval conflict in the Black Sea in 1914–1917.

After the war, Archer pursued a diplomatic career, including postings in Ottawa and Dublin.

He served as Principal Private Secretary to Anthony Eden as Secretary of State for Dominion Affairs from 1939 to 1940.

== Life and career ==
=== Early life and education ===
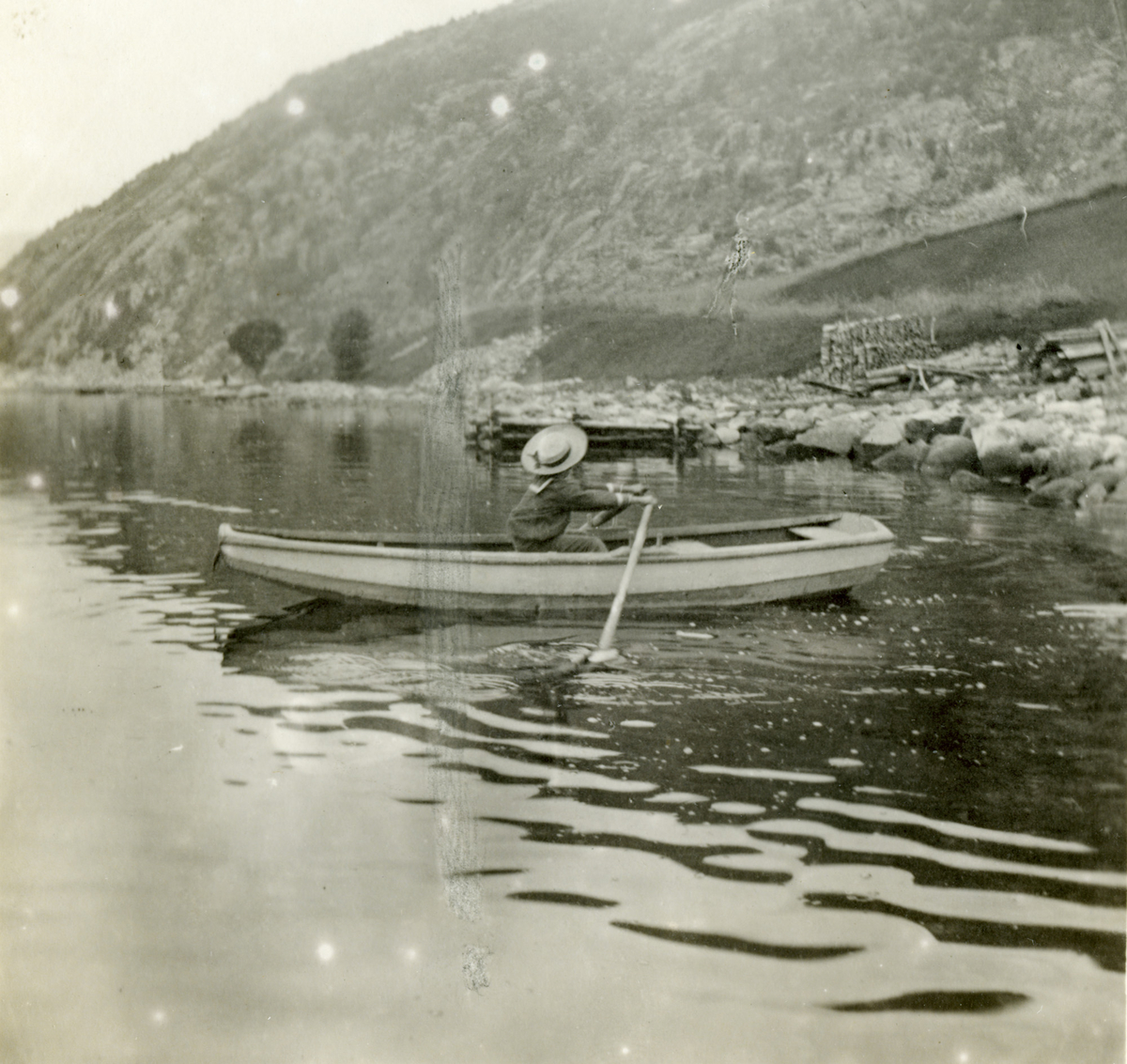
Archer rows as a boy in Norway

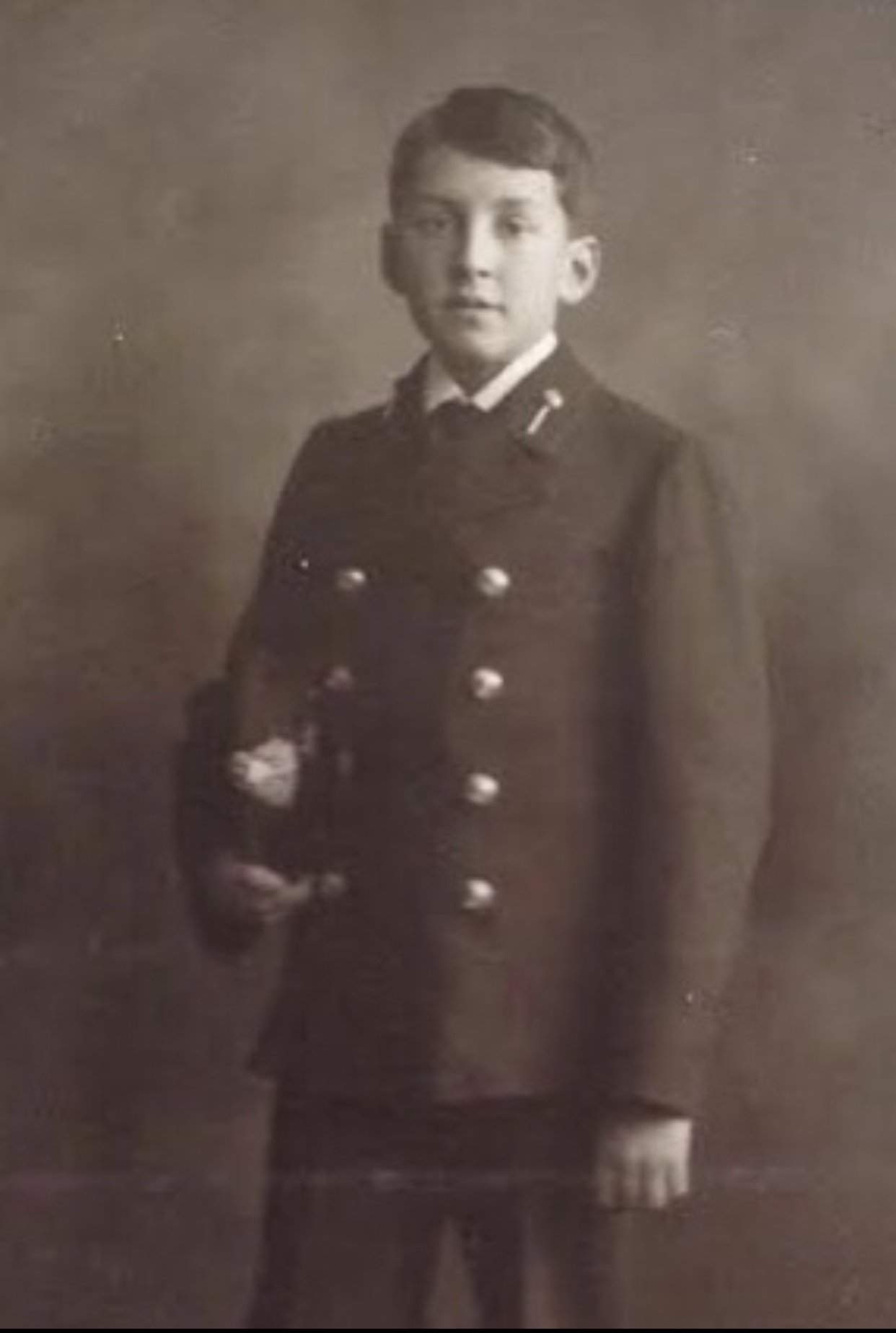
Archer at Osborne Naval College

Norman Ernest Archer was born on 27 August 1892 in Stavanger Norway, the son of Alice Lima Murray and Walter Archer C.B., Assistant Secretary of the British government's Board of Agriculture and Fisheries. Walter Archer was recruited in 1912 with the code name "Sage" by the Secret Intelligence Service's first director Mansfield Smith-Cumming to spy on German ships in Norwegian and Danish waters.

Norman Archer passed the Royal Naval College, Osborne's qualifying examinations in December 1904 to enter the College on the Isle of Wight in January 1905.

=== Career ===
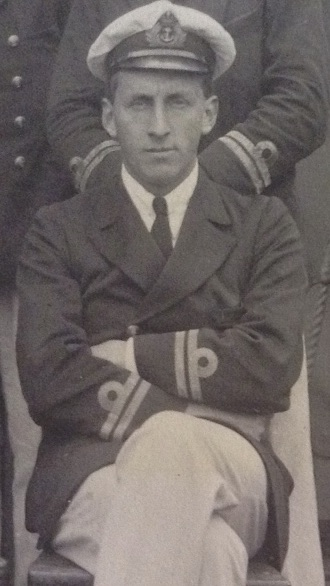
Lieutenant Commander Archer

Archer served in the Royal Navy between 1908 and 1921, gaining the rank of Lieutenant-Commander. As a young naval officer Archer served with the Russian fleet during the First World War. Archer spent most of his tour of duty in Sevastopol, the Black Sea Fleet's main base, but he was present when the Russians captured Trebizond from the Turks in 1916. According to historian Toby Ewin, "Archer both advised the Russians about British torpedo practice, and informed the British Admiralty about what the Russians were doing."

Archer entered the Dominions Office as part of the post-war reconstruction stream. Between 1932 and 1936, he served as the Official Secretary to the British High Commission, Ottawa.

From 1939 to 1940, Archer served as Principal Private Secretary to the Secretary of State for Dominion Affairs Anthony Eden and helped Eden with the relevant section of his memoirs.

Archer later served as Assistant Secretary to the Dominions Office, 1941–1944, and Assistant Under-Secretary for Commonwealth Relations, 1948–1949.

In 1948, as part of the British Representative's Office in Dublin, Archer was involved in attempts to ensure that Irish citizens in India were covered in the absence of diplomatic representation.

Archer was Principal Secretary to the United Kingdom Representative to Éire John Maffey's Office for two periods between 1941 and 1948. In "Spying on Ireland: British Intelligence and Irish Neutrality During the Second World War", Eunan O'Halpin writes: "MI5's dealings with Ireland were mediated through Maffey's office, where they were handled by the principal secretary Norman Archer (for two periods between 1941 and 1948). In addition to extensive dominions and colonial experience, Archer had been a career naval officer [...] consequently had direct knowledge of military affairs as well as civil administration."

Archer was appointed Officer of the Order of the British Empire (OBE) in the 1937 Coronation Honours, and a Companion of the Order of St. Michael and St. George (CMG) in the 1944 New Year Honours.

He retired to Norway and died on 15 February 1970 in Lambeth, Surrey, at the age of 77. He is buried in Sand, Rogaland, Norway.

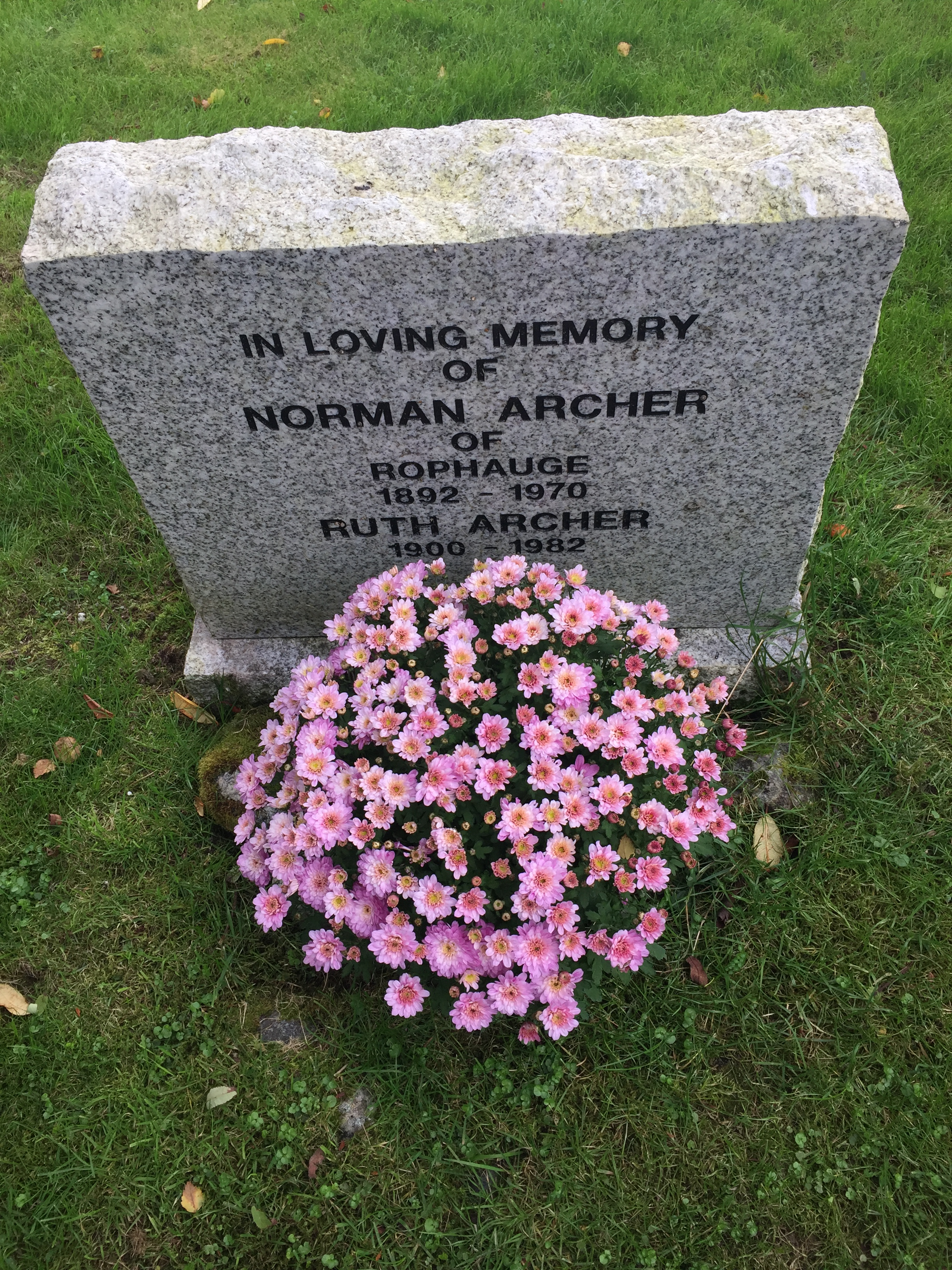
Archer's grave in Sand, Norway

=== Personal life ===
Archer married Hon. Ruth Evelyn Pease (1900–1982), daughter of Herbert Pike Pease, 1st Baron Daryngton and Alice Mortimer Luckock, on 30 June 1925.

They had two children:

- Esther Joy Archer (1926–1977), a botanist who married Irish educationalist Robert Blackburn.
- Ronald Walter Archer (1929–1992), who became vice-chairman of Unilever who married Catherine Archer.
