= Additional Civil Lord of the Admiralty =

Former British government official

Office of the Additional Civil Lord of the Admiralty
- Seal of H.M. Government
- Department of the Admiralty
- Member of: Board of Admiralty
- Reports to: First Lord of the Admiralty
- Nominator: First Lord of the Admiralty
- Appointer: Prime Minister; Subject to formal approval by the King-in-Council
- Term length: Not fixed (typically 1–3 years)
- Inaugural holder: George Wightwick Rendel
- Formation: 1882-1885, 1912-1919

The Additional Civil Lord of the Admiralty or formally the Office of the Additional Civil Lord of the Admiralty sometimes called the Department of the Additional Civil Lord of the Admiralty was a member of the Board of Admiralty first from 1882 to 1885 and then again from 1912 to 1919 who was mainly responsible for administration of contracts for matériel for the Fleet, supervision of the contracts and purchase department and general organisation of dockyards within the Admiralty.

== History ==
On 14 April 1882, George W. Rendel, a renowned civil engineer working for both the Elswick Ordnance Company and the Armstrong Whitworth Shipbuilding Company, was appointed as an Additional Civil Lord on the Board of Admiralty. The post was sometimes styled Extra-Professional Civil Lord or Second Civil Lord during the periods in question. The post holder was usually held by a person who was neither a naval officer or a politician it existed briefly until 1885 before being abolished. In 1912 the post was re-established and usually held by one person. In 1917 due to the increasing workload of the Civil Lord of the Admiralty extra civil lords were added however they were restyled as Second Civil Lord, Third Civil Lord and Fourth Civil Lord until 1919 when the office was once again abolished.

== Responsibilities ==
As of April 1882, the holder's responsibilities included (duties shared with Controller of the Navy):

1. Dockyards.
2. Steam Reserves.—as regard Ships.
3. Shipbuilding.
4. Constructor's Department.
5. Store Department.
6. Dock-yard Craft.
7. Inventions and Experiments in Ships and Steam.
8. Gunnery as relates to Materiel.
9. Promotions and transfers of Professional Officers and Workmen in the Dockyards.

Additional as of September 1912.

1. Contracts for Matériel for the Fleet (including Ships and their Machinery, Armour, Naval Ordnance and Gun Mountings, Aeroplanes and Airships), Works, Yard Machinery, and Stores of all descriptions. Contract arrangements in connection with the disposal, salvage, or loan of vessels or stores.
2. Superintendence of the Contract and Purchase Department.

NOTE.—Tenders for Ship's Hulls and Propelling Machinery, Armour, and important Gun and Air-craft Orders, will also be marked to the Third Sea Lord. General organisation of Dockyards, including provision of Labour and Plant, and all business questions in connection with the building and repair of ships and their machinery, whether in the Dockyards or in Private Yards.

Additional as of August 1916.

1. Contracts for Matériel for the Fleet (including Ships and their Machinery, Armour, Naval Ordnance and Gun Mountings, Aeroplanes and Airships), Works, Yard Machinery, and Stores of all descriptions. Contract arrangements in connection with the disposal, salvage, or loan of vessels or stores. Superintendence of the Contract and Purchase Department.
2. General organisation of Dockyards, including provision of Labour and Plant, and all business questions in connection with the building and repair of ships and their machinery, whether in the Dockyards or in Private Yards.

NOTE.—Important questions relating to repair of ships and questions of general administration which may affect progress on ships building or under repair will be marked also to the Third Sea Lord. NOTE.—Tenders for Ship's Hulls and Propelling Machinery, Armour, and important Gun and Aircraft Orders, will also be marked to the Third Sea Lord.

== Additional Civil Lords of the Admiralty ==
Included:

- Mr. George Wightwick Rendel, April, 1882 – July, 1885.
- The Right Honourable Sir Francis J. S. Hopwood, January, 1912 - 1917.
- Sir. Arthur Francis Pease, January, 1917 - January 1918.

== Second Civil Lord ==
- Sir. Arthur Francis Pease, January 1918 - 1919.

== Third Civil Lord ==
- Sir. Robert S. Horne, 1918 - 1919

== Fourth Civil Lord ==
- Victor Bulwer-Lytton, Earl of Lytton, 1918-1919.

== Departments under the additional civil lord ==
- Constructors Department
- Contract and Purchase Department
- Naval Works Department (administration of the programme of the works department).

== Attribution ==
Primary source for this article is by Harley Simon, Lovell Tony, (2016), Additional Civil Lord of the Admiralty (Royal Navy), dreadnoughtproject.org, http://www.dreadnoughtproject.org.
