= Robert Blackburn (educationalist) =

Irish educationalist

- Born: Robert Blackburn; 26 September 1927; Kilkenny, Ireland
- Died: 16 July 1990 (aged 62); Sand, Norway
- Education: St Columba's College, Dublin
- Alma mater: Trinity College Dublin
- Occupation: Educationalist
- Relatives: Kari Blackburn (daughter); Ian Bradley (son-in-law); Norman Archer (father-in-law)

Signature
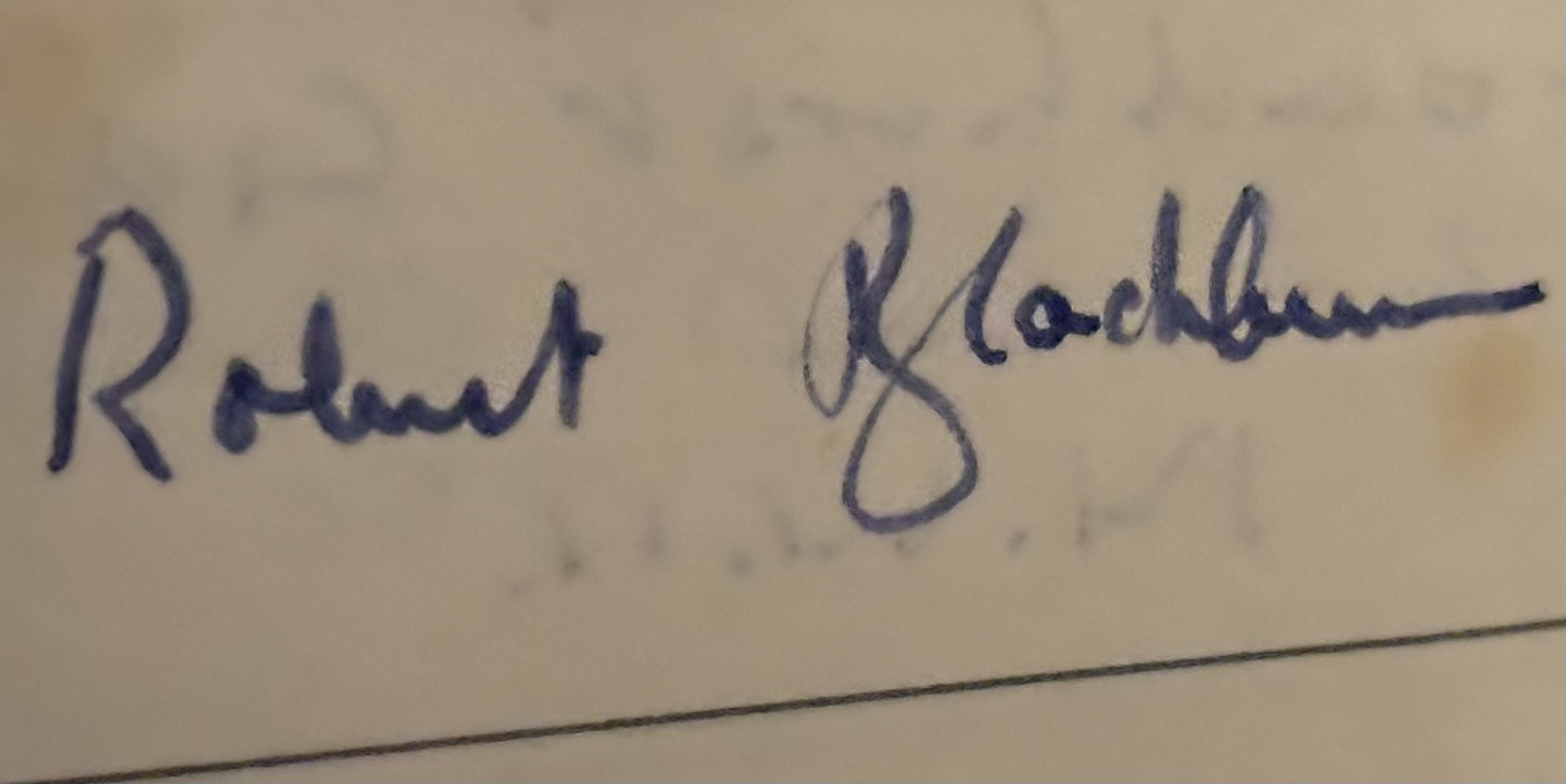

Robert Blackburn (26 September 1927 – 16 July 1990) was an Irish educationalist. He was an early pioneer of the International Baccalaureate Organisation (IBO) and was instrumental in establishing the first United World College (UWC) in the early 1960s. In 1968, Blackburn was appointed United World College International Secretary.

== Life and work ==
Born in Kilkenny, Ireland, Robert Blackburn attended St. Columba's College, Rathfarnham and, in 1946, Trinity College, Dublin, where took a first-class degree in History with gold medal and was captain of the rugby XV. As a student, Blackburn was an active member of the United Nations Association, where he met his future wife, Esther Joy Archer.

Blackburn started his teaching career at Downside School in Stratton-on-the-Fosse, Somerset, moving to Merchant Taylors' School near Northwood, Middlesex, in 1954. During this time, he supplemented involvement in the United Nations Association and the Council for Education in World Citizenship with work in refugee camps.

In 1962, he was appointed Deputy Headmaster and Director of Studies of the newly founded Atlantic College in South Wales, which was the first United World College. Blackburn said that the aim of the United World Colleges was "to further a particular educational and international philosophy that educational barriers can be broken down and that internationalism can be made effective at the 18+ age".

Blackburn was appointed International Secretary of the United World College international office in 1968, working with the then president of the organization, Lord Mountbatten of Burma. Together they visited many countries, particularly those with Commonwealth links, to establish committees which were to lead to the development of three UWC colleges in Blackburn's time.

Using his contacts, Blackburn also organised charity concerts with line-ups including Frank Sinatra, Bob Hope and Leonard Bernstein. In 1978 Blackburn became Deputy Director General of the International Baccalaureate Organization, taking on particular responsibility for Africa and the Middle East.

Robert Blackburn was one of the speakers at the World Goodwill seminar in London in 1988, where he set out his belief that:

"In the modern world, if education is not a global education, it is not an education for survival. As the world becomes more interdependent, there is a growing need for a curriculum that fosters international understanding and that can be followed by students in different countries. The International Baccalaureate Organization administers just such a curriculum."

== Personal life ==
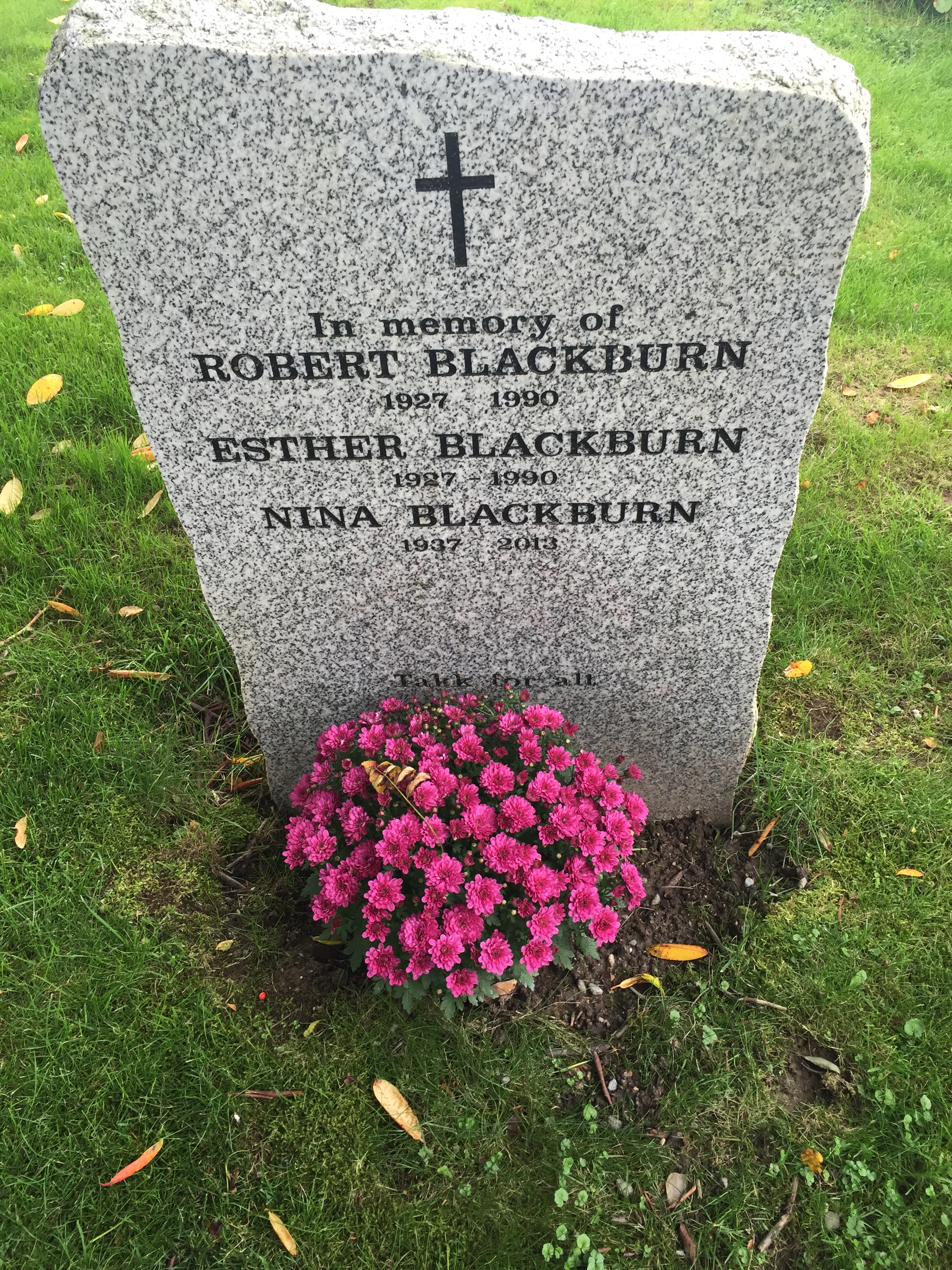
Blackburn grave in Sand, Norway

In 1952, Robert Blackburn married Esther Joy Archer, daughter of British diplomat Norman Archer. They had two daughters, Kari Ruth Blackburn and Lucy Patricia Blackburn. After the death of his first wife, Blackburn married Nina Little in 1980. In 1990, he died aged 62 while on holiday in Sand, Norway.
