= Pea (disambiguation) =

A pea is a small spherical seed or the seed-pod of various plants commonly used as a source of food, particularly Pisum sativum.

Pea, Peas or PEA may also refer to:

== Geography ==
- Pea River, Alabama, US
- Peas Creek, a stream in Iowa

== Chemistry ==
- Phenethylamine, also known as β-phenylethylamine
- Palmitoylethanolamide
- Poly(ethylene adipate)
- Polyetheramine; see Techron

== Organisations ==
- Peamount United F.C., football club near Dublin, Ireland, nicknamed "the Peas"
- Phillips Exeter Academy, a private boarding school located in New Hampshire, US
- Professional Esports Association, an esports advocacy organization and former esports league
- Progressive Education Association, a US organization dedicated to spreading progressive education in public schools from 1919–1955
- Promoting Equality in African Schools, a UK-based charity
- Produzioni Europee Associati, a former Italian film production and distribution company owned by Alberto Grimaldi
- Provincial Electricity Authority, a Thai state enterprise responsible for providing power to the provincial areas of Thailand
- Pontifical Ecclesiastical Academy

== Other ==
- Pulseless electrical activity, a form of cardiac arrest
- "Pea" (song), on the Red Hot Chili Peppers album One Hot Minute
- Peartree railway station (National Rail station code PEA), England
- Public Eye Awards, an award given to the corporations deemed most harmful to society
- Pea galaxy or "Green Pea", type of galaxy that appears green
- PEA (file format), the native archive file format of PeaZip
- Proto-Eskimo–Aleut language, reconstructed ancestor of the Eskimo–Aleut languages
- Alfredo Pea (born 1954), Italian actor
- Proximity extension assay, a biochemical technique

== See also ==
- "The Princess and the Pea" (1835), fairytale by Hans Christian Andersen
- List of crops known as peas
- Pease (disambiguation)
- Peace (disambiguation)
- Piece (disambiguation)
