= Baron Wardington =

Extinct barony in the Peerage of the United Kingdom

Baron Wardington, of Alnmouth in the County of Northumberland, was a title in the Peerage of the United Kingdom. It was created in 1936 for John William Beaumont Pease, Chairman of Lloyds Bank from 1922 to 1945. The third Baron succeeded his elder brother in 2005. The titles became extinct on the latter's death in March 2019.

The family seat was Wardington Manor, near Banbury in Oxfordshire.

== Barons Wardington (1936) ==
- John William Beaumont Pease, 1st Baron Wardington (1869–1950)
- Christopher Henry Beaumont Pease, 2nd Baron Wardington (1924–2005)
- William Simon Pease, 3rd Baron Wardington (1925–2019)
