= Pease family =

English wealthy and philanthropic family 1700s onwards

The Pease family is an English and mostly Quaker family associated with Darlington, County Durham, and North Yorkshire, descended from Edward Pease of Darlington (1711–1785). They were 'one of the great Quaker industrialist families of the nineteenth century, who played a leading role in philanthropic and humanitarian interests'. They were heavily involved in woollen manufacturing, banking, railways, locomotives, mining, and politics.

Notable events in their history include; their support of abolitionism; the founding of the Peace Society in 1816; the establishment of the Stockton and Darlington Railway in the 1820s and its later absorption into the North Eastern Railway; the establishment of Robert Stephenson and Company in 1823; the purchase and development of Middlesbrough from 1830; the abolition of bear-baiting and cockfighting through 'Pease's Act' (the Cruelty to Animals Act 1835); a bid to avert the Crimean War through personal interview with Czar Nicholas in 1854; the building of Hutton Hall in 1866; the establishment of The Northern Echo newspaper in 1870; the assembly of an important art collection, and the failure of the family bank in 1902. The latter forced several of them close to bankruptcy. Nine members of the family were Members of Parliament, including the first Quaker Member of Parliament.

Edward Pease (1711–1785) was the son of Joseph Pease (1663–1719) of Pease Hall, Felkirk, Shafton Green (now Barnsley), whose family had earlier come from Sikehouse, Fishlake, Yorkshire, and who had married Ann Couldwell (1681–1725), heiress of her uncles William Couldwell of Cudworth (near Shafton Green) and Thomas Couldwell of Darlington, yeomen woolcombers with family businesses established in the 17th (or possibly 16th) century. These wool businesses formed the basis of the Pease's later fortunes. Edward Pease's eldest son was Joseph Pease (1737–1808) who founded Pease Partners Bank (1761). His children included

- Edward Pease (1767–1858), railway promoter and woollen manufacturer.
- Joseph Pease (1772–1846), a founder of the Peace Society in 1817 and abolitionist.

== Edward Pease's descendants ==
Edward Pease had five sons and three daughters, including:

- John Pease (1797–1868), eldest son
  - Sophia Fry née Pease (1837–1897), philanthropist and political activist, married Theodore Fry
- Joseph Pease (railway pioneer) (1799–1872), second son. Railway owner, industrialist and first Quaker Member of Parliament. He had eight sons and four daughters by his wife Emma Gurney, a first cousin of Joseph John Gurney, including:
  - Joseph Whitwell Pease (1828–1903) - eldest son. 1st Baronet of Hutton Lowcross and Pinchinthorpe. Businessman and Liberal Member of Parliament (1865–1903). His two sons and six daughters by his wife, Mary Fox (daughter of Alfred Fox who created Glendurgan Garden), include
    - Alfred Edward Pease (1857–1939) - second baronet. Businessman and Liberal Member of Parliament (1885–1903). Settler and big game hunter in British East Africa. Married three times.
      - Edward Pease (1880–1963) - 3rd Baronet
      - Christopher York Pease (1886–1918) - killed during World War I
      - Alfred Vincent Pease (1926–2008) - 4th Baronet
      - Joseph Gurney Pease (1927-2023) - 5th Baronet
    - Joseph Albert "Jack" Pease, 1st Baron Gainford (1860-1943). Member of Parliament (1892–1917). Married Ethel, daughter of Sir Henry Marshman Havelock-Allan.
      - Miriam Blanche Pease (1887–1965), HM Inspector of Factories
      - Joseph Pease, 2nd Baron Gainford (1889–1971) Major, Lovat Scouts WW1, served Gallipoli, Bulgaria, France. Businessman. Married 1921 Veronica Margaret (1900–1995), daughter of Sir George John William Noble, 2nd Baronet (1859–1937), son of Sir Andrew Noble, 1st Baronet
        - Joseph Edward Pease, 3rd Baron Gainford (1921–2013)
        - George Pease, 4th Baron Gainford (1926–2022)
        - John Michael Pease (1930–2007)
      - Faith Muriel Pease (1902–1935), married 1924 Major Michael Wentworth Beaumont (1903–1958)
        - Timothy Beaumont, Baron Beaumont of Whitley (1928–2008)
    - Lucy Ethel Buxton née Pease (1868–1940) OBE, married Gerald Buxton
      - Rebekah Mary Buxton, who married Ralph Clarke (British politician) (1892–1970)
  - Elizabeth Lucy Pease (1833–1881), married John Fowler, an engineer who invented a steam plough.
  - Edward Pease (1834–1880) - founded Darlington library, and started the Society for the Suppression of the Opium Trade.
    - Beatrice Mary Pease (1866–1935) - married in 1885 the 6th Earl of Portsmouth, without issue. After her marriage, she lodged a lawsuit against her uncle Joseph Whitwell Pease alleging that his bank had mismanaged her inheritance. He lost the suit and had to pay 500,000 pounds which caused the bank to be effectively bankrupt.
  - Arthur Pease (1837-1898) - third son, Member of Parliament for Whitby (1880–1885) and Darlington (1895–1898)
    - Arthur Francis Pease (1866–1927) - first baronet. Coal owner. He was not involved in the collapse of the family bank, J. and J. W. Pease, in 1902 and was later a director of Lloyds Bank and the London and North Eastern Railway. Created baronet in 1920. He had a son and three daughters.
      - Richard Arthur Pease (1890–1969), second baronet
        - Richard Thorn Pease (born 1922), third baronet, director and vice-chairman of Barclays Bank
          - Carolyn Thorn Pease (b. 1957), married to John Silvester Varley, former Chief Executive of Barclays Bank
          - Richard Peter Pease (b. 1958), a fund manager
          - Nichola Pease (b. 1961), fund manager, married to Crispin Odey, City funds manager
    - Herbert Pike Pease, 1st Baron Daryngton (1867–1949). MP for Darlington 1898–1910, 1910–1923)
      - Margaret Alice Pease (1895–1975), first daughter.
      - Ronald Herbert Pike Pease (1896–1916), first son, died in the Battle of the Somme, Picardy, Normandy, France age 19 years.
      - Hon. Ruth Evelyn Archer (née Pease) (1900–1982), second daughter.
        - Esther Joy Archer (1926-1977)
          - Kari Blackburn, (1954–2007), BBC executive
        - Ronald Walter Archer (1929–1992), Vice-Chairman of Unilever
      - Phyllis Helen Pease (1904–1987), third daughter
      - Jocelyn Arthur Pease, 2nd Baron Daryngton (1908–1994), second son (Peerage extinct upon his death)
  - Gurney Pease (1839–1872) - fourth son of Joseph Pease. His children include
    - Wilson Pease (1867–1923) - ironfounder
    - Katherine Maria Routledge née Pease (1866–1935) - ethnographer associated with Easter Island
- Isaac Pease (1805–1825)
- Henry Pease (1807–1881) - Fifth son. Railway owner. Founded the seaside resort of Saltburn-by-the-Sea. Member of Parliament for South Durham (1857–1865), President of the Peace Society. He had one son by his first wife, Anna Fell, and three sons and two daughters by his second, Mary Lloyd.
  - Henry Fell Pease (1838–1896) - eldest son. Member of Parliament for Cleveland, Yorkshire

== Joseph Pease's descendants ==
The second Joseph Pease married Elizabeth Beaumont of Feethams and had two children:

- John Beaumount Pease (1803–1873) - married Sarah Fossick and had four sons and two daughters.
  - John William Pease (1836–1901) married Helen Mary Fox (1838–1928) (daughter of Alfred Fox of the Fox family of Falmouth who created Glendurgan Garden). With his brother-in-law Thomas Hodgkin founded the Newcastle bank of Hodgkin, Barnett, Pease, Spence & Co that became part of Lloyds Bank in 1902.
    - John William Beaumont Pease, 1st Baron Wardington (1869–1950). Chairman of Lloyds Bank (1922–1945). Amateur golfer. He married Dorothy Charlotte Forster and had two sons
      - Christopher Henry Beaumont Pease (1924–2005) - second Baron Wardington. A noted bibliophile; he was succeeded by his brother
      - William Simon Pease (1925–2019), third Baron Wardington; the title became extinct on his death.
  - Edwin Lucas Pease (c. 1838 – 24 January 1889) - Mayor of Darlington, killed while hunting at age 50.
    - William Edwin Pease (3 June 1865 – 23 January 1926) - MP for Darlington and chairman of Cleveland Bridge & Engineering Company
- Elizabeth Pease Nichol [née Pease] (1807–1897) - abolitionist, anti-segregationist, woman suffragist, and anti-vivisectionist In 1853 she married Dr. John Pringle Nichol (1804–1859), Regius Professor of Astronomy at the University of Glasgow, much against her family's wishes.

== More distant relations ==
Related Peases, but not considered Darlington Peases, were descendants of the first Joseph Pease's brother, Thomas Pease (1743–1811). His granddaughter, Hannah Ford née Pease was mother of Isabella Ford, the reformer, and Emily Susan Ford, the painter. His grandson Thomas Pease (1816–1884) married three times and had many children, with his third wife, Susanna Ann Fry, sister of the judge Edward Fry and aunt of Roger Fry. These children included

- Edward Reynolds Pease (1857–1955), a founder and longtime secretary of the Fabian Society. He in turn is father of
  - Michael Stewart Pease (1890–1966), geneticist at Cambridge University and member of the Cambridge County Council. He was also interned at Ruhleben during the First World War. After the war he married Helen Bowen Wedgwood (1895–1981), daughter of Josiah Wedgwood (later the first Lord Wedgwood). They were parents of, among others
    - Rendel Sebastian (Bas) Pease, nuclear physicist, FRS (1922–2004, died aged 81).
    - Jocelyn Richenda (Chenda) Pease (died 2005 as Lady Huxley), wife of the biologist Andrew Huxley.
    - Roger Fabian Wedgwood Pease, youngest son.
  - Nicolas Arthington Pease (1896–1983), received a Military Cross (with a bar) during WWI.
- Marian (May) Fry Pease (1859–1954), educator.

Joseph Pease's sister Ann (died 1826) married Jonathan Backhouse (1747–1826) founder of Backhouse's Bank in 1774 and was mother of

- Jonathan Backhouse (1779–1842) - banker who in turn is father of
  - Edmund Backhouse (1824–1906), English banker, J.P., and MP for Darlington. Father of
    - Jonathan Backhouse (1849–1918), British baronet and banker. Father of
      - Sir Edmund Backhouse, 2nd Baronet (1873–1944), British would-be oriental scholar and literary forger.
      - (Admiral of the Fleet Sir) Roger Backhouse (1878–1939), admiral of the Royal Navy and First Sea Lord 1939.

She was also great-grandmother of

- Robert Backhouse (1854–1940), well-known horticulturist and British archer in the 1908 Olympics. Through his mother, Katherine Aldam, he was also a great-grandson of Thomas Pease (1743–1811).
  - William Ormston Backhouse (1885–1962), English agriculturalist and geneticist. Son of Robert Backhouse (1854–1940).

and ancestor of, among others,

- Ernest Pease Hodgkin (1906–1997) Husband of Mary Constance Hodgkin née McKerrow (1909–1985) a well-known anthropologist and Girl Guide.

== See also ==
- Pease baronets

== Sources ==
- Tomorrow's History. A regional local history site for the North-East of England.
