= Gurney Pease =

British hotelier and politician (1927–2023)

- Predecessor: Alfred Edward Pease
- Successor: Charles Edward Gurney Pease
- Born: 16 November 1927
- Died: 26 December 2023 (aged 96)

Sir Joseph Gurney Pease, 5th Baronet (16 November 1927 – 26 December 2023) was a British hotelier and a Liberal Party politician.

== Background ==
Gurney Pease was the second son of Alfred Edward Pease, and his 3rd wife, Emily Elizabeth Smith. His elder brother would become Sir Alfred Vincent Pease, 4th Baronet. He was educated at Bootham School, York. In 1953 he married Shelagh Munro Bulman. They have one son, Charles Edward Gurney Pease, and one daughter, Jane Elizabeth Gurney Pease. In 2008 he succeeded his brother Vincent to the family baronetcy.

Sir Gurney Pease died on 26 December 2023, at the age of 96.

== Professional career ==
Gurney Pease was a director and secretary of a private company of hotel proprietors.

== Political career ==
In 1950, Gurney Pease was elected to Guisborough Urban District Council, on which he served one three-year term. He was vice-chairman of Darlington Liberal Association. He was Liberal candidate for the Bishop Auckland division of County Durham at the 1959 General Election.

General Election 1959: Bishop Auckland
Party	Candidate	Votes	%	±%
Labour	James Boyden	21,706	55.0	−2.7
Conservative	N.W. Murray	13,377	33.9	−8.4
Liberal	Gurney Pease	4,377	11.1	N/A
Majority		8,329	21.1	
Turnout		39,460	80.8	+3.8
Labour hold		Swing	+2.9	

In 1961 he served as President of the North East England Young Liberal Federation. He was Liberal candidate for the Darlington division of County Durham at the 1964 General Election.

General Election 1964: Darlington
Party	Candidate	Votes	%	±%
Labour	Edward Fletcher	21,751	45.2	
Conservative	Anthony Bourne-Arton	19,841	41.2	
Liberal	Gurney Pease	6,578	13.7	
Majority		1,910	4.0	
Turnout			83.0	
Labour gain from Conservative		Swing		

In 1969 he was elected to the Liberal Party Council. He was Liberal candidate for the Westmorland division at the 1970 General Election.

General Election 1970: Westmorland
Party	Candidate	Votes	%	±%
Conservative	Michael Jopling	21,253	55.3	
Liberal	Gurney Pease	9,426	24.5	
Labour	Roger Ward	7,757	20.2	
Majority		11,827	30.8	
Turnout		38,436	71	
Conservative hold		Swing		

From 1970-71 he served as President of the North West England Regional Liberal Party. He was Liberal candidate for the Penrith and The Border division at the October 1974 General Election.

General Election October 1974: Penrith and The Border
Party	Candidate	Votes	%	±%
Conservative	William Whitelaw	23,547	58.1	
Labour	Joseph Norman David Weedall	9,791	24.1	
Liberal	Gurney Pease	7,215	17.8	
Majority		13,756	33.9	
Turnout			72.9	
Conservative hold		Swing		

Pease did not stand for parliament again.

== Publications ==
- "A Wealth of Happiness and Many Bitter Trials" The life and journals of Sir Alfred Edward Pease Bt. (1992) William Sessions of York. ISBN 1-85072-107-6

Baronetage of the United Kingdom
Preceded by Alfred Vincent Pease	Baronet (of Hutton Lowcross and Pinchinthorpe); 2008–2023	Succeeded by Charles Edward Gurney Pease
