= John Pease (sociologist) =

American sociologist (1936–2024)

John A. Pease
- Born: March 8, 1936; Grand Rapids, Michigan; United States
- Died: March 12, 2024 (aged 88)
- Education: Michigan State University
- Known for: Co-Chairman of the Department of Sociology
- Scientific career
- Fields: Sociology
- Workplaces: University of Maryland, College Park

John Alan Pease (March 8, 1936 – March 12, 2024) was an associate professor of sociology at the University of Maryland, College Park, and co-chair of the department. He was also recognized as an advocate for strengthening academic standards, mentoring students, and making higher education affordable to students who come from less privileged backgrounds.

To University of Maryland students of the late 1980s, his name was familiar to frequent readers of the school newspaper, The Diamondback, as an author and chair of a comprehensive review of the state of affairs in undergraduate education at the university, dubbed the "Pease Report", which included recommendations for improvement in affairs affecting students and faculty of the University of Maryland. Pease had received a number of teaching awards during his tenure at the university.

== Early years ==
John Pease was born March 8, 1936, in Grand Rapids, Michigan, and was one of fourteen children. His family lived in Kalamazoo, where his father was employed by the railroad. He was raised soon after the Great Depression, in a family which, like others of the times, had become frugal, and as the first of his family to graduate college, he joked that he developed an interest in attending college only after he found that it was where all the girls from school had gone. After enrolling in college, he found another passion; curiosity towards social stratification, whether based on gender, race, financial station in life, or other imposed separations between people and similar issues. His studies turned towards Sociology and Anthropology.

== Education ==
Pease worked his way through college, attending Western Michigan University, earning a B.S. in 1960, and then moved to East Lansing, Michigan, attending Michigan State University, and earning a M.A. degree in 1963, and a Ph.D in 1968. He accepted a position as a professor of sociology at the University of Maryland, College Park in 1967 where he continued to teach until retirement.

=== "I'd Rather Be Studying" ===
Pease routinely taught four undergraduate courses: an introductory course to Sociology, Poverty in America, Social Stratification, and Inequality in American Society. He was known for his off-beat sense of humor and quirky habits, and was rumored to know the story behind the "Legend of Sara Bellum," about a girl who died from lack of studying. (Mysteriously, there is actually a marker of "Sara Bellum's" final resting place on campus, though no one has taken responsibility for it.) Many students enjoyed his lighthearted take on the course material, and some claimed that his course was the reason why they became sociologists. Pease was a recipient of the CTE-Lilly Fellows program in 1997-1998 from the Center For Teaching Excellence in addition to receiving the University of Maryland's Distinguished Scholar Teaching Award. He was an active member of the university's Campus Senate and a critical strategist in focusing on the most cost-effective ways of providing an increasingly higher level of education for all students, keeping in mind the students who suffer from economic hardships as he once did.

Pease was the founder of the "I'd Rather Be Studying” Gang, who made an attempt at having that phrase become the university motto, though it was struck down because it was said that it did not sound official enough. The University of Maryland, College Park is the "flagship" of the University of Maryland System.

== Unorthodox art of teaching ==
Pease worked to assist students who lacked equal academic backgrounds by employing a variety of techniques to teach students in his classes. Often he relied on comedy, as in the "Sara Bellum" stories and lectures. He had used topical songs of different genres as students file in for class, including protest music, (including folk music, or the blues), with topics such as the Great Depression, labor unions, and Civil Rights and artists like Pete Seeger, Bob Dylan and Billie Holiday.

== Price of education ==
The cost of tuition increases yearly at the University of Maryland, as it has in the majority of State-funded Universities. However, according to Pease, a major matter of concern wasn't only the rising cost of tuition, but the increasingly prohibitive hidden costs of the textbooks and course materials for class. Often newer editions of textbooks that are not fundamentally different from past editions are pressed upon the faculty for use in the next teaching period. In an article to the Washington Post newspaper, Pease had commented that, "Once they've published a textbook and there's a zillion of them out there -- that's it for their profit until they can come up with a new edition or some sort of technique to sell more books." The Post continues, "One of the techniques Pease and others cite is the 'bundling' of books with other materials, such as study guides, Web site access, test questions, CD-ROMs and more. These add-ons are helping to drive up the cost of books.

== Later work ==
On Friday, April 11, 2008, the Board of Regents awarded Pease with their highest honor given to faculty within the 2008 University of Maryland System; the faculty Award for Excellence in Mentoring.

In February 2009, Pease was awarded the Inspire Integrity Awards, a national award that recognizes professors for inculcating integrity in their students. The Award was provided by National Society of Collegiate Scholars, an honor society at 235 universities including the University of Maryland.

He retired as Associate Professor Emeritus in 2017, after fifty years as a faculty member.

After his retirement, Pease continued to reward promising students with an eponymous scholarship.
