= Joseph Pease (India reformer) =

English Quaker activist

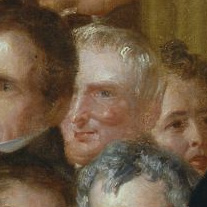
Joseph Pease in 1840 at the World Anti-Slavery Convention

Joseph Pease (1772–1846) was an English Quaker activist. Among a number of reforming interests, he became best known in the context of the British India Society.

== Life ==
He was a son of Joseph Pease (1737–1808) and his wife Mary Richardson, and a younger brother of Edward Pease. His father was a woollen manufacturer of Darlington, as was his brother Edward Pease, and he went into the same business.

Sometimes referred to as Joseph Pease of Feethams, he is often confused with his nephew Joseph Pease, the first Quaker Member of Parliament. He made his name as an Indian reformer, and his branch of the family supported abolitionism in the form given to it by William Lloyd Garrison. ("Joseph Pease of Darlington" may also refer to his father or nephew.)

Pease opposed the Corn Laws from 1815. He was one of the founders of the Peace Society in 1817. During the 1830s he became active in involving others in "India reform", which meant here commercial solutions to driving out the use of slaves in commodity production, as well as the abolition of Indian slavery. He found in George Thompson a speaker who would propagate this line. He drew in William Allen, and by the end of the 1830s the Aborigines' Protection Society was considering the matter.

The British India Society (BIS) founded in 1839 was short-lived, not surviving in activity beyond 1843, but Pease was a central figure in it. Its direction, further than support of Garrison, was to promote cotton production in India, seek allies among moderate Chartists, and oppose the divisive evangelical slant represented by the Boston Female Anti-Slavery Society (BFASS). At the World Anti-Slavery Convention of 1840, Pease spoke and accused the British government of being complicit in the continuing existence of slavery in India. A supporter of the Anti-Slavery Society, he wrote tracts for it, in 1841 and 1842. He engaged Dwarkanath Tagore on the topic of his Mansion House speech of 1842, finding it too militaristic. In 1843 British legislation made slavery illegal in India.

Pease and Thompson put emphasis on the BIS as an ally of the Anti-Cornlaw League, and free trade. Their slighting of the BFASS, however, undermined the international dimension of their efforts. A successful charm offensive by James Cosmo Melvill of the East India Company eventually caused Pease to soften his highly critical views of the Company.

== Family ==
Pease married Elizabeth Beaumont, who died in 1824. His second wife was Anne Bradshaw, whom he married in 1831. John Beaumont Pease (1803–1873) and Elizabeth Pease Nichol were children of the first marriage.

== Notes and references ==
- Turley, David (14 January 2004). The Culture of English Antislavery, 1780-1860. Routledge. ISBN 978-1-134-97745-1.
