= Frank Pease =

President of the anti-communist Hollywood Technical Directors Institute

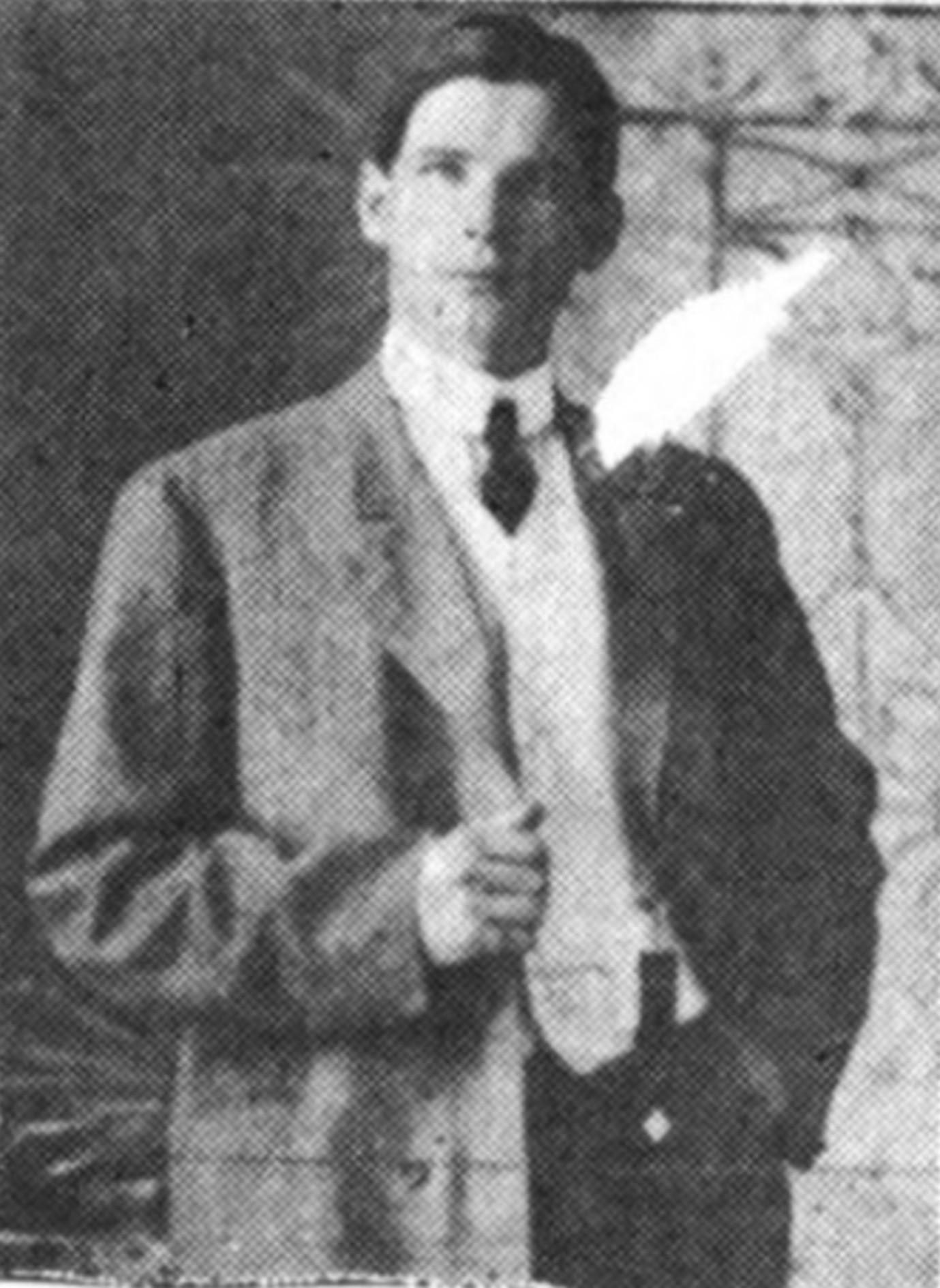
- Born: September 22, 1879; Boston, Massachusetts
- Died: January 12, 1959 (aged 79); Dade County, Florida
- Occupation: Anti-Communist propagandist

Major Frank Pease (September 22, 1879 - January 12, 1959) was president of the Hollywood Technical Directors Institute, an anti-communist activist organization during the 1920s and 1930s. His was best known for his opposition to Sergei Eisenstein's presence in the United States while the filmmaker was on contract with Paramount Studios. Due to Pease's campaign against the Russian filmmaker, the Fish Committee (predecessor to the House Un-American Activities Committee) investigated Eisenstein for contaminating American cinema with communist propaganda.

== Family ==
Frank Chester Pease was born in 1879, although some sources say 1881 or 1883, in Boston, Massachusetts. He also used the middle name of Clymer. On December 13, 1907, he married Belle de Mille Norris, 26, in Chicago while he was an art student studying sculpture. The couple had a daughter, Elizabeth, who died at the age of 6 months on June 28, 1909. The tragedy put a strain on the marriage and the couple divorced by the end of 1915. Pease married Mabelle Abbie Rose Abbott.

== Military career ==
Although Pease identified himself as a retired major in the United States Army, he held no such rank. He served as a private in 1902 and was attached to the Hospital Corps. He received a medical discharge in 1905 at the Presidio in San Francisco after serving at Cotabato, Philippines, where his right leg was amputated. He also suffered from bronchitis and hemorrhoids. He announced to the San Jose Mercury News in 1907 that he planned a world tour of foreign armies to learn their procedures and to help implement reforms in the U.S. Army, but his project never materialized.

== Early politics and journalism ==
Although Pease would embrace far right ideology, he flirted with the progressive movement and socialism. In Chicago, he briefly joined the Spirit Fruit Society commune, which eschewed materialism and advocated ending private property ownership. But his interest in the Spirit Fruit Society involved his attraction to Belle de Mille Norris, who was a member with only a cursory interest in the group's ideology. Belle left the commune and accompanied Pease to California. In Oakland during the first decade of the 20th century Pease became acquainted with author Jack London, an ardent socialist. He embraced for a short period the Industrial Workers of the World (IWW), a radical union, agitated against marital laws, supported prison reform and women's suffrage and welcomed unorthodox religions and cults. He expounded on these topics by contributing articles to radical magazines such as "The Forum" and "To-Morrow." He also was a contributor to "The Smart Set" and "The Seven Arts" magazines.

== Hollywood ==
Living a transient life for several years, he worked as a Red Cross field director in Fort Worden Point, Townsend, WA, during World War I. By the early 1920s, his writings of progressive politics had stopped, although he continued to write non-political articles for "The Smart Set" and art-related periodicals. It was during this period that his political ideology shifted from the progressive movement to the far right. He arrived in Hollywood on August 11, 1927, and began attending Actors' Equity meetings. He and his wife, Mabelle, lived on Sunset Boulevard in 1930 with their young daughter. He garnered a reputation among some actors for making wild accusations at Actors' Equity meetings that actors harbored communist sympathies. In 1930 he identified himself as a screenwriter, but there is no evidence that he wrote scripts or received screen credit. He also variously presented himself as a film director or agent, but there remains no evidence that he held any of these positions.

An early indication of the path Pease would take in film industry was an article he wrote for the January 4, 1929, edition of "The Film Mercury" in which he discussed the moral boundaries of dialogue in films as movies with sound became more common in cinemas. He argued that dialogue is a form of art and that audiences, and not film producers, should set limits on what constitutes moral and ethical dialogue. He essentially outlined an argument that it is appropriate for external forces to censor films.

In November 1929, he founded the United Character Actors' Association that purported to represent day actors, such as bit players and extras. However, day actors only earned $15 a day and Pease could not earn a living operating the association. His next project was the Hollywood Technical Directors Institute, which he operated out of his residence at 6557 Sunset Boulevard. There is no evidence that the institute had any employees or represented any technical directors. Pease identified technical directors as experts in their field, such as military personnel, who monitored the accuracy of specific professions depicted in movies and provided technical advice to film directors. Yet no film director had ever heard of Pease or his organization until Pease began issuing press statements that director Lewis Milestone's "All Quiet on the Western Front" (1930) was anti-American and anti-military. Pease characterized the film as "filthy" because it undermined the beliefs in the army and its chief source of inspiration originated from the Soviet Union.

== Sergei Eisenstein campaign ==
Shortly after his attacks on the Milestone film, Pease turned his attention to Sergei Eisenstein, the Russian Jewish filmmaker best known for "Ten Days that Shook the World" and "Battleship Potemkin." He was popular among the American left and cinephiles for his epic storytelling and affection for the masses. Paramount Studios invited Eisenstein to make pictures, and gave him a $100,000 contract and wide latitude to pursue film projects. Pease, however, began a letter-writing campaign to Jesse Lasky, vice-president of Paramount, and to Bud Schullberg, general manager of West Coast Productions at Paramount. Pease argued that Eisenstein was a communist propagandist. He also wrote a 24-page pamphlet, "Eisenstein: Messenger from Hell," that labeled Eisenstein as a "sadistic Jew steeped in Bolshevik atrocities." Eisenstein's filmmaking would undermine American values, Pease alleged.

Schulberg and other studio bosses were sensitive to antisemitic attacks, but they were more concerned with accusations of being un-American. Pease continued his attacks in letters, public statements and his self-published literature. Paramount remained resistant to the allegations, but artistic differences with Eisenstein, including adaptations of films that Paramount believed were not commercially viable, proved Eisenstein's undoing. Paramount terminated Eisenstein's contract in November 1931.

Whether Pease had any influence in getting Eisenstein fired from Paramount is debatable. He had no organized following and was often dismissed as a crank, but he also knew how to rattle studio bosses who were more concerned with accusations of being un-American than his antisemitic attacks. A combination of Eisenstein's cinematic vision, which clashed with Paramount's, and the negative publicity led to the director's departure.

== Post-Hollywood activities ==
In December 1931, Pease was in Paris, France, where he reported to police that he was drugged in a cafe and robbed of $1,000. He misidentified himself to police as an American diplomat. During this period, he was deported along with his wife from England for illegal distribution of anti-communist literature. According to an International News Service dispatch to a Boston newspaper in July 1932, he and Mabelle were deported by the British government on charges of "activities against the public interest." Pease spent three unproductive years in Europe in his attempts to agitate against communism. He returned to the United States in 1934. The Jewish Telegraphic Agency tracked Pease's activities throughout the 1930s, documenting his work as a fascist and antisemitic pamphleteer. In August 1937 he moved from New York to live in Coral Gables, FL.

He served as the National Commander of the American Defenders, originally called the National Film Committee of American Defenders, an anti-Jewish fascist organization founded in 1929 by Pease. By the early 1930s, American Defenders became primarily a publisher for Pease's pamphlets. Although antisemitic, Pease opposed the policies of Germany's National Socialism. He also was an avid supporter of the American fascist H. Keith Thompson and the antisemite William Gregg Blanchard II, the leader of the Los Angeles-based The White Front in the late 1930s and publisher of "Nation and Race" and author the booklet "Racial Nationalism."

Among Pease's published writings were "What I Learned in Nazi Germany" (American Defender Press, 1934) in which he attempted to link communism to the Third Reich, and "Pole to Panama: An Appeal for American Imperialism and a Defense of American Capitalism" (American Defender Press, 1935), which advocated American imperialism by controlling all lands from the North Pole to Panama as a means to solve internal and foreign problems. He also published through American Defender "The Hole in The Hauptmann Case?" (1936), which alleged that Richard Hauptmann was framed for the Lindbergh kidnapping, and "Technicians and Revolution: An Expose of Communist Tactics For Overthrowing The State" (1939).

== Death ==
Pease died in Dade County, FL, in 1959 and buried at Arlington National Cemetery. Mabelle died in 1966 and was buried alongside him.

== See also ==
- Red Scare
