= Allan Pease =

Australian motivational speaker

- Citizenship: Australia
- Occupations: Motivational speaker, author, professor
- Spouse: Barbara Pease (m. 1993)
- Writing career
- Language: English
- Genre: Self-help/motivational
- Website: www.peaseinternational.com

Allan Pease FRSA (born 1952 in Australia) is an Australian body language expert and author or co-author of fifteen books.

Allan Pease and his wife Barbara have written 18 bestsellers – including 10 number ones – and given seminars in 70 countries. Their books are bestsellers in over 100 countries, are translated into 55 languages and have sold over 27 million copies. They appear regularly in the media worldwide and their work has been the subject of 11 television series, 4 stage plays, a number one box office movie and TV series, which attracted a combined audience of over 100 million.

In 1991, Pease was invited to the Kremlin to host a body language training seminar for up-and-coming politicians including Vladimir Putin, then a 39-year-old former KGB officer, and has spent up to two months each year hosting seminars in Russia since then.

In 2009 he set up a recording studio in Buderim, Queensland.

Pease and his wife Barbara are signed up for cryopreservation with Southern Cryonics.

== Bibliography ==
- Body language (1981)
- Signals (1984)
- Talk Language (1985, with Allan Garner)
- Write Language (1988, with Paul Dunn)
- Why Men Don't Listen and Women Can't Read Maps (1999, with Barbara Pease)
- Questions Are The Answers (2000)
- The Ultimate Book of Rude and Politically Incorrect Jokes (2001)
- Why Men Can Only Do One Thing at a Time & Women Never Stop Talking (2003, with Barbara Pease)
- Why Men Don't Have A Clue & Women Always Need More Shoes (2005, with Barbara Pease)
- Why Men Lie and Women Cry (2006, with Barbara Pease)
- The Definitive Book of Body Language (with Barbara Pease) (2006, a revision of the 1981 Body Language)
- Easy Peasey: People Skills For Life (2007, with Barbara Pease)
- Why Men Want Sex & Women Need Love (2009, with Barbara Pease)
- Body Language in the Workplace (2011, with Barbara Pease)
- Body Language of Love (2012, with Barbara Pease)

== See also ==
- Why Men Don't Listen and Women Can't Read Maps, 2007 German comedy film
