= Peas Creek =

Stream in Boone County, Iowa, U.S.

Coordinates: 41.993039°N 93.893006°W

Peas Creek is a stream in Boone County, Iowa, in the United States.

Peas Creek was named for John Pea, a pioneer who settled near there.

== See also ==
- List of rivers of Iowa
