= Hugh Archer (Royal Navy officer) =

British civil servant and spy

Captain Hugh Archer DSO
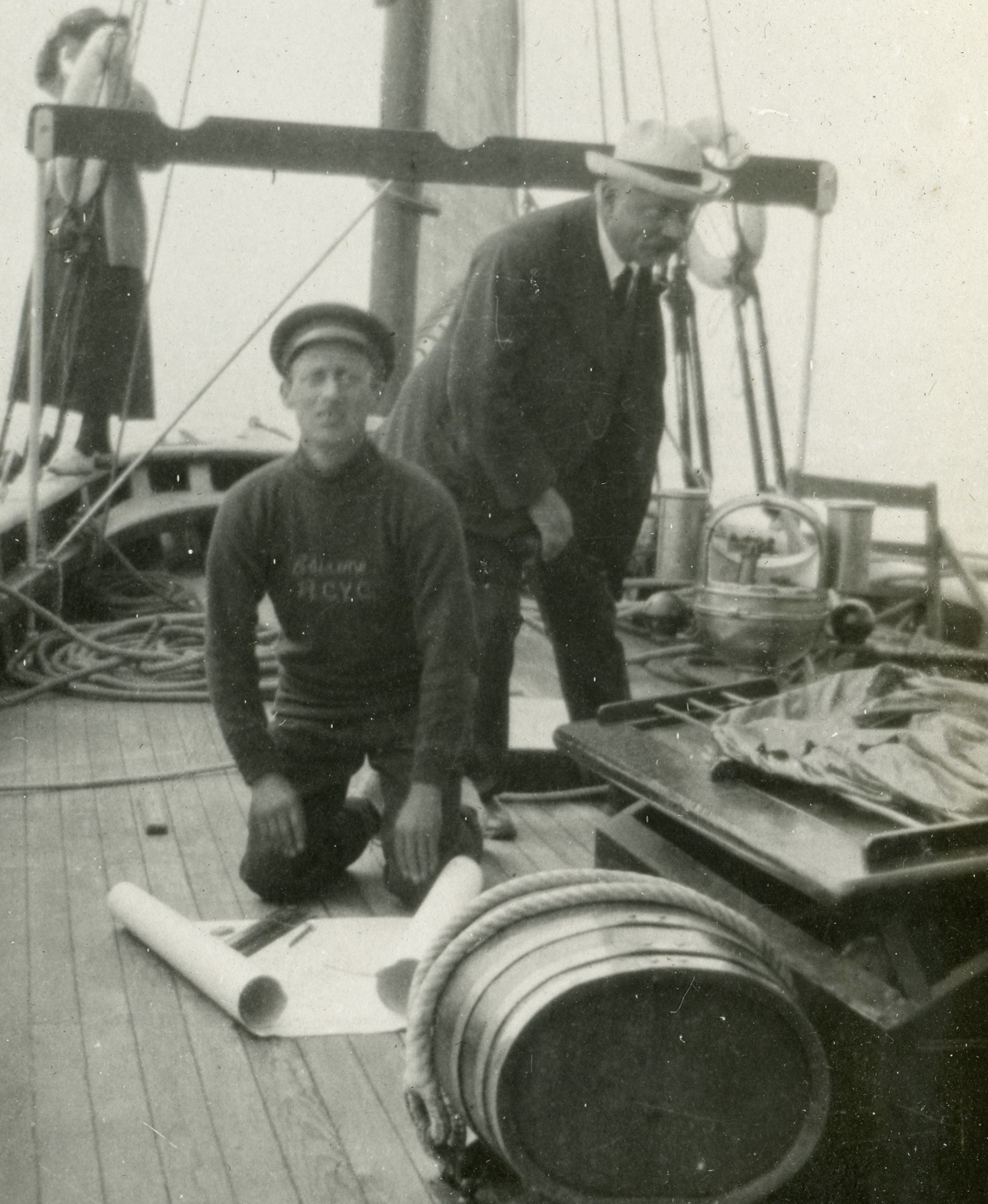
- Archer and his father aboard Edirene
- Born: Hugh Edward Murray Archer; 15 August 1879
- Died: 30 December 1931 (aged 52)
- Espionage activity
- Allegiance: United Kingdom
- Service branch: SIS (MI6)
- Codename: Sagette
- Operations: World War I
- Father: Walter Archer
- Relatives: Norman Archer (brother)

Captain Hugh Edward Murray Archer, DSO (15 August 1879 – 30 December 1931) was a British Royal Navy officer and spy.

In 1912, Hugh Archer and his father Walter Archer were recruited as agents by Mansfield Smith-Cumming, the first director of the Secret Intelligence Service, who gave them the codenames "Sagette" and "Sage", to spy on German ships in Norwegian and Danish waters.

== Life and career ==
In 1894, Archer entered the Royal Navy. Promoted to lieutenant in 1902, he served in the battleship HMS Empress of India and HMS Majestic.

He specialised in navigation, and was navigating officer of the cruiser HMS Iphigenia in 1906. From 1908, he was the first and navigating lieutenant of the cruiser HMS Perseus in the East Indies.

He retired in 1910, but rejoined the active list on the outbreak of World War 1 in 1914, and was appointed for minesweeping duties at Sheerness Dockyard.

Later he was appointed to HMS Attentive, parent ship at Dover Patrol and he was one of four minesweeping officers under the orders of Sir Reginald Bacon who were commended in the Admiral's book on the Dover Patrol.

Archer was promoted to acting commander and appointed a Companion of the Distinguished Service Order in July 1916 in recognition of his services with ships of the Auxiliary Patrol.

After the armistice he was appointed to the Minesweeping Division (Royal Navy). He was confirmed in the rank of commander with effect from 11 November 1918 and in August 1924 he was promoted to captain on the retired list.
