= Henry Pease =

Henry Pease is the name of:

- Henry R. Pease (1835–1907), U.S. Senator from Mississippi
- Henry Pease (MP) (1807–1881), son of railway pioneer, Edward Pease
- Henry Pease (Peruvian politician) (1944–2014), Peruvian politician
- Henry Fell Pease (1838–1896), British Member of Parliament for Cleveland, 1885–1897
