= Joseph Pease, 2nd Baron Gainford =

British Baron (1889–1971)

Joseph Pease, 2nd Baron Gainford (1889–1971) was a British hereditary peer and member of the Pease family.

== Family ==
He was the only son of the Liberal peer Jack Pease, 1st Baron Gainford and his wife Ethel Havelock-Allan, a daughter of Sir Henry Havelock-Allan, 1st Baronet He married 1921, Veronica Margaret Noble, (died 1995) daughter of Sir George John William Noble, 2nd Baronet.

Their children were:

- Joseph Pease, 3rd Baron Gainford (1921-2013)
- George Pease, 4th Baron Gainford (1926-2022)
- John Michael Pease (1930–2007)

== Career ==
Pease was educated at Eton College and reached the rank of Major in the British Army. He fought in both world wars before becoming Baron in 1943. He died in September 1971.

== Arms ==
Coat of arms of Joseph Pease, 2nd Baron Gainford
Crest Upon the capital of an Ionic column a dove rising holding in the beak a pea stalk as in the arms all Proper. Escutcheon Per fess Azure and Gules a fess nebuly Ermine between two lambs passant in chief Argent and in base upon a mount Proper a dove rising Argent holding in the beak a pea stalk the blossoms and pods also Proper. Supporters On either side a barbary wild sheep ram guardant Or. Motto Pax Et Spes

Peerage of the United Kingdom
Preceded by Joseph Pease	Baron Gainford; 1943–1971	Succeeded by Joseph Pease
