= Pease baronets =

Set index for Pease baronets

There have been two baronetcies created for members of the Pease family, both in the Baronetage of the United Kingdom. Both titles are extant.

- Pease baronets of Hutton Lowcross and Pinchinthorpe (1882)
- Pease baronets of Hummersknott (1920)
