= Edward Pease (railway pioneer) =

English railway promoter (1767–1858)

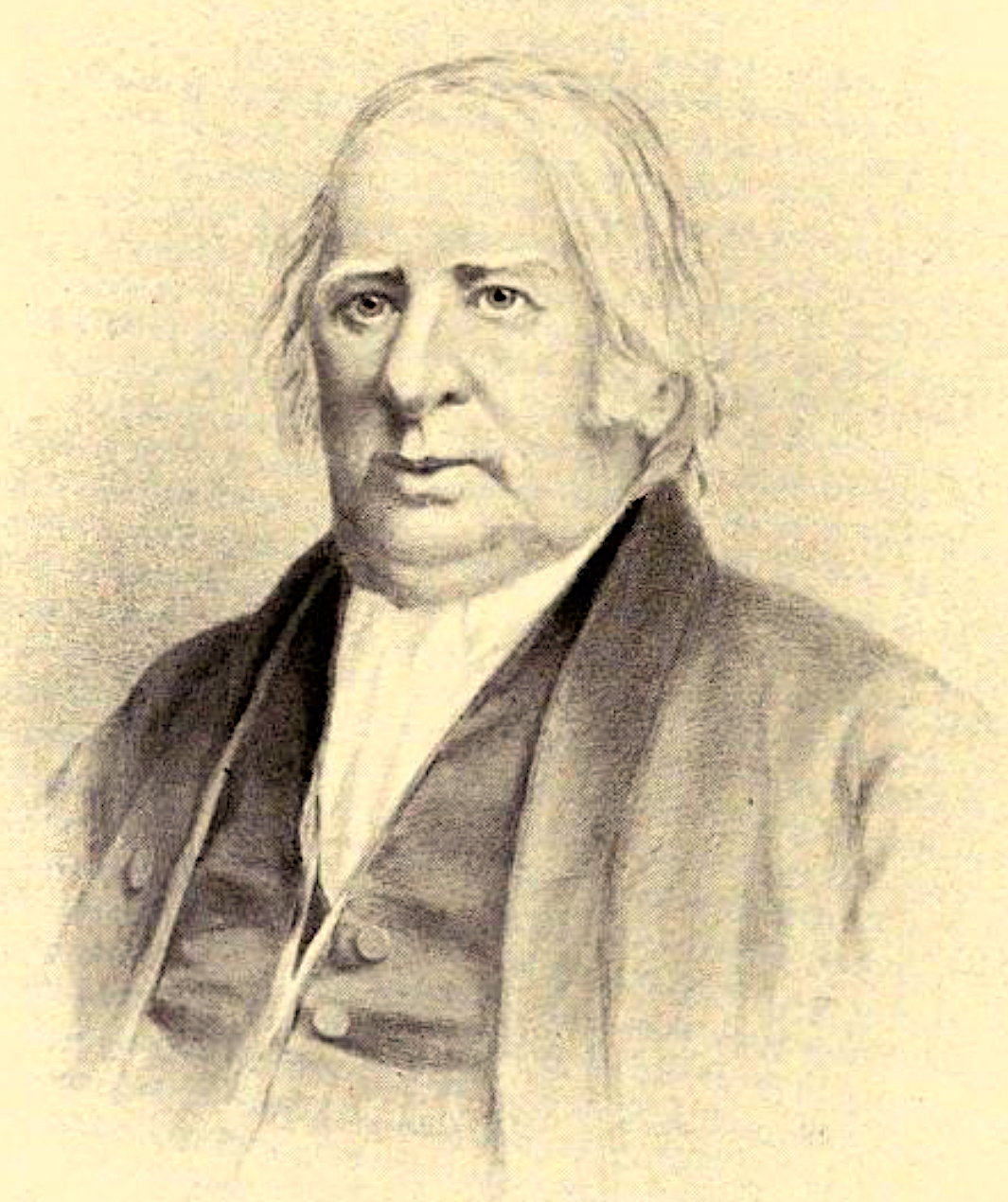
Edward Pease, railway pioneer

Edward Pease (31 May 1767 – 31 July 1858), a woollen manufacturer from Darlington, England, was the main promoter of the Stockton and Darlington Railway, which opened in 1825. He is sometimes referred to as the "Father of the Railways".

== Background and education ==
Pease was born on 31 May 1767 as the eldest son of the Darlington woollen manufacturer Joseph Pease (1737–1808) and his wife, Mary Richardson. The family were prominent Quakers: his brother Joseph Pease (1772–1846) was a founder of the Peace Society in 1817 and involved in the second, 1839 Anti-Slavery Society, for which he wrote tracts. Edward boarded at a school in Leeds run by Joseph Tatham the elder, and then joined his father's woollen business at the age of 15. On 30 November 1796, he married a fellow Quaker, Rachel (died 1833), daughter of John Whitwell, of Kendal. They had five sons and three daughters.

== Railway promotion ==
In 1809, Pease became involved (like his grandfather before him) in longstanding aspirations to improve navigability on the lower Tees, so that County Durham collieries could compete more effectively with those of Tyneside to supply coal to London. This was abandoned in favour of a railway. Meanwhile, Pease introduced into the scheme the steam engine maker George Stephenson, and an initial act of Parliament for a horse-drawn railway was immediately superseded by one for a steam-hauled line. Also prominent was a cousin of his, the Darlington banker Jonathan Backhouse, and in promoting steam, Nicholas Wood, the engineer and manager of Killingworth Colliery.

Pease, described at the time as "a man of weight, of prudence, of keen commercial instincts", was charged with showing that steam would be a sound investment, and his young son Joseph drew up the company prospectus. The scheme was approved by Parliament in 1821. Robert Stephenson and Company was founded in Newcastle in 1823 to manufacture locomotives, with Pease as one of the principals. Stephenson was put in charge of the project and the line opened on 27 September 1825.

The company initially provided only the track, which was hired out to whoever wished to run a train hauled either by horses or by steam. The transition to standard railway management was gradual, spurred on by frequent disputes between drivers about right of way and by the dangers of the higher speeds of steam locomotives.

== "Perseverance" ==
In 1829 Pease retired from the railway, whose running was taken over by his second son Joseph Pease.

Edward Pease had extensive connections among the Quaker banking community, which helped considerably in promoting the railway. He also invested strongly in 1823 in Stephenson's new company for building locomotives in Newcastle upon Tyne. He retired from business in 1833, but not from religious life as a Quaker.

Edward had cordial relations with Stephenson and his son Robert for the rest of his life. He died of heart failure in Darlington on 31 July 1858 and was buried in the Quaker burial-ground in Skinnergate. Samuel Smiles described Pease as "a thoughtful and sagacious man, ready in resources, possessed of indomitable energy and perseverance." An edition of his diaries appeared in 1907.

Locomotion No 1, the first engine to haul passengers by steam on a public railway, used to stand in Darlington Bank Top railway station as a monument to Edward Pease and the Stockton and Darlington Railway, but was later moved to North Road station, and again to the National Railway Museum branch in Shildon, County Durham, the former operating base of the S&DR, despite an extensive campaign organised by Darlington-born sympathisers who collected a 7,000-strong petition from signatories around the world (including members of the House of Lords and celebrities such as Sir Michael Palin) to stop the move. Due to various railway company takeovers, amalgamations or buyouts over the years, the obscurity of ownership was used to justify the bitterly resented relocation. On the day the foundation stone was being laid at Darlington for the pedestal on which to display it, Henry Pease concluded his speech by saying "he rejoiced at seeing the first locomotive about to be placed in a suitable position, so as to hand down to posterity a memorial of one of the greatest events the civilised world ever witnessed."

== External sources ==
- Edward Pease, National Portrait Gallery, London
- Claus Bernet (2009). "Edward Pease (railway pioneer)". In Bautz, Traugott (ed.). Biographisch-Bibliographisches Kirchenlexikon (BBKL) (in German). Vol. 30. Nordhausen: Bautz. cols. 1098–1100. ISBN 978-3-88309-478-6.
- https://web.archive.org/web/20050209121421/http://www.railcentre.co.uk/stockton/stocktonmenu.htm
- Darlington Quaker Photographs
- The Diaries of Edward Pease
