= Joseph Pease, 3rd Baron Gainford =

Joseph Edward Pease, 3rd Baron Gainford (25 December 1921 – 4 April 2013) was a British hereditary peer and a member of the Pease family.

He was the eldest son of Joseph Pease, 2nd Baron Gainford and his wife Veronica Margaret Noble. He was educated at Eton College, Gordonstoun and the Open University. He married 1953, Margaret Theophila Radcliffe Tyndale, (born 1925) daughter of Henry Edmund Guise Tyndale, M.B.E. by Ruth Isabel Walcott Radcliffe. The couple had two daughters, Hon. Joanna Ruth Miriam Pease (born 1959) and Hon. Virginia Claire Margaret Pease (born 1960). He succeeded to the title on his father's death in 1971.

Coat of arms of Joseph Pease, 3rd Baron Gainford
Crest Upon the capital of an Ionic column a dove rising holding in the beak a pea stalk as in the arms all Proper. Escutcheon Per fess Azure and Gules a fess nebuly Ermine between two lambs passant in chief Argent and in base upon a mount Proper a dove rising Argent holding in the beak a pea stalk the blossoms and pods also Proper. Supporters On either side a barbary wild sheep ram guardant Or. Motto Pax Et Spes

Peerage of the United Kingdom
Preceded by Joseph Pease	Baron Gainford; 1971–2013	Succeeded by George Pease
