= George Pease (architect) =

British nobleman (1926–2022)

George Pease, 4th Baron Gainford (20 April 1926 – 12 March 2022) was a British architect and town planner and a member of the Pease family of Darlington, County Durham, England. He succeeded his brother as 4th Baron Gainford in 2013, but did not use the title.

Pease was educated at Eton College and served in World War II in the Royal Navy Volunteer Reserve. He was an architect at the Royal Institute of British Architects and at the Royal Incorporation of Architects in Scotland and a town planner at the Royal Town Planning Institute; County Planning Officer for Ross and Cromarty 1967–1975 and a Scottish Office Inquiry Reporter 1978–1993.

He died at Moncreiffe Care Home in Perth, on 12 March 2022, at the age of 95.

Peerage of the United Kingdom
Preceded by Joseph Edward Pease	Baron Gainford; 2013–2022	Succeeded by Adrian Christopher Pease
