= Walter Archer =

British civil servant and spy

Walter Edward Archer
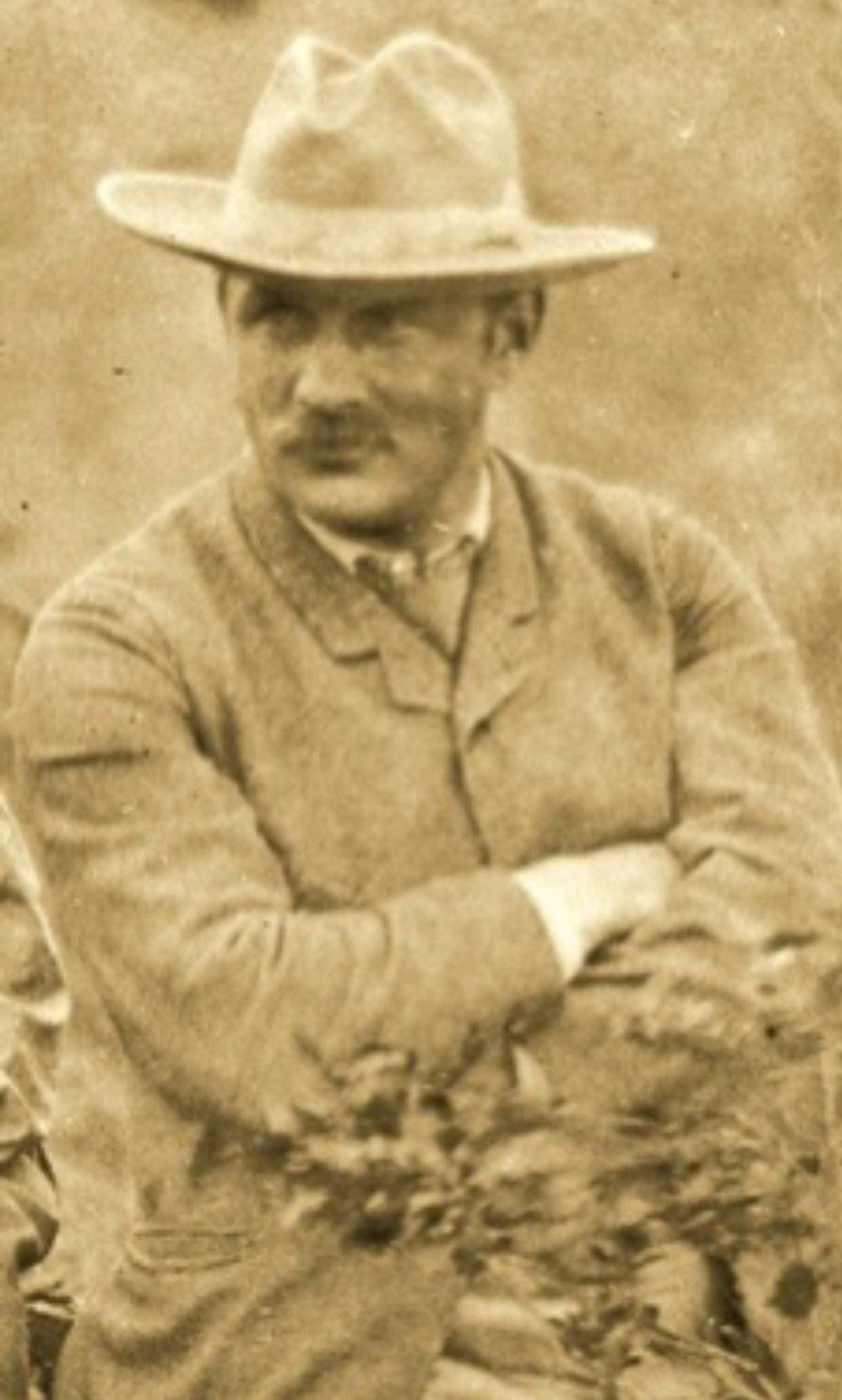
- Walter Archer in Norway
- Born: Walter Edward Archer; 4 July 1855; Hampton, London, England
- Died: 19 August 1917 (aged 62); Sand, Rogaland, Norway
- Spouse: Alice Lima Murray (m. 1878)
- Children: Norman Archer (son)
- Espionage activity
- Allegiance: United Kingdom
- Service branch: SIS (MI6)
- Codename: "Sage"
- Operations: World War I

Walter Edward Archer C.B. F.R.S.E. (4 July 1855 – 19 August 1917) was a British civil servant, spy and specialist on "the sex life of the salmon".

Walter Archer led the Fisheries Division of the UK government's Board of Agriculture and Fisheries from 1903 to 1912. Between 1908 and 1912, he served as President of the International Council for the Exploration of the Sea, the world's oldest intergovernmental science organization.

His interest in salmon took him to live in Sand, Rogaland, Norway.

In 1912, Archer and his son Hugh were recruited as agents by Mansfield Smith-Cumming, the first director of the Secret Intelligence Service, who gave them the codenames "Sage" and "Sagette", to spy on German ships in Norwegian and Danish waters.

== Life and career ==
=== Early life and education ===
Walter Edward Archer was born on 4 July 1855 at Hampton, London, England, the son of Captain Clement Robert Archer, 4th Dragoon Guards and Eliza Swetenham, Clement Robert's first cousin once removed - Clement Robert's father Lieutenant-Colonel Clement Archer, 16th Light Dragoons, was the brother of Anne Archer, mother of Eliza's father Clement Swetenham, also 16th Light Dragoons, who fought in the Peninsula under his uncle's command and at Waterloo.

== Salmon fishing ==
Archer was a key figure in early research into "the sex life of the salmon" and in efforts to protect it from commercial netting. He set up home in Norway, having secured the fishing rights to the Suldalslågen, a major salmon river in 1884.

It was salmon fishing that was the primary interest of Walter Archer when he came to Sand, Rogaland. He leased all rights to salmon fishing in the entire Suldalslågen watercourse for a period of 40 years, from 1884 to 1924. Salmon stairs were built in the Sandsfossen waterfall in Sand, a hatchery was started, salmon were marked as part of an extensive work to protect and strengthen the salmon stock. For the first time in hundreds of years, the fish could go undisturbed by anything other than sport fishing with rod and line on the entire stretch.

In 1892, Archer was appointed Chief Inspector of Salmon Fisheries in Scotland. He left Scotland in 1898 to take up the position of Inspector of Fisheries for England and Wales.

As Assistant Secretary, Archer was in charge of the Fisheries Division of the Board of Agriculture and Fisheries since its establishment in October 1903. He was a member of the Royal Commission on Salmon Fisheries, 1900–1902, the Committee on Ichthyological Research and in 1908, Archer became President of the International Council for the Exploration of the Sea, the world's oldest intergovernmental science organization.

On 3 May 1912, The Times reported that Archer had been compelled to "retire from the public service owing to ill-health".

== Espionage ==
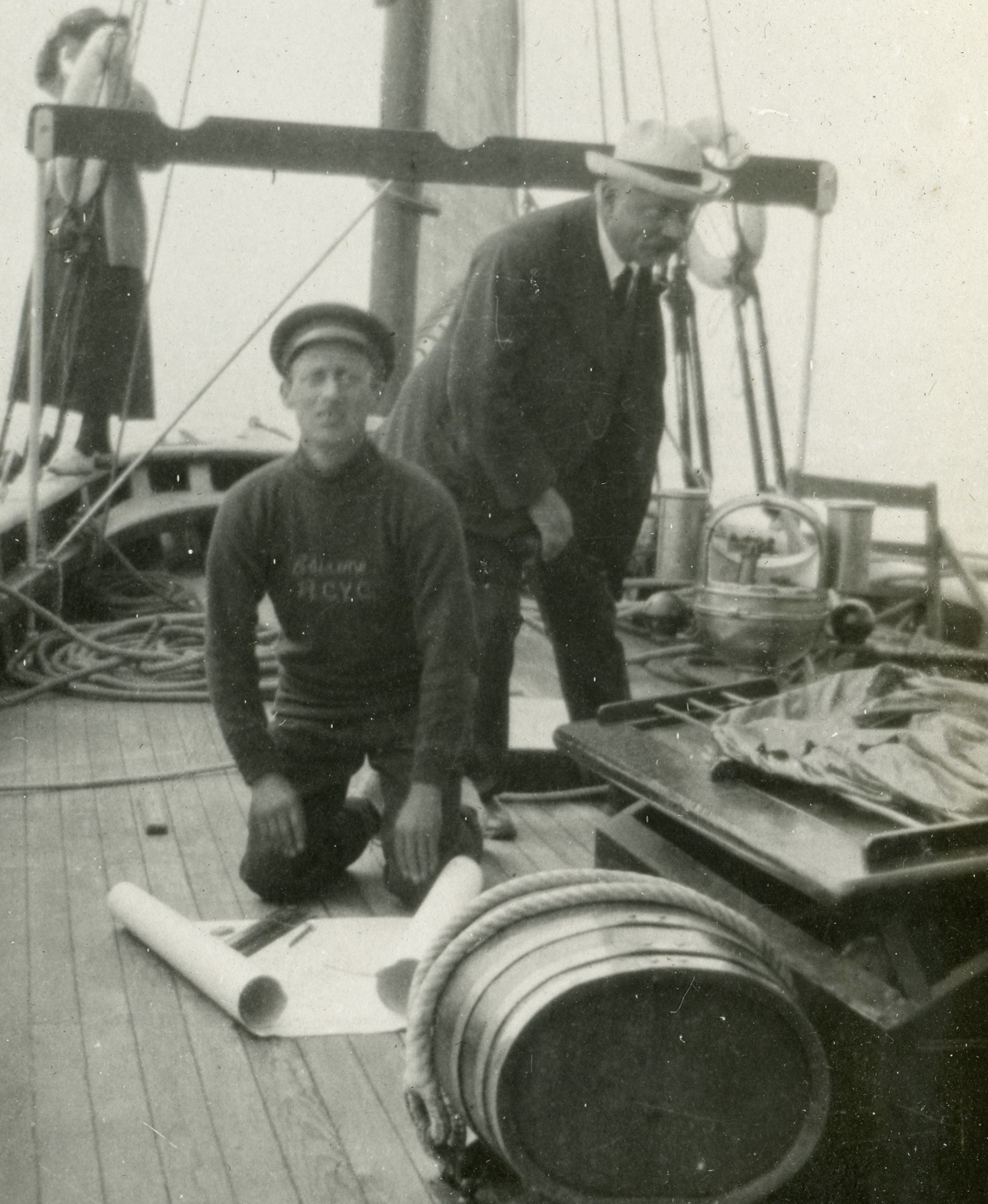
"Sagette" and "Sage" on Edirene

At the end of 1912, Walter Archer and his eldest son Hugh were recruited with the codenames "Sage" and "Sagette" by Sir Mansfield Smith-Cumming, the first director of the Secret Intelligence Service, to spy on German ships off the coast of Southern Norway and Denmark.

Hugh was a former naval lieutenant and specialist navigator. They were "intimately acquainted with both countries".

They were paid £1,200 to spend a year ship-watching and fulfilling other naval requirements and planned to sail around the coasts of Norway and Denmark in a private yacht, recruiting lighthouse keepers, ships' pilots and coast guards to report German naval movements.

"Sage" and "Sagette" were discharged by Cumming during a meeting at the Union Club on 23 May 1913, with "Sagette" kept on for a further 6 months.

== Personal life ==
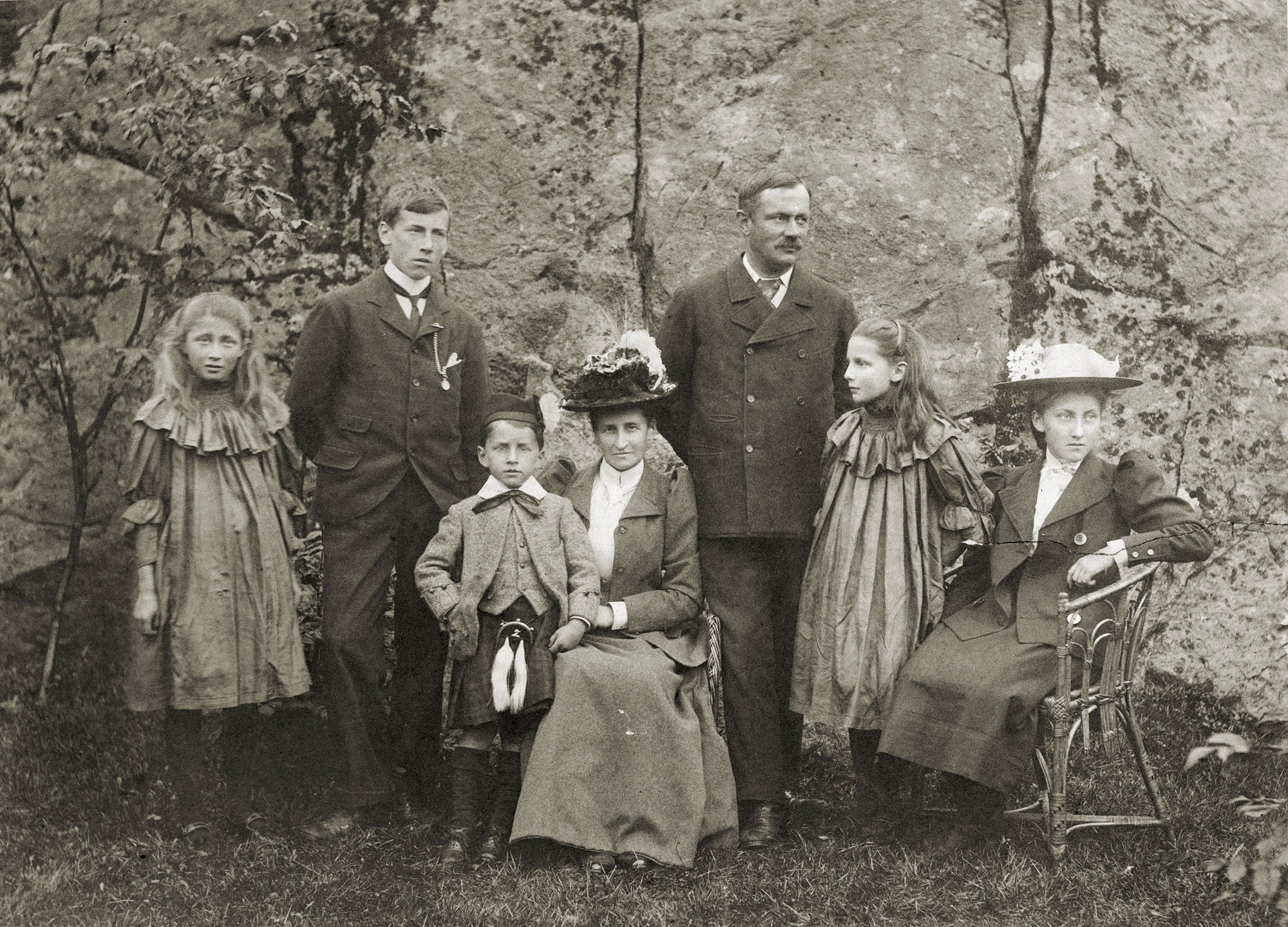
L to R is Ruth, Harold, Norman, Alice, Walter, Esther and Olive.

Archer married Alice Lima Hay Murray, third daughter of Robert Hay Murray, great-grandson of John Murray, 3rd Duke of Atholl and grandson of Thomas Hay, 9th Earl of Kinnoull, and Elizabeth Gregson, on 17 October 1878, aged 23 years old.

They had six children:

- Hugh b. 1879
- Harold b. 1880
- Olive b. 1882
- Twins Ruth and Esther b. 1886
- Future British diplomat Norman Ernest Archer, b. 1892.

Walter Archer died on 19 August 1917 at Sand, Rogaland, where he is buried.
