= Beaumont Pease, 1st Baron Wardington =

John William Beaumont Pease, 1st Baron Wardington (4 July 1869 – 7 August 1950), was a British banker.

== Biography ==
Beaumont "Montie" Pease was the son of Helen Maria and John William Pease of Pendower, Newcastle-upon-Tyne, and of Nether Grange, Northumberland.

He served as Chairman of Lloyds Bank from 1922 to 1945 and of the Bank of London and South Africa from 1922 to 1947. In 1936 he was raised to the peerage as Baron Wardington, of Alnmouth in the County of Northumberland.

From 1917 he lived in Oxfordshire, at Wardington Manor, and commissioned Randall Wells to remodel it.

Pease was a prominent amateur golfer representing England, in the annual amateur international against Scotland, each year from 1903 to 1906. He competed in the Amateur Championship most years from 1893 to 1935. He was captain of the R&A and later became president of the English Golf Union.

== Marriage and issue ==
Lord Wardington married the Hon. Dorothy Charlotte Forster, daughter of Henry Forster, 1st Baron Forster, and Rachel Cecily Douglas-Scott-Montagu and widow of the Hon. Harold Lubbock, on 4 April 1923. They had two sons, Christopher and William. Lord Wardington died in August 1950, aged 81, and was succeeded in the barony by his eldest son Christopher.

== Arms ==
Coat of arms of Beaumont Pease, 1st Baron Wardington

Motto
Pax Et Spes

Peerage of the United Kingdom
New creation	Baron Wardington; 1936–1950	Succeeded by Christopher Pease
