= Sir Arthur Pease, 1st Baronet =

English coal owner and public servant (1866–1927)

Sir Arthur Pease Bt DL
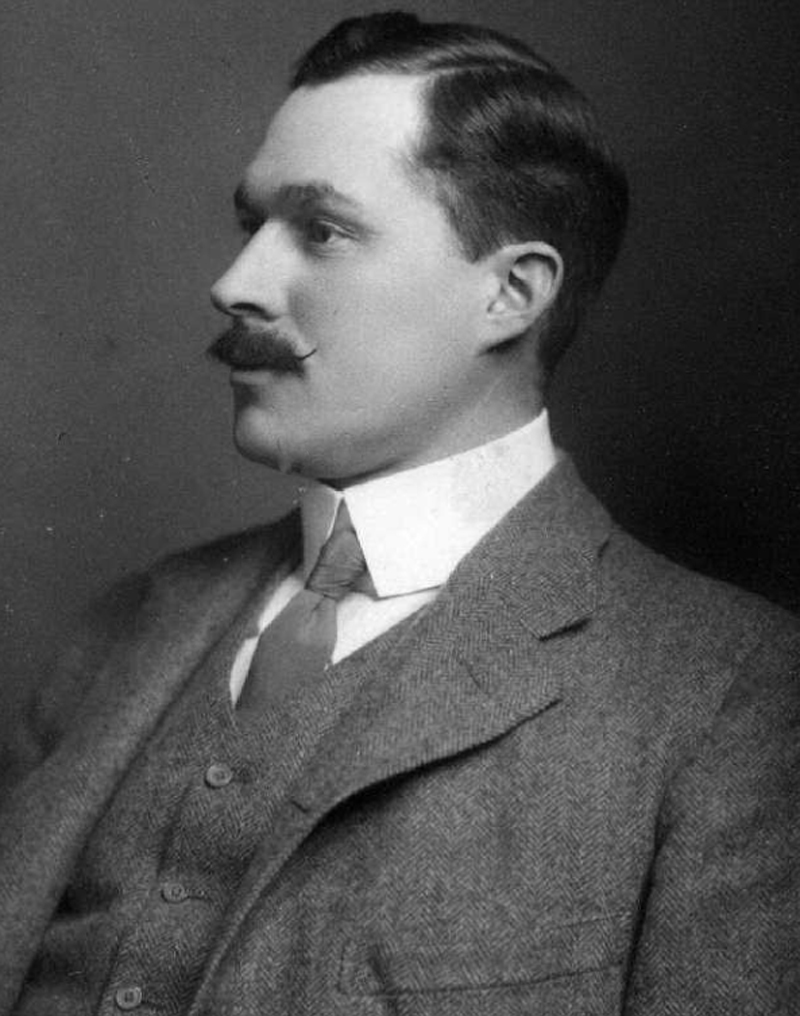
- Arthur Pease, c. 1890

Additional Civil Lord of the Admiralty
- In office January 1918 – March 1919

Personal details
- Born: Arthur Francis Pease; 11 March 1866 Hummersknott, Darlington, County Durham, England
- Died: 23 November 1927 (aged 61)
- Parent: Arthur Pease (father)
- Relatives: Herbert Pease (brother); Frank O'Brien Wilson (son-in-law)
- Education: Brighton College
- Alma mater: Trinity College, Cambridge
- Occupation: Coal owner

Sir Arthur Francis Pease, 1st Baronet, DL (11 March 1866 – 23 November 1927) was an English coal owner and public servant.

He was a member of the Quaker Pease family of Darlington, born in Hummersknott, a suburb of Darlington, the son of the coal owner and Member of Parliament Arthur Pease, and the brother of the politician Herbert Pike Pease, 1st Baron Daryngton. He was educated at Brighton College and Trinity College, Cambridge, and in 1888 joined the family firm, Pease & Partners Ltd, of which he later became chairman.

Pease eventually also became chairman of Middlesbrough Estate Ltd, North-Eastern Improved Dwellings Company, William Whitwell & Co, and the Durham & North Yorkshire Public House Trust, and a director of the North Eastern Railway Company/London and North Eastern Railway Company, Lloyds Bank, Horden Collieries Ltd, the Forth Bridge Railway Company, the National Benzole Company, and a number of others.

Pease was appointed a deputy lieutenant of County Durham in December 1906 and High Sheriff of Durham for 1920–21. He became prominent as a representative of the employers in negotiations with the Miners' Federation of Great Britain and favoured hard responses to worker militancy. He was a member of a number of government committees. He served as Additional Civil Lord of the Admiralty from 1918 to 1919, and for this he was created a baronet in the 1920 Birthday Honours. He rented Middleton Lodge in North Yorkshire, where he lived until his death.

Pease died of a cerebral haemorrhage during a board meeting of Horden Collieries Ltd on 23 November 1927. On his death he was succeeded by his only son, Richard Arthur Pease. He also had three daughters, the youngest of whom, Elizabeth Frances, married Sir Frank O'Brien Wilson, a member of the Legislative Council of Kenya.

== Footnotes ==
Baronetage of the United Kingdom
New creation	Baronet (of Hummersknott); 1920–1927	Succeeded by Richard Arthur Pease
