= Herbert Pease, 1st Baron Daryngton =

British politician (1867–1949)

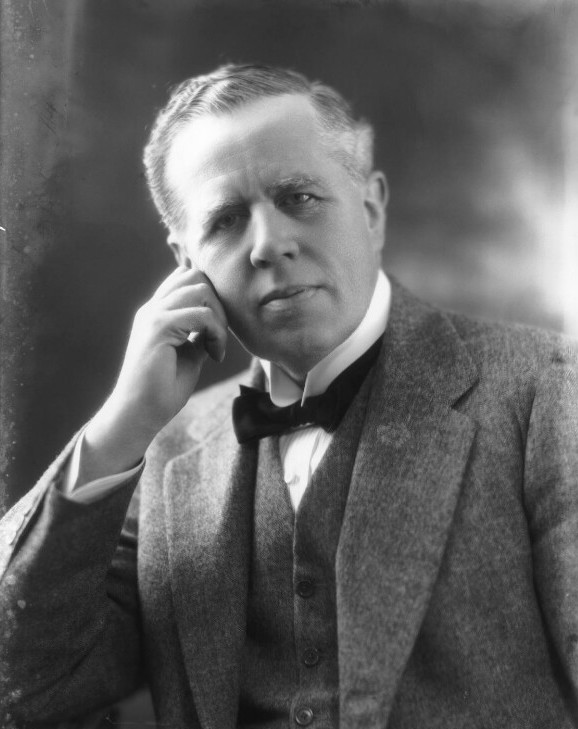
Herbert Pease, 1st Baron Daryngton

Herbert Pike Pease, 1st Baron Daryngton, PC (7 May 1867 – 10 May 1949), was a British politician.

== Biography ==
Pease was born into a wealthy family, the son of the politician Arthur Pease and his wife Mary Lecky née Pike. His brother was (Sir) Arthur Francis Pease. Both were educated at Brighton College. He attended Trinity Hall, Cambridge.

Pease served as Liberal Unionist then Unionist MP for Darlington 1898–1910 and from 1910–1923; he lost reelection in January 1910 before returning in December of that same year. For some years he was a party whip. From 1915 until 1922 he was Assistant Postmaster General. He was created a Privy Councillor in 1917.

On 12 February 1923, he was created Baron Daryngton, of Witley in the County of Surrey.

For 25 years he was either Chairman or Vice-Chairman of the House of Laity of the Church Assembly of the Church of England, the predecessor of the General Synod.

The Daryngton peerage passed to the surviving son Jocelyn Arthur Pease, 2nd Baron Daryngton (30 May 1908 – 5 April 1994) on his death, with whom it became extinct.

== Marriage and issue ==
In 1894 he married Alice Luckock; they had two sons and three daughters. Alice died in 1948. Their elder son, Ronald Herbert Pike Pease, was killed on 15 September 1916 during the Battle of the Somme in France. The inscription chosen for his elder son's gravestone in France was: "'QUIT YOU LIKE MEN BE STRONG' I COR. XVI.13". His daughter Ruth Evelyn Pease married Norman Ernest Archer, son of Walter Archer C.B., Assistant Secretary at the government's Board of Agriculture and Fisheries.

Coat of arms of Herbert Pease, 1st Baron Daryngton
Crest Upon the capital of an ionic column a dove rising holding in the beak a pea stalk all Proper. Escutcheon Azure a fess between in chief two lambs passant Argent and in base a wreath of laurel Or. Supporters On either side a dove wings addorsed holding in the beak a pea stalk all Proper. Motto Pax Et Spes

Parliament of the United Kingdom
Preceded by Arthur Pease	Member of Parliament for Darlington; 1898–January 1910	Succeeded by Trebitsch Lincoln
Preceded by Trebitsch Lincoln	Member of Parliament for Darlington; December 1910–1923	Succeeded by William Edwin Pease
Church of England titles
Preceded by The Lord Stuart of Wortley	Third Church Estates Commissioner; 1926–1948	Succeeded by The Lord Tovey
Peerage of the United Kingdom
New creation	Baron Daryngton; 1923–1949	Succeeded by Jocelyn Arthur Pease
