= Darlington by-election =

Darlington by-election may refer to one of three parliamentary by-elections for the British House of Commons constituency of Darlington, in County Durham:

- 1923 Darlington by-election
- 1926 Darlington by-election
- 1983 Darlington by-election
