= Benjamin Usher =

English cricketer

Personal information
- Full name: Benjamin Che Usher
- Born: 3 February 1970 (age 56); Wycliffe, County Durham, England
- Batting: Right-handed
- Bowling: Right-arm medium
- Relatives: Charles Peat (grandfather); Oscar Usher (son)

Domestic team information
- Years: Team
- 1999–2000: Durham Cricket Board

Career statistics
Competition	LA
Matches	10
Runs scored	76
Batting average	19.00
100s/50s	–/–
Top score	32
Balls bowled	380
Wickets	6
Bowling average	51.16
5 wickets in innings	–
10 wickets in match	–
Best bowling	2/30
Catches/stumpings	1/–
- Source: Cricinfo, 5 November 2010

Benjamin Che Usher (born 3 February 1970) is a former English cricketer. Usher was a right-handed batsman who bowls right-arm medium pace. He was born at Wycliffe, County Durham.

Usher's debut List A match came for a combined British Universities team against Worcestershire in the 1992 Benson and Hedges Cup. He represented the team in 4 List A matches in 1992, the last of which came against Glamorgan.

Usher later made his debut for Northumberland in the 1996 Minor Counties Championship, playing 2 matches against Lincolnshire and Cambridgeshire. He also represented the county in a single MCCA Knockout Trophy match against Lincolnshire in 1996.

His next appearance in List A cricket came when he represented the Durham Cricket Board against the Gloucestershire Cricket Board in the 1999 NatWest Trophy. From 1999 to 2000, he represented the Board in 6 List A matches, the last of which came against Northamptonshire in the 2000 NatWest Trophy. In his career total of 10 List A matches, he scored 76 runs at a batting average of 19.00, with a high score of 32. In the field he took a single catch. With the ball he took 6 wickets at a bowling average of 51.16, with best figures of 2/30.

== Family ==
His son, Oscar Usher, plays rugby for Newcastle Red Bulls. His grandfather, Charles Peat, played first-class cricket for Oxford University, Middlesex and the Free Foresters. He was also later in his life a Conservative member of parliament for Darlington.
