= Sophia Fry =

British political activist (1837-1897)

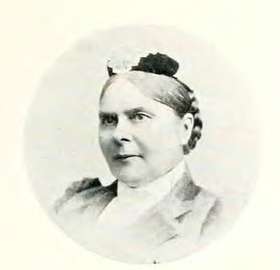
- Born: Sophia Pease; 11 June 1837; Darlington, England
- Died: 30 March 1897 (aged 59); Biarritz, France
- Occupation: Political activist
- Known for: Founding the Women's Liberal Federation
- Spouse(s): Theodore Fry, 1st Baronet
- Children: 8

Sophia Fry later Lady Fry (11 June 1837 – 30 March 1897) was a British political activist, notable for founding the Women's Liberal Federation.

== Life ==
Born in Darlington as Sophia Pease, she was brought up as a Quaker and as an activist in liberal politics. Her parents were John Pease who was a Quaker and a director of the Stockton and Darlington Railway and Sophia Pease who was also a Quaker. She and her sister Mary Anna were educated at home, and for one year at a school in Frenchay, where she met Sarah Sturge and Theodore Fry. She developed an interest in education for the working class, and started running weekly training for pupil-teachers, and ran cookery classes.

Sophia married Fry in 1862, the couple settling in Darlington, and had eight children. Sophia was a founder of the Girls' Friends Day School in Bristol and was active in the North of England College, run by the British and Foreign School Society.

At the 1880 UK general election, Theodore was elected as the Member of Parliament for Darlington and, inspired by this and by William Gladstone's Midlothian Campaign, Sophia formed a Women's Liberal Association in the town in 1881. While there was not yet consensus that women should play a role in politics, Fry was determined that women should campaign for the Liberal Party. She corresponded with members of various women's liberal associations around the country, and in 1886 invited fifteen of them to her house to discuss forming a national federation. This was agreed, and the Women's Liberal Federation (WLF) was established in London in 1887, Fry becoming its honorary secretary. It grew rapidly, and had 75,000 members within five years.

In 1892, the WLF split over whether to support women's suffrage. While Fry was personally in favour, she felt it was a divisive issue and should not become the policy of the group. As a result, when the policy was voted in, she left to become a founder of the rival Women's National Liberal Association, serving as its vice-president.

Theodore was made a baronet in 1894, so Sophia became Lady Fry. In 1896, the couple holidayed in Italy, but she suffered a severe accident, and died in March 1897 in Biarritz.
