= Lola McEvoy =

Parliamentary Private Secretary in the Department for Culture, Media and Sport

Lola McEvoy MP
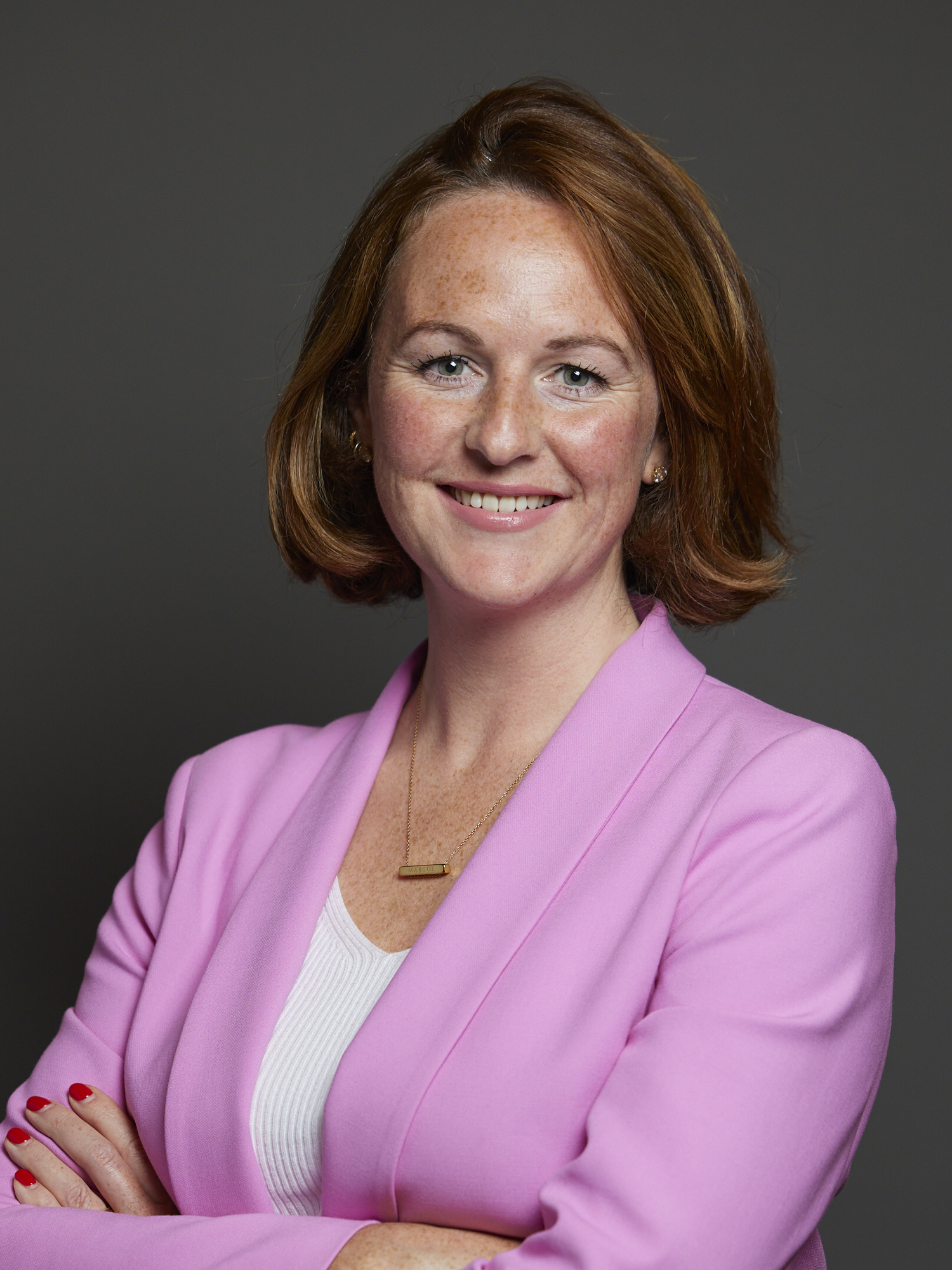
- Official portrait, 2024

Member of Parliament for Darlington
- Incumbent
- Assumed office 4 July 2024
- Preceded by: Peter Gibson
- Majority: 2,298 (5.4%)

Parliamentary Private Secretary in the Department for Culture, Media and Sport
- Incumbent
- Assumed office 15 September 2025
- Prime Minister: Keir Starmer
- Preceded by: Kim Leadbeater

Personal details
- Born: Laura Marie Keough McEvoy; 29 September 1987 (age 39)
- Party: Labour
- Other political affiliations: Labour Growth Group
- Education: Newcastle University

Laura Marie Keough McEvoy (born 29 September 1987) is a British Labour Party politician who has been Member of Parliament for Darlington since 2024.

McEvoy currently serves as co-chair of the Labour Growth Group, chair of the All Party Parliamentary Group on Industrial Strategy and is a parliamentary private secretary to the Secretary of State for Culture, Media and Sport.

== Early life and career ==
McEvoy was born on 29 September 1987. Her father was a palliative care nurse at North Tees hospital and her mother a teacher at Carmel College, Darlington.

McEvoy grew up off North Road in Darlington and attended George Dent nursery, St Augustine’s Primary School and Carmel College. She went on to attend Queen Elizabeth Sixth Form College before completing a Master of Arts (MA) in Multimedia Journalism at Newcastle University.

McEvoy began her career in 2010 working as a parliamentary assistant to Jenny Chapman, the former Member of Parliament for Darlington. She also volunteered on President Barack Obama’s 2012 re-election campaign.

McEvoy’s early career focused on campaigning for fairer wages, workplace justice and better working conditions for workers at organisations such as the Living Wage Foundation and GMB trade union.

During the COVID-19 pandemic, McEvoy secured commitments from several major firms to improve sick pay terms for workers. She also supported efforts to expose the limitations of statutory sick pay and campaigned for equal treatment for outsourced NHS staff, bringing public attention to the difficult choices many low-paid workers faced between health and lost income during the crisis.

== Political career ==
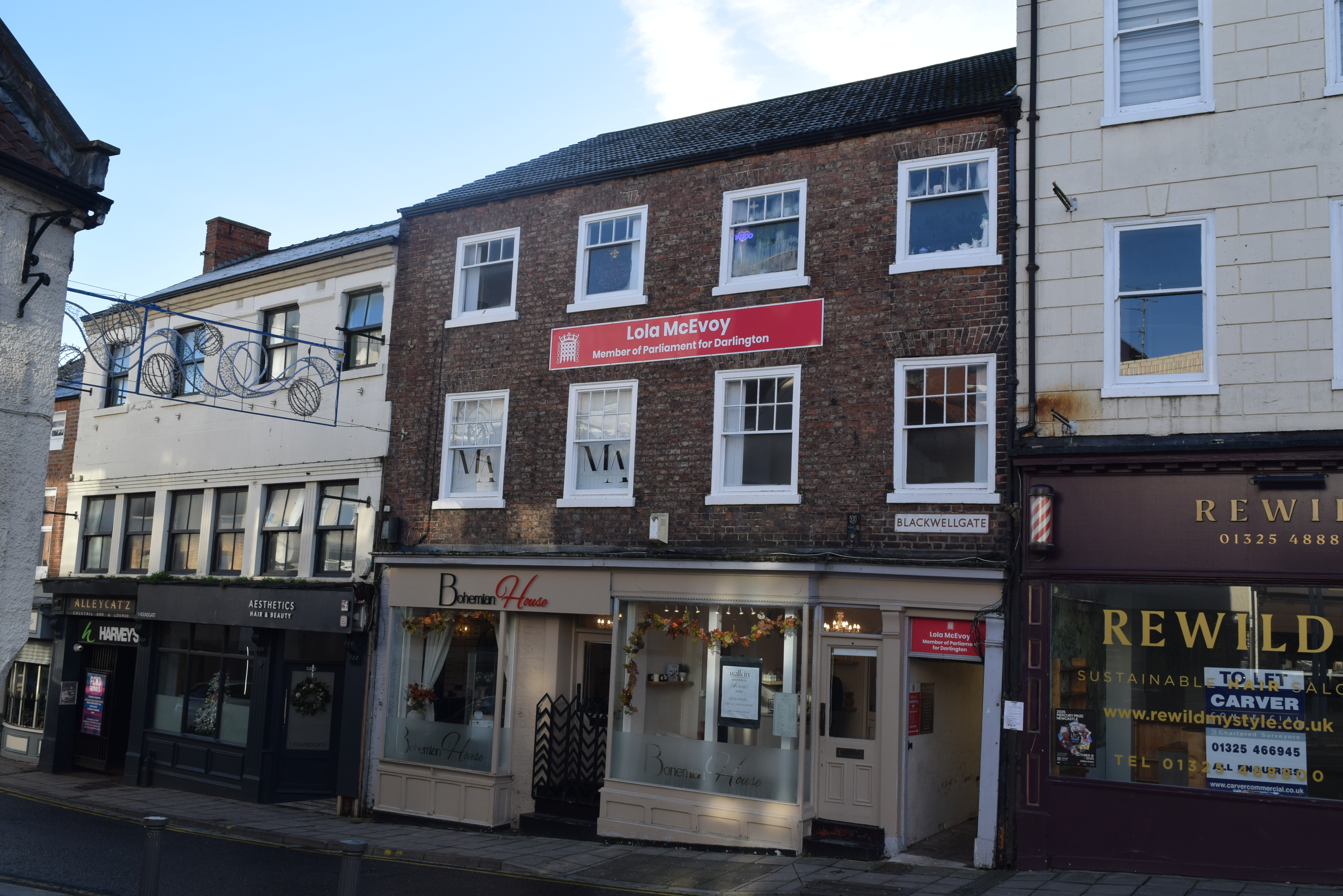
Constituency office in Darlington

At the 2017 general election, McEvoy stood as the Labour candidate for Penrith and The Border, finishing second behind Rory Stewart with 26.2% of the vote. She achieved a swing of 11.8%.

Ahead of the 2024 general election, McEvoy was selected as the prospective Labour candidate for Darlington. She was elected as MP with 39.2% of the vote and a majority of 2,298.

Since entering Parliament, McEvoy has worked in roles linked to economic growth and regional development. She currently serves as Co-Chair of the Labour Growth Group and as Chair of the All-Party Parliamentary Group (APPG) on Industrial Strategy, where she has advocated for a long-term, place-based approach to British industry and manufacturing.

From June 2024 to September 2025, she was a member of the Treasury Select Committee.

McEvoy has campaigned on issues affecting workers and communities in the North East England. She has been active on renters’ rights, supporting reforms to strengthen protections for tenants and securing an amendment during parliamentary consideration of housing legislation.

McEvoy has been a campaigner on online safety, particularly for children and young people. She established a Darlington online safety forum, bringing together schools, parents and experts, and arranged for students from Darlington to meet with the Secretary of State for Science, Innovation and Technology as well as representatives from Ofcom, enabling young people to raise their concerns directly with policymakers and regulators.

Locally, McEvoy has campaigned for donations to the Golden Tickets Campaign, helping to ensure that every child in Darlington can access a free ticket to Hopetown Darlington, the town’s rail heritage attraction. She has also lobbied the Government to retain the Towns Fund, arguing that it should be refocused as a community-led programme shaped by local priorities rather than centrally directed projects.

In the 2025–26 budget, McEvoy secured £16 million from the Government’s Growth Mission Fund to support the development of a new STEM Centre at Darlington Science Park, backing the project as a driver of skills, innovation and high-quality employment in the region.

McEvoy worked with Historic England to establish a blue plaque scheme for Darlington to celebrate the town’s history and notable figures. Following recommendations from the campaign panel, the plaques were ultimately designated green plaques, which were launched in December 2025.

She has also spoken publicly about anti-social behaviour, calling for a ban on the wearing of balaclava in public in response to what she described as an escalation in youth-related disorder in town centres.

On 15 September 2025, McEvoy was appointed as the parliamentary private secretary for the Department for Culture, Media and Sport.

Parliament of the United Kingdom
Preceded by Peter Gibson	Member of Parliament for Darlington; 2024–present	Incumbent
