= Labour Growth Group =

Faction of the UK Labour Party

Wordmark

The Labour Growth Group is a parliamentary caucus of MPs within the UK Labour Party that aims to remove barriers to economic growth.

The group's website says, "We believe that many of the barriers to unleashing a new era of growth in the United Kingdom are political and we exist to confront those barriers."

== Organisation ==
The group began with a letter sent to Keir Starmer, urging him to not back down on reforming planning laws and to pursue building housing and infrastructure. They advocate for improving the economic growth of the UK. There were over 50 signatories. The letter got the approval of the government before it was published.

- Zubir Ahmed, Glasgow South West
- Dan Aldridge, Weston-super-Mare
- Tonia Antoniazzi, Gower
- David Baines, St Helens North
- Alex Baker, Aldershot
- Antonia Bance, Tipton and Wednesbury
- Alex Barros-Curtis, Cardiff West
- Johanna Baxter, Paisley and Renfrewshire South
- Danny Beales, Uxbridge and South Ruislip
- Torsten Bell, Swansea West
- Rachel Blake, Cities of London and Westminster
- Liam Byrne, Birmingham Hodge Hill and Solihull North
- Nesil Caliskan, Barking
- Bambos Charalambous, Southgate and Wood Green
- Luke Charters, York Outer
- Chris Curtis, Milton Keynes North
- Shaun Davies, Telford
- Helena Dollimore, Hastings and Rye
- Kirith Entwistle, Bolton North East
- Bill Esterson, Sefton Central
- Mark Ferguson, Gateshead Central and Whickham
- John Grady, Glasgow East
- Tom Hayes, Bournemouth East
- Claire Hazelgrove, Filton and Bradley Stoke
- Patrick Hurley, Southport
- Sally Jameson, Doncaster Central
- Satvir Kaur, Southampton Test
- Josh MacAlister, Whitehaven and Workington
- Blair McDougall, East Renfrewshire
- Gordon McKee, Glasgow South
- Julie Minns, Carlisle
- Perran Moon, Camborne and Redruth
- Luke Myer, Middlesbrough South and East Cleveland
- Kanishka Narayan, Vale of Glamorgan
- Andrew Pakes, Peterborough
- Toby Perkins, Chesterfield
- Jo Platt, Leigh and Atherton
- Joe Powell, Kensington and Bayswater
- Steve Race, Exeter
- Connor Rand, Altrincham and Sale West
- Jake Richards, Rother Valley
- Lucy Rigby, Northampton North
- Tom Rutland, East Worthing and Shoreham
- Oliver Ryan, Burnley
- Josh Simons, Makerfield
- Gurinder Singh Josan, Smethwick
- Mike Tapp, Dover and Deal
- Fred Thomas, Plymouth Moor View
- Dan Tomlinson, Chipping Barnet
- Henry Tufnell, Mid and South Pembrokeshire
- Laurence Turner, Birmingham Northfield
- Melanie Ward, Cowdenbeath and Kirkcaldy
- Rosie Wrighting, Kettering
- Steve Yemm, Mansfield

The group has been reported as being 'pro-Starmer'.

PoliticsHome reported that Labour MPs from the left of the party were sceptical of the group, with one believing it is a 'front' set up by the government to support its work.

== Membership ==
The membership has been reported as the signatories of the letter to Starmer. The group includes some Parliamentary Private Secretaries (PPS). The original letter had 54 signatories, but the Spectator reported as of the end of July 2024, there were over 60 members, while the Times reported the figure was 'close to 70'. In December 2024, the New Statesman reported the group was at 'nearly 100' members.

In July 2025, analysis by LabourList and PLMR suggested that the group had 55 publicly-known members.

The current Co-Chairs are Chris Curtis and Lola McEvoy. The director is Mark McVitie, who also works for Curtis's MP office.
