= Edward Fletcher (politician) =

British politician (1911–1983)

Edward Joseph Fletcher (25 February 1911 – 13 February 1983) was a British Labour Party politician.

== Early life ==
Fletcher was educated at Fircroft College, Birmingham, and was a trade union official. He served as a councillor on Newcastle City Council from 1952, and chaired the North-Eastern Association for the Arts.

== Parliamentary career ==
Fletcher unsuccessfully contested Middlesbrough West for the Labour Party at the 1959 general election. At the 1964 general election he was elected as Member of Parliament (MP) for Darlington, and held the seat until his death in 1983, aged 71. He was a member of the Tribune Group and was regarded as being broadly on the left of the Labour Party.

Fletcher's Labour successor after the resulting by-election was Ossie O'Brien, who was MP for just a matter of weeks before he lost to the Conservative Michael Fallon at the 1983 general election.

== Legacy ==
Ted Fletcher Court remains in the Haughton area of Darlington, as a memorial to Fletcher.

Parliament of the United Kingdom
Preceded by Anthony Bourne-Arton	Member of Parliament for Darlington; 1964–1983	Succeeded by Ossie O'Brien
