= William Edwin Pease =

William Edwin Pease (3 June 1865 – 23 January 1926) was an English businessman and Conservative Party politician from County Durham. Pease was educated at Clifton College and Trinity College, Cambridge.

He was born into the wealthy Pease family of Darlington, Quakers who had prospered through a variety of enterprises including railways, coal mines, woolen manufacturing and a family bank which collapsed in 1902. His father Edwin Lucas Pease (died 1899) was the grandson of Joseph Pease (1772–1846), an abolitionist and founder of the Peace Society. He became Chairman of the Cleveland Bridge & Engineering Company some times after his father's death in 1889, and was also a director of the Consett Iron Works.

He was elected as member of parliament (MP) for Darlington at a by-election in February 1923. He replaced his cousin Herbert Pike Pease, who had been ennobled as Baron Daryngton (and who had been elected to succeed his father Arthur). William Pease held the seat until his death in 1926.

Parliament of the United Kingdom
Preceded by Herbert Pike Pease	Member of Parliament for Darlington; 1923–1926	Succeeded by Arthur Lewis Shepherd
