= Michael Fallon =

British politician (born 1952)

The Right Honourable Sir Michael Fallon KCB
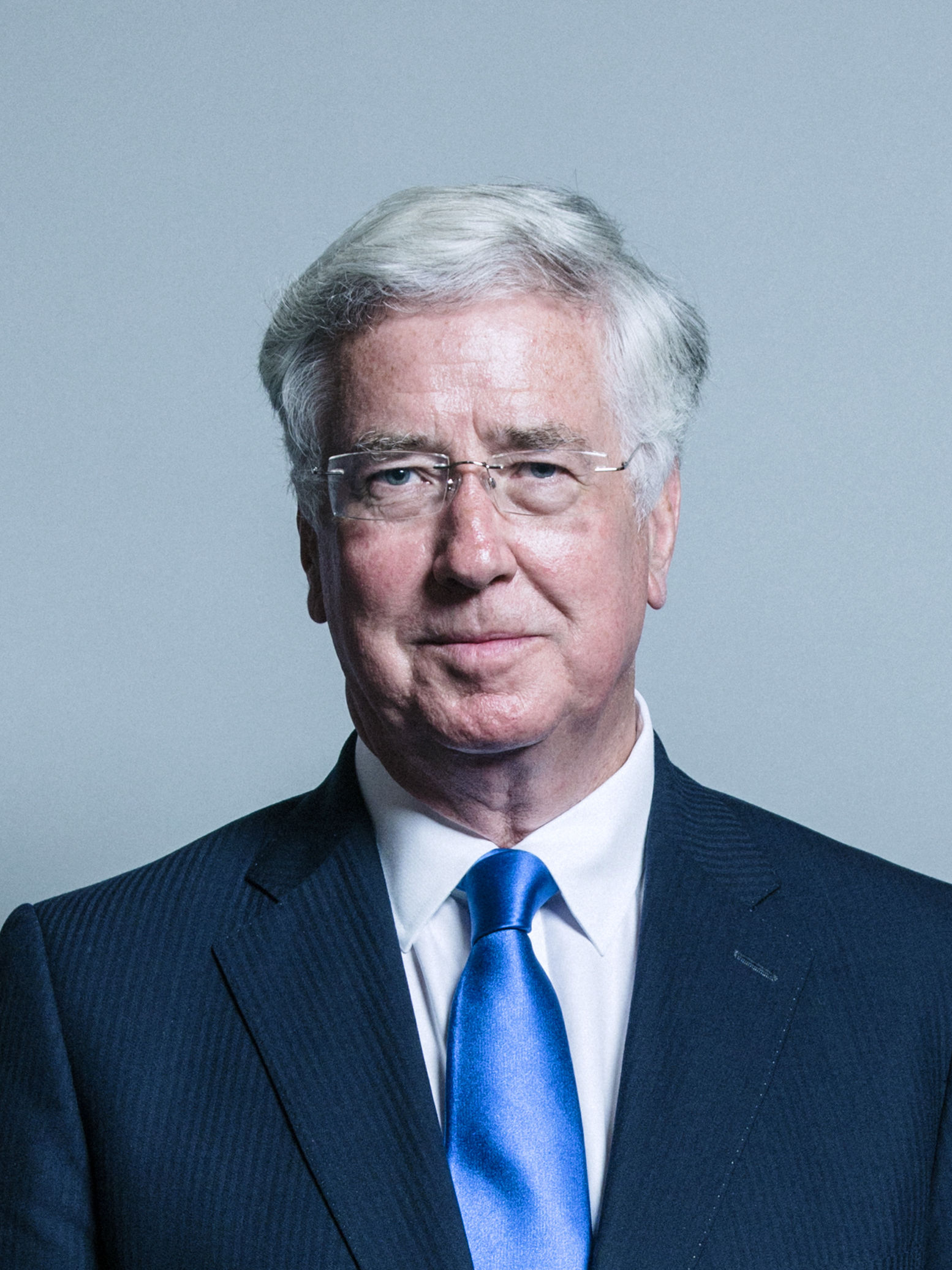
- Official portrait, 2017

Secretary of State for Defence
- In office 15 July 2014 – 1 November 2017
- Prime Minister: David Cameron; Theresa May
- Preceded by: Philip Hammond
- Succeeded by: Gavin Williamson

Minister for Portsmouth
- In office 16 January 2014 – 15 July 2014
- Prime Minister: David Cameron
- Preceded by: Office established
- Succeeded by: Matt Hancock

Minister of State for Energy
- In office 28 March 2013 – 15 July 2014
- Prime Minister: David Cameron
- Preceded by: John Hayes
- Succeeded by: Matt Hancock

Minister of State for Business and Enterprise
- In office 4 September 2012 – 15 July 2014
- Prime Minister: David Cameron
- Preceded by: Mark Prisk
- Succeeded by: Matt Hancock

Deputy Chairman of the Conservative Party
- In office 4 September 2010 – 4 September 2012
- Leader: David Cameron
- Preceded by: The Lord Ashcroft
- Succeeded by: Sarah Newton

Parliamentary Under-Secretary of State for Education
- In office 24 July 1990 – 14 April 1992
- Prime Minister: Margaret Thatcher; John Major
- Preceded by: Robert Jackson
- Succeeded by: Eric Forth

Lord Commissioner of the Treasury
- In office 10 May 1990 – 22 July 1990
- Prime Minister: Margaret Thatcher
- Preceded by: Stephen Dorrell
- Succeeded by: Greg Knight
Parliamentary offices
Member of Parliament for Sevenoaks
In office 1 May 1997 – 6 November 2019
Preceded by	Mark Wolfson
Succeeded by	Laura Trott
Member of Parliament for Darlington
In office 9 June 1983 – 16 March 1992
Preceded by	Ossie O'Brien
Succeeded by	Alan Milburn

Personal details
- Born: Michael Cathel Fallon; 14 May 1952 (age 74) Perth, Perthshire, Scotland
- Spouse: Wendy Elisabeth Payne (m. 1986)
- Children: 2
- Education: Epsom College
- Alma mater: University of St Andrews

Sir Michael Cathel Fallon KCB (born 14 May 1952) is a British politician who served as Secretary of State for Defence from 2014 to 2017. A member of the Conservative Party, he served as Member of Parliament (MP) for Sevenoaks from 1997 to 2019, having previously served as MP for Darlington from 1983 to 1992.

Fallon attended the independent Epsom College and read Classics and Ancient History at the University of St Andrews. After university he joined the Conservative Research Department. Elected for Darlington at the 1983 general election, he was appointed Parliamentary Under-Secretary of State at the Department for Education and Science in 1990. He lost his seat as MP for Darlington at the 1992 general election.

Fallon re-entered Parliament at the 1997 general election as MP for Sevenoaks. He served as Deputy Chairman of the Conservative Party from 2010 to 2012, Minister of State for Business and Enterprise from 2012 to 2014, Minister of State at the Department of Energy and Climate Change from 2013 to 2014 and Minister for Portsmouth in 2014. In the 2014 cabinet reshuffle he was promoted to Secretary of State for Defence. He resigned from the post after being implicated in the 2017 Westminster sexual misconduct allegations.

== Early life and career ==
Michael Cathel Fallon was born in Perth, Perthshire, Scotland. His father was an Irish-born surgeon, Dr Martin Fallon, who was educated in Dublin and became a high-ranking medical officer in the British Army. Dr Fallon received the OBE for services to the wounded including at Arnhem. Michael Fallon was educated at Craigflower Preparatory School near Dunfermline and at Epsom College, a private boys' school in Surrey. He then read Classics and Ancient History at the University of St Andrews, graduating in 1974 with a Master of Arts (MA Hons) degree.

As a student, Fallon was active in the European Movement and the "Yes" youth campaign in the 1975 referendum. After university he joined the Conservative Research Department, working first for Lord Carrington in the House of Lords until 1977 and then as European desk officer until 1979. He became research assistant to Baroness Elles in 1979, around the time that she became an MEP.

== Parliamentary career ==
He was selected as the Conservative parliamentary candidate for Darlington in July 1982, and fought the Darlington by-election on 24 March 1983, which was held after the Labour MP Ted Fletcher had died. Although Fallon lost to Labour's Ossie O'Brien by 2,412 votes, he defeated O'Brien 77 days later by 3,438 votes in the 1983 general election.

Fallon was appointed as the Parliamentary Private Secretary to the Secretary of State for Energy Cecil Parkinson following the 1987 general election, and in 1988 joined the government of Margaret Thatcher as an Assistant Whip, becoming a Lord Commissioner to the Treasury in 1990. Fallon, alongside Michael Portillo and Michael Forsyth, visited Thatcher on the eve of her resignation in a last-ditch and ultimately unsuccessful attempt to persuade her to reconsider her decision.

=== Junior minister in the Department for Education and Science ===
Thatcher appointed Fallon Parliamentary Under Secretary of State for the Department for Education and Science in July 1990, a position he continued to hold under the new premiership of John Major. In this office Fallon headed legislation that led to the local management of schools, which among other changes gave schools a greater degree of financial independence, including control of their own bank accounts and cheque books. He remained in that office until the 1992 general election, when he lost his seat at Darlington to Labour's Alan Milburn by a margin of 2,798 votes.

=== Return to the House of Commons ===
Fallon was selected to stand in the safe Conservative seat of Sevenoaks, after the sitting member, Mark Wolfson, decided not to stand again at the 1997 general election. At that election he held Sevenoaks with a substantially reduced majority.

Soon after his return to parliament, Fallon was appointed by William Hague as Opposition Spokesman for Trade and Industry and then as Shadow Financial Secretary to the Treasury, but in October 1998 he resigned from the front bench, owing to ill health, remaining on the backbenches until Hague appointed him as Deputy Chairman of the Conservative Party.

From 1999 he was a member of the Treasury Select Committee and chairman of its Sub-Committee (2001–10). He also served on the executive committee of the 1922 Committee between 2005 and 2007.

In September 2012, David Cameron appointed Fallon as Minister for Business and Enterprise and he also became a Privy Councillor.

Fallon has been a director at Tullett Prebon, a leading brokerage firm in the City of London, and was one of the biggest supporters of the privatisation of the Royal Mail.

In January 2014, Fallon was appointed as Minister for Portsmouth. Six months later, on 15 July 2014, Cameron promoted him to the Cabinet, as Secretary of State for Defence.

=== Secretary of State for Defence (2014–2017) ===
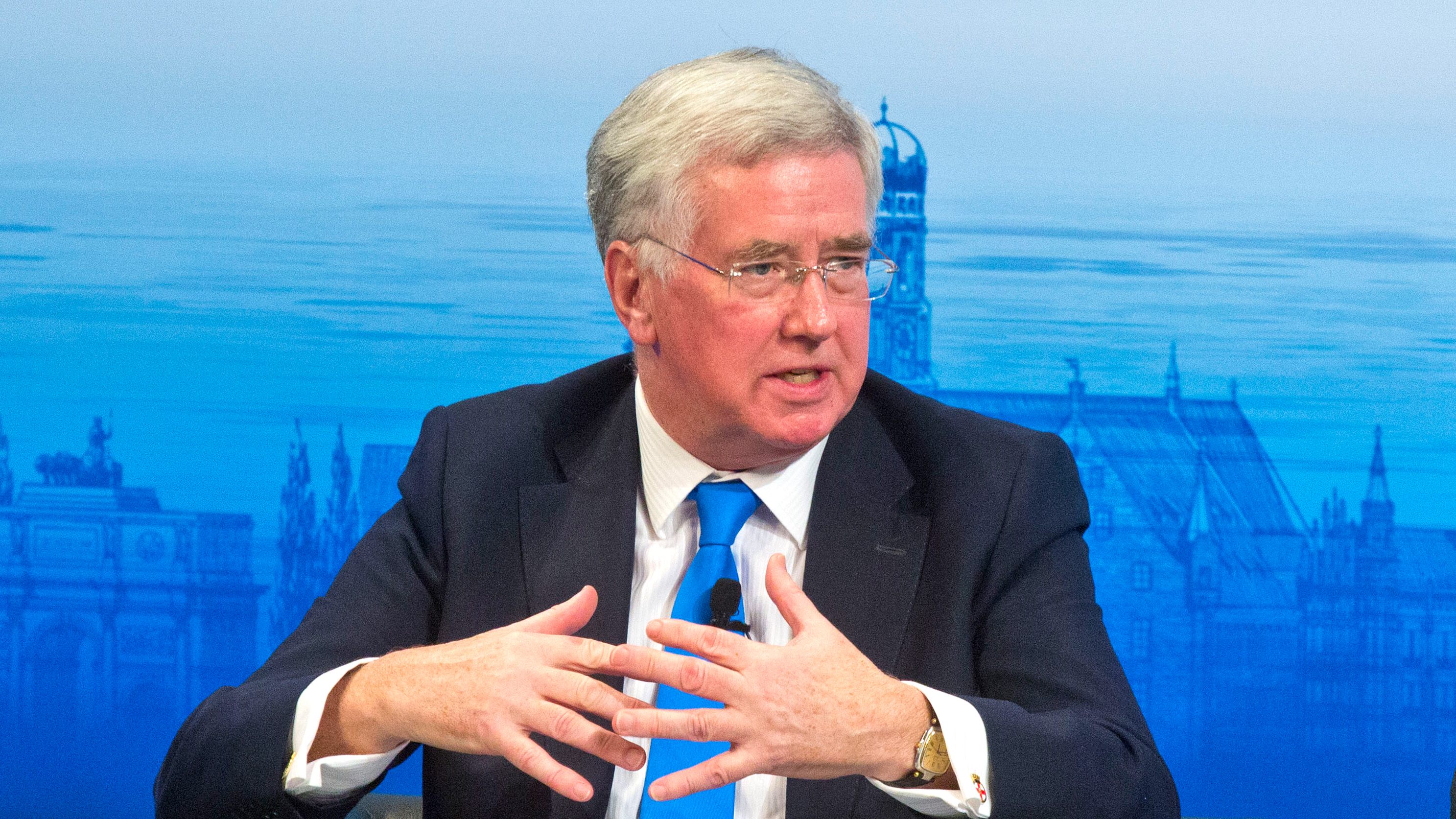
Fallon during the Munich Security Conference in 2016

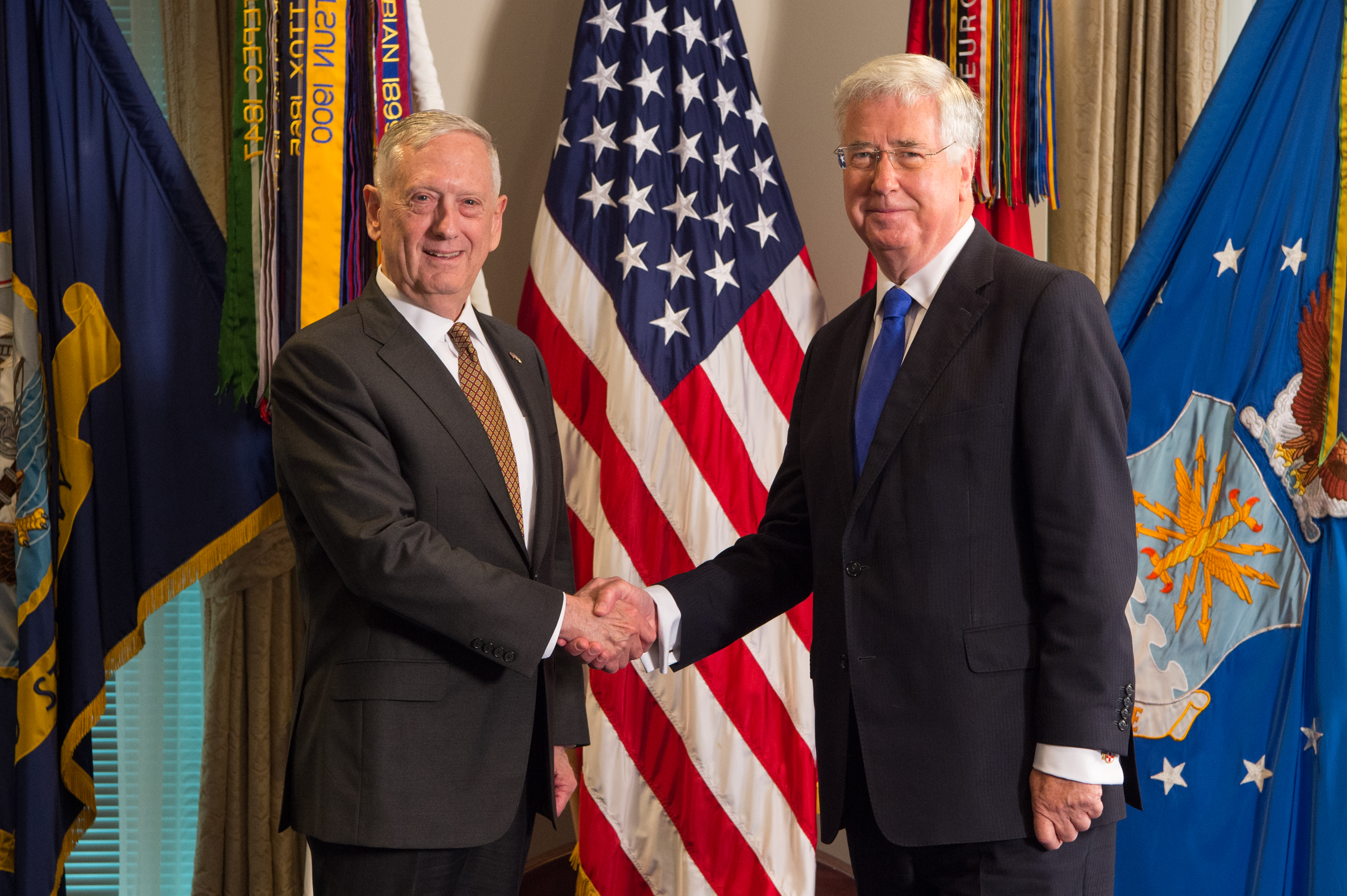
Fallon with US Secretary of Defence James Mattis, July 2017

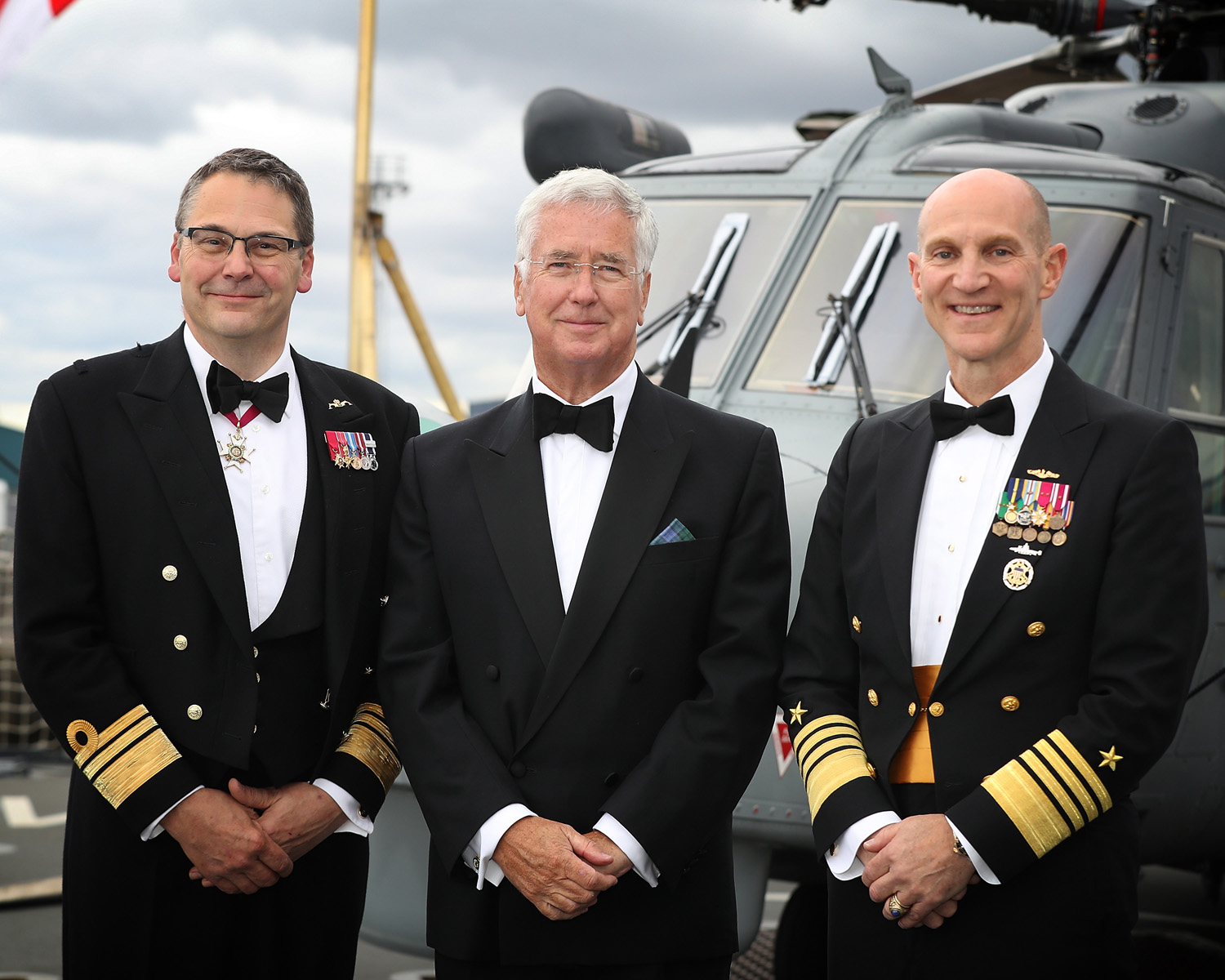
Fallon (centre) with Vice-Admiral Sir Simon Lister (left) and Admiral James F. Caldwell Jr. in August 2017

In February 2016, the week after a leaked United Nations report had found the Saudi-led coalition guilty of conducting "widespread and systematic" air strikes against civilians in Yemen – including camps for internally displaced people, weddings, schools, hospitals, religious centers, vehicles and markets – and the same day the International Development Select Committee had said that the UK should end all arms exports to Saudi Arabia because of ongoing, large-scale human rights violations by the Kingdom's armed forces in Yemen, Fallon was criticised for attending a £450-a-head dinner for an arms-industry trade-body.

In December 2016, Fallon admitted that UK-supplied internationally banned cluster munitions had been used in Saudi Arabia's bombing campaign in Yemen.

In April 2017, Fallon confirmed that the UK would use its nuclear weapons in a "pre-emptive initial strike" in "the most extreme circumstances" on BBC Radio's Today programme.

In 2017, Fallon warned that Russia's Zapad 2017 exercise in Belarus and Russia's Kaliningrad Oblast was "designed to provoke us". Fallon falsely claimed that number of Russian troops taking part in exercise could reach 100,000.

==== European Union ====
In an interview in The Daily Telegraph in 2016, before the European Union (EU) membership referendum, Fallon described himself as Eurosceptic and critical of many aspects of the EU, but said that he wanted Britain to remain in the EU, in the face of multiple threats from Russia's president Vladimir Putin, crime, and international terrorism.

==== Run-up to the 2015 general election ====
During the run-up to the 2015 general election, Fallon wrote an article in The Times saying that Ed Miliband had stabbed his brother David Miliband in the back to become Labour leader and he would also stab Britain in the back to become prime minister. Fallon subsequently declined the opportunity to describe Miliband as a decent person and his comments embarrassed some Conservative supporters. Miliband gave a response, saying that Fallon had fallen below his usual standards and demeaned himself, which the New Statesman asserted was dignified, contrasting with Fallon's counter-productive personal attack.

==== Expenses scandal ====
According to The Daily Telegraph Fallon, Deputy Chairman of the Treasury Select Committee, claimed for mortgage repayments on his Westminster flat in their entirety. MPs are only allowed to claim for interest charges.

Between 2002 and 2004, Fallon regularly claimed £1,255 per month in capital repayments and interest, rather than the £700–£800 for the interest component alone. After his error was noticed by staff at the Commons Fees Office in September 2004, he asked: "Why has no one brought this to my attention before?" He repaid £2,200 of this over-claim, but was allowed to offset the remaining £6,100 against his allowance. After realising they had failed to notice the excessive claims, Commons staff reportedly suggested Fallon submit fresh claims which would "reassign" the surplus payments to other costs he had legitimately incurred.

==== Allegations of sexual harassment, inappropriate behaviour and resignation ====
In late October 2017 it was reported that Fallon had repeatedly and inappropriately touched journalist Julia Hartley-Brewer's knee during a dinner in 2002. Hartley-Brewer recalled that after Fallon kept putting his hand on her knee, she "calmly and politely explained to him, that if he did it again, I would punch him in the face". Fallon resigned two days later believing his "previous conduct" towards women had "fallen below" what is acceptable. Hartley-Brewer expressed shock at the resignation, saying: "I didn't feel it was something that needed any further dealing with".

It was subsequently reported Fallon had been forced to resign in part due to an allegation of inappropriate and lewd comments towards fellow Conservative MP Andrea Leadsom when they both sat on the Treasury Select Committee. He was also accused of making comments of a sexual nature about other MPs on the committee and members of the public who attended hearings. The former political editor of The Independent on Sunday, Jane Merrick, said in The Observer in early November 2017 that Fallon was the previously unnamed Conservative MP who had "lunged" at her a decade and a half earlier. She had contacted Downing Street about the incident several hours before he resigned. The Observer reported on the same day that "the revelation was the tipping point for No 10, which ... had been compiling a list of alleged incidents involving Fallon since claims against him were first made."

In September 2019, Fallon announced he would not seek re-election at the 2019 United Kingdom general election.

== Career outside Parliament ==
Between 1992 and 1997, Fallon set up a chain of children's nurseries called Just Learning with funding from the British Dragons' Den member Duncan Bannatyne, becoming chief executive.

== Personal life ==
Fallon has been married to Wendy Elisabeth Payne, a HR professional, since 27 September 1986; the couple have two sons. The family lives in Sundridge, Kent.

He was banned from driving for 18 months in 1983 after admitting a drink-driving offence during the general election campaign.

Fallon was made a Knight Commander of the Order of the Bath (KCB) for political and public service as part of the Resignation Honours of the outgoing prime minister David Cameron.

== Publications ==
- The Quango Explosion: Public Bodies and Ministerial Patronage by Philip Holland and Michael Fallon, 1978, Conservative Political Centre, ISBN 0-85070-621-1
- Sovereign Members by Michael Fallon, 1982
- The Rise of the Euroquango by Michael Fallon, 1982, Adam Smith Institute, ISBN 0-906517-22-2
- Brighter Schools: Attracting Private Investment into State Schools by Michael Fallon, 1993, Social Market Foundation, ISBN 1-874097-15-1

Parliament of the United Kingdom
Preceded by Ossie O'Brien	Member of Parliament for Darlington; 1983–1992	Succeeded by Alan Milburn
Preceded by Mark Wolfson	Member of Parliament for Sevenoaks; 1997–2019	Succeeded by Laura Trott
Political offices
Preceded by Robert Jackson	Parliamentary Under-Secretary of State for Education; 1990–1992	Succeeded by Eric Forth
Preceded by Mark Prisk	Minister of State for Business and Enterprise; 2012–2014	Succeeded by Matt Hancock
Preceded by John Hayes	Minister of State for Energy; 2013–2014	Succeeded by Matt Hancock
New office	Minister for Portsmouth; 2014	Succeeded by Matt Hancock
Preceded by Philip Hammond	Secretary of State for Defence; 2014–2017	Succeeded by Gavin Williamson
Party political offices
Preceded by The Lord Ashcroft	Deputy Chairman of the Conservative Party; 2010–2012	Succeeded by Sarah Newton
