= Arthur Shepherd (politician) =

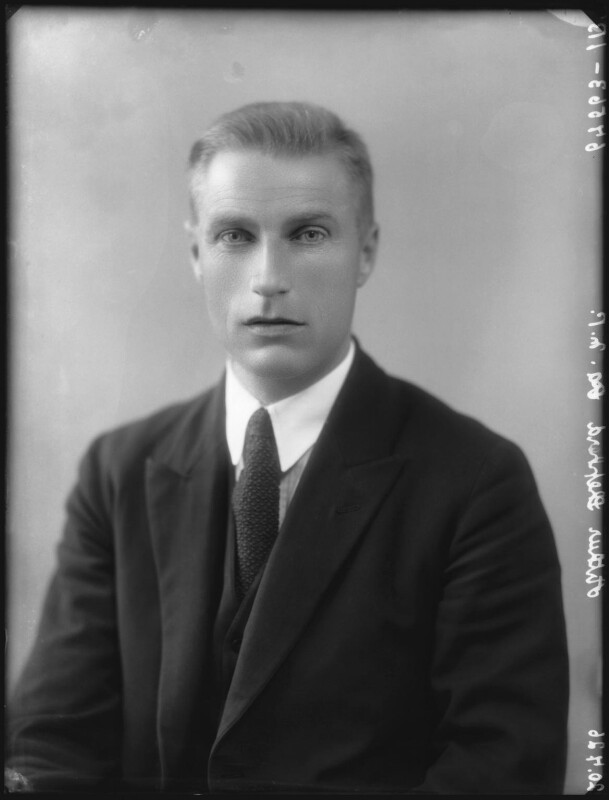
Shepherd in 1926

Arthur Lewis Shepherd (7 February 1884 – 14 April 1951) was a Labour Party politician in the United Kingdom.

He was elected as the member of parliament (MP) for Darlington at a by-election in 1926, having unsuccessfully contested the seat at the 1924 general election. He was re-elected in 1929, but when Labour split at the 1931 general election as Ramsay MacDonald led the breakaway National Labour group into a Conservative-dominated National Government, he lost his seat to the Conservative candidate Charles Peat. He stood again in 1935, but lost again by a margin of over 10% of the votes.

Parliament of the United Kingdom
Preceded by William Pease	Member of Parliament for Darlington; 1926–1931	Succeeded by Charles Peat
