= David Hardman =

British politician (1901–1989)

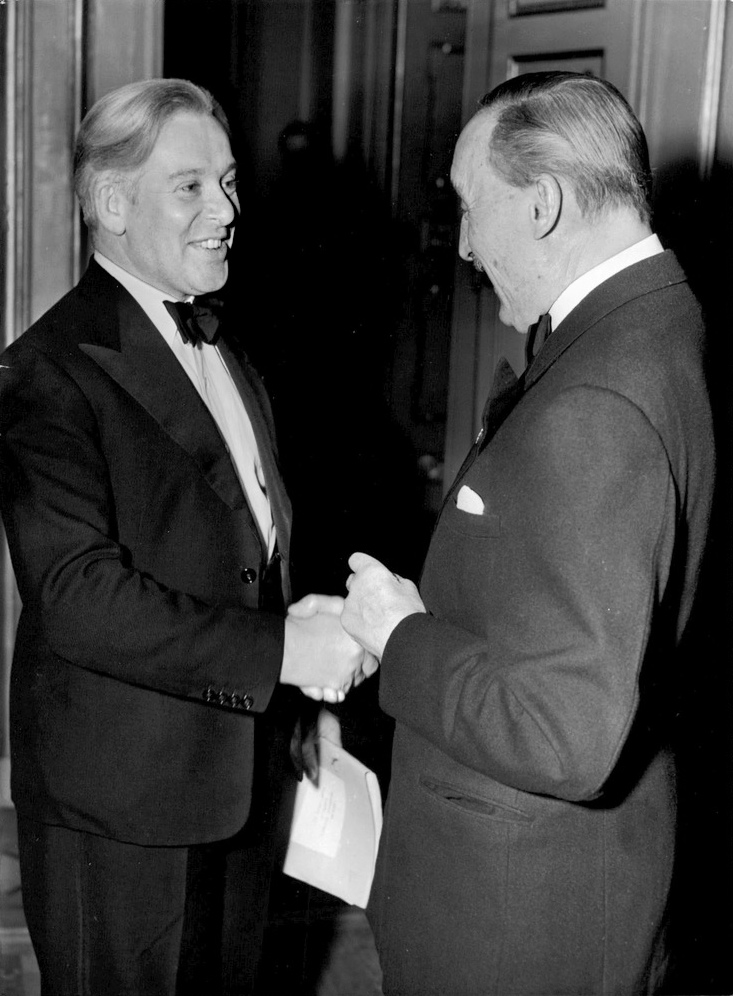
David Hardman (left) is welcomed by general Hugo Cederschiöld during a visit to Sweden in 1951.

David Rennie Hardman (18 October 1901 – 6 December 1989) was a British Labour Party politician, author and Shakespearean scholar. His book What About Shakespeare? was published in 1938. In 1964 Hardman published Telscombe: A Village in Sussex with a preface by The Right Honourable The Lord Shawcross. When he became President of The Holiday Fellowship David Hardman published The History of the Holiday Fellowship in 1981.

== Early life and education ==
Although he was born in London, David Hardman moved to Coleraine in Ireland with his parents when he was very young because his father (also David Hardman) was made head of Coleraine Technical Academy. He grew up in Coleraine with his siblings Grace, Alice and Patrick.

David Hardman's education was interrupted by the First World War and it is understood he was called up when he was 17 on or after 18 October 1918.

David deferred his place at Christ's College, Cambridge because of his military service, but, once at Cambridge he became the first Socialist President of the Cambridge Union in 1924. His parents had been members of the Fabian Society and he was an active socialist.

== Political career ==
He unsuccessfully contested Cambridge at the 1929 general election. At the 1945 general election, he was elected as Member of Parliament (MP) for Darlington, defeating the sitting Conservative MP Charles Peat.

Hardman held the seat until the 1951 general election, when he was defeated by the Conservative Fergus Graham. In the Clement Attlee's post-war Labour government, he was Parliamentary Secretary to the Minister of Education.

== Death ==
He died on 6 December 1989 in Brighton, Sussex, England.

Parliament of the United Kingdom
Preceded by Charles Peat	Member of Parliament for Darlington; 1945–1951	Succeeded by Fergus Graham
