= Theodore Fry =

English politician (1836-1912)

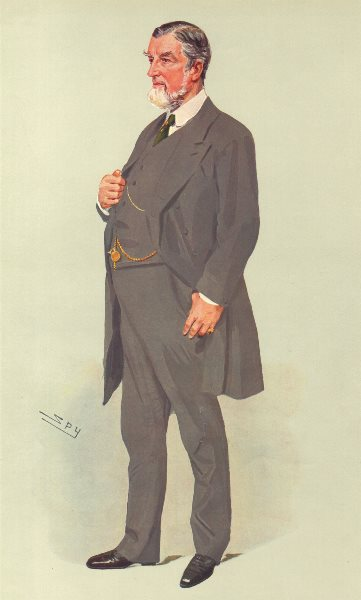
- "Not a Small Fry", caricature by Spy in Vanity Fair, 1909

Member of Parliament (MP) for Darlington
- In office 1880–1895
- Preceded by: Edmund Backhouse
- Succeeded by: Arthur Pease

Personal details
- Born: 1 May 1836 Bristol, England
- Died: 5 February 1912 (aged 75) Beechhanger Court, Caterham, Surrey, England
- Party: Liberal
- Spouse(s): Sophia Pease (m. 1862; died 1897) Florence Bates (m. 1902)
- Parents: Francis Fry (father); Matilda Penrose (mother)

Sir Theodore Fry, 1st Baronet (1 May 1836 – 5 February 1912) was an English businessman and Liberal Party politician who sat in the House of Commons from 1880 to 1895.

== Life ==
He was the son of Francis Fry, of Bristol, and his wife Matilda Penrose, daughter of Daniel Penrose and was educated at Bristol. Fry was active in business in the North East, as director of the Bearpark Coal and Coke Co; director of Shildon and Weardale Waterworks, and head of Fry Janson and Co, iron manufacturers of Darlington. He was mayor of Darlington 1877–1878.

At the 1880 general election Fry was elected member of parliament (MP) for Darlington, and held the seat until the 1895 general election. He was made a baronet, of Woodburn in the parish of Blackwell in the County of Durham, in 1894.

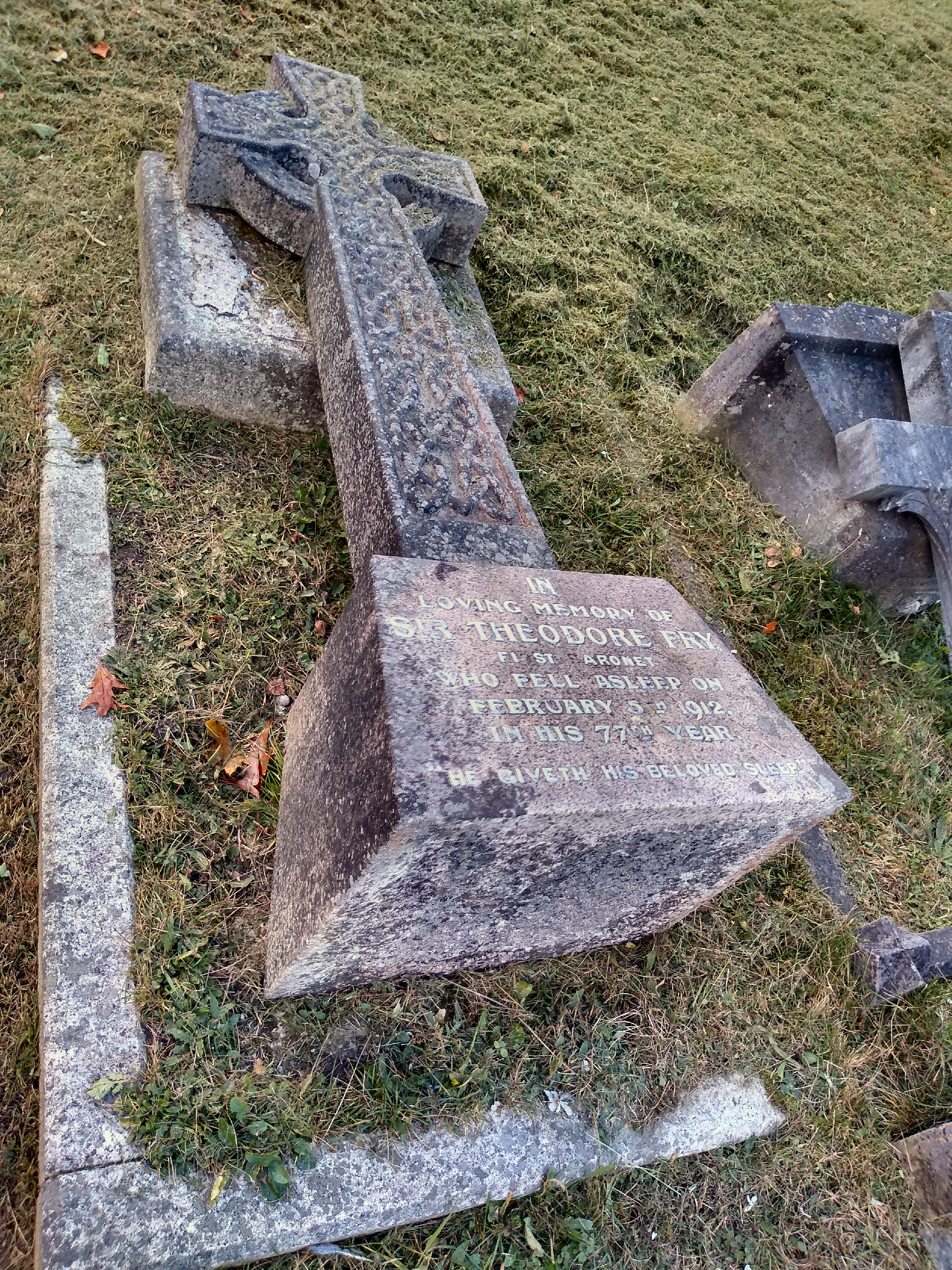
Caterham Cemetery

Fry died at the age of 75 at his residence, Beechhanger Court, Caterham.

== Family ==
Fry married Sophia Pease (1837–1897), a philanthropist and political activist and granddaughter of the railway pioneer Edward Pease. After her death, he married Florence Bates in 1902.

Parliament of the United Kingdom
Preceded by Edmund Backhouse	Member of Parliament for Darlington; 1880–1895	Succeeded by Arthur Pease
Baronetage of the United Kingdom
New creation	Baronet (of Woodburn); 1894–1912	Succeeded by John Pease Fry
