= Ossie O'Brien =

British politician

Oswald O'Brien

Member of Parliament for Darlington
- In office 24 March 1983 – 13 May 1983
- Preceded by: Edward Fletcher
- Succeeded by: Michael Fallon

Personal details
- Born: 6 April 1928 Darlington, County Durham, England
- Died: 6 March 1997 (aged 68)
- Party: Labour
- Education: St Cuthbert's Society, Durham

Oswald O'Brien (6 April 1928 – 6 March 1997) was a British politician who served as Member of Parliament (MP) for Darlington from a 1983 by-election until the general election later the same year. A member of the Labour Party, he was one of the shortest serving Members of Parliament of modern times, serving just seven weeks and one day.

== Early life ==
He was born Oswald O'Brien into the Darlington family of a disabled First World War soldier and mill worker mother in 1928. From St Mary's Catholic Grammar School he went to Fircroft College, Birmingham and St Cuthbert's Society in the University of Durham, during which he served as President of the Durham Union, after World War II service in the Royal Navy which he volunteered for lying about his age by one year (aged 14) to relieve economic pressure on his family.

== Political career ==
O'Brien was committed to the causes of nuclear disarmament, equality and liberation politics. He was a teacher at Durham University, Director of Studies of the Co-operative College, Workplace Director of Alcohol Concern, member of Commission of Industrial Relations, Workers' Educational Association, and European and International Consultant on workers rights, economics and security.

Following the death of Edward Fletcher, the sitting member, O'Brien was elected as Member of Parliament for Darlington in the March 1983 by-election, holding the marginal Labour seat with a majority of 2,412. In the general election held less than two months later, he lost the seat by a margin of 3,438 votes to the Conservative candidate Michael Fallon, who had been his rival in the by-election. He never returned to Parliament.

== See also ==
- List of United Kingdom MPs with the shortest service

Parliament of the United Kingdom
Preceded by Edward Fletcher	Member of Parliament for Darlington; March 1983–June 1983	Succeeded by Michael Fallon
