= Will Sherwood =

William John Sherwood (1871 – 14 March 1955) was a British trade unionist and politician.

Born in Hartlepool, Sherwood left school at the age of twelve. He joined the National Union of General Workers and began working full-time for the union in 1900, later becoming its President. He also became active in the Labour Party, and was elected to Hartlepool Town Council. He stood unsuccessfully for the party in The Hartlepools at the 1918 general election, then in Darlington at the 1922 general election, 1923 by-election and 1923 general election.

In 1925, Sherwood was elected as President of the Federation of Engineering and Shipbuilding Trades, holding the post until 1933. In 1924, the National Union of General Workers became part of the National Union of General and Municipal Workers, and Sherwood became its National Industrial Officer. He also served on the General Council of the Trades Union Congress for many years, and was its representative to the American Federation of Labour in 1927. He retired in 1937. In 1938, His Majesty King George VI conferred on him the CBE medal in the New Years Honours List.

Trade union offices
Preceded by John Bromley and George Hicks	Trades Union Congress representative to the American Federation of Labour; 1927; With: Arthur Pugh	Succeeded by Ebby Edwards and John Marchbank
Preceded by Allan Findlay	President of the Federation of Engineering and Shipbuilding Trades; 1925 – 1933	Succeeded by William Westwood
