= Charles Peat =

British politician and cricketer

Charles Urie Peat MC (28 February 1892 – 27 October 1979) was a British Conservative Party politician and cricketer. He was the son of William Barclay Peat, founder of the international accounting firm KPMG.

Peat was born in Edmonton, Middlesex, and educated at Sedbergh School and Trinity College, Oxford. He played first-class cricket for Oxford University in 1913, Middlesex in 1914 and the Free Foresters between 1920 and 1922, as well as in several matches for HDG Leveson-Gower's XI.

During World War I Peat was commissioned in the City of London Yeomanry and was awarded the Military Cross.

At the 1931 general election, he was elected as Member of Parliament (MP) for Darlington, defeating the sitting Labour MP Arthur Lewis Shepherd. During his time as MP for Darlington, he lived at nearby Wycliffe Hall. During the Second World War, he served as Principal Private Secretary to Prime Minister Winston Churchill. In 1943, he led a campaign to salvage 100 million books for the nation's war effort. Peat was an accountant by profession, and from March to June 1945, he served as Parliamentary Secretary to the Minister of National Insurance. In the Labour landslide at the 1945 general election, he was defeated by Labour's David Hardman. He died at Barnard Castle, County Durham on 27 October 1979.

His grandson, Benjamin Usher, played List A cricket for British Universities and the Durham Cricket Board as well as Minor counties cricket for Northumberland.

Parliament of the United Kingdom
Preceded by Arthur Lewis Shepherd	Member of Parliament for Darlington; 1931–1945	Succeeded by David Hardman
