= Peter Gibson (politician) =

British politician

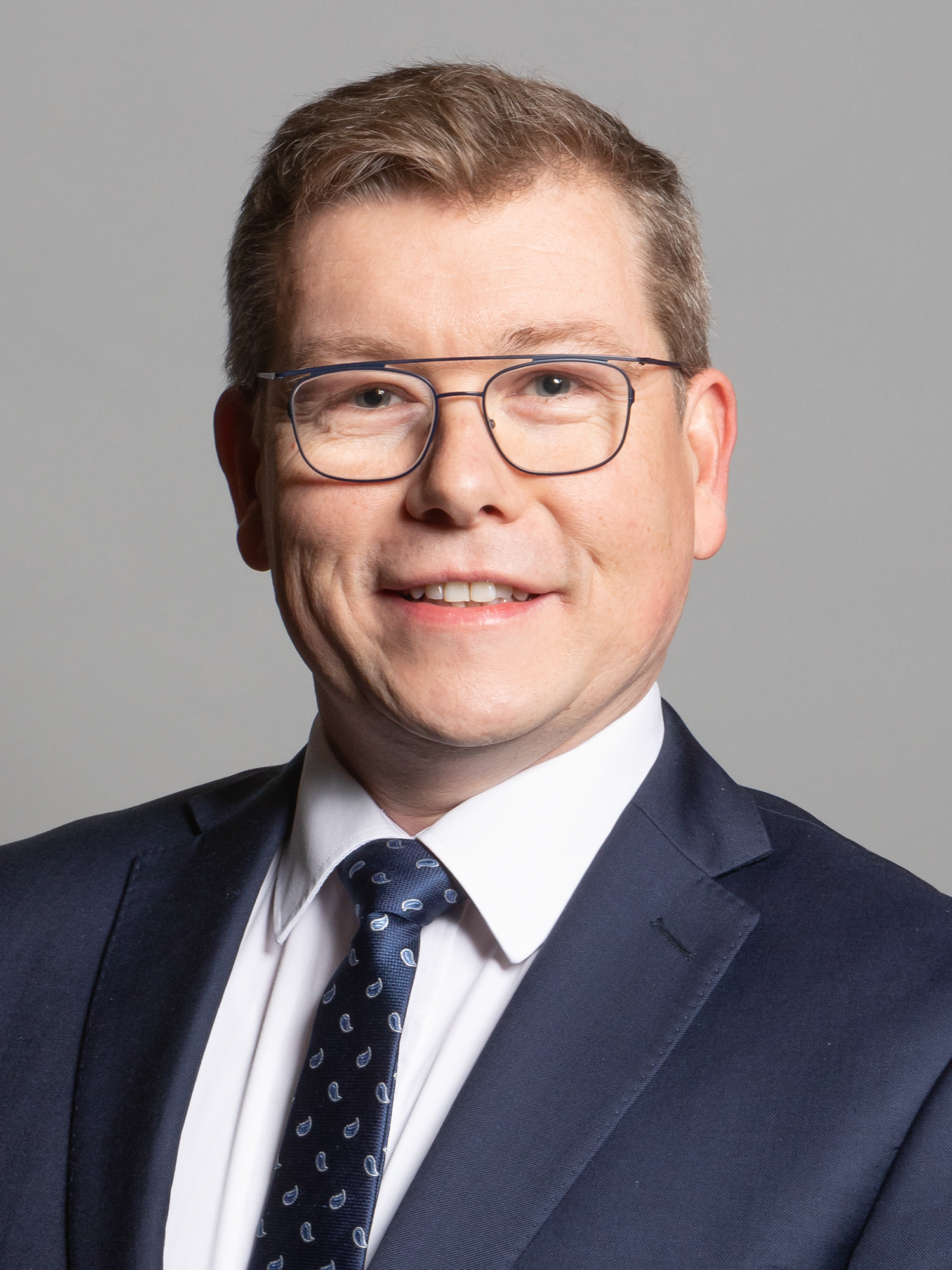
- Official portrait, 2020

Member of Parliament for Darlington
- In office 12 December 2019 – 30 May 2024
- Preceded by: Jenny Chapman
- Succeeded by: Lola McEvoy

Personal details
- Born: 22 May 1975 (age 51) Middlesbrough, England
- Party: Conservative
- Education: Newcastle University
- Website: www.petergibson.org

Peter Alexander Gibson (born 22 May 1975) is a British politician who served as the Member of Parliament (MP) for Darlington from the 2019 general election until losing his parliamentary seat in the 2024 general election. He is a member of the Conservative Party.

== Early life and career ==
Gibson was born in Middlesbrough, North Yorkshire, to parents Alexander Francis Gibson and Anita Gibson (née Popple). He grew up in Saltburn-by-the-Sea, attending the town's Huntcliff Secondary School and then Sir William Turner's Sixth Form College in Redcar. He studied law at the University of Newcastle, graduating with an LLB in 1997. In 2000, he gained a Postgraduate Certificate in Legal Practice from the College of Law in York.

Gibson worked for Corries Solicitors in York from 1998 onwards: he was admitted as a solicitor in 2001, and stayed with the firm in that role until 2005. That year, he joined Minster Law Solicitors in York, and worked as a solicitor for them until 2006.

Prior to being elected as an MP, he worked as a solicitor specialising in personal injury litigation: he was the Principal Solicitor and Managing Director of Coles Solicitors in Northallerton from 2006 to 2019. After selling Coles Solicitors, he was a Managing Director of Kingly Solicitors in London for several months, resigning on the day of the 2019 general election.

He voted Remain in the 2016 Brexit referendum. Gibson is a member of the Rotary Club of Northallerton Mowbray, and became a Paul Harris Fellow of Rotary International in 2019.

In April 2025 Gibson was appointed as the new Chief Executive of Fighting with Pride the LGBT+ Military Veterans Charity

== Parliamentary career ==
Gibson was previously the Conservative parliamentary candidate for Redcar in 2017. He was defeated by Labour incumbent Anna Turley, but increased the Conservative share of the vote by 17%, bringing them from fourth to second place in the constituency with 33.2%.

Gibson defeated Labour's shadow Brexit minister Jenny Chapman at the 2019 general election, taking the seat for the Conservatives for the first time in 27 years and securing a majority of over 3,000.

Gibson used his maiden speech in the House of Commons to advocate several constituency issues. During his first nine months as an MP representing Darlington, Gibson was involved with a number of local projects. In an article published in a regional newspaper, The Northern Echo, Gibson said: "I've spoken with the head of every school and college, and have launched the Darlington Debates competition in conjunction with the amazing Darlington Rotary Club. I've hosted Zoom calls for Scouts, helped pack bags, organised and participated in numerous litterpicks, helped establish the new Friends of North Cemetery and attended their first clean up, and I've lobbied Network Rail to smarten up its bridges which serve as a gateway to our town."

In Parliament, he was a member of the Women and Equalities Committee from March 2020 to June 2021. In March 2020, Gibson said that he took a train journey home while suffering a suspected case of COVID-19, posting a message on his Facebook page saying: "When it was suspected that I had covid I was advised to travel home and isolate in my home, undertaking a 250 mile journey from London."

In October 2020, as part of a protest organised by some Darlington residents, empty plates and teddy bears were placed outside his constituency office after he voted against a Labour Party Opposition Day Motion to extend free school meals over holidays.

On 6 July 2022, he resigned as parliamentary private secretary in the Department for International Trade in protest at Boris Johnson's conduct in the Chris Pincher scandal. His resignation letter criticised "the damage our party has inflicted on itself over the failure to include trans people in the ban on conversion therapy". In September 2022, he was reappointed to the Truss ministry as Parliamentary Private Secretary to the Cabinet Office. He lost his parliamentary seat at the 2024 general election.

== Post-parliamentary career ==
Following his defeat at the 2024 election, Gibson was appointed as Chief Executive Officer at Fighting With Pride, a military charity that supports the health and wellbeing of LGBTQ+ veterans in the United Kingdom.

== Personal life ==
Gibson entered into a civil partnership with Gareth Wedgwood Dadd in 2008. Dadd is deputy leader of North Yorkshire County Council.

Gibson lists his recreations as travel and cinema: he is a member of Easingwold and District Cinema Club.

Parliament of the United Kingdom
Preceded by Jenny Chapman	Member of Parliament for Darlington; 2019–2024	Succeeded by Lola McEvoy
