= 1926 Darlington by-election =

UK parliamentary by-election

The 1926 Darlington by-election was a by-election held on 17 February 1926 for the British House of Commons constituency of Darlington in County Durham.

== Vacancy ==
The seat had become vacant when the sitting Conservative Member of Parliament (MP), William Pease had died on 23 January 1926, aged 60. He had held the seat since a by-election in 1923.

== Candidates ==
The Liberal Party candidate was 51-year-old John Dickie, who had been the MP for Gateshead from 1923 until his defeat at the 1924 general election.

The Labour Party candidate was 42-year-old Arthur Shepherd, and E. H. Pease stood for the Conservatives. Pease had not previously contested a parliamentary election, but Shepherd had contested Darlington in 1924, losing by over 2000 votes to William Pease.

== Result ==
On a slightly increased turnout, the result was a narrow victory for Shepherd. His share of the vote was lower than in 1924, when there had been no Liberal candidate, but the presence of a Liberal in the by-election impacted more heavily on the Conservatives than on Labour.

== Aftermath ==
Shepherd held the seat at the 1929 general election, but was defeated in 1931.

Pease did not stand for Parliament again, but Dickie was elected in 1931 as National Liberal MP for Consett.

Darlington by-election, 17 February 1926
Party	Candidate	Votes	%	±%
Labour	Arthur Shepherd	12,965	44.5	−1.7
Conservative	E. H. Pease	12,636	43.3	−10.5
Liberal	John Dickie	3,573	12.2	New
Majority		329	1.2	N/A
Turnout		29,174	87.6	+1.5
Labour gain from Conservative		Swing	+4.4	

== Previous election ==
General election, October 1924: Darlington
Party	Candidate	Votes	%	±%
Conservative	William Pease	15,174	53.8	+11.6
Labour	Arthur Shepherd	13,008	46.2	+12.6
Majority		2,166	7.6	−1.0
Turnout		28,182	86.1	−0.7
Conservative hold		Swing	−0.5	

== See also ==
- Darlington constituency
- Darlington
- 1923 Darlington by-election
- 1983 Darlington by-election
- List of United Kingdom by-elections (1918–1931)

== Sources ==
- Craig, F. W. S. (1983) [1969]. British parliamentary election results 1918-1949 (3rd ed.). Chichester: Parliamentary Research Services. ISBN 0-900178-06-X.
- Leigh Rayment's Historical List of MPs
