= Oscar Usher =

English rugby player (born 2004)

- Born: 12 June 2004 (age 22)
- Height: 1.97 m (6 ft 6 in)
- Weight: 118 kg (260 lb; 18 st 8 lb)
- University: Northumbria University

Rugby union career
- Position: Lock
Senior career
Years	Team	Apps	(Points)
2023-2025	Darlington Mowden Park		
2025-	Newcastle Red Bulls		

Oscar Usher (born 12 June 2004) is an English rugby union footballer who plays for Rugby Premiership club Newcastle Red Bulls. His preferred position is lock.

== Career ==
Usher attended Leeds Beckett University before transferring to Northumbria University on a sports scholarship and played first-XV rugby union. He also played rugby union for Darlington Mowden Park in the National League 1 from the 2023-24 season.

Usher signed with the Senior Academy at Newcastle Falcons in February 2025. Usher made his senior league debut for Newcastle in the Rugby Premiership on 26 April 2025 against Bath. He started in the first league match for the team in their new guise rebranded as the Newcastle Red Bulls, a 39-17 home defeat to Saracens on 26 September 2025, the opening fixture of the 2025-26 season.
