= 1983 Darlington by-election =

UK parliamentary by-election

- 24 March 1983

Constituency of Darlington
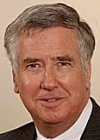
	First party	Second party	Third party
	Lab		SDP
Candidate	Ossie O'Brien	Michael Fallon	Anthony Cook
Party	Labour	Conservative	SDP
Popular vote	20,544	18,132	12,735
Percentage	39.5%	34.9%	24.5%
Swing	▼6.0%	▼8.5%	▲14.3%
MP before election
Edward Fletcher
Labour
Elected MP
Ossie O'Brien
Labour

The 1983 Darlington by-election was a parliamentary by-election held on 24 March 1983 for the UK House of Commons constituency of Darlington in County Durham.

The seat had become vacant when the constituency's Labour Member of Parliament (MP), Edward Fletcher had died on 13 February 1983, at age 71. He had held the seat since the 1964 general election.

The result of the contest was a victory for the Labour candidate, Ossie O'Brien, who won with a majority of 2,412 over the Conservative Party candidate Michael Fallon. O'Brien only held the seat for three months, however, as it fell to Fallon at the general election in June 1983.

The by-election campaign is regarded by many former SDP members, including Bill Rodgers, as having been one that destroyed the SDP's momentum. Anthony Cook, a local television celebrity, was the candidate and appeared to know very little about public issues and made a poor impression. At one point the SDP had been leading in the polls, but in part due to Cook's poor performance as a candidate, highlighted by the coverage from journalist Vincent Hanna, they finished third.

== Result ==
Darlington by-election, 1983
Party	Candidate	Votes	%	±%
Labour	Ossie O'Brien	20,544	39.5	−6.0
Conservative	Michael Fallon	18,132	34.9	−8.5
SDP	Anthony Cook	12,735	24.5	+14.3
Monster Raving Loony	David Sutch	374	0.7	New
Independent	Arthur Clark	164	0.3	New
Tactical Voting Annihilates Bennite Tatchellites	Thomas Keen	27	0.1	New
Yoga and Meditation	Jitendra Bardwaj	15	0.0	New
Republican	Peter Smith	10	0.0	New
Majority		2,412	4.6	+2.5
Turnout		52,001		
Labour hold		Swing	+1.25	

== Previous election ==
General election, 1979: Darlington
Party	Candidate	Votes	%	±%
Labour	Edward Fletcher	22,565	45.52	+0.03
Conservative	Timothy Kirkhope	21,513	43.39	+5.77
Liberal	K. Walker	5,054	10.19	−6.44
National Front	H. Outhwaite	444	0.90	New
Majority		1,052	2.12	−5.81
Turnout		49,576	78.40	+13.43
Labour hold		Swing	−2.82	

== See also ==
- Darlington (UK Parliament constituency)
- Darlington
- 1923 Darlington by-election
- 1926 Darlington by-election
- Lists of United Kingdom by-elections
