= 1923 Darlington by-election =

UK parliamentary by-election

The 1923 Darlington by-election was a by-election held on 28 February 1923 for the British House of Commons constituency of Darlington in County Durham.

== Vacancy ==
The seat had become vacant when the sitting Conservative Member of Parliament (MP), Herbert Pease was elevated to the peerage as Baron Daryngton. He had held the seat since the December 1910 general election.

== Electoral history ==
General election, November 1922: Darlington
Party	Candidate	Votes	%	±%
Conservative	Herbert Pease	13,286	49.7	−11.8
Labour	Will Sherwood	9,048	33.8	New
Liberal	T. Crooks	4,419	16.5	−22.0
Majority		4,238	15.9	−7.1
Turnout		26,753	88.0	+20.2
Conservative hold		Swing		

== Candidates ==
- William Pease, who had not previously contested a parliamentary election, stood for the Conservatives.
- The Labour Party candidate was W.J. Sherwood, who had also fought the seat in 1922, having contested The Hartlepools in 1918.

== Result ==
On a slightly reduced turnout, Pease won the seat with a comfortable majority.

Darlington by-election, 28 February 1923
Party	Candidate	Votes	%	±%
Conservative	William Edwin Pease	14,684	56.6	+6.9
Labour	Will Sherwood	11,271	43.4	+9.6
Majority		3,413	13.2	−2.7
Turnout		25,955	85.3	−2.7
Conservative hold		Swing	−1.4	

== Aftermath ==
Sherwood stood again at the general election in December 1923, losing again to Pease. Pease held the seat until his death in 1926.

== See also ==
- Darlington constituency
- Darlington
- 1926 Darlington by-election
- 1983 Darlington by-election
- List of United Kingdom by-elections (1918–1931)
