= Darlington (constituency) =

Parliamentary constituency in the United Kingdom, 1868 onwards

Coordinates: 54.56°N 1.59°W

- County constituency for the House of Commons
- Interactive map of boundaries since 2024
- Location within North East England
- County: County Durham
- Electorate: 70,446 (March 2020)
- Major settlements: Darlington

Current constituency
- Created: 1868
- Member of Parliament: Lola McEvoy (Labour)
- Seats: One
- Created from: South Durham

Darlington is the parliamentary constituency for the eponymous market town in County Durham in the North East of England. It is currently represented in the House of Commons of the UK Parliament by Lola McEvoy of the Labour Party, who was first elected in 2024. (Note: As with all constituencies, the constituency elects one Member of Parliament (MP) by the first past the post system of election at least every five years.)

The constituency was created for the 1868 election.

== Constituency profile ==
The Darlington constituency is located in County Durham and covers most of the Borough of Darlington. It contains the large town of Darlington and some villages and rural areas to its north and west, including Heighington. Historically a small market town, Darlington grew in population during the late 19th century as a centre for railway manufacturing. The town has high levels of deprivation, with much of it falling within the 10% most-deprived areas in England, although the south-western suburbs of Hummersknott and Blackwell are affluent.

On average, residents of Darlington have lower levels of income, education and professional employment compared to nationwide figures, and house prices are low. At the 2021 census, White people made up 94% of the population. At the local borough council, most of the town is represented by Labour Party councillors, whilst Conservatives and Greens were elected in the rural areas and the wealthy south-west of the town. An estimated 57% of voters in Darlington favoured leaving the European Union in the 2016 referendum, above the nationwide figure of 52%.

== Boundaries ==
=== Historic ===
==== 1868–1885 ====
Under the Reform Act 1867, the proposed contents of the new parliamentary borough were defined as the townships of Darlington, Haughton-le-Skerne, and Cockerton. However, this was amended under the Boundary Act 1868, with the boundary defined as being coterminous with the Municipal Borough of Darlington.

See map on Vision of Britain website.

==== 1885–1918 ====
As defined in 1868 with minor amendments.

==== 1918–1983 ====
The County Borough of Darlington.

The boundaries were adjusted in 1918, 1950 and 1973 to reflect changes to the boundaries of the county borough.

==== 1983–2010 ====
The Borough of Darlington wards of Bank Top, Central, Cockerton East, Cockerton West, College, Eastbourne North, Eastbourne South, Harrowgate Hill, Haughton East, Haughton West, Hummersknott, Lascelles, Lingfield, Mowden, Northgate North, Northgate South, North Road, Park East, Park West, and Pierremont.

No change to boundaries.

Map of boundaries 2010–2024

==== 2010–2024 ====
The Borough of Darlington wards of Bank Top, Central, Cockerton East, Cockerton West, College, Eastbourne, Faverdale, Harrowgate Hill, Haughton East, Haughton North, Haughton West, Hummersknott, Lascelles, Lingfield, Mowden, Northgate, North Road, Park East, Park West, and Pierremont.

Minor change to reflect new ward boundaries.

=== Current ===
Further to the 2023 review of Westminster constituencies, which came into effect for the 2024 general election, the constituency is composed of the following electoral divisions of the Borough of Darlington (as they existed on 1 December 2020):

- Bank Top & Lascelles; Brinkburn & Faverdale; Cockerton; College; Eastbourne; Harrowgate Hill; Haughton & Springfield; Heighington & Coniscliffe; Hummersknott; Mowden; North Road; Northgate; Park East; Park West; Pierremont; Red Hall & Lingfield; Stephenson; Whinfield.

The constituency was expanded slightly to bring the electorate within the permitted range, by adding the rural ward of Heighington & Coniscliffe from the abolished constituency of Sedgefield.

== Political history ==
The seat has been held by all three major parties in its long existence, but has been a marginal constituency between the Labour and Conservative parties in the years since the Second World War. Labour held the seat for 27 years from 1992 with their candidate Jenny Chapman winning the seat in 2010 with a 3,388 majority down from 10,404 in the previous election. In 2015, her majority over the Conservatives fell to 3,158. In the 2019 general election Conservative Peter Gibson defeated Chapman with a 3,294 majority before being defeated himself in 2024 by Lola McEvoy of Labour by a margin of 2,298

== Members of Parliament ==
Election	Member	Party
1868	Edmund Backhouse	Liberal
1880	Theodore Fry	Liberal
1895	Arthur Pease	Liberal Unionist
1898 by-election	Herbert Pease	Liberal Unionist
1910	Trebitsch Lincoln	Liberal
1910	Herbert Pease	Unionist
1923 by-election	William Edwin Pease	Unionist
1926 by-election	Arthur Shepherd	Labour
1931	Charles Peat	Conservative
1945	David Hardman	Labour
1951	Fergus Graham	Conservative
1959	Anthony Bourne-Arton	Conservative
1964	Ted Fletcher	Labour
1983 by-election	Ossie O'Brien	Labour
1983	Michael Fallon	Conservative
1992	Alan Milburn	Labour
2010	Jenny Chapman	Labour
2019	Peter Gibson	Conservative
2024	Lola McEvoy	Labour

== Elections ==
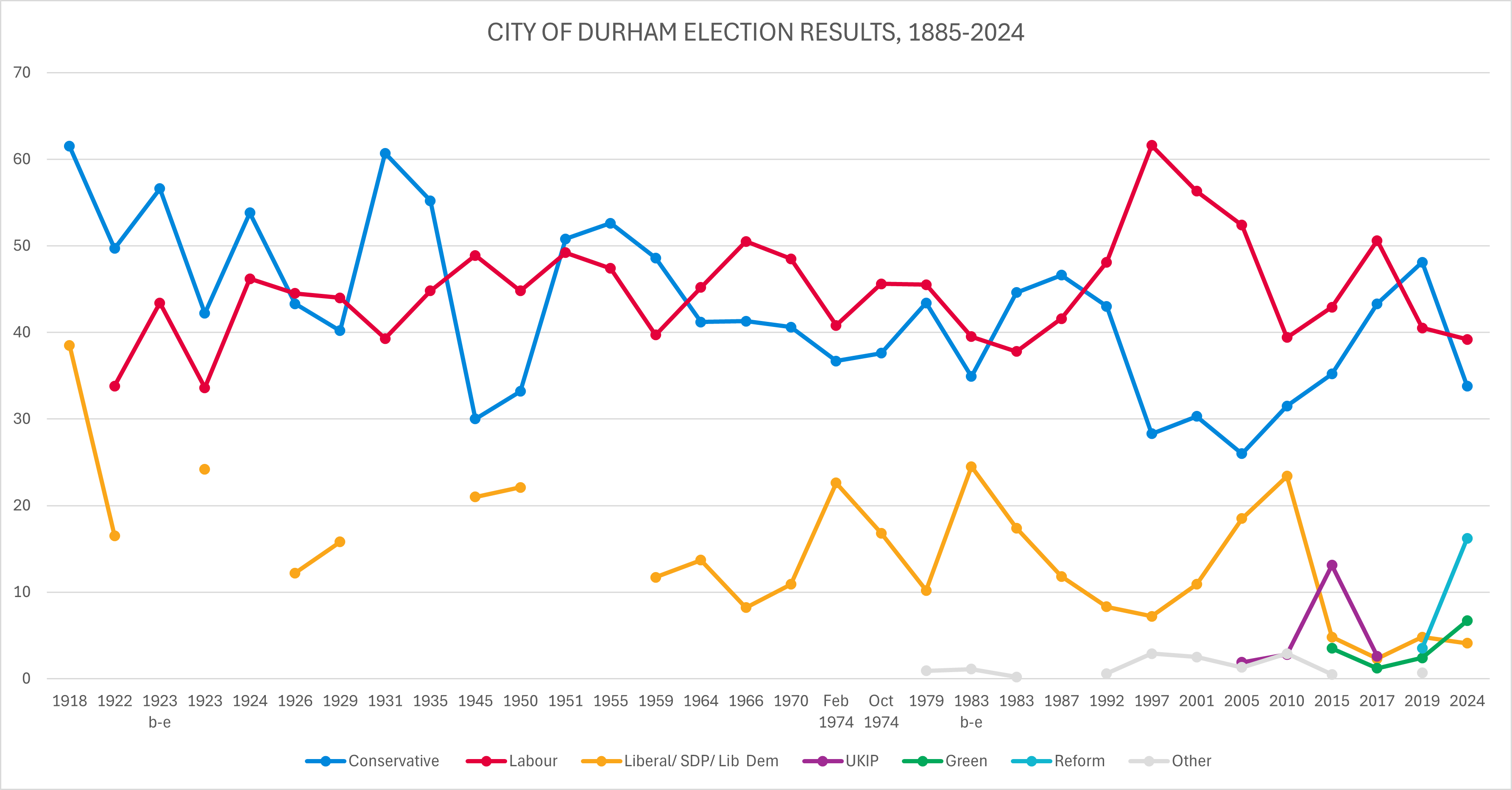
Election results 1885-2024

=== Elections in the 2020s ===
General election 2024: Darlington
Party	Candidate	Votes	%	±%
Labour	Lola McEvoy	16,621	39.2	−0.9
Conservative	Peter Gibson	14,323	33.8	−15.9
Reform	Michael Walker	6,852	16.2	+12.6
Green	Matthew Snedker	2,847	6.7	+4.2
Liberal Democrats	Simon Thorley	1,735	4.1	−0.5
Majority		2,298	5.4	N/A
Turnout		42,378	59.9	−5.8
Labour gain from Conservative		Swing	+8.1	

=== Elections in the 2010s ===
General election 2019: Darlington
Party	Candidate	Votes	%	±%
Conservative	Peter Gibson	20,901	48.1	+4.8
Labour	Jenny Chapman	17,607	40.5	–10.1
Liberal Democrats	Anne-Marie Curry	2,097	4.8	+2.5
Brexit Party	Dave Mawson	1,544	3.5	New
Green	Matthew Snedker	1,057	2.4	+1.2
Independent	Monty Brack	292	0.7	New
Majority		3,294	7.6	N/A
Turnout		43,498	65.6	−2.0
Conservative gain from Labour		Swing	+7.4	

General election 2017: Darlington
Party	Candidate	Votes	%	±%
Labour	Jenny Chapman	22,681	50.6	+7.7
Conservative	Peter Cuthbertson	19,401	43.3	+8.1
UKIP	Kevin Brack	1,180	2.6	−10.5
Liberal Democrats	Anne-Marie Curry	1,031	2.3	−2.5
Green	Matthew Snedker	524	1.2	−2.3
Majority		3,280	7.3	−0.4
Turnout		44,817	67.6	+5.1
Labour hold		Swing	−0.2	

General election 2015: Darlington
Party	Candidate	Votes	%	±%
Labour	Jenny Chapman	17,637	42.9	+3.5
Conservative	Peter Cuthbertson	14,479	35.2	+3.7
UKIP	David Hodgson	5,392	13.1	+10.3
Liberal Democrats	Anne-Marie Curry	1,966	4.8	−18.6
Green	Michael Cherrington	1,444	3.5	New
TUSC	Alan Docherty	223	0.5	New
Majority		3,158	7.7	−0.2
Turnout		41,141	62.5	+0.6
Labour hold		Swing	−0.1	

In the 2015 election, 89 ballot papers were issued omitting the UKIP candidate before the error was corrected.

General election 2010: Darlington
Party	Candidate	Votes	%	±%
Labour	Jenny Chapman	16,891	39.4	−13.0
Conservative	Edward Legard	13,503	31.5	+5.5
Liberal Democrats	Mike Barker	10,046	23.4	+4.9
BNP	Amanda Foster	1,262	2.9	New
UKIP	Charlotte Bull	1,194	2.8	+0.9
Majority		3,388	7.9	−18.5
Turnout		42,896	61.9	+1.6
Labour hold		Swing	−9.2	

=== Elections in the 2000s ===
General election 2005: Darlington
Party	Candidate	Votes	%	±%
Labour	Alan Milburn	20,643	52.4	−3.9
Conservative	Anthony Frieze	10,239	26.0	−4.3
Liberal Democrats	Robert Adamson	7,269	18.5	+7.6
UKIP	John Hoodless	730	1.9	New
Veritas	David Davies	507	1.3	New
Majority		10,404	26.4	+0.4
Turnout		39,388	60.88	−1.2
Labour hold		Swing	+0.2	

General election 2001: Darlington
Party	Candidate	Votes	%	±%
Labour	Alan Milburn	22,479	56.3	−5.3
Conservative	Tony Richmond	12,095	30.3	+2.0
Liberal Democrats	Robert Adamson	4,358	10.9	+3.7
Socialist Alliance	Alan Docherty	469	1.2	New
Independent	Craig Platt	269	0.7	New
Socialist Labour	Amanda Rose	229	0.6	New
Majority		10,384	26.0	−7.3
Turnout		39,899	62.1	−11.8
Labour hold		Swing	−3.6	

=== Elections in the 1990s ===
General election 1997: Darlington
Party	Candidate	Votes	%	±%
Labour	Alan Milburn	29,658	61.6	+13.5
Conservative	Peter Scrope	13,633	28.3	−14.7
Liberal Democrats	Leslie Boxell	3,483	7.2	−1.1
Referendum	Michael Blakey	1,399	2.9	New
Majority		16,025	33.3	+28.2
Turnout		48,172	73.9	−9.7
Labour hold		Swing	+14.1	

General election 1992: Darlington
Party	Candidate	Votes	%	±%
Labour	Alan Milburn	26,556	48.1	+6.5
Conservative	Michael Fallon	23,758	43.0	−3.6
Liberal Democrats	Peter Bergg	4,586	8.3	−3.5
BNP	Donald Clarke	355	0.6	New
Majority		2,798	5.1	N/A
Turnout		55,255	83.6	+2.8
Labour gain from Conservative		Swing	+5.0	

=== Elections in the 1980s ===
General election 1987: Darlington
Party	Candidate	Votes	%	±%
Conservative	Michael Fallon	24,831	46.6	+2.0
Labour	Ossie O'Brien	22,170	41.6	+3.8
Liberal	Arthur Collinge	6,289	11.8	−5.6
Majority		2,661	5.0	−1.8
Turnout		53,290	80.8	0.0
Conservative hold		Swing		

General election 1983: Darlington
Party	Candidate	Votes	%	±%
Conservative	Michael Fallon	22,434	44.6	
Labour	Ossie O'Brien	18,996	37.8	
SDP	Ray Dutton	8,737	17.4	
Christian Democratic Party	A.H. Clark	108	0.2	New
Majority		3,438	6.8	N/A
Turnout		50,275	80.8	
Conservative gain from Labour		Swing		

1983 Darlington by-election
Party	Candidate	Votes	%	±%
Labour	Ossie O'Brien	20,544	39.5	−6.0
Conservative	Michael Fallon	18,132	34.9	−8.5
SDP	Anthony Cook	12,735	24.5	+14.3
Monster Raving Loony	Screaming Lord Sutch	374	0.7	New
Independent	Arthur Clark	164	0.3	New
Tactical Voting Annihilates Bennite Tatchellites	Thomas Keen	27	0.1	New
Yoga and Meditation	Jitendra Bardwaj	15	0.0	New
Republican	Peter Smith	10	0.0	New
Majority		2,412	4.6	+2.5
Turnout		52,001		
Labour hold		Swing	+1.25	

=== Elections in the 1970s ===
General election 1979: Darlington
Party	Candidate	Votes	%	±%
Labour	Edward Fletcher	22,565	45.52	0.0
Conservative	Timothy Kirkhope	21,513	43.39	+5.8
Liberal	K. Walker	5,054	10.19	−6.4
National Front	H. Outhwaite	444	0.90	New
Majority		1,052	2.12	−5.8
Turnout		49,576	78.40	+4.00
Labour hold		Swing	−2.82	

General election October 1974: Darlington
Party	Candidate	Votes	%	±%
Labour	Edward Fletcher	21,334	45.55	
Conservative	Brian Hord	17,620	37.62	
Liberal	Peter Freitag	7,882	16.83	
Majority		3,714	7.93	
Turnout		46,836	74.40	
Labour hold		Swing		

General election February 1974: Darlington
Party	Candidate	Votes	%	±%
Labour	Edward Fletcher	20,546	40.75	
Conservative	Brian Hord	18,477	36.65	
Liberal	Peter Freitag	11,398	22.61	
Majority		2,069	4.10	
Turnout		50,421	80.78	
Labour hold		Swing		

General election 1970: Darlington
Party	Candidate	Votes	%	±%
Labour	Edward Fletcher	23,208	48.47	
Conservative	Anthony Bourne-Arton	19,447	40.62	
Liberal	Stuart S. Newton	5,222	10.91	
Majority		3,761	7.85	
Turnout		47,877	76.44	
Labour hold		Swing		

=== Elections in the 1960s ===
General election 1966: Darlington
Party	Candidate	Votes	%	±%
Labour	Edward Fletcher	23,909	50.50	
Conservative	Anthony Bourne-Arton	19,546	41.28	
Liberal	Robert Oakeshott	3,891	8.22	
Majority		4,363	9.22	
Turnout		47,346	82.26	
Labour hold		Swing		

General election 1964: Darlington
Party	Candidate	Votes	%	±%
Labour	Edward Fletcher	21,751	45.15	
Conservative	Anthony Bourne-Arton	19,841	41.19	
Liberal	Gurney Pease	6,578	13.66	
Majority		1,910	3.96	N/A
Turnout		48,170	82.98	
Labour gain from Conservative		Swing		

=== Elections in the 1950s ===
General election 1959: Darlington
Party	Candidate	Votes	%	±%
Conservative	Anthony Bourne-Arton	24,318	48.56	
Labour	Ronald Lewis	19,901	39.74	
Liberal	John Patrick McQuade	5,863	11.71	New
Majority		4,417	8.82	
Turnout		50,082	84.40	
Conservative hold		Swing		

General election 1955: Darlington
Party	Candidate	Votes	%	±%
Conservative	Fergus Graham	25,765	52.64	
Labour	Arnold John Parkinson	23,184	47.36	
Majority		2,581	5.28	
Turnout		48,949	82.34	
Conservative hold		Swing		

General election 1951: Darlington
Party	Candidate	Votes	%	±%
Conservative	Fergus Graham	26,858	50.77	
Labour	David Hardman	26,045	49.23	
Majority		813	1.54	N/A
Turnout		52,903	87.11	
Conservative gain from Labour		Swing		

General election 1950: Darlington
Party	Candidate	Votes	%	±%
Labour	David Hardman	23,528	44.78	
Conservative	Geraldyne Edith Mary Walford	17,421	33.16	
Liberal	Gordon Victor Rogers	11,588	22.06	
Majority		6,107	11.62	
Turnout		52,537	88.48	
Labour hold		Swing		

=== Election in the 1940s ===
General election 1945: Darlington
Party	Candidate	Votes	%	±%
Labour	David Hardman	21,442	48.91	
Conservative	Charles Peat	13,153	30.02	
Liberal	Gordon Victor Rogers	9,215	21.03	
Majority		8,289	18.89	N/A
Turnout		43,810	80.09	
Labour gain from Conservative		Swing		

=== Elections in the 1930s ===
General election 1935: Darlington
Party	Candidate	Votes	%	±%
Conservative	Charles Peat	22,320	55.21	
Labour	Arthur Shepherd	18,105	44.79	
Majority		4,215	10.42	
Turnout		40,435	84.79	
Conservative hold		Swing		

General election 1931: Darlington
Party	Candidate	Votes	%	±%
Conservative	Charles Peat	24,416	60.72	
Labour	Arthur Shepherd	15,798	39.28	
Majority		8,618	21.44	N/A
Turnout		40,214	89.47	
Conservative gain from Labour		Swing		

=== Elections in the 1920s ===
General election 1929: Darlington
Party	Candidate	Votes	%	±%
Labour	Arthur Shepherd	17,061	44.0	−0.5
Unionist	Robert Stewart	15,596	40.2	−3.1
Liberal	John Joseph Richardson	6,149	15.8	+3.6
Majority		1,465	3.8	+2.6
Turnout		38,806	89.6	+2.0
Labour hold		Swing	+1.3	

1926 Darlington by-election
Party	Candidate	Votes	%	±%
Labour	Arthur Shepherd	12,965	44.5	−1.7
Unionist	E. H. Pease	12,636	43.3	−10.5
Liberal	John Dickie	3,573	12.2	New
Majority		329	1.2	N/A
Turnout		29,174	87.6	+1.5
Labour gain from Unionist		Swing	+4.4	

General election 1924: Darlington
Party	Candidate	Votes	%	±%
Unionist	William Edwin Pease	15,174	53.8	+11.6
Labour	Arthur Shepherd	13,008	46.2	+12.6
Majority		2,166	7.6	−1.0
Turnout		28,182	86.1	−0.7
Unionist hold		Swing	−0.5	

General election 1923: Darlington
Party	Candidate	Votes	%	±%
Unionist	William Edwin Pease	11,638	42.2	−14.4
Labour	Will Sherwood	9,284	33.6	−9.8
Liberal	Robert Wright	6,697	24.2	New
Majority		2,354	8.6	−4.6
Turnout		27,619	86.8	+1.5
Unionist hold		Swing	−2.3	

1923 Darlington by-election
Party	Candidate	Votes	%	±%
Unionist	William Edwin Pease	14,684	56.6	+6.9
Labour	Will Sherwood	11,271	43.4	+9.6
Majority		3,413	13.2	−2.7
Turnout		25,955	85.3	−2.7
Unionist hold		Swing	−1.4	

General election 1922: Darlington
Party	Candidate	Votes	%	±%
Unionist	Herbert Pease	13,286	49.7	−11.8
Labour	Will Sherwood	9,048	33.8	New
Liberal	Thomas Crooks	4,419	16.5	−22.0
Majority		4,238	15.9	−7.1
Turnout		26,753	88.0	+20.2
Unionist hold		Swing	N/A	

== Election results 1868–1918 ==
=== Elections in the 1860s ===
General election 1868: Darlington
Party	Candidate	Votes	%	±%
Liberal	Edmund Backhouse	1,789	67.2	
Independent Liberal	Henry King Spark	875	32.8	
Majority		914	34.4	
Turnout		2,664	87.1	
Registered electors		3,057		
Liberal win (new seat)				

=== Elections in the 1870s ===
General election 1874: Darlington
Party	Candidate	Votes	%	±%
Liberal	Edmund Backhouse	1,625	45.9	−21.3
Independent Liberal	Henry King Spark	1,607	45.4	+12.6
Conservative	Thomas Gibson Bowles	305	8.6	New
Majority		18	0.5	−33.9
Turnout		3,537	86.8	−0.3
Registered electors		4,073		
Liberal hold		Swing	−17.0	

=== Elections in the 1880s ===
General election 1880: Darlington
Party	Candidate	Votes	%	±%
Liberal	Theodore Fry	2,772	67.6	+21.7
Independent Liberal	Henry King Spark	1,331	32.4	−13.0
Majority		1,441	35.2	+34.7
Turnout		4,103	82.6	−4.2
Registered electors		4,966		
Liberal hold		Swing	+17.4	

Wilson-Todd

General election 1885: Darlington
Party	Candidate	Votes	%	±%
Liberal	Theodore Fry	3,302	61.2	−6.4
Conservative	William Wilson-Todd	2,096	38.8	New
Majority		1,206	22.4	−12.8
Turnout		5,398	91.4	+8.8
Registered electors		5,907		
Liberal hold		Swing		

General election 1886: Darlington
Party	Candidate	Votes	%	±%
Liberal	Theodore Fry	2,620	50.5	–10.7
Liberal Unionist	H. O. Arnold-Forster	2,563	49.5	+10.7
Majority		57	1.0	–21.4
Turnout		5,183	87.7	–3.7
Registered electors		5,907		
Liberal hold		Swing	–10.7	

=== Elections in the 1890s ===
General election 1892: Darlington
Party	Candidate	Votes	%	±%
Liberal	Theodore Fry	2,866	50.5	0.0
Liberal Unionist	Arthur Pease	2,810	49.5	0.0
Majority		56	1.0	0.0
Turnout		5,676	93.9	+6.2
Registered electors		6,045		
Liberal hold		Swing	0.0	

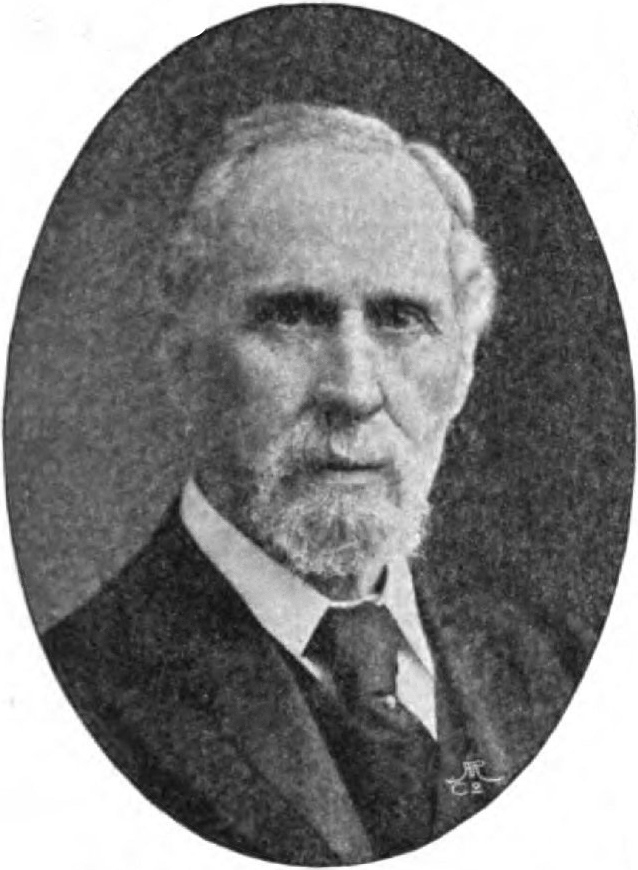

General election 1895: Darlington
Party	Candidate	Votes	%	±%
Liberal Unionist	Arthur Pease	3,354	55.4	+5.9
Liberal	Theodore Fry	2,697	44.6	–5.9
Majority		657	10.8	N/A
Turnout		6,051	92.2	–1.7
Registered electors		6,560		
Liberal Unionist gain from Liberal		Swing	+5.9	

Pease's death causes a by-election.

Philipps

1898 Darlington by-election
Party	Candidate	Votes	%	±%
Liberal Unionist	Herbert Pease	3,497	55.5	+0.1
Liberal	Owen Philipps	2,809	44.5	−0.1
Majority		688	11.0	+0.2
Turnout		6,306	90.7	−1.5
Registered electors		6,952		
Liberal Unionist hold		Swing	+0.1	

=== Elections in the 1900s ===
General election 1900: Darlington
Party	Candidate	Votes	%	±%
Liberal Unionist	Herbert Pease	Unopposed		
Liberal Unionist hold				

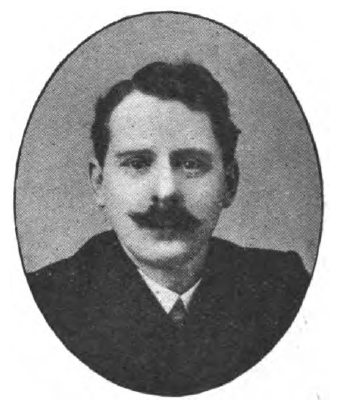
Mitchell

General election 1906: Darlington
Party	Candidate	Votes	%	±%
Liberal Unionist	Herbert Pease	4,375	51.7	N/A
Labour Repr. Cmte.	Isaac Mitchell	4,087	48.3	New
Majority		288	3.4	N/A
Turnout		8,462	93.2	N/A
Registered electors		9,078		
Liberal Unionist hold		Swing	N/A	

=== Elections in the 1910s ===
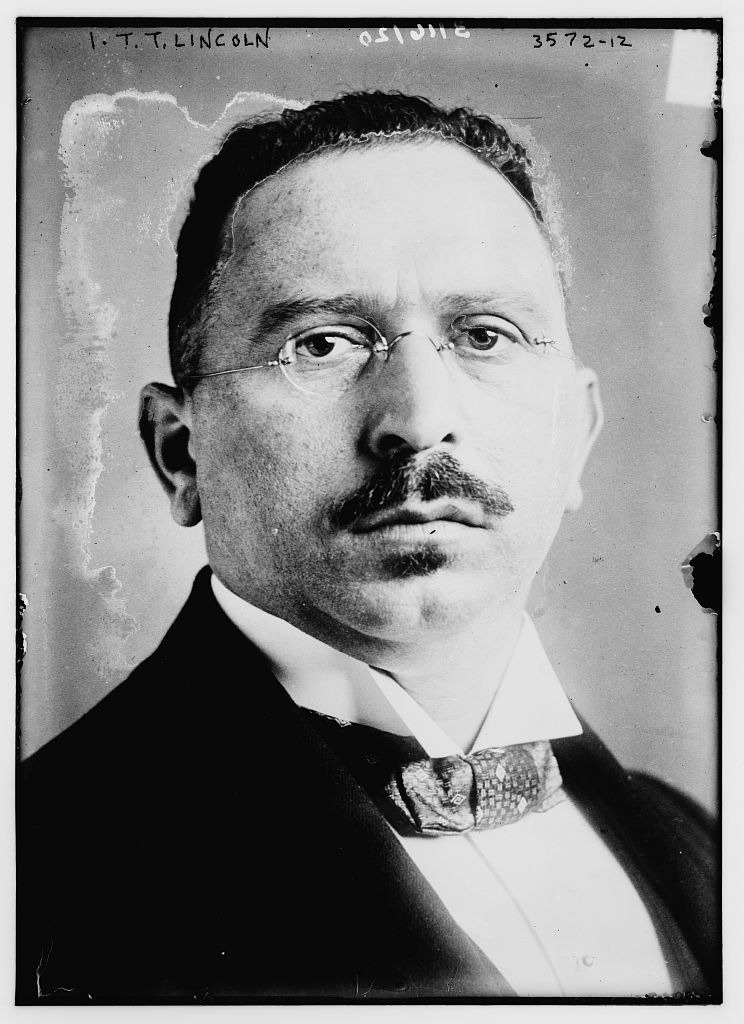
Lincoln

General election January 1910: Darlington
Party	Candidate	Votes	%	±%
Liberal	Ignaz Trebitsch-Lincoln	4,815	50.2	New
Liberal Unionist	Herbert Pease	4,786	49.8	−1.9
Majority		29	0.4	N/A
Turnout		9,601	95.1	+1.9
Registered electors		10,097		
Liberal gain from Liberal Unionist		Swing		

Maddison

General election December 1910: Darlington
Party	Candidate	Votes	%	±%
Liberal Unionist	Herbert Pease	4,881	52.2	+2.4
Lib-Lab	Frederick Maddison	4,475	47.8	−2.4
Majority		406	4.4	N/A
Turnout		9,356	92.7	−2.4
Registered electors		10,097		
Liberal Unionist gain from Liberal		Swing	+2.4	

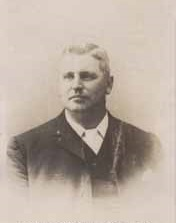
Scott

General Election 1914–15:

Another General Election was required to take place before the end of 1915. The political parties had been making preparations for an election to take place and by July 1914, the following candidates had been selected;

- Unionist: Herbert Pease
- Liberal: Alfred Scott
- Labour: T. Russell Williams

General election 1918: Darlington
Party		Candidate	Votes	%	±%
C	Unionist	Herbert Pease	11,951	61.5	+9.3
	Liberal	Alfred Scott	7,494	38.5	−9.3
Majority			4,457	23.0	+18.6
Turnout			19,445	67.8	−24.9
	Unionist hold		Swing	+9.3	
C indicates candidate endorsed by the coalition government.

== See also ==
- Parliamentary constituencies in County Durham
- History of parliamentary constituencies and boundaries in Durham
- List of parliamentary constituencies in North East England (region)
- 1923 Darlington by-election
- 1926 Darlington by-election
- 1983 Darlington by-election
