= Baron Inglewood =

Title in the Peerage of the United Kingdom

The arms of Vane: Azure, three sinister gauntlets Or

Baron Inglewood, of Hutton in the Forest in the County of Cumberland, is a title in the Peerage of the United Kingdom.

It was created on 30 June 1964 for the Conservative politician William Fletcher-Vane. He was the son of Lieutenant-Colonel the Hon. William Lyonel Vane, younger brother of Henry Vane, 9th Baron Barnard, who had succeeded to the barony of Barnard in 1891 on the death of his distant relative Harry Powlett, 4th Duke of Cleveland and 8th Baron Barnard. William Lyonel Vane and his brother, the ninth Baron Barnard, were both great-great-grandsons of Hon. Morgan Vane, younger son of Gilbert Vane, 2nd Baron Barnard, whose eldest son, the third Baron, was created Earl of Darlington, and from whom the Dukes of Cleveland descended.

The family seat is Hutton in the Forest, near Penrith, Cumbria. The title and the name of the house refer to the ancient Royal Forest of Inglewood.

As of 2017 the title is held by his eldest son, the second Baron, who succeeded in 1989. He is also a Conservative politician and one of the ninety elected hereditary peers that remain in the House of Lords after the passing of the House of Lords Act 1999. Created in 1964, the barony of Inglewood is one of the last hereditary baronies created in the Peerage of the United Kingdom.

== Barons Inglewood (1964) ==
- William Morgan Fletcher-Vane, 1st Baron Inglewood (1909–1989)
- William Richard Fletcher-Vane, 2nd Baron Inglewood (born 1951)

The heir apparent is the present holder's son, the Hon. Henry William Frederick Fletcher-Vane (born 1990)

== Family tree ==
Family trees of the Dukes of Cleveland, Dukes of Southampton, and Earls of Darlington, Barons Barnard, and subsidiary titles

Duke of Cleveland (1st creation), Earl of Southampton, Baron of Nonsuch, 1670 | Baron Barnard, of Barnard Castle in the Bishopric of Durham
Barbara Palmer; 1640–1709; 1st Duchess of Cleveland, Countess of Southampton, and Baroness Nonsuch | King Charles II; 1630–1685 | Christopher Vane; 1653–1723; 1st Baron Barnard | Ernest Augustus; 1629–1698; Elector of Hanover
Duke of Southampton, Earl of Chichester (2nd creation), and Baron Newbury, 1675 | Earl of Darlington (1st creation) and Baron of Brentford, 1722
Charles FitzRoy; 1662–1730; 2nd Duke of Cleveland, Earl of Southampton, and Baron Nonsuch, 1st Duke of Southampton, Earl of Chichester, and Baron Newbury | Henry Vane; 1676–1676 | Gilbert Vane; 1678–1753; 2nd Baron Barnard | King George I 1660–1727 | Sophia von Kielmansegg; 1675–1725; Countess of Leinster, Countess of Darlington and Baroness of Brentford
Earldom of Darlington (1st creation) and Barony of Brentford extinct, 1725
Earl of Darlington (2nd creation) and Viscount Barnard, 1754
William FitzRoy; 1698–1774; 3rd Duke of Cleveland, Earl of Southampton, and Baron Nonsuch, 2nd Duke of Southampton, Earl of Chichester, and Baron Newbury | Grace Fitzroy; 1697–1763 | Henry Vane c. 1705–1758; 1st Earl of Darlington and Viscount Barnard, 3rd Baron Barnard | Morgan Vane; 1706–1779
Dukedoms of Cleveland (1st creation) and Southampton, and Marquess of Cleveland extinct, 1774
Henry Vane; 1726–1792; 2nd Earl of Darlington and Viscount Barnard, 4th Baron Barnard | Frederick Vane; 1732–1801 | Raby Vane; 1736–1769 | Morgan Vane; 1737–1789
Marquess of Cleveland, 1827; Duke of Cleveland (2nd creation) and Baron Raby (2nd creation), 1833
William Harry Vane; 1766–1842; 1st Duke of Cleveland, Marquess of Cleveland, and Baron Raby, 3rd Earl of Darlington and Viscount Barnard, 5th Baron Barnard | John Vane; 1788–1849
Henry Vane; 1788–1864; 2nd Duke of Cleveland, Marquess of Cleveland, and Baron Raby, 4th Earl of Darlington and Viscount Barnard, 6th Baron Barnard | William John Frederick Vane; 1792–1864; 3rd Duke of Cleveland, Marquess of Cleveland, and Baron Raby, 5th Earl of Darlington and Viscount Barnard, 7th Baron Barnard | Harry George Powlett; 1803–1891; 4th Duke of Cleveland, Marquess of Cleveland, and Baron Raby, 6th Earl of Darlington and Viscount Barnard, 8th Baron Barnard | Henry Morgan Vane; 1808–1886
Dukedom of Cleveland (2nd creation), Marquessate of Cleveland, Earldom of Darlington (2nd creation), Viscount Barnard, and Barony Raby (2nd creation) declared extinct, 1891
Henry de Vere Vane; 1854–1918; 9th Baron Barnard | William Lyonel Vane
Baron Inglewood, 1964
Henry Cecil Vane; 1882–1917 | Christopher William Vane; 1888–1964; 10th Baron Barnard | William Morgan Fletcher-Vane; 1909–1989; 1st Baron Inglewood
Harry John Neville Vane; 1923–2016; 11th Baron Barnard
Henry Francis Cecil Vane b. 1959; 12th Baron Barnard | William Richard Fletcher-Vane b. 1951; 2nd Baron Inglewood
William Henry Cecil Vane b. 2005 | Henry William Frederick Fletcher-Vane b. 1990

== See also ==
- Fletcher-Vane baronets
- Baron Barnard
- Duke of Cleveland
- Viscount Vane
- Vane-Tempest baronets
