= Earl of Darlington =

Title in British Peerage (created 1722, 1754)

Earl of Darlington is a title that has been created twice, each time in the Peerage of Great Britain. Baroness von Kielmansegg, half-sister of King George I, was made countess of Darlington in 1722. This creation was for life only, and so the title expired on her death in 1725.

The second creation came in 1754 in favour of Henry Vane, 3rd Baron Barnard, who became the first Earl of Darlington.

- Henry Vane, 1st Earl of Darlington (c. 1705–1758)
- Henry Vane, 2nd Earl of Darlington (1726–1792)
- William Harry Vane, 3rd Earl of Darlington (1766–1842)

In 1827 Lord Darlington was created Marquess of Cleveland and in 1833 Duke of Cleveland.

- William Harry Vane, 1st Duke of Cleveland (1766–1842)
- Henry Vane, 2nd Duke of Cleveland (1788–1864)
- William John Frederick Vane, 3rd Duke of Cleveland (1792–1864)
- Harry George Powlett, 4th Duke of Cleveland (1803–1891)

== Family tree ==
Family trees of the Dukes of Cleveland, Dukes of Southampton, and Earls of Darlington, Barons Barnard, and subsidiary titles

Duke of Cleveland (1st creation), Earl of Southampton, Baron of Nonsuch, 1670	Baron Barnard, of Barnard Castle in the Bishopric of Durham
Barbara Palmer; 1640–1709; 1st Duchess of Cleveland, Countess of Southampton, and Baroness Nonsuch	King Charles II; 1630–1685	Christopher Vane; 1653–1723; 1st Baron Barnard	Ernest Augustus; 1629–1698; Elector of Hanover
Duke of Southampton, Earl of Chichester (2nd creation), and Baron Newbury, 1675	Earl of Darlington (1st creation) and Baron of Brentford, 1722	Viscount Vane and Baron Vane of Dungannon in the County of Tyrone, 1720
Charles FitzRoy; 1662–1730; 2nd Duke of Cleveland, Earl of Southampton, and Baron Nonsuch, 1st Duke of Southampton, Earl of Chichester, and Baron Newbury	Henry Vane; 1676–1676	Gilbert Vane; 1678–1753; 2nd Baron Barnard	King George I 1660–1727	Sophia von Kielmansegg; 1675–1725; Countess of Leinster, Countess of Darlington and Baroness of Brentford	William Vane; 1682–1734; 1st Viscount Vane
Earldom of Darlington (1st creation) and Barony of Brentford extinct, 1725
Earl of Darlington (2nd creation) and Viscount Barnard, 1754
William FitzRoy; 1698–1774; 3rd Duke of Cleveland, Earl of Southampton, and Baron Nonsuch, 2nd Duke of Southampton, Earl of Chichester, and Baron Newbury	Grace Fitzroy; 1697–1763	Henry Vane c. 1705–1758; 1st Earl of Darlington and Viscount Barnard, 3rd Baron Barnard	Morgan Vane; 1706–1779	William Holles Vane; 1714–1789; 2nd Viscount Vane
Dukedoms of Cleveland (1st creation) and Southampton, and Marquess of Cleveland extinct, 1774	Viscouncy Vane and Barony Vane extinct, 1789
Henry Vane; 1726–1792; 2nd Earl of Darlington and Viscount Barnard, 4th Baron Barnard	Frederick Vane; 1732–1801	Raby Vane; 1736–1769	Morgan Vane; 1737–1789
Marquess of Cleveland, 1827; Duke of Cleveland (2nd creation) and Baron Raby (2nd creation), 1833
William Harry Vane; 1766–1842; 1st Duke of Cleveland, Marquess of Cleveland, and Baron Raby, 3rd Earl of Darlington and Viscount Barnard, 5th Baron Barnard	John Vane; 1788–1849
Henry Vane; 1788–1864; 2nd Duke of Cleveland, Marquess of Cleveland, and Baron Raby, 4th Earl of Darlington and Viscount Barnard, 6th Baron Barnard	William John Frederick Vane; 1792–1864; 3rd Duke of Cleveland, Marquess of Cleveland, and Baron Raby, 5th Earl of Darlington and Viscount Barnard, 7th Baron Barnard	Harry George Powlett; 1803–1891; 4th Duke of Cleveland, Marquess of Cleveland, and Baron Raby, 6th Earl of Darlington and Viscount Barnard, 8th Baron Barnard	Henry Morgan Vane; 1808–1886
Dukedom of Cleveland (2nd creation), Marquessate of Cleveland, Earldom of Darlington (2nd creation), Viscount Barnard, and Barony Raby (2nd creation) declared extinct, 1891
Henry de Vere Vane; 1854–1918; 9th Baron Barnard	William Lyonel Vane
Baron Inglewood, 1964
Henry Cecil Vane; 1882–1917	Christopher William Vane; 1888–1964; 10th Baron Barnard	William Morgan Fletcher-Vane; 1909–1989; 1st Baron Inglewood
Harry John Neville Vane; 1923–2016; 11th Baron Barnard
Henry Francis Cecil Vane b. 1959; 12th Baron Barnard	William Richard Fletcher-Vane b. 1951; 2nd Baron Inglewood
William Henry Cecil Vane b. 2005	Henry William Frederick Fletcher-Vane b. 1990

== In fiction ==
The Earl of Darlington was a character in Kazuo Ishiguro's novel The Remains of the Day. The novel was adapted into a 1993 film by Merchant Ivory Productions starring Anthony Hopkins as Stevens and Emma Thompson as Miss Kenton. Lord Darlington was played by James Fox.
