= Duke of Southampton =

English noble title

Arms of Charles FitzRoy: The royal arms of King Charles II overall a bend sinister ermine

Duke of Southampton was a title in the Peerage of England. It was created in 1675 for Charles FitzRoy, an illegitimate son of King Charles II by his mistress, the 1st Duchess of Cleveland. Together with the dukedom, Charles Fitzroy also received the subsidiary titles of Earl of Chichester and Baron Newbury.

Upon his mother's death in 1709, the 1st Duke of Southampton succeeded to her hereditary peerages (the dukedom of Cleveland, earldom of Southampton and barony of Nonsuch). At his death in 1730, the titles passed to his son William. The 2nd Duke of Southampton died without issue, so the titles became extinct upon his death in 1774.

== Dukes of Southampton (1675) ==
- Charles FitzRoy, 1st Duke of Southampton, 2nd Duke of Cleveland (1662–1730)
- William FitzRoy, 2nd Duke of Southampton, 3rd Duke of Cleveland (1698–1774)

== Family tree ==
Family trees of the Dukes of Cleveland, Dukes of Southampton, and Earls of Darlington, Barons Barnard, and subsidiary titles

Duke of Cleveland (1st creation), Earl of Southampton, Baron of Nonsuch, 1670	Baron Barnard, of Barnard Castle in the Bishopric of Durham
Barbara Palmer; 1640–1709; 1st Duchess of Cleveland, Countess of Southampton, and Baroness Nonsuch	King Charles II; 1630–1685	Christopher Vane; 1653–1723; 1st Baron Barnard	Ernest Augustus; 1629–1698; Elector of Hanover
Duke of Southampton, Earl of Chichester (2nd creation), and Baron Newbury, 1675	Earl of Darlington (1st creation) and Baron of Brentford, 1722
Charles FitzRoy; 1662–1730; 2nd Duke of Cleveland, Earl of Southampton, and Baron Nonsuch, 1st Duke of Southampton, Earl of Chichester, and Baron Newbury	Henry Vane; 1676–1676	Gilbert Vane; 1678–1753; 2nd Baron Barnard	King George I 1660–1727	Sophia von Kielmansegg; 1675–1725; Countess of Leinster, Countess of Darlington and Baroness of Brentford
Earldom of Darlington (1st creation) and Barony of Brentford extinct, 1725
Earl of Darlington (2nd creation) and Viscount Barnard, 1754
William FitzRoy; 1698–1774; 3rd Duke of Cleveland, Earl of Southampton, and Baron Nonsuch, 2nd Duke of Southampton, Earl of Chichester, and Baron Newbury	Grace Fitzroy; 1697–1763	Henry Vane c. 1705–1758; 1st Earl of Darlington and Viscount Barnard, 3rd Baron Barnard	Morgan Vane; 1706–1779
Dukedoms of Cleveland (1st creation) and Southampton, and Marquess of Cleveland extinct, 1774
Henry Vane; 1726–1792; 2nd Earl of Darlington and Viscount Barnard, 4th Baron Barnard	Frederick Vane; 1732–1801	Raby Vane; 1736–1769	Morgan Vane; 1737–1789
Marquess of Cleveland, 1827; Duke of Cleveland (2nd creation) and Baron Raby (2nd creation), 1833
William Harry Vane; 1766–1842; 1st Duke of Cleveland, Marquess of Cleveland, and Baron Raby, 3rd Earl of Darlington and Viscount Barnard, 5th Baron Barnard	John Vane; 1788–1849
Henry Vane; 1788–1864; 2nd Duke of Cleveland, Marquess of Cleveland, and Baron Raby, 4th Earl of Darlington and Viscount Barnard, 6th Baron Barnard	William John Frederick Vane; 1792–1864; 3rd Duke of Cleveland, Marquess of Cleveland, and Baron Raby, 5th Earl of Darlington and Viscount Barnard, 7th Baron Barnard	Harry George Powlett; 1803–1891; 4th Duke of Cleveland, Marquess of Cleveland, and Baron Raby, 6th Earl of Darlington and Viscount Barnard, 8th Baron Barnard	Henry Morgan Vane; 1808–1886
Dukedom of Cleveland (2nd creation), Marquessate of Cleveland, Earldom of Darlington (2nd creation), Viscount Barnard, and Barony Raby (2nd creation) declared extinct, 1891
Henry de Vere Vane; 1854–1918; 9th Baron Barnard
Henry Cecil Vane; 1882–1917	Christopher William Vane; 1888–1964; 10th Baron Barnard
Harry John Neville Vane; 1923–2016; 11th Baron Barnard
Henry Francis Cecil Vane b. 1959; 12th Baron Barnard
Henry Vane b. 1990

== See also ==
- Duke of Cleveland
- Baron Southampton
