= Duke of Cleveland =

English and British peerage titles

Dukedom of Cleveland
- Blazon Arms: Quarterly: 1st and 4th Grand-Quarters, Sable, three Swords in pile points downwards proper (Powlett); 2nd Grand-Quarters, Azure, three sinister Gaunlets Or (Vane); 3rd Grand-Quarters, grand-quarterly, 1st & 4th, Azure, three Fleurs-de-lis Or (France); 2nd & 3rd, Gules, three Lions Or, armed and langued Azure (England); 2nd grand-quarter, Or, a Lion rampant Gules, within a Double-Tressure flory counter-flory Gules (Scotland); 3rd grand-quarter, Azure, a Harp Or, stringed Argent (Ireland); charged at the centre point with a Baton Sinister Ermine (FitzRoy). Crests: 1st: a Dexter Gauntlet proper, bossed and rimmed Or, brandishing a Sword proper (Vane); 2nd: On a Chapeau Gules, turned up Ermine, a Lion passant guardant Or, gorged with a Collar compony Ermine and Azure, and crowned with a Ducal Coronet Gold (FitzRoy). Supporters: Dexter: A Lion Guardant Or, ducally crowned Azure, and gorged with a Collar compony Ermine and Azure. The 4th Duke’s arms are surrounded by the circlet of the Order of the Garter
- Creation date: 29 January 1833
- Creation: Second
- Created by: King William IV
- Peerage: Peerage of the United Kingdom
- First holder: William Vane, 1st Marquess of Cleveland
- Last holder: Harry George Powlett, 4th Duke of Cleveland
- Remainder to: 1st Duke's heirs male of the body lawfully begotten
- Subsidiary titles: Marquess of Cleveland; Earl of Darlington; Earl of Chichester; Viscount Barnard; Baron Barnard; Baron Raby; Baron Newbury
- Status: Extinct
- Extinction date: 21 August 1891
- Motto: NEC TEMERE NEC TIMERE (Neither rashly nor timidly)

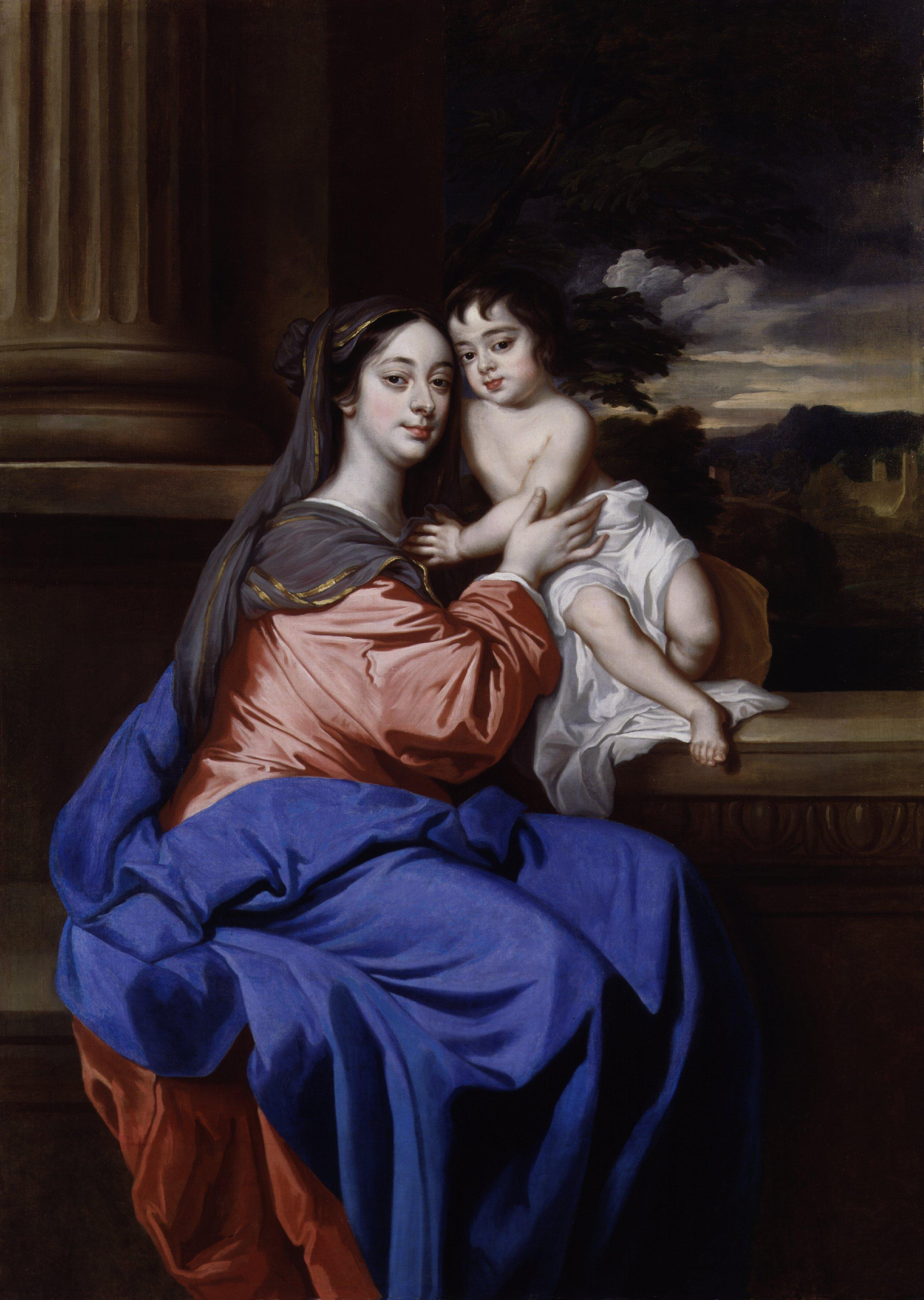
Barbara Palmer, 1st Duchess of Cleveland, and her son Charles FitzRoy, 2nd Duke of Cleveland

Duke of Cleveland is an extinct title that was created twice, once in the Peerage of England and once in the Peerage of the United Kingdom. The dukedoms were named after Cleveland in northern England.

== History ==
The first creation in 1670 (along with the barony of Nonsuch and the earldom of Southampton) was for Barbara Castlemaine, a mistress of King Charles II. The dukedom was created with a special remainder allowing it to be inherited by her first son, Charles, and his heirs male, then by her third son, George, 1st Duke of Northumberland, both being her illegitimate sons by Charles II. Charles was created Duke of Southampton in his own right in 1675 and inherited the dukedom of Cleveland after his mother's death in 1709. His son William inherited both dukedoms in 1730 but died without heirs male in 1774. As there were no heirs male descended from George, 1st Duke of Northumberland and the 1st Duchess of Cleveland's second son (Henry, 1st Duke of Grafton)'s heirs male had not been made eligible to inherit the dukedom of Cleveland, the title became extinct.

The dukedom of Cleveland was created again on 29 January 1833 for William Vane, 3rd Earl of Darlington, along with the title Baron Raby. He was a great-grandson of Charles FitzRoy, 2nd Duke of Cleveland of the first creation, and had already been created Marquess of Cleveland on 5 October 1827.

== Dukes of Cleveland, first creation (1670) ==
The Dukes also held the titles of Earl of Southampton and Baron Nonsuch, in the County of Surrey, created at the same time as the dukedom. The second and third Dukes also held the titles of Duke of Southampton, Earl of Chichester and Baron of Newbury, in the County of Berkshire (created 1675).

- Barbara Palmer, 1st Duchess of Cleveland (1641–1709), a mistress of Charles II
- Charles FitzRoy, 2nd Duke of Cleveland, 1st Duke of Southampton (1662–1730), eldest (illegitimate) son of the 1st Duchess of Cleveland and Charles II
- William FitzRoy, 3rd Duke of Cleveland, 2nd Duke of Southampton (1698–1774), eldest son of the 2nd Duke of Cleveland.

== Dukes of Cleveland, second creation (1833) ==
Arms of Vane: Azure, three sinister gauntlets (appaumée) or. These are a difference of the arms of the Fane family, Earls of Westmorland from 1624, which show: three dexter gauntlets back affrontée, with identical tinctures

Other titles held by these Dukes include Marquess of Cleveland (1827), Earl of Darlington, in the County of Durham and Viscount Barnard, of Barnard's Castle in the county of Durham (1754), Baron Barnard, of Barnard's Castle in the Bishopric of Durham (1698), and Baron Raby, of Raby Castle in the County Durham (1833).

- William Harry Vane, 1st Duke of Cleveland (1766–1842), great-grandson of the above 2nd Duke
- Henry Vane, 2nd Duke of Cleveland (1788–1864), eldest son of the 1st Duke
- William John Frederick Vane, 3rd Duke of Cleveland (1792–1864), second son of the 1st Duke
- Harry George Powlett, 4th Duke of Cleveland (1803–1891), youngest son of the 1st Duke.

== Family tree ==
Family trees of the Dukes of Cleveland, Dukes of Southampton, and Earls of Darlington, Barons Barnard, and subsidiary titles

Duke of Cleveland (1st creation), Earl of Southampton, Baron of Nonsuch, 1670	Baron Barnard, of Barnard Castle in the Bishopric of Durham
Barbara Palmer; 1640–1709; 1st Duchess of Cleveland, etc.	King Charles II; 1630–1685	Christopher Vane; 1653–1723; 1st Baron Barnard	Ernest Augustus; 1629–1698; Elector of Hanover
Duke of Southampton, Earl of Chichester (2nd creation), and Baron Newbury, 1675	Earl of Darlington (1st creation) and Baron of Brentford, 1722	Viscount Vane and Baron Vane of Dungannon in the County of Tyrone, 1720
Charles FitzRoy; 1662–1730; 2nd Duke of Cleveland, etc., 1st Duke of Southampton, etc.	Henry Vane; 1676–1676	Gilbert Vane; 1678–1753; 2nd Baron Barnard	King George I 1660–1727	Sophia von Kielmansegg; 1675–1725; Countess of Leinster, Countess of Darlington and Baroness of Brentford	William Vane; 1682–1734; 1st Viscount Vane
Earldom of Darlington (1st creation) and Barony of Brentford extinct, 1725
Earl of Darlington (2nd creation) and Viscount Barnard, 1754
William FitzRoy; 1698–1774; 3rd Duke of Cleveland, etc., 2nd Duke of Southampton, etc.	Grace Fitzroy; 1697–1763	Henry Vane c. 1705–1758; 1st Earl of Darlington, etc., 3rd Baron Barnard	Morgan Vane; 1706–1779	William Holles Vane; 1714–1789; 2nd Viscount Vane
Dukedoms of Cleveland (1st creation) and Southampton, and Marquess of Cleveland extinct, 1774	Viscouncy Vane and Barony Vane extinct, 1789
Henry Vane; 1726–1792; 2nd Earl of Darlington, etc., 4th Baron Barnard	Frederick Vane; 1732–1801	Raby Vane; 1736–1769	Morgan Vane; 1737–1789
Marquess of Cleveland, 1827; Duke of Cleveland (2nd creation) and Baron Raby (2nd creation), 1833
William Harry Vane; 1766–1842; 1st Duke of Cleveland, etc., 3rd Earl of Darlington, etc., 5th Baron Barnard	John Vane; 1788–1849
Henry Vane; 1788–1864; 2nd Duke of Cleveland, etc., 4th Earl of Darlington, etc., 6th Baron Barnard	William John Frederick Vane; 1792–1864; 3rd Duke of Cleveland, etc., 5th Earl of Darlington, etc., 7th Baron Barnard	Harry George Powlett; 1803–1891; 4th Duke of Cleveland, etc., 6th Earl of Darlington, etc., 8th Baron Barnard	Henry Morgan Vane; 1808–1886
Dukedom of Cleveland (2nd creation), Marquessate of Cleveland, Earldom of Darlington (2nd creation), Viscount Barnard, and Barony Raby (2nd creation) declared extinct, 1891
Henry de Vere Vane; 1854–1918; 9th Baron Barnard	William Lyonel Vane
Baron Inglewood, 1964
Henry Cecil Vane; 1882–1917	Christopher William Vane; 1888–1964; 10th Baron Barnard	William Morgan Fletcher-Vane; 1909–1989; 1st Baron Inglewood
Harry John Neville Vane; 1923–2016; 11th Baron Barnard
Henry Francis Cecil Vane b. 1959; 12th Baron Barnard	William Richard Fletcher-Vane b. 1951; 2nd Baron Inglewood
William Henry Cecil Vane b. 2005	Henry William Frederick Fletcher-Vane b. 1990
