= Baron Barnard =

Barony in the Peerage of England

Arms of Vane: Azure, three sinister gauntlets (appaumée) or These are a difference of the arms of the Fane family, Earls of Westmorland from 1624, which show: three dexter gauntlets back affrontée, with identical tinctures

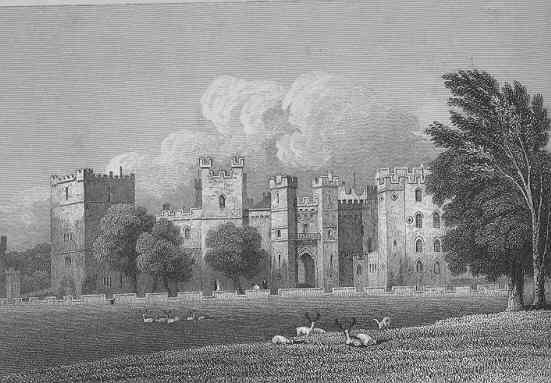
Raby Castle, the seat of the Vane family. From Jones' Views of the Seats of Noblemen and Gentlemen (1819).

Baron Barnard, of Barnard Castle in the Bishopric of Durham, is a title in the Peerage of England. It was created in 1698 for Christopher Vane, who had previously served as a member of parliament for County Durham and Boroughbridge. Vane was the son of Sir Henry Vane the Younger and grandson of Sir Henry Vane the Elder. His grandson, the third Baron, notably served as Paymaster of the Forces and as Lord Lieutenant of County Durham. In 1754 he was created Viscount Barnard (of Barnard Castle) and Earl of Darlington, both in the County Palatine of Durham. Lord Darlington was the husband of Lady Grace FitzRoy, daughter of Charles FitzRoy, 2nd Duke of Cleveland, the illegitimate son of King Charles II by his mistress Barbara Villiers, 1st Duchess of Cleveland.

== Succession ==
He was succeeded by his son, the second Earl. He sat as a member of parliament for Downton and County Durham and served as Lord Lieutenant of County Durham. On his death the titles passed to his son, the third Earl. He represented Totnes and Winchelsea in Parliament and served as Lord Lieutenant of County Durham. In 1827 the Cleveland title held by his great-grandmother was recreated when he was made Marquess of Cleveland, and in 1833 the dukedom of Cleveland was also revived when he was created Baron Raby, of Raby Castle in the County of Durham, and Duke of Cleveland. In 1839 the Duke was given the additional honour of being made a Knight of the Garter.

He was succeeded by his eldest son, the second Duke. He was a general in the army and also sat as a Whig Member of Parliament for County Durham, Winchilsea and Totnes and as a Tory for Saltash and South Shropshire. When he died the titles passed to his younger brother, the third Duke. He represented Winchelsea and County Durham in the House of Commons as a Whig and St Ives and Ludlow as a Tory. In 1813 he assumed by Royal Licence his mother's maiden name of Powlett but in 1864, on succeeding to the dukedom, he resumed by Royal Licence his patronymic Vane. He was childless and was succeeded by his younger brother, the fourth Duke. He was in the Diplomatic Service and also a Liberal Member of Parliament for South Durham and Hastings. In 1864 he assumed by Royal Licence his mother's maiden surname of Powlett in lieu of Vane. Like his two elder brothers he was childless and on his death 1891 the barony of Raby, the viscountcy, earldom, marquessate and dukedom became extinct,

However, he was succeeded in the barony of Barnard, according to a decision by the Committee for Privileges of the House of Lords in 1892, by his distant relative Henry de Vere Vane, who became the ninth Baron. He was the great-great-grandson of Morgan Vane, younger son of the second Baron. His second son, the tenth Baron, was Lord Lieutenant of County Durham. The latter's son, the eleventh Baron, succeeded in 1964 and served as Lord-Lieutenant of County Durham from 1970 to 1988. As of 2017 the title is held by the latter's son, the twelfth Baron.

Two other members of the Vane family have been elevated to the peerage. William Vane, younger son of the first Baron Barnard, was made Viscount Vane in the Peerage of Ireland in 1720 (see this title for more information).

William Vane, nephew of the ninth Baron, was created Baron Inglewood in the Peerage of the United Kingdom in 1964 (see this title for more information).

The family seat is Raby Castle, near Staindrop, County Durham.

== Baron Barnard (1698) ==
- Christopher Vane, 1st Baron Barnard (1653–1723)
- Gilbert Vane, 2nd Baron Barnard (1678–1753)
- Henry Vane, 3rd Baron Barnard (c. 1705–1758) (created Earl of Darlington in 1754)

=== Earl of Darlington (1754) ===
- Henry Vane, 1st Earl of Darlington, 3rd Baron Barnard (c. 1705–1758)
- Henry Vane, 2nd Earl of Darlington, 4th Baron Barnard (1726–1792)
- William Henry Vane, 3rd Earl of Darlington, 5th Baron Barnard (1766–1842) (created Marquess of Cleveland in 1827)

=== Marquess of Cleveland (1827) ===
- William Henry Vane, 1st Marquess of Cleveland, 5th Baron Barnard (1766–1842) (created Baron Raby and Duke of Cleveland in 1833)

=== Dukes of Cleveland (1833) ===
- William Henry Vane, 1st Duke of Cleveland, 5th Baron Barnard (1766–1842)
- Henry Vane, 2nd Duke of Cleveland, 6th Baron Barnard (1788–1864)
- William John Frederick Vane, 3rd Duke of Cleveland, 7th Baron Barnard (1792–1864)
- Harry George Powlett, 4th Duke of Cleveland, 8th Baron Barnard (1803–1891)

=== Baron Barnard (1698; reverted) ===
- Henry de Vere Vane, 9th Baron Barnard (1854–1918) (claim admitted 1892)
  - Henry Cecil Vane (1882–1917)
- Christopher William Vane, 10th Baron Barnard (1888–1964)
- (Harry) John Neville Vane, 11th Baron Barnard (1923–2016)
- Henry Francis Cecil Vane, 12th Baron Barnard (born 1959)

The heir apparent is the present holder's son, William Henry Cecil Vane (born 2005).

== Family tree ==
Family trees of the: Dukes of Cleveland, Dukes of Southampton, and Earls of Darlington, Barons Barnard, and subsidiary titles

Duke of Cleveland (1st creation), Earl of Southampton, Baron of Nonsuch, 1670 | Baron Barnard, of Barnard Castle in the Bishopric of Durham
Barbara Palmer; 1640–1709; 1st Duchess of Cleveland, Countess of Southampton, and Baroness Nonsuch | King Charles II; 1630–1685 | Christopher Vane; 1653–1723; 1st Baron Barnard | Ernest Augustus; 1629–1698; Elector of Hanover
Duke of Southampton, Earl of Chichester (2nd creation), and Baron Newbury, 1675 | Earl of Darlington (1st creation) and Viscount Barnard, 1722
Charles FitzRoy; 1662–1730; 2nd Duke of Cleveland, Earl of Southampton, and Baron Nonsuch, 1st Duke of Southampton, Earl of Chichester, and Baron Newbury | Henry Vane; 1676–1676 | Gilbert Vane; 1678–1753; 2nd Baron Barnard | King George I 1660–1727 | Sophia von Kielmansegg; 1675–1725; Countess of Darlington, Countess of Leinster
Earldom of Darlington (1st creation) extinct, 1725
Earl of Darlington (2nd creation), 1754
William FitzRoy; 1698–1774; 3rd Duke of Cleveland, Earl of Southampton, and Baron Nonsuch, 2nd Duke of Southampton, Earl of Chichester, and Baron Newbury | Grace Fitzroy; 1697–1763 | Henry Vane c. 1705–1758; 1st Earl of Darlington; 3rd Baron Barnard | Morgan Vane; 1706–1779
Dukedoms of Cleveland (1st creation) and Southampton, and Marquess of Cleveland extinct, 1774
Henry Vane; 1726–1792; 2nd Earl of Darlington; 4th Baron Barnard | Frederick Vane; 1732–1801 | Raby Vane; 1736–1769 | Morgan Vane; 1737–1789
Marquess of Cleveland, 1827; Duke of Cleveland (2nd creation) and Baron Raby of Raby Castle in the County of Durham, 1833
William Harry Vane; 1766–1842; 1st Duke of Cleveland and Marquess of Cleveland, 3rd Earl of Darlington; 5th Baron Barnard | John Vane; 1788–1849
Henry Vane; 1788–1864; 2nd Duke of Cleveland and Marquess of Cleveland, 4th Earl of Darlington; 6th Baron Barnard | William John Frederick Vane; 1792–1864; 3rd Duke of Cleveland and Marquess of Cleveland, 5th Earl of Darlington; 7th Baron Barnard | Harry George Powlett; 1803–1891; 4th Duke of Cleveland and Marquess of Cleveland, 6th Earl of Darlington; 8th Baron Barnard | Henry Vane; 1808–1886
Dukedom of Cleveland (2nd creation), marquessate of Cleveland, and earldom of Darlington (2nd creation) declared extinct, 1891
Henry Vane; 1854–1918; 9th Baron Barnard
Henry Vane; 1882–1917 | Christopher Vane; 1888–1964; 10th Baron Barnard
Christopher Vane; 1923–2016; 11th Baron Barnard
Henry Vane b. 1959; 12th Baron Barnard
Henry Vane b. 1990

== Line of succession ==
- Christopher Vane, 1st Baron Barnard (1653–1723)
  - Gilbert Vane, 2nd Baron Barnard (1678–1753)
    - Henry Vane, 1st Earl of Darlington (c. 1705 – 1758)
      - Henry Vane, 2nd Earl of Darlington (1726–1792)
        - William Henry Vane, 1st Duke of Cleveland (1766–1842)
          - Gen. Henry Vane, 2nd Duke of Cleveland (1788–1864)
          - William John Frederick Vane, 3rd Duke of Cleveland (1792–1864)
          - Harry George Powlett, 4th Duke of Cleveland (1803–1891)
    - Hon. Morgan Vane (c. 1706 – 1779)
      - Morgan Vane (1737–1789)
        - John Henry Vane (1788–1849)
          - Sir Henry Morgan Vane (1808–1886)
            - Henry de Vere Vane, 9th Baron Barnard (1854–1918)
              - Christopher William Vane, 10th Baron Barnard (1888–1964)
                - (Harry) John Neville Vane, 11th Baron Barnard (1923–2016)
                  - Henry Francis Cecil Vane, 12th Baron Barnard (born 1959)
                    - (1) Hon. William Henry Cecil Vane (born 2005)
            - Lt.-Col. William Lyonel Vane (1859–1920)
              - William Morgan Fletcher-Vane, 1st Baron Inglewood (1909–1989)
                - (2) William Richard Fletcher-Vane, 2nd Baron Inglewood (born 1951)
                  - (1, 3) Hon. Henry William Frederick Fletcher-Vane (born 1990)
                - (2, 4) Hon. Christopher John Fletcher-Vane (born 1953)
                  - (3, 5) Francis William Paul Fletcher-Vane (born 1992)
                  - (4, 6) Arthur Wladek Jocelyn Fletcher-Vane (born 1995)

== See also ==
- Duke of Cleveland
- Viscount Vane
- Baron Inglewood
- Vane-Tempest baronets
