= Henry Vane =

Henry Vane is the name of:

- Sir Henry Vane the Elder (1589–1655), English courtier, father of Henry Vane the Younger
- Sir Henry Vane the Younger (1613–1662), statesman, Puritan, Governor of Massachusetts Bay, son of Henry Vane the Elder
- Henry Vane, 1st Earl of Darlington (1705–1758), PC (c. )
- Henry Vane, 2nd Earl of Darlington (1726–1792), British peer
- Henry Vane, 2nd Duke of Cleveland (1788–1864), British peer, politician and army officer
- Henry Vane, 9th Baron Barnard (1854–1918), British peer and Senior Freemason
- Henry Vane, 12th Baron Barnard (born 1959)
- John Vane, 11th Baron Barnard (1923–2016), full name Harry John Vane
- Henry Cecil Vane (1882–1917), son and heir apparent of Henry Vane, 9th Baron Barnard of Raby Castle

== See also ==
- Vane (surname)
- Sir Henry Vane-Tempest, 2nd Baronet (1771–1813), British politician, born Henry Vane
