= William Vane =

William Vane may refer to:

- William Vane, 1st Viscount Vane (1682–1734), British peer
- William Vane, 2nd Viscount Vane (1714–1789), British peer
- William Vane, 1st Duke of Cleveland (1766–1842), British peer
- William Vane, 3rd Duke of Cleveland (1792–1864), British peer
- William Vane, 1st Baron Inglewood (1909–1989), British peer
