= Christopher Vane =

Christopher Vane may refer to:

- Christopher Vane, 1st Baron Barnard (1653–1723), English peer
- Christopher Vane, 10th Baron Barnard (1888–1964), British peer and military officer
- Christopher Vane (screenwriter), American television producer and writer
- Christopher Fletcher-Vane (born 1953), British officer of arms
