= Charles FitzRoy, 2nd Duke of Cleveland =

Son of Charles II of England (1662–1730)

His Grace The Duke of Cleveland KG
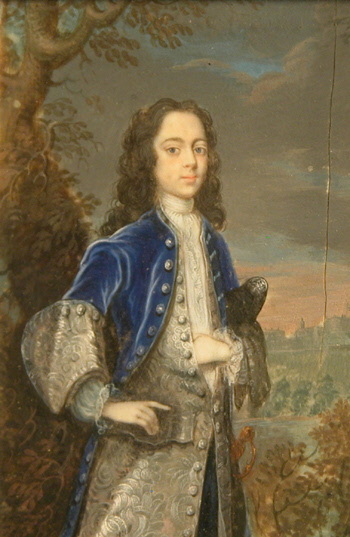
- Painting of Charles FitzRoy, Duke of Southampton and Cleveland, attributed to William Faithorne the Elder (c.1616–1691).
- Born: 18 June 1662
- Died: 9 September 1730 (aged 68)
- Spouses: Mary Wood; Anne Pulteney
- Issue Detail: 6, including: William FitzRoy, 3rd Duke of Cleveland
- Father: Charles II of England
- Mother: Barbara Palmer, 1st Duchess of Cleveland

Arms of Charles FitzRoy, 2nd Duke of Cleveland: The royal arms of King Charles II overall a baton sinister ermine

Charles Palmer, later Charles FitzRoy, 2nd Duke of Cleveland, 1st Duke of Southampton, Chief Butler of England (18 June 1662 – 9 September 1730) was an English nobleman and illegitimate son of King Charles II. He was styled Baron Limerick before 1670; Earl of Southampton between 1670 and 1675; and known as the Duke of Southampton from 1675 until 1709, when he succeeded his mother as Duke of Cleveland.

== Early life ==
Charles Palmer, later "FitzRoy", was born on 18 June 1662, and was initially claimed by Roger Palmer, 1st Earl of Castlemaine, his mother's husband, as his son and heir before being publicly acknowledged and invested by King Charles II of England as his son.

He was the third eldest of the illegitimate sons of Charles II, with his mother being Barbara Villiers, Countess of Castlemaine and later 1st Duchess of Cleveland, then the wife of Roger Palmer, 1st Earl of Castlemaine. In recognition of his legal father the Earl of Castlemaine, he was styled from birth by the courtesy title "Lord Limerick", one of the Earl's lesser titles. His birth marked the separation of his legal parents; Lord Castlemaine, a Roman Catholic, had him christened in the Roman Catholic faith, but six days later, the King had him re-christened in the Church of England as an Anglican and Protestant.

== Personal life ==
In 1670, at the age of 8, he was betrothed to Mary Wood, only child and sole heiress of Sir Henry Wood, 1st Baronet, Clerk of the Green Cloth, but with the proviso that the marriage be delayed until Mary was 16 years old. Following the death of her father, the Duchess of Cleveland more or less abducted Mary, with the intention of bringing her up with her own children. In 1675, he was created Duke of Southampton by King Charles II, along with the subsidiary titles of Earl of Chichester and Baron Newbury. The marriage to Mary Wood took place in 1679, but within months the new Duchess had died of smallpox, leaving no children of the marriage.

In 1694, the Duke remarried Anne Pulteney, a daughter of Sir William Pulteney, of Misterton, Leicestershire, and had issue:

- Lady Grace FitzRoy, Countess of Darlington, born 28 March 1697, married in 1725 Henry Vane, Earl of Darlington. They were the parents of Henry Vane, 2nd Earl of Darlington; Lady Anne Monson; Frederick Vane; and Raby Vane. Their grandson later became William Vane, 1st Duke of Cleveland.
- William FitzRoy, 3rd Duke of Cleveland and 2nd Duke of Southampton (19 February 1698 – 18 May 1774) no issue, the title went extinct.
- Lord Charles Fitzroy (13 February 1698 – 31 July 1723)
- Lord Henry Fitzroy (17 August 1701 – 1709)
- Lady Anne FitzRoy, (12 November 1702 – 13 February 1769), married John Paddey, Esq.
- Lady Barbara FitzRoy, died unmarried

On the death of his mother in 1709, the Duke became also second Duke of Cleveland, by a special remainder in the grant of the dukedom which set aside his illegitimacy.

He died on 9 September 1730 and was buried at Westminster Abbey. He was succeeded by his eldest son William FitzRoy (1698–1774), who died without issue, when all his titles became extinct.

== Coat of Arms ==
Coat of arms of Charles FitzRoy, 2nd Duke of Cleveland
Coronet A Coronet of a Duke Crest On a Chapeau Gules turned up Ermine a Lion statant guardant Or ducally crowned Azure and gorged with a Collar compony counter-compony ermine and Azure. Escutcheon The Royal Arms of King Charles II of England (viz. quarterly: 1st and 4th, France and England quarterly; 2nd, Scotland; 3rd, Ireland); the whole debruised by a Baton sinister ermine. Supporters Dexter: a Lion guardant Or ducally crowned Azure, gorged with a Collar compony counter-compony ermine and Azure. Sinister: A greyhound Argent, with a Collar compony counter-compony ermine and Azure. Motto Secundis Dubusque Rectus (Latin: "Upright in prosperity and in peril")

Peerage of England
Preceded by Barbara Palmer	Duke of Cleveland; 1st creation 1709–1730	Succeeded by William FitzRoy
New creation	Duke of Southampton; 1st creation 1675–1730	Succeeded by William FitzRoy
