= Viscount Vane =

Title in the peerage of Ireland

Viscount Vane was a title in the Peerage of Ireland. It was created in 1720 for the Honourable William Vane, who had previously represented County Durham in Parliament and who later sat for Steyning and Kent. He was created Baron Vane, of Dungannon in the County of Tyrone, also in the Peerage of Ireland, at the same time he was given the viscountcy. Vane was the younger son of Christopher Vane, 1st Baron Barnard (see Baron Barnard for earlier history of the family). The titles became extinct on the death of his only surviving son, the second Viscount, in 1789.

== Viscounts Vane (1720) ==
- William Vane, 1st Viscount Vane (1682–1734)
  - Hon. Christopher Vane (1704–1721)
  - Hon. John Vane (1707–1724)
- William Holles Vane, 2nd Viscount Vane (1714–1789)

== See also ==
- Baron Barnard
- Earl of Darlington
- Duke of Cleveland
- Baron Inglewood
