= William Fletcher-Vane, 1st Baron Inglewood =

British politician

The Right Honourable The Lord Inglewood TD
- Fletcher-Vane in 1949

Parliamentary Secretary to the Ministry of Agriculture, Fisheries and Food
- In office 28 October 1960 – 16 July 1962
- Prime Minister: Harold Macmillan
- Preceded by: Joseph Godber
- Succeeded by: James Scott-Hopkins

Parliamentary Secretary to the Minister for Pensions
- In office 14 April 1958 – 20 October 1960
- Prime Minister: Harold Macmillan
- Preceded by: Richard Wood
- Succeeded by: Patricia Hornsby-Smith

Member of the House of Lords
- Lord Temporal
- In office 30 June 1964 – 22 June 1989
- Preceded by: Peerage created
- Succeeded by: The 2nd Lord Inglewood

Member of Parliament for Westmorland
- In office 5 July 1945 – 30 June 1964
- Preceded by: Oliver Stanley
- Succeeded by: Michael Jopling

Personal details
- Born: William Morgan Vane; 12 April 1909
- Died: 22 June 1989 (aged 80)
- Party: Conservative
- Spouse: Mary Proby (after 1949)
- Children: Richard; Christopher
- Education: Charterhouse School; Trinity College, Cambridge

William Morgan Fletcher-Vane, 1st Baron Inglewood (12 April 1909 – 22 June 1989), was a British Conservative Party politician.

== Early life ==
Inglewood was the son of Lieutenant-Colonel the Hon. William Lyonel Vane, a descendant of Gilbert Vane, 2nd Baron Barnard. His uncle Henry Vane had succeeded as ninth Baron Barnard in 1891 on the death of his distant relative Harry Powlett, 4th Duke of Cleveland and 8th Baron Barnard. Inglewood's mother was Lady Katherine Louisa Pakenham, daughter of William Pakenham, 4th Earl of Longford (hence Frank Pakenham, 7th Earl of Longford, was his first cousin).

On 9 April 1931, shortly before his 22nd birthday, he assumed by deed poll the additional surname of Fletcher, and subsequently inherited the estates of Hutton that were then in the possession of the Fletcher-Vane baronets under the control of trustees. Inglewood was a distant cousin of the Fletcher-Vane baronets (they shared descent from Sir Henry Vane the Elder), but Sir Francis Fletcher-Vane, 5th and last of the Fletcher-Vane baronets of Hutton, was still alive in 1931 when Inglewood inherited. In 1883, the estate of the Fletcher-Vane baronets comprised some 7,194 acres. After a year of ill health, Sir Francis died in a nursing home in Lambeth in 1934. On his death, the Fletcher-Vane baronetcy became extinct.

He was educated at Charterhouse and at Trinity College, Cambridge.

== Career ==
Inglewood served in the Second World War in France and the Middle East as a Lieutenant-Colonel in the Durham Light Infantry, and was mentioned in despatches.

He was elected at the 1945 general election as Member of Parliament for Westmorland, and held the seat until his retirement from the House of Commons at the 1964 general election. He held ministerial office twice, in Anthony Eden and Harold Macmillan's 1957–1964 government: as Parliamentary Secretary to the Minister for Pensions from 1958 to 1960, and as Parliamentary Secretary to the Ministry of Agriculture, Fisheries and Food from 1960 to 1962. He was also Leader of the United Kingdom Delegation to the World Food Congress in Washington, D.C., in 1963.

On 30 June 1964, he was ennobled as Baron Inglewood, of Hutton in the Forest in the County of Cumberland.

== Personal life ==
Lord Inglewood married Mary Proby, daughter of Sir Richard Proby, 1st Baronet, in 1949. They had two sons.

He died in June 1989, aged 80, and was succeeded in the barony by his son Richard, who also became a Conservative politician. His second son, Christopher, a barrister, was Portcullis Pursuivant from 2012 to 2017, and Chester Herald from 2017 to 2023.

Parliament of the United Kingdom
Preceded by Oliver Stanley	Member of Parliament for Westmorland; 1945–1964	Succeeded by Michael Jopling
Political offices
Preceded by Edith Pitt; Richard Wood	Parliamentary Secretary to the Minister for Pensions; 1958–1960; With: Edith Pitt (until 1959); Patricia Hornsby-Smith (from 1959)	Succeeded by Patricia Hornsby-Smith; Bernard Braine
Preceded by Joseph Godber; The Earl Waldegrave	Parliamentary Secretary to the Ministry of Agriculture, Fisheries and Food; 1960–1962; With: The Earl Waldegrave	Succeeded by James Scott-Hopkins; The Lord St Oswald
Peerage of the United Kingdom
New creation	Baron Inglewood; 1964–1989; Member of the House of Lords (1964–1989)	Succeeded by Richard Fletcher-Vane
