= Lord Lieutenant of Durham =

Monarch's representative in English county

This is a list of people who have served as Lord Lieutenant of Durham.

== Lord lieutenants ==
- Henry Neville, 5th Earl of Westmorland 1552–?
- Henry Hastings, 3rd Earl of Huntingdon 2 August 1586 – 1595
- vacant
- Robert Carr, 1st Earl of Somerset 4 February 1615 – 20 November 1617
- Richard Neile, Bishop of Durham 20 November 1617 – 10 December 1627
- vacant
- John Howson, Bishop of Durham 13 October 1628 – 6 February 1632
- Thomas Morton, Bishop of Durham 30 July 1632 – 1642
- Sir Henry Vane 1642 (Parliamentary)
- Interregnum
- Thomas Belasyse, 2nd Viscount Fauconberg 27 July 1660 – 1661
- John Cosin 13 September 1661 – 15 January 1672
- In commission 18 April 1672 – 19 November 1674
  - Charles Howard, 1st Earl of Carlisle
  - William Widdrington, 2nd Baron Widdrington
  - Edward Villiers
  - Sir Christopher Conyers, 2nd Baronet
  - Sir Ralph Cole, 2nd Baronet
  - Sir Gilbert Gerard, 1st Baronet
  - Sir George Vane
  - Sir James Clavering, 1st Baronet
  - Henry Lambton
  - John Tempest
  - William Blakeston
  - Cuthbert Carre
  - Ralph Davison
  - Sir Francis Bowes
- Nathaniel Crew, 3rd Baron Crew, Bishop of Durham 19 November 1674 – 1689
- Richard Lumley, 1st Earl of Scarbrough 27 February 1690 – 1712
- Nathaniel Crew, 3rd Baron Crew, Bishop of Durham 8 May 1712 – 1714
- Richard Lumley, 1st Earl of Scarbrough 16 December 1714 – 17 December 1721
- William Talbot, Bishop of Durham 10 January 1722 – 10 October 1730
- Edward Chandler, Bishop of Durham 11 December 1730 – 20 July 1750
- vacant
- Henry Vane, 1st Earl of Darlington 21 March 1753 – 6 March 1758
- Henry Vane, 2nd Earl of Darlington 11 July 1758 – 8 September 1792
- William Vane, 1st Duke of Cleveland 26 November 1792 – 29 January 1842
- Charles William Vane, 3rd Marquess of Londonderry 7 April 1842 – 6 March 1854
- George Lambton, 2nd Earl of Durham 31 March 1854 – 27 November 1879
- George Vane-Tempest, 5th Marquess of Londonderry 15 January 1880 – 6 November 1884
- John Lambton, 3rd Earl of Durham 2 December 1884 – 18 September 1928
- Charles Stewart Henry Vane-Tempest-Stewart, 7th Marquess of Londonderry 14 June 1928 – 1949
- John Lawson, 1st Baron Lawson 28 April 1949 – 1958
- Christopher Vane, 10th Baron Barnard 20 October 1958 – 19 October 1964
- Sir James Fitzjames Duff 18 February 1964 – 24 April 1970
- John Vane, 11th Baron Barnard 1 October 1970 – 21 April 1988
- David James Grant 21 April 1988 – 30 January 1997
- Sir Paul Nicholson KCVO 30 January 1997 – 7 March 2013
- Dame Susan Snowdon DCVO CStJ 8 March 2013 – 1 April 2026
- Michael Butterwick CBE 1 April 2026 - present

== Deputy lieutenants ==
A deputy lieutenant of Durham is commissioned by the Lord Lieutenant of Durham. Deputy lieutenants support the work of the lord-lieutenant. There can be several deputy lieutenants at any time, depending on the population of the county. Their appointment does not terminate with the changing of the lord-lieutenant, but they usually retire at age 75.

=== 19th century ===
- 11 April 1831: John Pratt
- 11 April 1831: Leonard Raisbeck
- 11 April 1831: Robert Appleby
- 11 April 1831: William Hodgson
- 11 April 1831: John Fawcett
- 11 April 1831: William Mills
- 11 April 1831: Thomas Greenwell
- 11 April 1831: George Townshend Fox
- 14 March 1848: Robert Duncombe Shafto

=== 21st century ===
- 18 June 2015: Dr Jon Levick
- 18 June 2015: Dame Maura Regan
- 18 June 2015: Derek Winter
- 18 June 2015: Lady Sarah Nicholson
