= Richard Fletcher-Vane, 2nd Baron Inglewood =

British politician (born 1951)

The Right Honourable The Lord Inglewood DL FSA
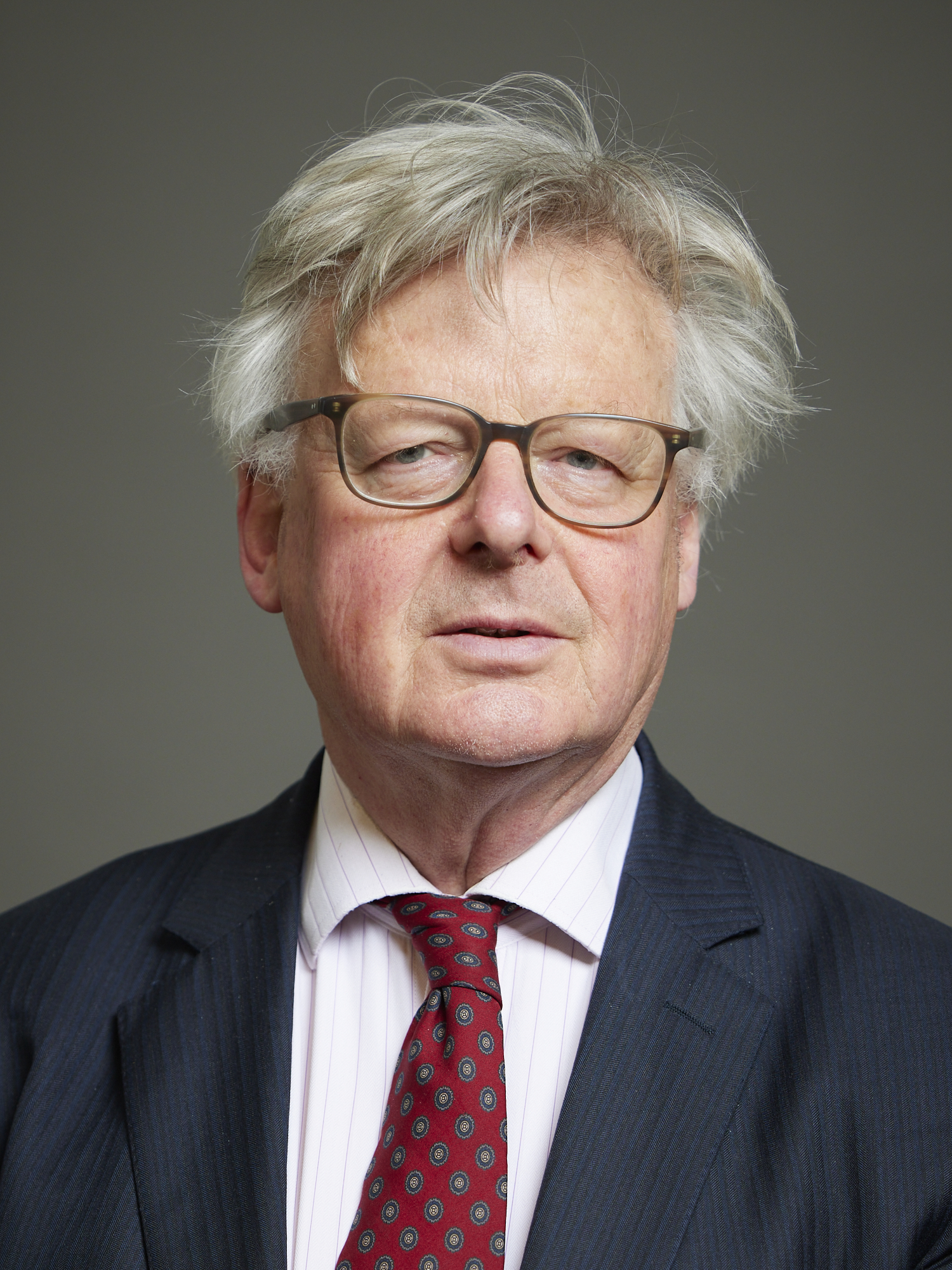
- Official portrait, 2023

Parliamentary Under-Secretary of State for Broadcasting and Tourism
- In office 8 July 1995 – 2 May 1997
- Prime Minister: John Major
- Preceded by: The Viscount Astor
- Succeeded by: Mark Fisher

Deputy Chief Whip of the House of Lords Captain of the Yeomen of the Guard
- In office 12 January 1995 – 8 July 1995
- Prime Minister: John Major
- Preceded by: The Earl of Arran
- Succeeded by: The Lord Chesham

Lord-in-waiting Government Whip
- In office 21 July 1994 – 12 January 1995
- Prime Minister: John Major
- Preceded by: The Lord Annaly
- Succeeded by: The Earl of Lindsay

Member of the European Parliament
- In office 10 June 1999 – 9 June 2004
- Preceded by: Constituency established
- Succeeded by: John Whittaker
- Constituency: North West England
- In office 15 June 1989 – 9 June 1994
- Preceded by: Sheila Faith
- Succeeded by: Tony Cunningham
- Constituency: Cumbria and Lancashire North

Member of the House of Lords
- Lord Temporal
- Hereditary peerage 23 November 1989 – 11 November 1999
- Preceded by: The 1st Baron Inglewood
- Succeeded by: Seat abolished
- Elected Hereditary Peer; 11 November 1999 – 29 April 2026
- Election: 1999
- Preceded by: Seat established
- Succeeded by: Seat abolished

Personal details
- Born: 31 July 1951 (age 75)
- Party: Crossbench (since 2025)
- Other political affiliations: Conservative Party (until 2018)
- Spouse: Cressida Pemberton-Pigott (m. 1986)
- Children: 3
- Parents: William Fletcher-Vane, 1st Baron Inglewood; Mary Proby

William Richard Fletcher-Vane, 2nd Baron Inglewood (born 31 July 1951), usually called Richard Inglewood, is a British politician. Lord Inglewood is a former member of the House of Lords, a barrister and a chartered surveyor. He was a Member of the European Parliament from 1989 to 2004, and a junior minister in the UK government from 1995 to 1997.

== Political career ==
At the 1983 general election, he stood as the Conservative candidate in the safe Labour constituency of Houghton and Washington, where he finished third with 24% of the votes.

At the 1984 European Parliament election he stood unsuccessfully in the Durham constituency, then at the 1989 election he was elected as Member of the European Parliament (MEP) for Cumbria and Lancashire North. He lost his seat at the 1994 election, but in 1999 was elected for the new North West England constituency. He was the Conservative spokesman on Legal Affairs. He did not contest the 2004 election.

He was a government whip in the Lords from 1994 to 1995, serving as Deputy Chief Whip from January to July 1995. He was then appointed as a junior minister in the Department of National Heritage, serving until the Conservatives lost office at the 1997 general election. During that time he was responsible for broadcasting and heritage, and was Minister for Tourism.

Between 2011 and 2014 he was Chairman of the House of Lords Select Committee on Communications, and 2014–2015 Chairman of the Select Committee on Extradition Law.

== Other interests ==
He was Chairman of the CN Group, an independent local media business based in Carlisle 2002–2016, Chairman of Carr's Milling Industries plc 2005–2013, and of the Reviewing Committee on the Export of Works of Art 2003–2014, Chairman of Gen2 from 2016 until 2018 and President of Cumbria Tourist Board 2004 to 2019. He was a visiting parliamentary fellow at St Antony's College Oxford 2014–2015, Chairman of the Cumbria Local Nature Partnership 2013–2017. Member Lake District Special Planning Board 1983–1989, Chairman of the Development Control (Planning Committee) of the Lake District National Park 1985–1989, Board Member North West Water Authority 1987–1989.

He has been a deputy lieutenant of Cumbria since 1993 and was appointed vice lord-lieutenant in 2013. In 2018 he became chairman of the Cumbria Local Enterprise Partnership. He is the current President of Cumbria Wildlife Trust and has been president of Historic Buildings and Places since 2015, president of the British Art Market Federation since 2014, president of the Uplands Alliance since 2015, patron of the Livestock Auctioneers Association since 2016, president of the National Sheep Association since 2017, a Fellow of the Society of Antiquaries of London (FSA) since 2002, and has been a director/trustee of Full Fact since 2014 and the Public Interest News Foundation since 2020.

Lord Inglewood is a Vice President of the National Churches Trust.

== Personal life ==
Inglewood is the eldest son of Conservative Member of Parliament William Fletcher-Vane and his wife Mary née Proby. Barrister Christopher Fletcher-Vane is his younger brother.

He was educated at Eton and at Trinity College, Cambridge, and was called to the bar at Lincoln's Inn in 1975. He married Cressida Pemberton-Pigott in 1986.

His home is Hutton-in-the-Forest in the Inglewood Forest area of Cumbria.

Political offices
Preceded by The Lord Annaly	Lord-in-waiting; 1994–1995	Succeeded by The Earl of Lindsay
Preceded by The Earl of Arran	Captain of the Yeomen of the Guard; 1995	Succeeded by The Lord Chesham
Peerage of the United Kingdom
Preceded by William Fletcher-Vane	Baron Inglewood; 1989–present Member of the House of Lords (1989–1999)	Incumbent; Heir apparent: Hon. Henry Fletcher-Vane
Parliament of the United Kingdom
New office created by the House of Lords Act 1999	Elected hereditary peer to the House of Lords under the House of Lords Act 1999; 1999–2026	Office abolished under the House of Lords (Hereditary Peers) Act 2026
