= Christopher Fletcher-Vane =

Christopher John Fletcher-Vane (born 27 March 1953) is a former officer of arms at the College of Arms in London. The second son of William Fletcher-Vane, 1st Baron Inglewood, he was for many years a barrister in Newcastle upon Tyne. He was appointed Portcullis Pursuivant of Arms in Ordinary in 2012, and Chester Herald of Arms in Ordinary in 2017. He took part in the royal procession at the coronation of Charles III in May 2023, and retired from the College of Arms in September 2023.

Coat of arms of Christopher Fletcher-Vane

Heraldic offices
Preceded by William Hunt	Portcullis Pursuivant; 2012–2017	Succeeded by Dominic Ingram
Preceded by Timothy Duke	Chester Herald; 2017–2023	Succeeded by Dominic Ingram
