= Harry Powlett, 4th Duke of Cleveland =

British politician (1803–1891)

His Grace The Duke of Cleveland KG
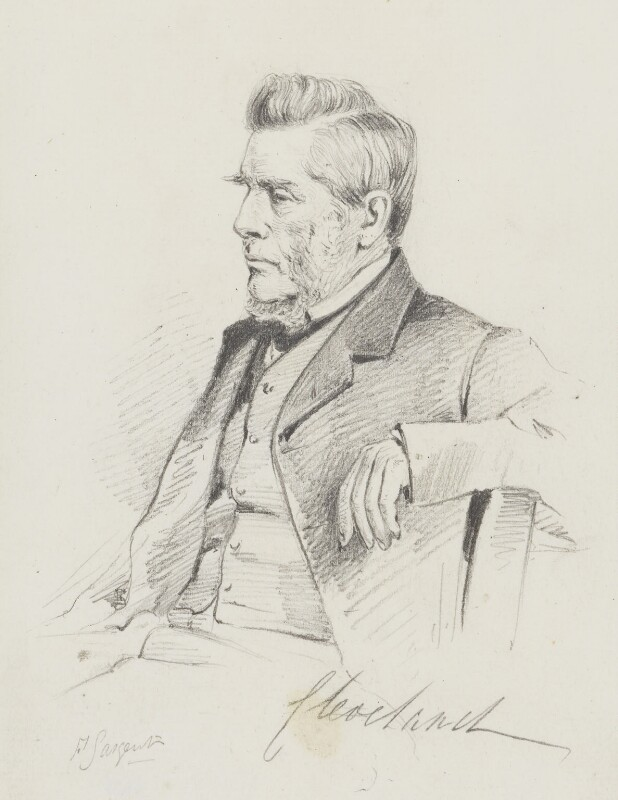

Personal details
- Born: 19 April 1803
- Died: 21 August 1891 (aged 88) Cleveland House, 16 St James's Square, Westminster, London
- Party: Whig, Liberal Party
- Spouse: Lady Wilhelmina Stanhope (m. 1854)
- Parent(s): William Vane, 1st Duke of Cleveland; Lady Catherine Powlett
- Education: Oriel College, Oxford

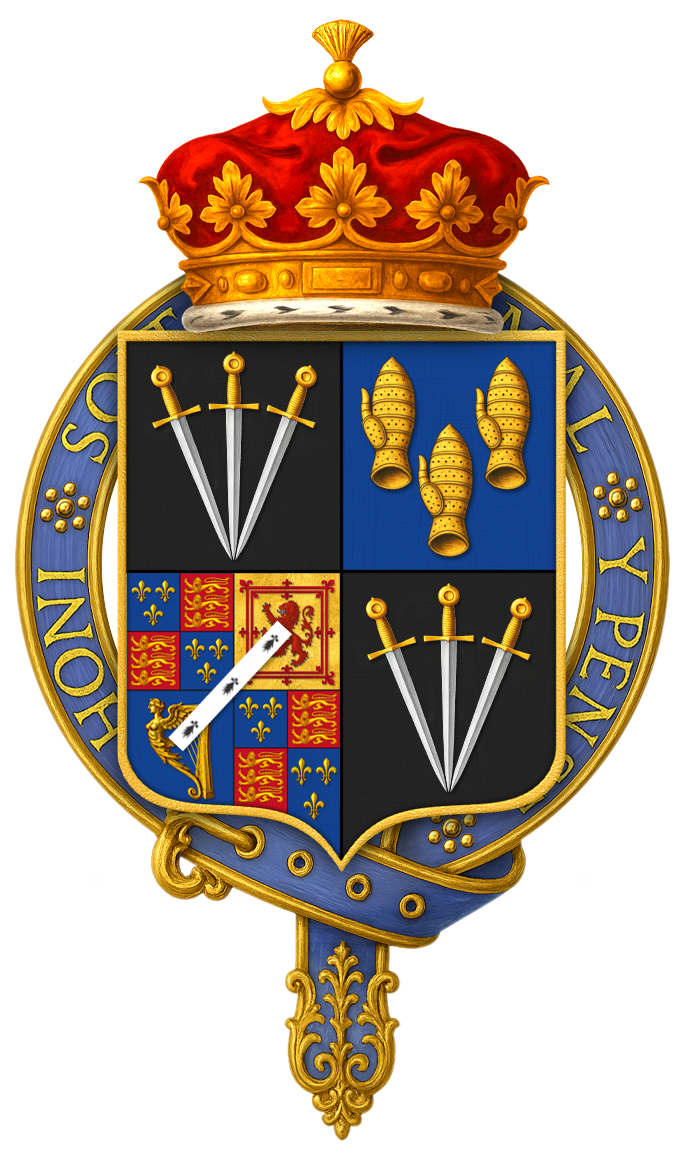
Quartered arms of Harry Powlett, 4th Duke of Cleveland, KG

Harry George Powlett, 4th Duke of Cleveland (19 April 1803 – 21 August 1891), styled The Honourable Harry Vane until 1827 and Lord Harry Vane from 1827 to 1864, who in 1864 adopted by Royal Licence the surname and arms of Powlett in lieu of Vane, was an English landowner, diplomat and Whig statesman. During the crisis which led to the collapse of Lord Russell's government in 1866 over the question of parliamentary reform, he was considered a possible compromise prime minister in a Whig-Conservative anti-reform coalition government, but such plans came to nothing.

== Origins ==
Vane was the third son of William Vane, 1st Duke of Cleveland (1766–1842), by his wife Lady Catherine Margaret Powlett, daughter of Admiral Harry Powlett, 6th Duke of Bolton (1720–1794). His elder brothers were Henry Vane, 2nd Duke of Cleveland (1788–1864), and William Vane, 3rd Duke of Cleveland (1792–1864).

== Career ==
Vane was educated at Oriel College, Oxford. He entered the foreign service and held posts in Paris and Stockholm before entering the House of Commons in 1841 as a member of parliament for South Durham, which seat he held until 1859, when he switched to Hastings, which he represented until his accession to the dukedom and elevation to the House of Lords on the death of his brother on 6 September 1864. On 18 November 1864 he adopted by Royal License the surname and arms of Powlett in lieu of his patronymic, in accordance with the will of his maternal grandmother the Duchess of Bolton (Katherine Lowther (d.1809), daughter of Robert Lowther, sister of James Lowther, 1st Earl of Lonsdale, and wife of the 6th Duke of Bolton). He was made a Knight of the Garter in 1865. During the crisis which led to the collapse in 1866 of Lord Russell's second ministry over the question of parliamentary reform, he was considered a possible compromise prime minister in a Whig-Conservative anti-reform coalition government, but such plans came to nothing. In 1867 he served as treasurer of the Salop Infirmary in Shrewsbury, and in 1885 financed the rebuilding of the parish church at Uppington, Shropshire where part of his estates were.

He owned 104,000 acres including 55,000 acres in Durham, 25,000 acres in Salop and 6,000 acres in Suffolk.

== Marriage ==
At Chevening on 2 August 1854, Vane married Lady Dalmeny (1819–1901), the daughter of Philip Henry Stanhope, 4th Earl Stanhope and widow of Archibald Primrose, Lord Dalmeny, by whom she was the mother of Archibald Primrose, 5th Earl of Rosebery, Prime Minister of the United Kingdom, who was seven years old at that time. The marriage was without issue.

== Death and succession ==
Cleveland died in August 1891, aged 88, at his London townhouse Cleveland House, 16 St James's Square, Westminster, London. Thereupon the line of succession to his peerages became unclear. In 1891 the Committee for Privileges and Conduct of the House of Lords declared the title of Duke of Cleveland extinct but declared Henry Vane to be the rightful heir of the title Baron Barnard and to the estates of Raby Castle and Barnard Castle, which latter had been purchased in 1626 by the Vane family.

Parliament of the United Kingdom
Preceded by John Bowes; Joseph Pease	Member of Parliament for South Durham; 1841–1859; With: John Bowes 1841–1847; James Farrer 1847–1857; Henry Pease 1857–1859	Succeeded by Henry Pease; James Farrer
Preceded by Frederick North; Patrick Robertson	Member of Parliament for Hastings; 1859–1864; With: Frederick North	Succeeded by Frederick North; George Waldegrave-Leslie
Peerage of the United Kingdom
Preceded by William Vane	Duke of Cleveland; 2nd creation 1864–1891	Extinct
Peerage of England
Preceded by William Vane	Baron Barnard; 1864–1891	Succeeded by Henry Vane
