= Henry Vane, 1st Earl of Darlington =

British politician

The Right Honourable The Earl of Darlington PC (Ire)
- Arms of Vane: Azure, three sinister gauntlets (appaumée) or These are a difference of the arms of the Fane family, Earls of Westmorland from 1624, which show: three dexter gauntlets back affrontée, with identical tinctures

Member of the Great Britain Parliament for Launceston
- In office 1726–1727 Serving with John Freind
- Preceded by: John Willes; John Freind
- Succeeded by: John King; Arthur Tremayne

Member of the Great Britain Parliament for St Mawes
- In office 1727–1741 Serving with: John Knight 1727–1728; William East 1728–1734; Richard Plumer 1734–1741
- Preceded by: Sidney Godolphin; Samuel Molyneux
- Succeeded by: Robert Nugent; James Douglas

Member of the Great Britain Parliament for Ripon
- In office 1741–1747 Serving with William Aislabie
- Preceded by: William Aislabie; Thomas Duncombe
- Succeeded by: William Aislabie; Sir Charles Vernon

Member of the Great Britain Parliament for County Durham
- In office 1747–1753 Serving with George Bowes
- Preceded by: John Hedworth; George Bowes
- Succeeded by: George Bowes; The Hon. Henry Vane

Personal details
- Born: c. 1705
- Died: 6 March 1758
- Party: Whig
- Spouse: Lady Grace Fitzroy
- Children: 7, including: Henry Vane, 2nd Earl of Darlington; Lady Anne Vane; Frederick Vane; Raby Vane

Henry Vane, 1st Earl of Darlington, PC (Ire) (c. 1705 – 6 March 1758), known as Lord Barnard between 1753 and 1754, was a British politician who sat in the House of Commons from 1726 to 1753 when he succeeded to a peerage as Baron Barnard.

== Life ==
Vane was the eldest son of Gilbert Vane, 2nd Baron Barnard, of Raby Castle, Staindrop, county Durham, and his wife, Mary Randyll, daughter of Morgan Randyll of Chilworth, Surrey. His sister Anne Vane was a mistress to Frederick, Prince of Wales. He was educated privately. He married Lady Grace Fitzroy, daughter of Charles FitzRoy, 2nd Duke of Cleveland, on 2 September 1725.

== Career ==
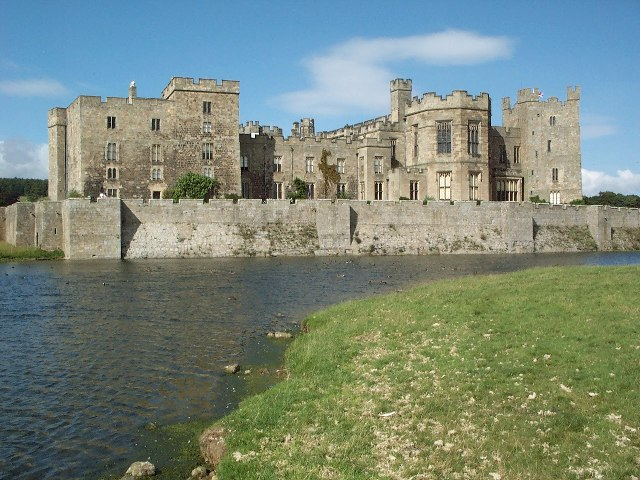
The south front of Raby Castle

Vane contested County Durham as a Whig on his family's interest at the 1722 British general election, but was unsuccessful. He was brought in by the ministry as Member of Parliament for Launceston at a by-election on 31 May 1726. At the 1727 British general election he planned to stand for county Durham, but stood down to avoid splitting the Whig vote, and the ministry found him another seat at St Mawes where he was returned as MP unopposed. He went into opposition, and attached himself to his wife's first cousin William Pulteney. He never spoke in the House, which was said to be because of 'a monstrous tongue which lolled out of his mouth'. He was returned again in a contest for St Mawes at the 1734 British general election, on the Boscawen interest, and, at the 1741 British general election, was returned unopposed as MP for Ripon on the Aislabie interest. In 1748, Vane also served as Mayor of Hartlepool.

After Walpole's fall in 1742, Pulteney procured for Vane a lucrative sinecure as Vice-Treasurer and Paymaster General of Ireland and he also became a Privy Counsellor (Ireland) in 1742. Vane lost his Irish post when Pulteney and his adherents were turned out in December 1744. He was finally returned for county Durham at the 1747 British general election as a government supporter. He became a follower of his kinsman, the Duke of Newcastle, cultivating him so assiduously that in 1749 he was appointed a Lord of the Treasury which he retained to 1755. On 27 April 1753 he succeeded to the peerage as 3rd Baron Barnard on the death of his father and became Lord Lieutenant of Durham from 1753 to 1758. He was rewarded by Newcastle with an earldom, as 1st Earl of Darlington and 1st Viscount Barnard on 3 April 1754 and held the post of Joint Paymaster of the Forces between 1755 and 1756.

== Death and legacy ==
Vane died on 6 March 1758. He was succeeded in his titles by his son Henry. With his wife Grace, he had seven children:

1. Lady Mary Vane
2. Henry Vane, 2nd Earl of Darlington, (1726 – 8 Sep 1792)
3. Lady Anne Vane, a botanist (25 June 1726 – 18 February 1776)
4. Hon. Frederick Vane, b. 26 June 1732
5. Hon. Charles Vane
6. Hon. Raby Vane (2 January 1736 – 23 October 1769)
7. Lady Harriet Vane (27 January 1739 – January 1759)

Parliament of Great Britain
| Preceded by John Willes; John Freind | Member of Parliament for Launceston; 1726–1727; With: John Freind | Succeeded by John King; Arthur Tremayne |
| Preceded by Sidney Godolphin; Samuel Molyneux | Member of Parliament for St Mawes; 1727–1741; With: John Knight 1727–1728; William East 1728–1734; Richard Plumer 1734–1741 | Succeeded by Robert Nugent; James Douglas |
| Preceded by William Aislabie; Thomas Duncombe | Member of Parliament for Ripon; 1741–1747; With: William Aislabie | Succeeded by William Aislabie; Sir Charles Vernon |
| Preceded by John Hedworth; George Bowes | Member of Parliament for County Durham; 1747–1753; With: George Bowes | Succeeded by George Bowes; The Hon. Henry Vane |
Honorary titles
| Vacant Title last held by The Bishop of Durham | Lord Lieutenant of Durham; 1753–1758 | Succeeded by The Earl of Darlington |
| Vacant Title last held by The Earl of Scarbrough | Vice-Admiral of Durham; 1755–1758 | Vacant Title next held by The Earl of Darlington |
Peerage of England
| Preceded by Gilbert Vane | Baron Barnard; 1753–1758 | Succeeded by Henry Vane |
Peerage of Great Britain
| New creation | Earl of Darlington; 1754–1758 | Succeeded by Henry Vane |
