= William Vane, 2nd Viscount Vane =

British Whig politician (1714–1789)

The Right Honourable The Viscount Vane

Personal details
- Born: 14 February 1714
- Died: 5 April 1789 (aged 75)
- Party: Whig
- Spouse: Lady William Hamilton (m. 1735; died 1788)
- Relations: Christopher Vane, 1st Baron Barnard (grandfather)
- Parent(s): William Vane, 1st Viscount Vane; Lucy Jolliffe
- Education: Christ Church, Oxford

William Holles Vane, 2nd Viscount Vane (14 February 1714 – 5 April 1789), was a British Whig politician. He is best remembered for his devotion to his openly unfaithful wife Frances, who despised him.

== Early life ==
William Holles Vane was the third son of William Vane, 1st Viscount Vane, and his wife Lucy (née Jolliffe). His paternal grandfather was Christopher Vane, 1st Baron Barnard and Lady Elizabeth Holles (a daughter of Gilbert Holles, 3rd Earl of Clare and sister of John Holles, 1st Duke of Newcastle).

He matriculated at Christ Church, Oxford, on 12 October 1730. His older brothers, Christopher and John, predeceased their father, and William succeeded to the viscountcy on 20 May 1734.

== Unconventional marriage ==
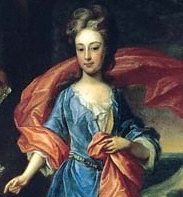
The Viscountess Vane

He married the widowed Lady William Hamilton in Marylebone on 19 May 1735. The marriage immediately proved to be a failure and the new Viscountess Vane tried to procure a legal separation. She did not hide her contempt for him or her extramarital relationships, but he was obsessed and remained devoted to her despite the social embarrassment brought to him by her continuous sexual infidelity and financial difficulties caused by her excessive spending. During their visit to Paris in 1736, she eloped with Sewallis Shirley, the sixth son of Robert Shirley, 1st Earl Ferrers. Lord Vane desperately tried to persuade her to return, employing about fifty people to search for her in August 1736 and promising a reward in the newspapers for any information about her location in January 1737. John Perceval, 1st Earl of Egmont, wrote:

One would think he had lost some favourite spaniel bitch... But the advertisement makes sport to the town. He is a very silly young man, half mad, half fool.

After Shirley left her, she took up a liaison with Augustus Berkeley, 4th Earl of Berkeley. In 1741, Vane offered her an income and a separate household on the condition she returned to him. Ten years later, she published Memoires of a Lady of Quality, in which she describes her marriage and sexual escapades. Lord Vane is portrayed as a repulsive man whose sexual attempts "were like the pawings of an imp, sent from hell to teize [sic] and torment some guilty wretch". The narrative suggests that he suffered from erectile dysfunction. The couple spent the rest of their lives living in separate households, which (along with his efforts to bring his wife back) contributed to his financial downfall. Deeply indebted, Lord Vane was compelled to sell an estate in Staffordshire, Caverswall Castle, and give up his country seat in Kent. Lady Vane spent the last two decades of her life bedridden and died in 1788. Lord Vane died the next year at his home in Downing Street, London, and the Vane viscountcy became extinct.

Peerage of Ireland
Preceded by William Vane	Viscount Vane; 1734–1789	Extinct
