= William Vane, 1st Duke of Cleveland =

British landowner and politician

His Grace The Duke of Cleveland KG
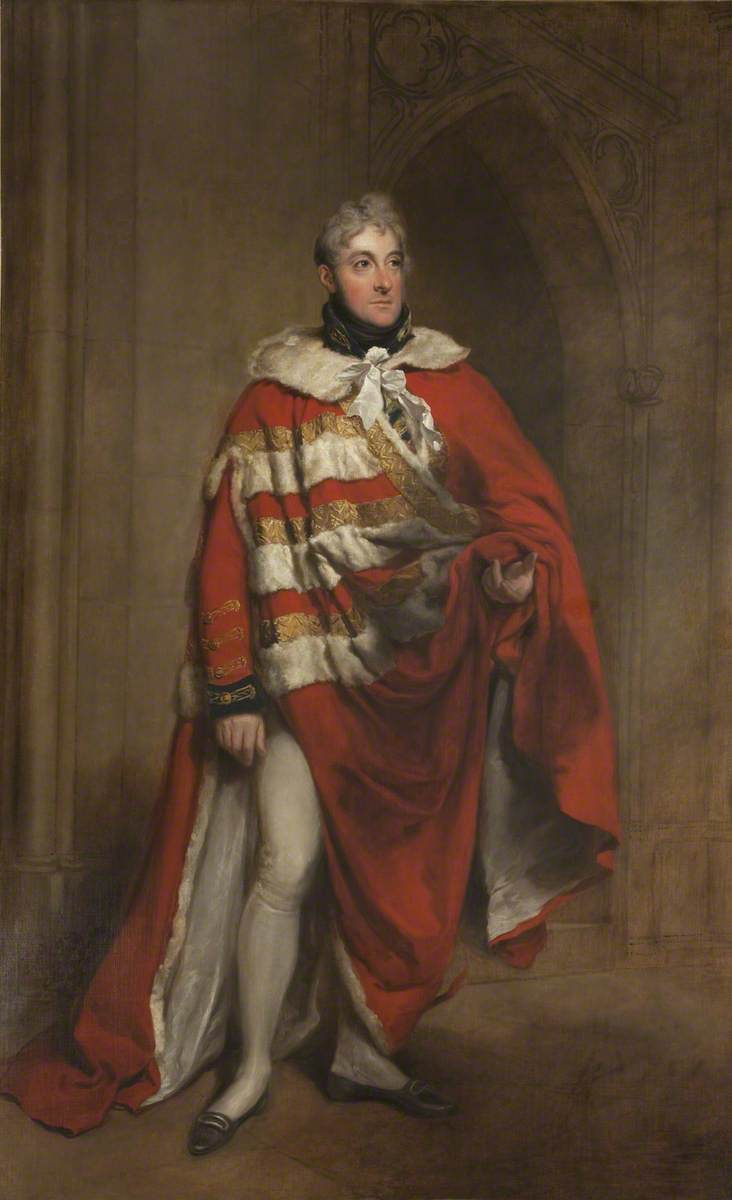
- Portrait by Arthur William Devis, 1810

Lord-Lieutenant of County Durham
- In office 1792–1842
- Monarchs: George III; George IV; William IV; Victoria
- Preceded by: The Earl of Darlington
- Succeeded by: The Marquess of Londonderry

Personal details
- Born: William Harry Vane; 27 July 1766
- Died: 29 January 1842 (aged 75) St James's Square, Westminster, London
- Spouses: Lady Catherine Powlett (m. 1787; died 1807) Elizabeth Russell (m. 1813)
- Children: 8, including Henry, William, and Harry
- Parents: Henry Vane, 2nd Earl of Darlington; Margaret Lowther
- Education: Christ Church, Oxford

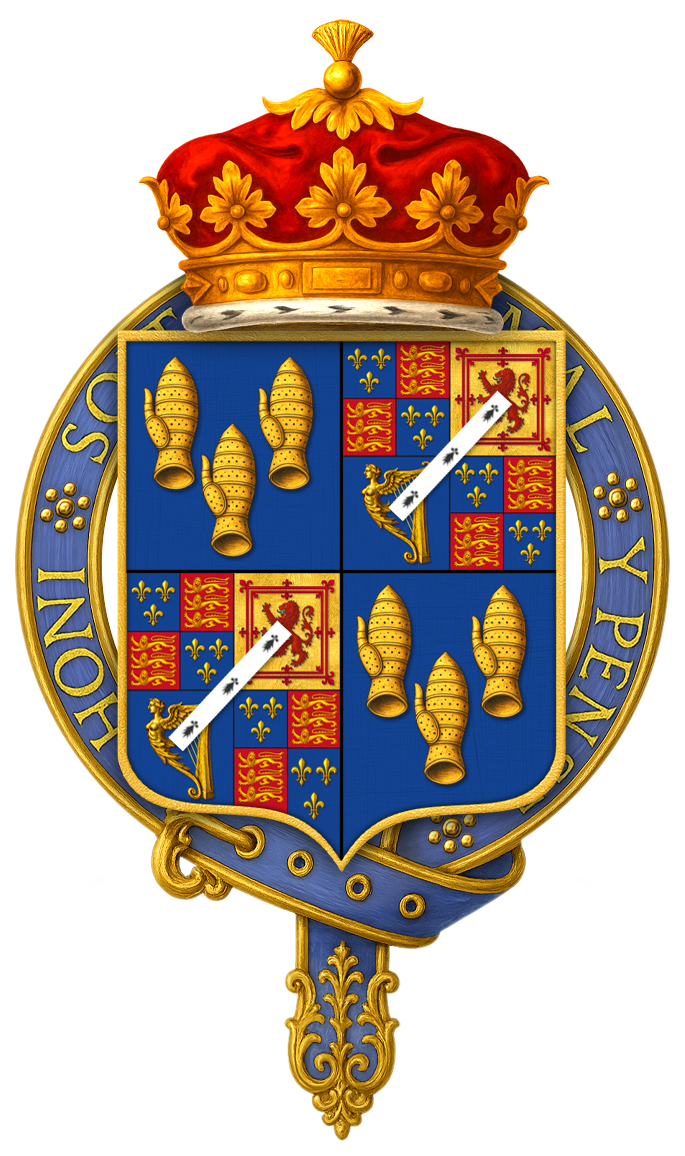
Quartered arms of William Harry Vane, 1st Duke of Cleveland, KG. Quarterly 1st and 4th: Azure, three sinister gauntlets appaumée or (VANE); 2nd and 3rd: The royal arms of King Charles II, over all a baton sinister ermine (FITZROY)

Arms of Vane: Azure, three sinister gauntlets (appaumée) or These are a difference of the arms of the Fane family, Earls of Westmorland from 1624, which show: three dexter gauntlets back affrontée, with identical tinctures

William Henry Vane, 1st Duke of Cleveland (27 July 1766 – 29 January 1842), styled Viscount Barnard until 1792 and known as The Earl of Darlington between 1792 and 1827 and as The Marquess of Cleveland between 1827 and 1833, was a British landowner, and politician.

== Background and education ==
Styled Viscount Barnard from birth, he was the son of Henry Vane, 2nd Earl of Darlington, son of Henry Vane, 1st Earl of Darlington, and Lady Grace FitzRoy, daughter of Charles FitzRoy, 2nd Duke of Cleveland, son of King Charles II by his mistress Barbara Palmer, 1st Duchess of Cleveland. His mother was Margaret Lowther, daughter of Robert Lowther, Governor of Barbados, and sister of James Lowther, 1st Earl of Lonsdale. He was baptised at the Chapel Royal at St James's Palace (with the names William Harry which he later changed to William Henry). He was educated at Christ Church, Oxford.

== Public life ==
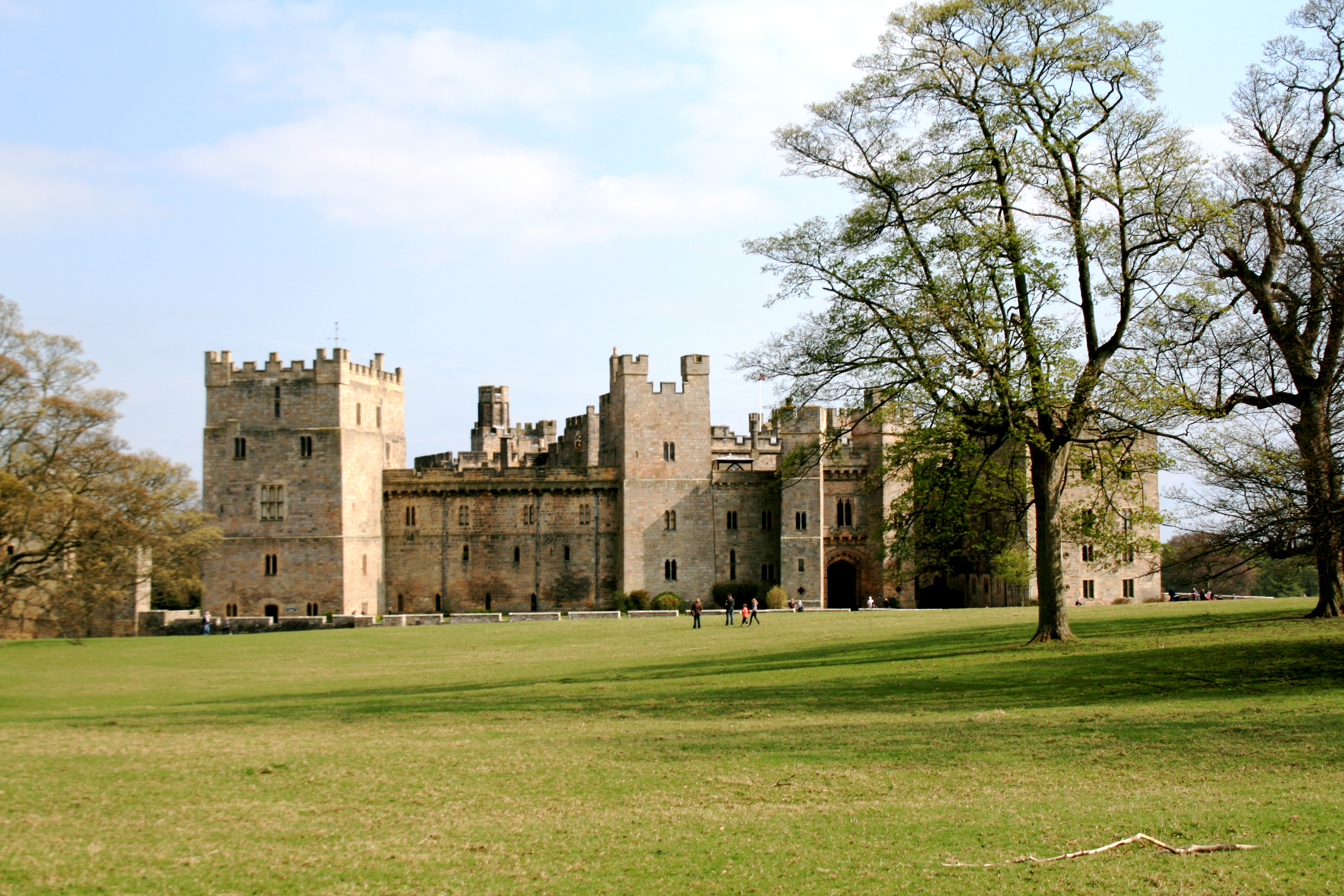
Raby Castle, County Durham, England.

Barnard was Whig Member of Parliament for Totnes from 1788 to 1790 and for Winchelsea from 1790 to 1792. The latter year he succeeded his father in the earldom and took his seat in the House of Lords. He also succeeded his father as Lord Lieutenant of County Durham, a post he held until his death. In 1794 he was announced as the Lieutenant-colonel of a regiment to be raised, the Durham Regiment of Fencible Cavalry. In 1810 he successfully laid claim to the Pulteney Estate in Bath after the Countess of Bath died intestate in 1808. In 1827 he was created Marquess of Cleveland, a revival of the Cleveland title held by his ancestors. He was Bearer of the Third Sword at King William IV's coronation on 8 September 1831. In 1833 he was made Baron Raby, of Raby Castle in the County Palatine of Durham, and Duke of Cleveland. He was further honoured when he was made a Knight of the Garter in 1839.

His promotions through the ranks of the peerage were not uncontroversial. Greville noted in his diary on 8 September 1831:

”Howe told me yesterday morning in Westminster Abbey that Lord Cleveland is to be made a duke, though it is not yet acknowledged if it is to be so. There has been a battle about that; they say that he got his boroughs to be made a marquis and got rid of them to be made a duke".

== Slave holder ==
According to the Legacies of British Slave-Ownership at the University College London, Cleveland was awarded compensation in the aftermath of the Slavery Abolition Act 1833 with the Slave Compensation Act 1837.

Cleveland was associated with "T71/898 Barbados claim no. 3184 (Lowther)"; he owned 233 slaves in Barbados and received a £4,854 payment at the time.

== Family ==
On 17 September 1787, he married his cousin, Lady Catherine Powlett (1766–1807), daughter of Harry Powlett, 6th Duke of Bolton, at her father's seat, Hackwood Park. Together, they had eight children:

- Henry, Earl of Darlington, later 2nd Duke of Cleveland (1788–1864); he married Lady Sophia Poulett, the eldest daughter of John Poulett, 4th Earl Poulett, in 1809.
- Lady Louisa Catherine Barbara Vane (1791–1821), who married Maj. Francis Forester in 1813 and had issue.
- Lord William Vane, later 3rd Duke of Cleveland (1792–1864); he married Lady Grace Caroline Lowther, a daughter of William Lowther, 1st Earl of Lonsdale, in 1815.
- Lady Caroline Vane (1795–1795), who died young.
- Lady Augusta Henrietta Vane (1796–1874), who married Mark Milbank and had issue, including Sir Frederick Milbank, 1st Baronet.
- Lady Arabella Vane (1801–1864), who married Richard Arden, 3rd Baron Alvanley.
- Lord Harry Vane, later 4th Duke of Cleveland (1803–1891); he married Lady Dalmeny, the daughter of Philip Henry Stanhope, 4th Earl Stanhope and widow of Archibald Primrose, Lord Dalmeny, in 1854.
- Lady Laura Vane (1807–1882), who married Lieutenant-Colonel William Henry Meyrick and had issue.

After his first wife's death in London in June 1807, Cleveland married as his second wife, Elizabeth Russell (c. 1777–1861), daughter of Robert Russell, on 27 July 1813. There were no children from this marriage. Cleveland died at St James's Square, Westminster, London, in January 1842, aged 75, and was buried at Staindrop, County Durham. His eldest son Henry succeeded in the dukedom. The Duchess of Cleveland died in January 1861.

Parliament of Great Britain
Preceded by Sir Philip Jennings-Clerke, Bt; Henry Phipps	Member of Parliament for Totnes; 1788–1790; With: Henry Phipps	Succeeded by William Powlett Powlett; Francis Buller Yarde
Preceded by John Nesbitt; William Nedham	Member of Parliament for Winchelsea; 1790–1792; With: Richard Barwell	Succeeded by Richard Barwell; Sir Frederick Fletcher-Vane, Bt
Honorary titles
Preceded by The Earl of Darlington	Lord Lieutenant of County Durham; 1792–1842	Succeeded by The Marquess of Londonderry
Vacant Title last held by The Earl of Darlington	Vice-Admiral of Durham; 1795–1842	Succeeded by The Marquess of Londonderry
Peerage of the United Kingdom
New creation	Duke of Cleveland; 1833–1842	Succeeded by Henry Vane
New creation	Marquess of Cleveland; 1827–1842	Succeeded by Henry Vane
Peerage of Great Britain
Preceded by Henry Vane	Earl of Darlington; 1792–1842	Succeeded by Henry Vane
