= Henry Vane, 12th Baron Barnard =

British peer (born 1959)

Henry Francis Cecil Vane, 12th Baron Barnard (born 11 March 1959), known as Harry Vane, is a British landowner and nobleman. He inherited his title in 2016 when his father died.

== Background and early life ==
Vane is the son of the 11th Baron Barnard and Lady Davina Mary, née Cecil, the eldest daughter of David Cecil, 6th Marquess of Exeter, the Olympic gold medallist who inspired the character of Lord Andrew Lindsay in the film Chariots of Fire (1981). He was educated at Eton, followed by a BSc in economics at the University of Edinburgh and an MBA at Durham University. After graduating, he worked for the Buccleuch estate and for Christie's auction house.

He lives and works in County Durham. He owns the Raby estates and castle, and other properties. He has been a trustee of Lord Crewe's charity and president of the Friends of the Bowes Museum, and is patron of the Tees River Trust.

== Family ==
On 12 December 1998, Vane married Lydia Katherine (Kate) Robson, the daughter of Christopher Robson of Rudd Hall, Richmond, Yorkshire. They have three children, two daughters and a son:

- Cicely Margaret Vane (born 20 June 2000)
- Alice Isabella Vane (born 16 October 2001)
- William Henry Cecil Vane (born 4 June 2005)

Peerage of England
| Preceded by John Vane | Baron Barnard; 2016–present | Incumbent; Heir apparent: Hon. William Vane |
