= Raby Castle =

Medieval castle in England

Coordinates: 54°35′27″N 1°48′7″W

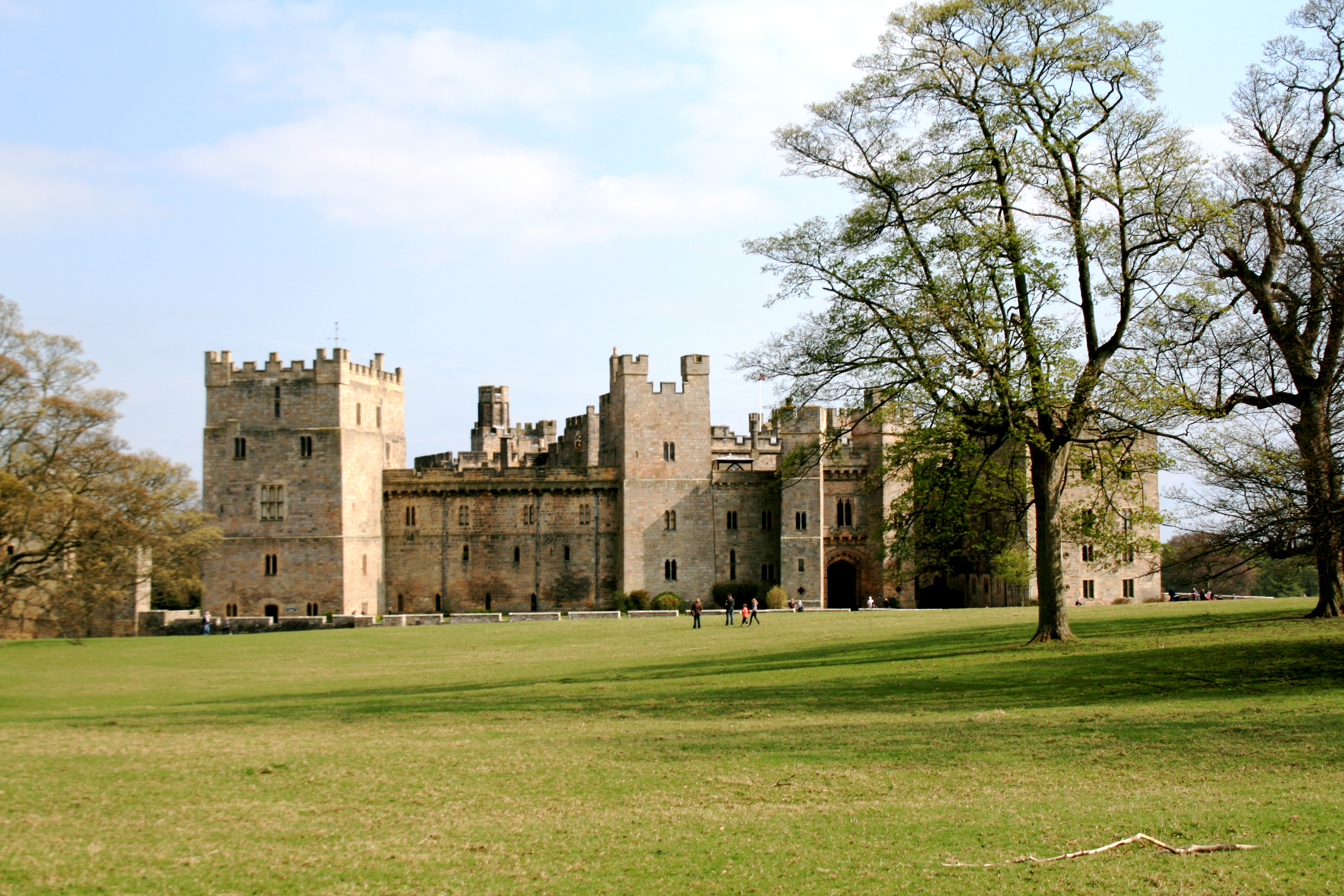
A view of Raby Castle, County Durham (Spring 2009)

Raby Castle (grid reference NZ12912177) is a medieval castle located near Staindrop in County Durham, England, among 200 acres (810,000 m^{2}) of deer park. It was built by John Neville, 3rd Baron Neville de Raby, between approximately 1367 and 1390. Cecily Neville, the mother of the Kings Edward IV and Richard III, was born here. After Charles Neville, 6th Earl of Westmorland, led the failed Rising of the North in favour of Mary, Queen of Scots in 1569 Raby Castle was taken into royal custody.

Sir Henry Vane the Elder purchased Raby Castle in 1626 and neighbouring Barnard Castle from the Crown, and the Earls of Darlington and Dukes of Cleveland added a Gothic-style entrance hall and octagonal drawing room. From 1833 to 1891 they were the Dukes of Cleveland and they retain the title of Lord Barnard. Extensive alterations were carried out in the 17th and 18th centuries. It is famed for both its size and its art, including works by old masters and portraits. After 1733 it was frequented from his young age of eleven by the poet Christopher Smart, who eloped briefly at the age of thirteen with Anne Vane, daughter of Henry Vane, who succeeded to the Barnard title. It is a Grade I listed building and open to the public on a seasonal basis.

The castle is still a private home and remains the seat of the Vane family, the Barons Barnard. The 11th Baron carried out an extensive programme of renovation and restoration after inheriting the barony in 1964.

== History ==
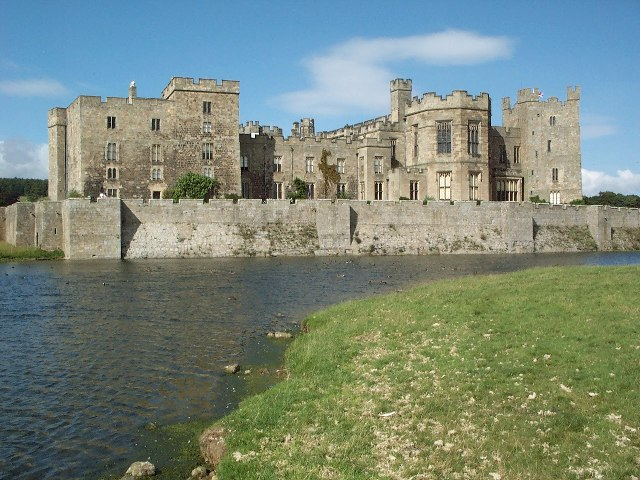
The south front of Raby Castle with its moat

The House of Neville held the manor of Raby from the 13th century, and, although the family had no formal title, from 1295 they were summoned to Parliament as Barons of Raby.

Ralph Neville, 1st Baron Neville de Raby, was the first to be summoned to Parliament. His heir, John Neville (1299/1300–1335), became a member of Thomas, 2nd Earl of Lancaster's household, beginning the family's link with the Earls of Lancaster. Raby was the family's seat of power, and there may have been a fortified house on the site of the present building from around 1300. In the second half of the 14th century the Nevilles began rebuilding several of their properties in northern England, including Raby Castle between roughly 1367 and 1390. In the closing years of the century the Nevilles were becoming one of the most powerful families in northern England, comparable to the House of Percy, who had been made Earls of Northumberland in 1377.

In 1378 Thomas Hatfield Bishop of Durham granted John de Neville a licence to fortify his property at Raby. John died in 1388 and was succeeded by his son, Ralph. Almost nothing of the family's papers survives from this period, so there is little documentary evidence of Raby Castle's construction. The dating is based mostly on architectural details. In the words of historian Anthony Emery, the work "converted it from a defendable house into a palace-fortress".

Ralph was created Earl of Westmorland on 29 September 1397 by Richard II as a reward for his loyalty in the face of political unrest. However his family's traditional association with the Earls of Lancaster meant that when Henry Bolingbroke of the House of Lancaster invaded in July 1399 Neville sided with Bolingbroke. Neville helped persuade Richard II to abdicate and Henry was crowned as Henry IV. Neville was made Earl Marshal of England on the day of Henry's coronation and a Knight of the Order of the Garter in 1403.

Henry Neville, 5th Earl of Westmorland, died in 1564 and was succeeded by his son, Charles. The Nevilles were Catholics and Charles was one of the leaders of the failed Rising of the North in 1569 against England's Protestant Queen Elizabeth I. Owing to the severity of the threat to the Crown, more than 800 rebels were executed and Charles Neville and Thomas Percy, 7th Earl of Northumberland and another leader of the rebellion) fled into exile. In 1571 an attainder was issued against Neville and his lands were forfeited to the Crown.

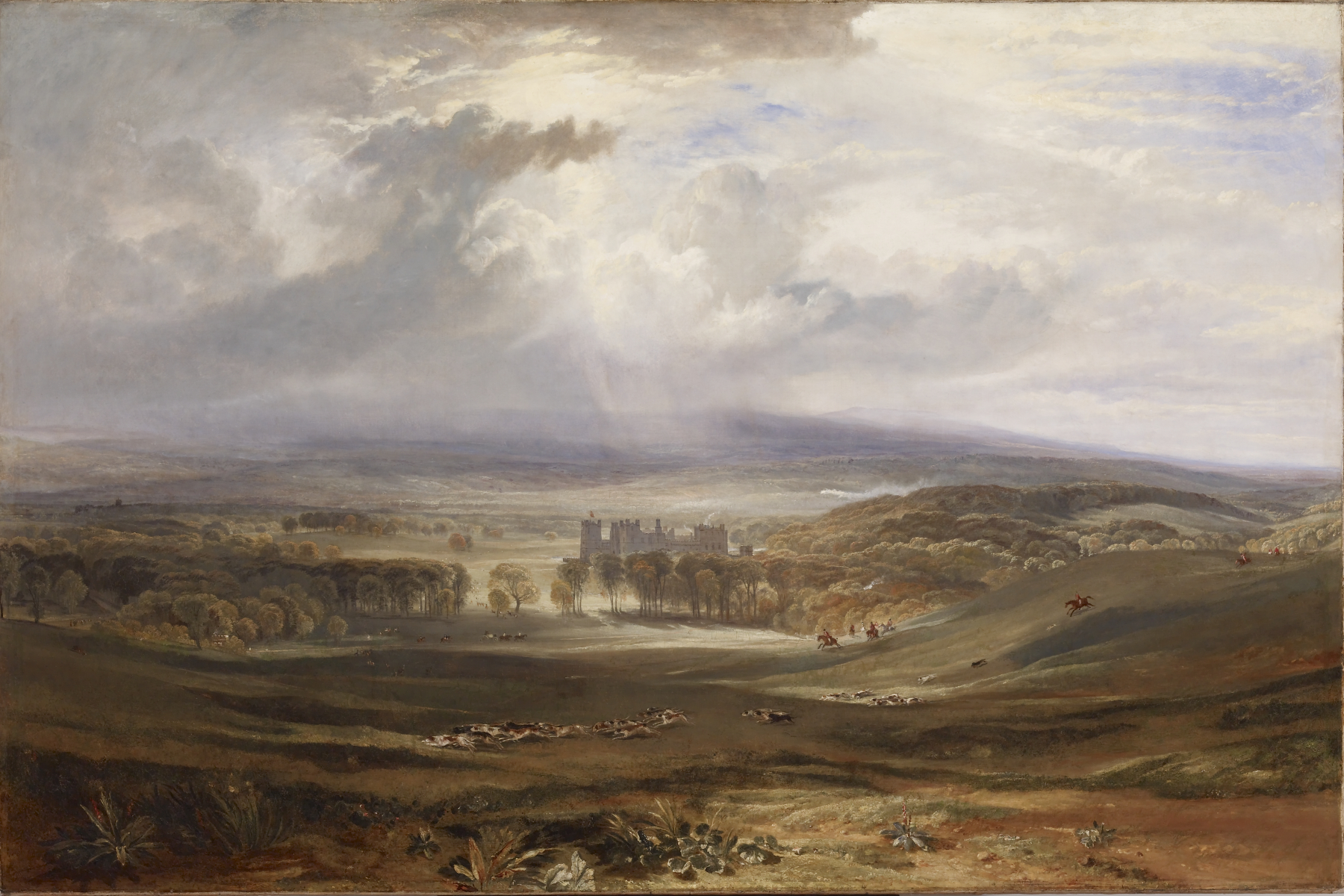
Raby Castle, an 1817 J. M. W. Turner painting of Raby Castle and its landscape. Now in the Walters Art Museum, Baltimore.

After the Rising of the North the castle became the property of the Crown for more than forty-three years before being bought by Henry Vane the Elder. He was impressed by the size and lands, contrasting with Barnard Castle, which was hemmed in by the surrounding town. The House of Vane was responsible for much of the modernising of the castle, especially the interior. This included renovation of the medieval chapel and drawing room.

The family drove a carriageway though the castle, causing much damage to its medieval fabric. Architect William Burn carried out alterations to Raby Castle between 1843 and 1848, including adding new roofs to the great hall and the chapel and adding a drawing room to one of the towers in Jacobean style. The present family is responsible for the great collection of art in the castle.

On 17 March 1849, when William the then Prince of Orange succeeded to the throne of the Netherlands, he was at that moment a guest of the Duchess of Cleveland in Raby Castle.

In 1890 the 4th Duke of Cleveland died, leaving the line of succession to the castle and its vast estates unclear. The case was decided in 1891 when the Committee of Privileges of the House of Lords deemed his relative, Henry Vane, to be the 9th Baron Barnard and inheritor of the vast estates of Raby. He did not, however, inherit the title of Duke of Cleveland, which became extinct.

== Layout ==
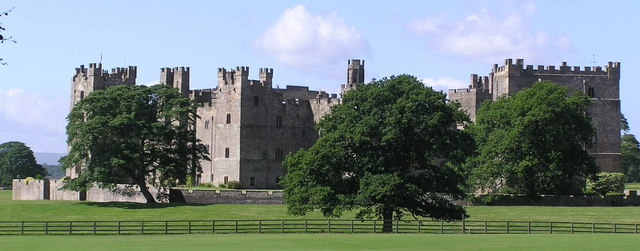
A panorama of the castle showing the towers and defences from the north east

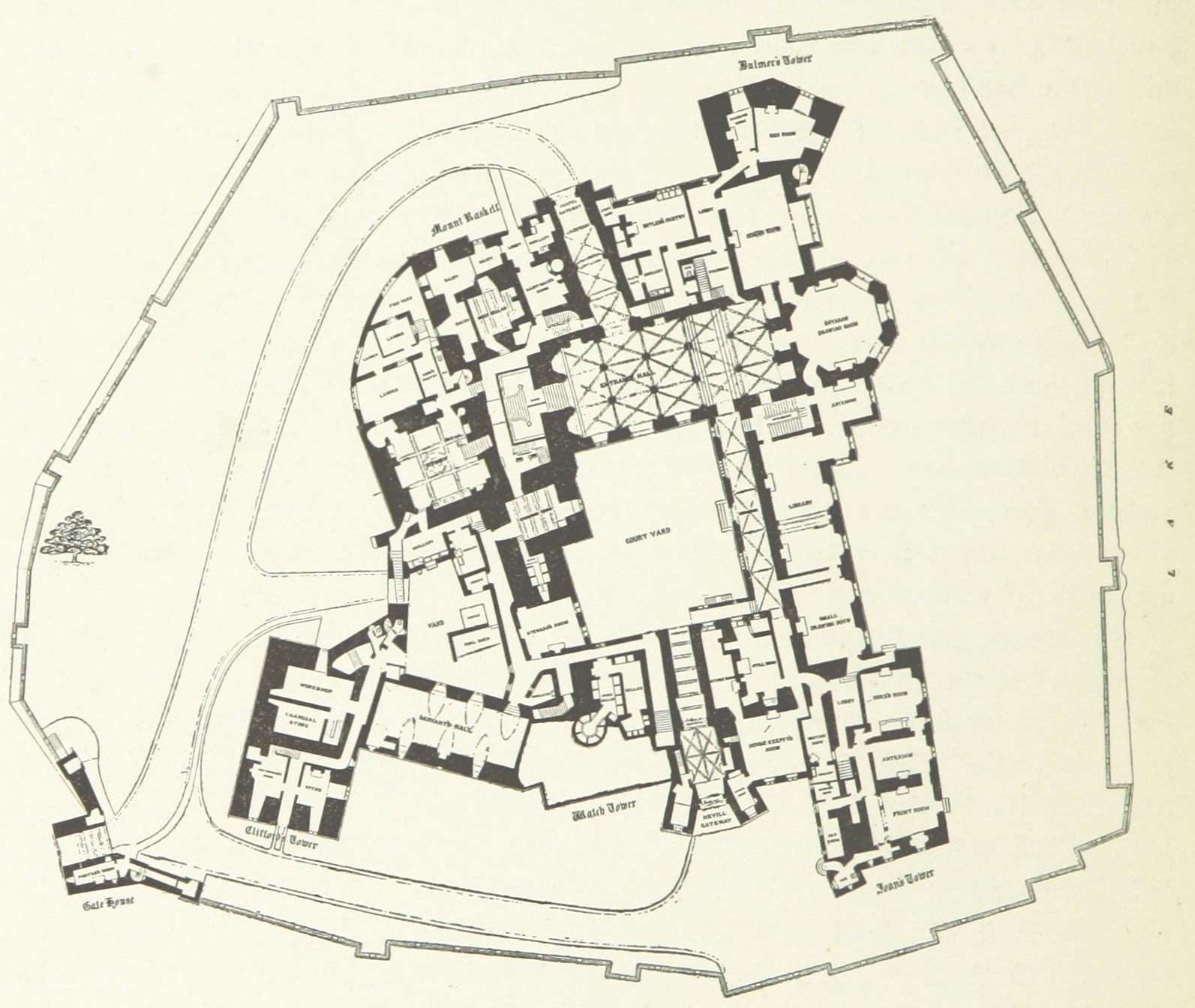
A plan of the castle from J. D. Mackenzie's The Castles of England: their story and structure

Raby Castle has an irregular plan, with nine towers along its perimeter. The main entrance was in the west through the four-storey Neville Gateway. Access to the gatehouse was via a drawbridge, since replaced by a flagged causeway. The gatehouse originally contained three portcullises, as is shown by the still-visible grooves used to work them. Two smaller towers beside the gatehouse have no defensive function and were added during the renovations of Henry Vane, 2nd Earl of Darlington.

Access to the gatehouse is via a door through the curtain wall, which rose to a height of thirty feet from the waters of the moat. It is strengthened periodically by buttress towers and formed the second line of defence, the moat being the first. The passage along the parapet was the ancient chemin de ronde (allure) on which guards were posted. Similar passages can be found at York Castle and around the city of Oxford. The castle buildings surround a central courtyard. Forming its east side is the great hall, also known as the Baron's Hall. The interiors of the medieval kitchen and keep are mostly intact.

== Gardens ==
The Castle Gardens have been remodeled by an Italian garden designer, Luciano Giubbilei, and Lady Barnard. The East Garden now features a grass amphitheatre, the first to be created in northern England.

== Filming ==
Raby Castle doubled for various royal houses during the production of the 1998 film Elizabeth. Raby Lake stood in for the River Thames during the filming of a night-time party scene.

In 2023, American television drama series Billions used the castle as the home of Bobby Axelrod, played by Damian Lewis, as shown in Season 7, Episode 2: "Original Sin".

Raby Castle was used as the setting for "Falstone Castle" in a Sarah M. Eden novel turned film in 2026, Seeking Persephone, starring Ryann Bailey and Jake Stormoen.

== Art ==
The castle is famous for its works of art, mostly collected by the Vane Family, including old masters and family portraits. Noted artists whose work is in the castle's collection include Giordano, Van Dyck and Sir Joshua Reynolds. The Small Drawing Room has a fine collection of sporting paintings, reflecting the interests of the family, including works by Ben Marshall, Henry Bernard Chalon and Sir Alfred Munnings, among others.

There are some fine paintings in the library, including two architectural capriccios, one by Marco and Sebastiano Ricci and the other by Antonio Joli. A number of portraits include two paintings by Sir Peter Lely of Lady Mary Sackville and Louise de Kerouaille, a portrait of William Bankes by Pompeo Batoni and others of the family, including Sir Henry Vane the Elder and Sir Henry Vane the Younger, the latter at one time Governor of Massachusetts.

The pictures in the ante-library are chiefly of the Dutch and Flemish schools of painting and include works by Pieter de Hooch and David Teniers the Younger. The dining room contains some of the castle's most impressive paintings, including works by Sir Joshua Reynolds and Sir Anthony van Dyck. The paintings in this room are mostly portraits of members of the family or associates.

| Artist or medium | Title or description of subject |
|---|---|
| Sir Godfrey Kneller | Alexander Pope in his 28th year |
| J.S.C. Schaak | Joseph Interpreting the Dream of Pharaoh's Chief Baker |
| William Hoare of Bath | William Murray, 1st Earl of Mansfield |
| Circle of Charles Jervas | An unknown Gentleman, possibly one of the sons of Gilbert Vane, 2nd Baron Barnard |
| Michiel Jansz. van Mierevelt | Sir Henry Vane the Elder |
| Circle of Joris Van Son | A Composition of Fruit and Lobsters |
| Claude-Joseph Vernet | A rocky coastal Scene |
| Sir Peter Lely | Sir Henry Vane the Younger |
| Francesco da Ponte Bassano | A Vegetable and Fruit Market |
| Robert Walker | Oliver Cromwell |
| Aert van der Neer | River Scene at Midnight |
| Cornelis de Vos | A Gentleman and his Wife, believed to be either Jakob Jordans and his wife or Syders and his wife |
| Circle of Van Dyck | James Hamilton, 1st Lord Hamilton |
| Sir Anthony van Dyck | Sir John Finch, Lord Finch of Fordwich |
| Sir Joshua Reynolds P.R.A. | Lady Katherine Margaret Powlett |
| Attributed to William Hoare of Bath | William Pulteney, 1st Earl of Bath |
| Luca Giordano | Marcus Curtius leaping into the Gulf |
| Jacopo Amigoni | Frederick, Prince of Wales |
| Thomas Barker | The Woodman Returning |
| Hiram Powers | The Greek Slave |
