= Christopher Vane, 10th Baron Barnard =

British peer and military officer (1888–1964)

The Right Honourable The Lord Barnard CMG OBE MC TD
- Baron Barnard in 1931

Member of the House of Lords
- Lord Temporal
- In office 28 December 1918 – 19 October 1964
- Preceded by: The 9th Baron Barnard
- Succeeded by: The 11th Baron Barnard

Personal details
- Born: Christopher William Vane; 28 October 1888 Raby Castle, County Durham, England
- Died: 19 October 1964 (aged 75) Royal Victoria Infirmary, Newcastle upon Tyne
- Spouse: Sylvia Mary Straker (m. 1920)
- Children: 3
- Parents: Henry de Vere Vane (father); Lady Catharine Sarah Cecil (mother)
- Relatives: Henry Cecil Vane (brother); Harry John Neville Vane (son)
- Education: Eton College
- Alma mater: Trinity College, Cambridge
- Occupation: Military officer
- Military career
- Allegiance: United Kingdom
- Branch: British Army
- Service years: 1914–1931
- Rank: Major
- Units: Westmorland and Cumberland Yeomanry; Durham Light Infantry
- Conflicts: World War I
- Awards: MC

Christopher William Vane, 10th Baron Barnard, CMG, OBE, MC, TD (28 October 1888 – 19 October 1964), was a British peer and military officer.

== Education ==
Lord Barnard was born on 28 October 1888, the second son of Henry Vane, 9th Baron Barnard, and his wife, the Lady Catharine Sarah Cecil, who was daughter of the 3rd Marquess of Exeter, at Barnard Castle in County Durham.

Following in the footsteps of his father, he attended Eton College, but unlike many of his ancestors studied at Trinity College, Cambridge, for a B.A. rather than attending the University of Oxford. It was at Cambridge that he joined the Freemasons, being initiated into Isaac Newton University Lodge.

== Career ==
=== Military ===
Upon the completion of his degree, he entered the armed services, participating in World War I as a major in the Westmorland and Cumberland Yeomanry in which he was awarded the Military Cross and wounded in action twice. The citation for his MC, which appeared in The London Gazette in July 1918, reads as follows:

For conspicuous gallantry and devotion to duty. His company was the last of the battalion to evacuate the trenches. He remained behind until all his men were clear, and assisted in giving covering fire with the last platoon, although badly wounded. He set a fine example and cheered his men on, quite regardless of his own safety.

His eldest brother, the Hon. Henry Cecil Vane, heir apparent to the barony of Barnard, also served in the Great War but was subsequently wounded and died of those wounds shortly thereafter in 1917, leaving his younger brother heir apparent to the title of Baron Barnard.

In 1922, Lord Barnard gained the rank of major in the 6th Battalion of the Durham Light Infantry and served with distinction in the battalion until 1931.

=== Civilian ===
Upon his retirement from the armed services, Lord Barnard took a number of roles, mostly in the service of County Durham. Between 1920 and 1963 he was Master, and, subsequently, Joint Master of the Zetland Hunt and between the years 1958 and 1964 the Lord Lieutenant of Durham. He was also a County Commissioner for the Durham Boy Scouts Association. He was a keen horticulturist.

He was a member of Brooks's gentleman's club and resided at Raby Castle. Unlike his father, he did not keep a London season home at 20 Belgrave Square, SW.

== Marriage and issue ==
On 14 October 1920 he married Sylvia Mary Straker the daughter of Hubert Straker, at St Agatha's, Gilling West, and had three children:

- The Hon. Rosemary Myra Vane (1921–1999)
- Harry John Neville Vane, 11th Baron Barnard (1923–2016)
- The Hon. Gerald Raby Vane (1926–1993)

== Honours and accolades ==
Lord Barnard received many honours. In 1930 he was invested as a Companion of the Order of St. Michael and St. George, and gained the honorary rank of Colonel in the service of the 6th Battalion of the Durham Light Infantry, his former unit. He was invested as an Officer of the Order of the British Empire in 1955.

== Decline and death ==
In 1964 he gave up the Lord Lieutenancy of County Durham. Notably, a few weeks before his death he divested himself of all but 1,713 acres (693 ha) of the 53,000-acre (21,000 ha) Raby estate. He also resigned from the presidency of the County Territorial Army and Air Force Association. He died on 19 October 1964 at the Royal Victoria Infirmary, Newcastle upon Tyne.

Honorary titles
Preceded by Jack Lawson	Lord Lieutenant of Durham; 1958–1964	Succeeded by Sir James Fitzjames Duff
Peerage of England
Preceded by Henry Vane	Baron Barnard; 1918–1964; Member of the House of Lords (1918–1964)	Succeeded by John Vane
