= Henry Cecil Vane =

British Army officer & aristocrat (1882-1917)

Hon. Henry Cecil Vane
- Born: 19 September 1882; Raby Castle, County Durham, England
- Died: 9 October 1917 (aged 35); France
- Education: Eton College
- Alma mater: Christ Church, Oxford
- Spouse: Lady Enid Victoria Rachel Fane (m. 1914)
- Children: 0
- Parents: Henry de Vere Vane (father); Lady Catharine Sarah Cecil (mother)
- Relatives: Christopher Vane (brother)
- Military career
- Allegiance: United Kingdom
- Branch: British Army
- Service years: 1914–1917
- Rank: Major
- Units: Durham Light Infantry; Yorkshire Hussars
- Conflicts: World War I

Major Hon. Henry Cecil Vane (19 September 1882 – 9 October 1917) was the son and heir apparent of Henry Vane, 9th Baron Barnard of Raby Castle. He was wounded in World War I and died of those wounds shortly after, leaving his younger brother Christopher as heir to the Raby estates.

== Education ==
Vane was born on 19 September 1882 as the first son and heir apparent of Henry Vane, 9th Baron Barnard, at Raby Castle in County Durham. Following family tradition, he attended Eton College and went up to Christ Church at the University of Oxford where he read for a BA, taking the degree in 1900.

On 25 August 1914, he married the Lady Enid Victoria Rachel Fane, daughter of Anthony Fane, 13th Earl of Westmorland, and Sybil Fane, Countess of Westmorland.

== Career ==
Vane was an officer in the 2nd Volunteer Battalion of the Durham Light Infantry, part of the Volunteer Force, but transferred in March 1903 to become a lieutenant in the 3rd Battalion, part of the militia, where he later held a captain's commission. Three years after his university graduation, in 1903, he became aide-de-camp to Oliver Russell, 2nd Baron Ampthill, the two-time Governor of Madras, who was, like Vane's father, a member of The Royal Alpha Lodge. In his capacity as aide-de-camp, he subsequently acted for James Thompson and Sir Gabriel Stokes. He left this position in 1907.

In the service of the Yorkshire Hussars Yeomanry he gained the rank of Captain and then Major.

== Pastimes ==
Vane was a keen huntsman and Master of the Foxhounds for the Zetland Hunt between 1909 up until his premature death, and renowned as a "gallant officer" and gentleman. He was a member of the Marlborough gentleman's club and the Yorkshire Club.

== Death ==
He went into active service during World War I and was injured in that conflict in October 1917. He died in a hospital in France as a result of those injuries on 9 October 1917. On 31 December 1917 his will was probated by his wife. As he left no issue, his younger brother Christopher inherited the title in December 1918. His wife married again on 1 September 1922 to Major Herbert Broke Turnor, the son of Algernon Turnor, and had two daughters by him in 1924 and 1926. She died 9 September 1969.
