= Henry Vane, 9th Baron Barnard =

English peer (1854–1918)

The Right Honourable The Lord Barnard FSA JP DCL
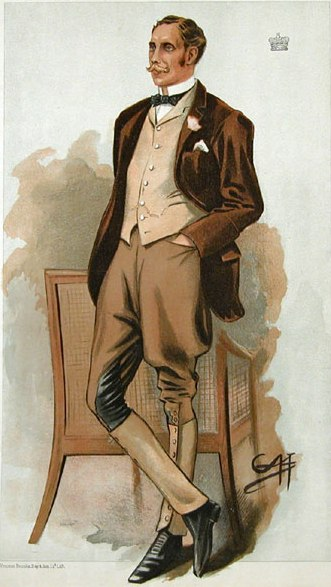
- Caricature of Lord Barnard in Vanity Fair, 15 December 1898.

Member of the House of Lords
- Lord Temporal
- In office 1892 – 28 December 1918
- Preceded by: The 4th Duke of Cleveland
- Succeeded by: The 10th Baron Barnard

Personal details
- Born: Henry de Vere Vane; 10 May 1854 Durham
- Died: 28 December 1918 (aged 64)
- Occupation: Chief Commissioner

Henry de Vere Vane, 9th Baron Barnard, FSA, JP, DCL (10 May 1854 – 28 December 1918), was a British hereditary peer and senior Freemason.

== Education ==
He was born, on 10 May 1854, as the son of Sir Henry Morgan Vane at Durham. In his youth he was educated at Eton College. Following in the family tradition, he went up to the University of Oxford in about 1873, reading for a BA at Brasenose College and attaining the degree in 1876.

After three years of training he became a barrister being called to the bar by the Inner Temple; although it is unlikely he ever practised as a barrister.

== Marriage and children ==
On 28 June 1881, he married Lady Catharine Sarah Cecil, daughter of the 3rd Marquess of Exeter, at St Thomas Marylebone, and had three living sons, one of them predeceasing him. He also served in the Northamptonshire Militia between 1876 and 1884.

His heir apparent was his second son, Christopher, who served in the Westmorland and Cumberland Yeomanry being wounded in action and decorated in World War I. Lord Barnard's first son, the Hon. Henry Cecil Vane, was badly wounded in France and subsequently died from his wounds.

== Civil service career ==
Although the son of a minor member of the aristocracy, Lord Barnard did not expect to inherit Raby Castle as he was not directly in the line of succession. Therefore, he pursued a career in the civil service at the Charity Commission between 1881 and 1891. He was promoted to the Private Secretary to the Chief Commissioner in 1885 and served in that post until 1890.

== Elevation to the peerage ==
In 1891 the 4th Duke of Cleveland died, leaving the line of succession to the dukedom unclear. The case was decided in 1892 when the Committee of Privileges of the House of Lords held him to be the 9th Baron Barnard and inheritor of the vast estates of Raby although he did not inherit the title of Duke of Cleveland which became extinct. Lord Barnard therefore left the Charity Commission to concentrate on the management of the estate. Contemporary sources describe him in this role as:

[winning] the hearts of all by his unaffected kindliness and consideration, and by the interest he evinced in everything that concerned the welfare of his estates and neighbours.

== Masonic career ==
Lord Barnard's masonic career commenced in 1874 when he was initiated into Apollo University Lodge No. 357 while studying at the University of Oxford. When in London he became a member of Lodge of Friendship No. 6, where one of the members was John Fawcett who was Provincial Grand Master of Durham at the time.

His association with the Province of Durham commenced during 1892 when he joined Rose of Raby Lodge No. 1650 at Staindrop. This was the village nearest to his Raby Castle home. Two years later he was installed as master. Subsequent masonic accolades followed when in 1895 he was appointed Provincial Senior Grand Warden for the Province of Durham and in the same year appointed Junior Grand Warden of the United Grand Lodge of England. He joined Lambton Lodge No. 375 and was installed as Master shortly afterwards. He became a member and Past Master of the distinguished Royal Alpha Lodge No. 16 into which Prince Arthur of Connaught was initiated. On the death of Hedworth Williamson during 1900, Lord Barnard was appointed Provincial Grand Master of Durham.

His legal training and business skills vastly improved the organisation of freemasonry in north east England, with membership increasing from 3,330 to 9,000 during his tenure. Two lodges, Lord Barnard Lodge No. 2935 at South Shields (consecrated during 1902) and Vane Lodge No. 3110 at Bishop Auckland (consecrated in 1905) were named in his honour.

== Honours and accolades ==
Lord Barnard held the honorary position of Colonel 4th (Special Reserve) Battalion Durham Light Infantry, and as Chairman of the Tees Fishery Board, was a governor of Shrewsbury School and served as treasurer of the Salop Infirmary at Shrewsbury in 1899. He was a member of Brooks's and the Oxford and Cambridge Club. As with the fashion of the time, he kept two houses, his provincial home being Raby Castle, Darlington and a residence for the London season at 20 Belgrave Square, SW. He was also awarded the honorary degree of Doctor of Civil Law (DCL) from the University of Durham in September 1901.

== Death ==
In November 1917, following the death of their first son in France, Lady Barnard fell ill and died on 16 March 1918. Lord Barnard died nine months later, on 28 December 1918; his funeral was held New Year's Eve. A masonic memorial service was held at Durham Cathedral, at which the Dean of Durham James Welldon stated:

[he] succeeded by inheritance to a great position upon which it had not been possible for him with complete certainty to reckon. He accepted it in the simple spirit of duty and made best use of it while life and health were his, for the good of his fellow citizens.

Peerage of England
Preceded by Harry Powlett	Baron Barnard; 1892–1918; Member of the House of Lords (1892–1918)	Succeeded by Christopher Vane
