= John Vane, 11th Baron Barnard =

British peer

The Right Honourable The Lord Barnard TD JP DL

Member of the House of Lords
- Lord Temporal
- as a hereditary peer 19 October 1964 – 11 November 1999
- Monarch: Elizabeth II
- Preceded by: The 10th Baron Barnard
- Succeeded by: Seat abolished (Note: Under the House of Lords Act 1999.)

Lord Lieutenant of Durham
- In office 1 October 1970 – 21 April 1988
- Monarch: Elizabeth II
- Preceded by: Sir James Fitzjames Duff
- Succeeded by: David James Grant

Personal details
- Born: Harry John Neville Vane; 21 September 1923 Raby Castle, County Durham
- Died: 3 April 2016 (aged 92) Raby Castle, County Durham
- Education: Durham University (MSc)
- Military career
- Allegiance: United Kingdom
- Branch: Royal Air Force (1945–1948); British Army (1948–1966)
- Service years: 1945–1966
- Rank: Lieutenant Colonel
- Unit: Northumberland Hussars
- Commands: Northumberland Hussars
- Awards: Efficiency Decoration

Harry John Neville Vane, 11th Baron Barnard (21 September 1923 – 3 April 2016), was an English peer and landowner in Northumbria and County Durham.

== Life ==
Born at Raby Castle in County Durham, the son of Christopher Vane, 10th Baron Barnard, the young Vane was educated at Eton College. On leaving school in 1942 he joined the Royal Air Force Volunteer Reserve, training in South Africa, although he would never see combat. In the aftermath of the war he was commissioned into the Northumberland Hussars. From 1952 to 1961, as John Vane, he was a county councillor for County Durham and also, from 1956 to 1970, a Deputy Lieutenant of Durham.

In 1960, Vane was awarded the Territorial Decoration, and in 1961 he became a Justice of the Peace for County Durham.

In 1964, on his father's death, he succeeded him as Baron Barnard, with a seat in the House of Lords, and inherited an estate of some 60,000 acres.

He was Lieutenant Colonel of the Northumberland Hussars between 1964 and 1966, Lord Lieutenant of Durham between 1970 and 1988, and Honorary Colonel of the 7th (Durham) Battalion, Light Infantry, between 1979 and 1989.

At the age of 63, Lord Barnard, who had missed his university years in his youth because of the war, surprised friends by enrolling at Durham University Business School and taking an MSc in Management Studies.

He was initiated into freemasonry in Agricola Lodge No. 7741 in 1961. He served as Provincial Grand Master of the Provincial Grand Lodge of Durham from December 1969 until January 1998, and served as Senior Grand Warden of the United Grand Lodge of England in 1970–1971.

On his death in 2016, he left an estate valued at £94 million (equivalent to £128,995,694 in 2025).

== Family ==
He married Lady Davina Mary Cecil (1931–2018), daughter of David Cecil, 6th Marquess of Exeter, on 8 October 1952 at St Margaret's, Westminster. They were divorced in 1992. They had five children; Henry, who succeeded as the 12th Baron, and four daughters.

Lady Barnard retired to Barningham, where she died in 2018.

== Notes ==
Honorary titles
Preceded by Sir James Fitzjames Duff	Lord Lieutenant of Durham; 1970–1988	Succeeded by David James Grant
Peerage of England
Preceded by Christopher Vane	Baron Barnard; 1964–2016; Member of the House of Lords (1964–1999)	Succeeded by Henry Vane
