= Frederick Vane =

British politician (1732–1801)

Frederick Vane (26 June 1732 – 28 April 1801) was a British politician, the second son of Henry Vane, 1st Earl of Darlington. He sat on the family interest for County Durham from 1761 to 1774, and took an active part in debates over the British East India Company in 1773.

Vane was the second son of Henry Vane, 1st Earl of Darlington, and his wife Lady Grace FitzRoy. He was educated at Westminster School from 1740 to 1746, and matriculated at Peterhouse, Cambridge in 1750. On 15 June 1758, he married Henrietta Meredith, the sister of Sir William Meredith, 3rd Baronet, by whom he had one daughter.

He was returned as Member of Parliament for County Durham at the 1761 British general election on the family interest, where he replaced his younger brother Raby Vane. Henry Vane, 2nd Earl of Darlington had chosen to place his interest behind Frederick and Robert Shafto, although the latter was suspected of Tory sympathies; Sir Thomas Clavering, a well-connected Whig, also stood, but unsuccessfully, with 1589 votes for Shafto, 1553 for Vane, and 1382 for Clavering.

In Parliament, Vane was generally a quiet administration supporter with some independent tendencies. He was favorable to the peace preliminaries in December 1762, but seconded the motion of his brother-in-law, Sir William Meredith, against the use of general warrants on John Wilkes and his followers in February 1764. Charles Jenkinson considered him a dissenting friend of the Grenville ministry. While considered by Rockingham a supporter of his ministry, Vane continued to support government when the Chatham ministry came in. He was returned without a contest for Durham in the 1768 British general election, together with Clavering, after Shafto stood down.

Though generally a supporter of the Grafton and North ministries, he periodically acted in opposition, as in 1769 and 1773, where he supported Wilkes on the issue of the Middlesex election. He rarely spoke in the House, but felt compelled in February 1771 to speak out against Meredith's unsuccessful but violent attempt to repeal a clause in the Nullum Tempus Act in the face of Administration.

Vane's most active engagement with public business came in 1773, when he spoke in the House on the actions of the British East India Company and was appointed to the committee to investigate them. He came to the conclusion that charges of misconduct against the company were well-founded and spoke several times during the debates leading to the Regulating Act 1773. He stood down at the 1774 British general election and took no further part in politics. Vane married Grace Lysaght, niece of John Lysaght, 1st Baron Lisle in 1797, and died on 28 April 1801.

Parliament of Great Britain
Preceded by Robert Shafto; Raby Vane	Member of Parliament for County Durham; 1761–1774; With: Robert Shafto 1761–1768; Sir Thomas Clavering 1768–1774	Succeeded by Sir Thomas Clavering; Sir John Eden
