= Henry Vane, 2nd Duke of Cleveland =

British Army general

General His Grace The Duke of Cleveland KG
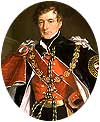
- Born: Henry Vane; 6 August 1788
- Died: 18 January 1864 (aged 75)
- Spouse: Sophia Poulett
- Military career
- Branch: British Army
- Service years: 1815–1860s
- Rank: General
- Unit: 75th Regiment of Foot

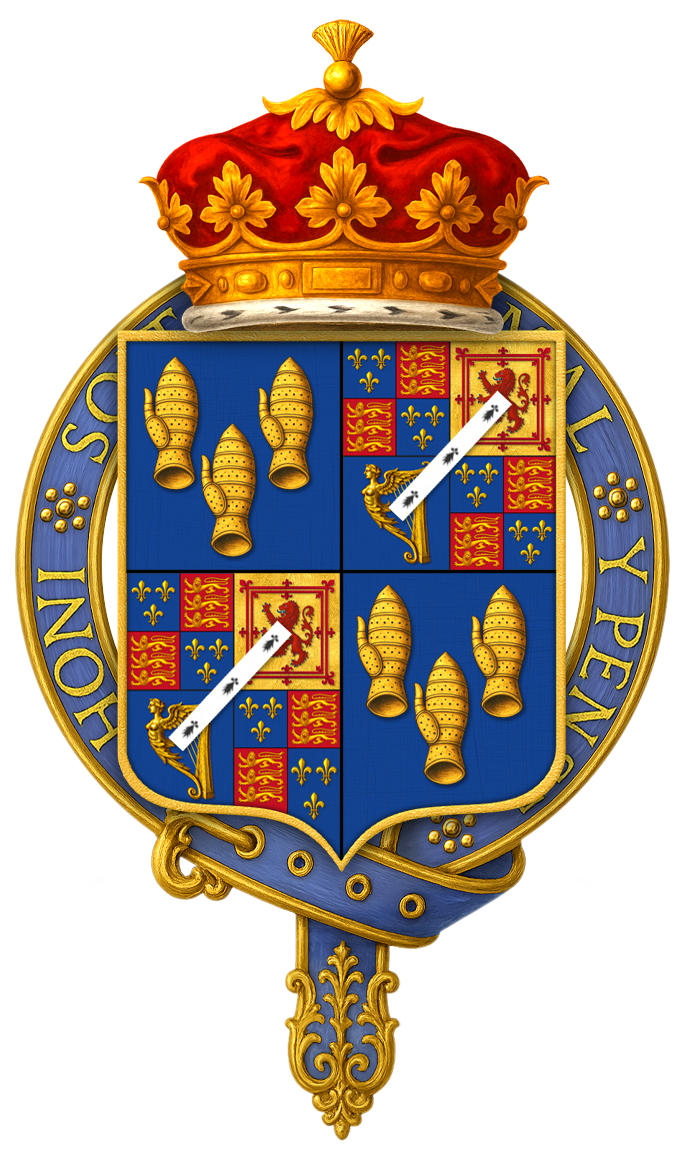
Quartered arms of Henry Vane, 2nd Duke of Cleveland, KG

General Henry Vane, 2nd Duke of Cleveland (6 August 1788 – 18 January 1864), was a British peer, politician and army officer.

Born The Honourable Henry Vane, he was the eldest son of William Vane, Viscount Barnard, and his first wife, Katherine, the second daughter of Harry Powlett, 6th Duke of Bolton. In 1792 his father inherited the earldom of Darlington from his father, whereupon Vane became Viscount Barnard.

In 1812 Barnard became Member of Parliament for County Durham, a seat he held until 1815. He was then MP for Winchelsea from 1816 to 1818, Tregony from 1818 to 1826, Totnes from 1826 to 1830, Saltash from 1830 to 1831 and finally for South Shropshire from 1832 to 1842. In 1827, Barnard's father was promoted in the Peerage as Marquess of Cleveland in 1827 and further as Duke of Cleveland in 1833, whereupon Barnard became Earl of Darlington after the first promotion.

In 1815 Darlington had joined the British Army, eventually rising through the ranks as a lieutenant-colonel in the 75th Regiment of Foot in 1824, major-general in 1851, lieutenant-general in 1857 and finally a general in 1863. In 1842, he inherited his father's titles and was also appointed a Knight of the Garter that year.

On 18 November 1809 at St George's, Hanover Square, Cleveland had married Lady Sophia Poulett (1785–1859), the eldest daughter of John Poulett, 4th Earl Poulett. He died childless in 1864 and his titles passed to his brother, William.

== Sources ==
- Cokayne et al., The Complete Peerage

Parliament of the United Kingdom
Preceded by Sir Ralph Milbanke and Sir Henry Vane-Tempest	Member of Parliament for County Durham; 1812–1815; With: Sir Henry Vane-Tempest 1812–13; John Lambton 1813–15	Succeeded by John Lambton and William Powlett
Preceded by Calverley Bewicke and Henry Brougham	Member of Parliament for Winchelsea; 1816–1818; With: Henry Brougham	Succeeded by Henry Brougham and George Galway Mills
Preceded by Alexander Grant and William Holmes	Member of Parliament for Tregony; 1818–1826; With: James O'Callaghan	Succeeded by Stephen Lushington and James Brougham
Preceded by Thomas Courtenay and John Bent	Member of Parliament for Totnes; 1826–1830; With: Thomas Courtenay	Succeeded by Thomas Courtenay and Charles Barry Baldwin
Preceded by Andrew Spottiswoode and Colin Macaulay	Member of Parliament for Saltash; 1830–1831; With: John Gregson 1830–31; Philip Cecil Crampton 1831	Succeeded by Frederick Villiers and Bethell Walrond
New constituency	Member of Parliament for South Shropshire; 1832–1842; Served alongside: Robert Clive	Succeeded by Robert Clive and Viscount Newport
Peerage of the United Kingdom
Preceded by William Vane	Duke of Cleveland; 1842–1864	Succeeded by William Vane
Professional and academic associations
Preceded by Charles William FitzWilliam, 3rd/5th Earl Fitzwilliam	President of the Surtees Society; 1846–49	Succeeded by Charles Thorp
