= Henry Vane, 2nd Earl of Darlington =

British peer

The Right Honourable The Earl of Darlington
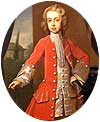
- Born: 1726
- Died: 8 September 1792 (aged 65–66); Raby Castle
- Burial place: Raby Castle
- Education: Christ Church, Oxford
- Children: 4, including William
- Military career
- Allegiance: Great Britain
- Branch: British Army
- Service years: 1745–1758
- Rank: Lieutenant-Colonel
- Unit: 1st Foot Guards

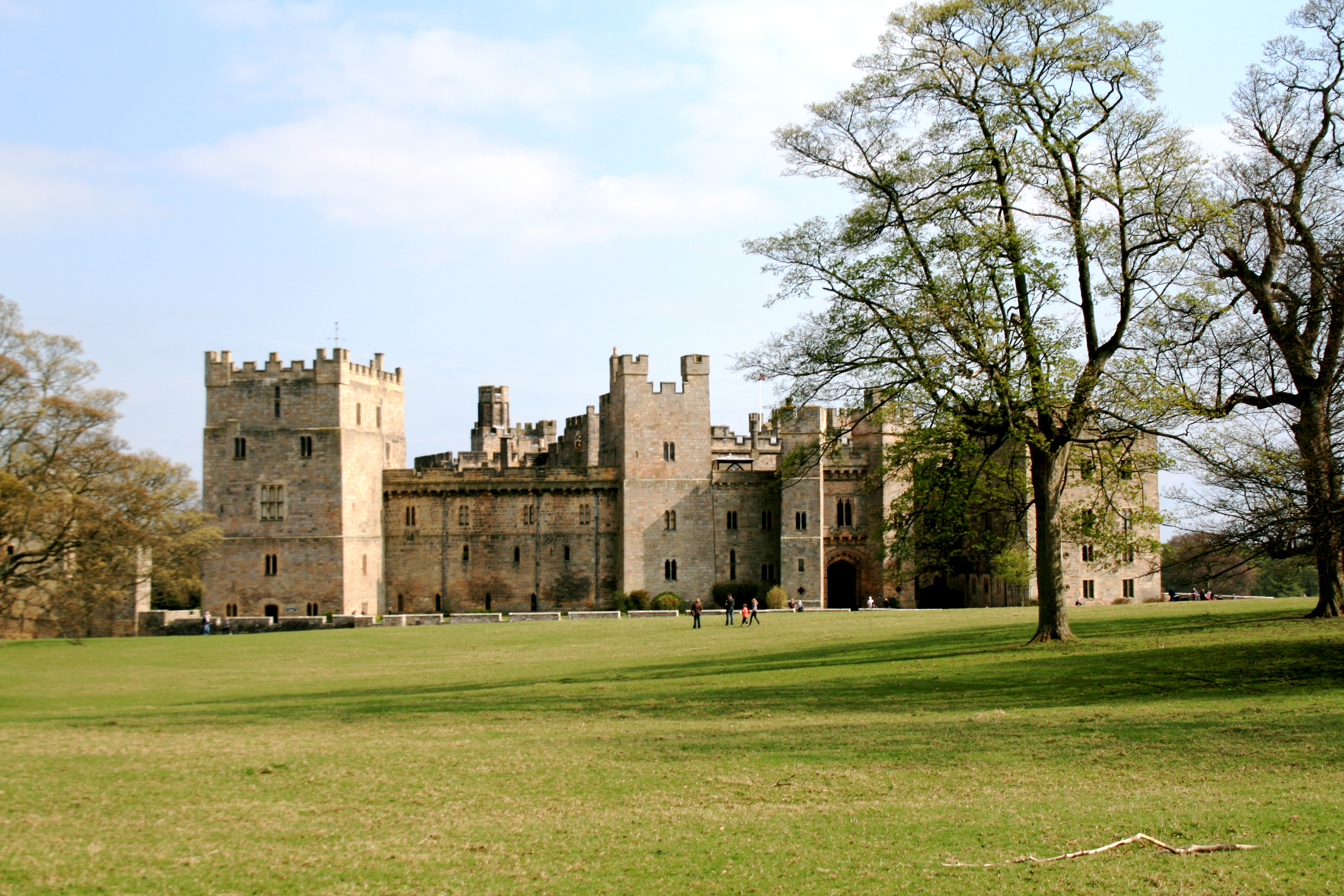
Raby Castle, seat of the Vane family

Henry Vane, 2nd Earl of Darlington (1726 – 8 September 1792) was a British peer.

== Life ==
He was the son of the 1st Earl of Darlington and educated at Christ Church, Oxford, graduating with a MA on 3 July 1749.

He joined the Army as an ensign in the 1st Regiment of Foot Guards in 1745. He was subsequently promoted lieutenant and captain, and went to the 2nd Regiment of Foot Guards as captain and lieutenant-colonel on 6 February 1750. Vane had also briefly served as Mayor of Hartlepool in 1751, like his father had. He retired from the army in June 1758, having succeeded as 2nd Earl of Darlington on the death of his father. He was then appointed Lord Lieutenant of County Durham from 1758-death, Governor of Carlisle from 1763-death and Master of the Jewel Office from 1763 to 1782.

From 1749 to 1753 he was Whig Member of Parliament (MP) for Downton and from 1753 to 1758 for County Durham. He had a London home at Grosvenor Square.

Having inherited Raby Castle, County Durham in 1758, Vane continued his father's work to convert the castle into a residential mansion with the help of architect John Carr. He died in 1792 at Raby Castle and was buried there. He was succeeded by his only son William Harry Vane, 3rd Earl of Darlington, who was later made Duke of Cleveland.

== Family ==
Vane married Margaret Lowther, a daughter of Robert Lowther, the governor of Barbados, on 19 March 1757 in London. They had four children:

- Lady Grace Vane (b. & d. 1757), died in infancy.
- Lady Margaret Vane (b 1758)
- Lady Elizabeth Vane (1759–1765), died young.
- William Vane, 1st Duke of Cleveland (1766–1842)

Parliament of Great Britain
Preceded by George Proctor; Richard Temple	Member of Parliament for Downton; 1749–1753; With: George Proctor 1749–1751; Thomas Duncombe 1751–1753	Succeeded by Thomas Duncombe; James Hayes
Preceded by George Bowes; The Hon. Henry Vane	Member of Parliament for County Durham; 1753–1758; With: George Bowes	Succeeded by George Bowes; The Hon. Raby Vane
Political offices
Preceded by Sir Robert Lyttleton	Master of the Jewel Office; 1763–1782	Succeeded by Post abolished
Military offices
Preceded by John Stanwix	Governor of Carlisle; 1763–1792	Succeeded by Montgomery Agnew
Honorary titles
Preceded by The Earl of Darlington	Lord Lieutenant of Durham; 1758–1792	Succeeded by The Earl of Darlington
Peerage of Great Britain
Preceded by Henry Vane	Earl of Darlington; 1758–1792	Succeeded by William Vane
