= John Tempest =

John Tempest may refer to:

- Sir John Tempest of Bracewell, MP for Yorkshire (UK Parliament constituency)
- John Tempest (died 1697), British Member of Parliament for the County of Durham, 1675–1679
- John Tempest (1679–1738), British Member of Parliament for the County of Durham, 1707–1708
- John Tempest, Sr. (1710–1776), British Member of Parliament for the City of Durham, 1742–1768
- John Tempest, Jr. (1739–1794), British Member of Parliament for the City of Durham, 1768–1794
