= The Red Boy =

1825 painting by Thomas Lawrence

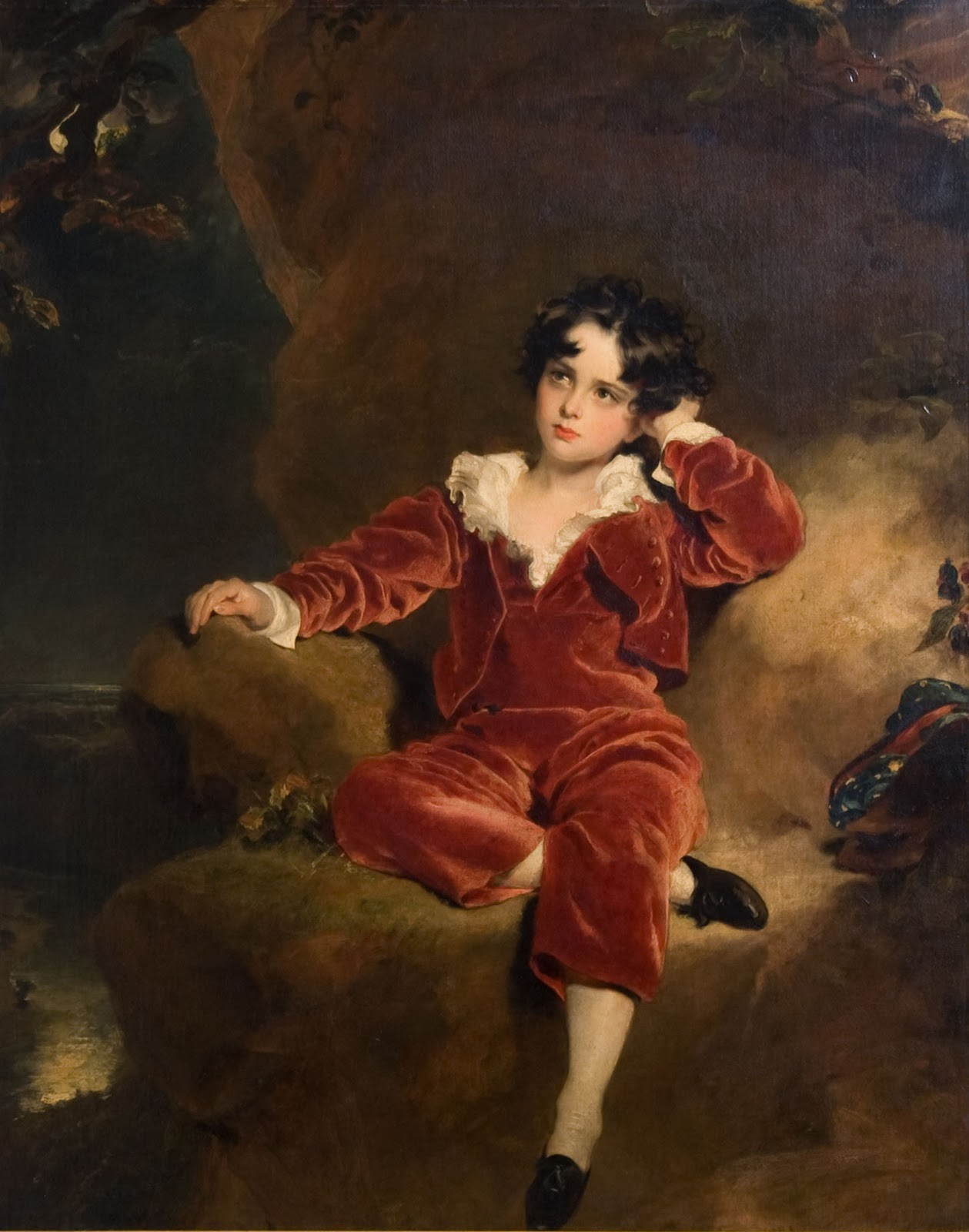
- Artist: Sir Thomas Lawrence
- Year: 1825
- Medium: Oil on canvas
- Dimensions: 137.2 cm × 111.8 cm (54.0 in × 44.0 in)
- Location: National Gallery, London

The Red Boy, or Master Lambton, are popular names for a portrait made in 1825 by Sir Thomas Lawrence. It is officially entitled with the name of its subject, Charles William Lambton, who was the elder son of John Lambton (later created Earl of Durham).

== Master Lambton ==
Charles William Lambton was born 16 January 1818, the elder son of John Lambton, who was then a Member of Parliament for County Durham, and his second wife, Lady Louisa Grey (daughter of Charles Grey, 2nd Earl Grey). He was baptised on 12 February 1818 at St Mary and St Cuthbert, Chester-le-Street, which at the time was the parish church of his family home, Lambton Castle. He was named for his grandfathers, Charles Grey, 2nd Earl Grey, who later became Prime Minister of the United Kingdom, and William Henry Lambton.

John Lambton was raised to the peerage as Baron Durham in 1828, whereupon Master Lambton became The Honourable Charles William Lambton and heir to his father's title and estates. However, Charles died young at Brighton on 24 September 1831, aged 13 from tuberculosis. He was buried at St Mary and St Cuthbert, Chester-le-Street on 7 October 1831. Charles's younger brother, D'Arcy, thus became the heir. After John Lambton was further created Earl of Durham in 1833, D'Arcy inherited the titles on the death of his father in 1840.

Master Lambton was the favorite grandchild of the 2nd Earl Grey.

== Early history ==
The portrait of seven-year-old Charles William Lambton was painted for the subject's father by Sir Thomas Lawrence for the price of 600 guineas (about £46,000/$57,000 in 2014) and was completed in 1825.

William T. Whitley's Art of England 1821–1837 (1930) states a contemporary writer in News of Literature and Fashion reported that Lawrence had originally painted the boy's clothes in yellow, despite the latter's father being called the "yellow dandy". John Lambton tormented Lawrence "on the score of the unfitness of the colour, until he got it blotted out by the crimson." Whitley also mentions that when the painting was exhibited at the Royal Academy in 1825, the Hanging Committee of George Jones, Alfred Edward Chalon and Thomas Phillips chose the painting to be hung high up in the School of Painting, away from the Great Room. Lambton believed this to be due to him being a Whig and declared he would never buy another picture from a Royal Academician. However, D. E. Williams's The Life and Correspondence of Sir Thomas Lawrence, Kt. published in 1831 claims that the original yellow "produced an unpleasant monotony with the browns of the gravel and rocks forming the background." The painting later attracted much praise when it was exhibited at the Paris Salon in 1827.

== Later history ==
The death of the third Earl of Durham in 1928 and the fourth earl a year later in 1929 brought large death duties. As the new fifth earl used Lambton Castle only occasionally, he closed it and held an auction of its valuable furniture and paintings in 1932, which included The Red Boy. However, after two years, the reserve was not met after each bid and the painting remained unsold in 1934.

In 1929, the painting was exhibited at the North East Coast Exhibition, then in 1934 at Bessie Surtees House, both in Newcastle Upon Tyne. It was also exhibited as part of an exhibition that ran alongside the Festival of Britain at Bowes Museum in 1951 and again there in 1988.

In July 2021 the National Gallery, London announced that it would acquire the painting from a private collection for £9.3 million, joining five other portraits by Lawrence in its collections.

== Reproduction ==
Albert Scholick Wilkin featured the painting on his Wilkins Red Boy Toffee.

Megan Marshall's The Peabody Sisters: Three Women Who Ignited American Romanticism (2005) mentions Sophia Hawthorne and Elizabeth Peabody as having copied the painting.

In 1936, Charles's great-niece, Diana Mary Lambton, married William Hedworth Williamson at St Margaret's, Westminster, and their pageboys wore matching outfits to the painting. Raymond Jolliffe (later Baron Hylton) also wore the same as a pageboy at Lord Lovat's wedding in 1938.

In 1967, the artwork became the first painting to appear on a British postage stamp.
