= Apreece =

Apreece may refer to:

- Apreece baronets, a title in the Baronetage of Great Britain created for Thomas Apreece
- Jane Apreece (1780–1855), British heiress and socialite

== See also ==
- Rhys#The patronymic form
