= William Bowes (MP for County Durham) =

English politician

Sir William Bowes
- Born: January 6, 1657
- Died: January 16, 1707 (aged 50)
- Occupations: British landowner and M.P.

Sir William Bowes (6 January 1657 – 16 January 1707) was a British landowner and M.P.

Sir William Bowes Kt. of Streatlam Castle was educated at Trinity College, Cambridge. He was one of the two Members of Parliament for County Durham during the second, third and fourth Parliaments of Charles II, and then again in the second Parliament of William III and first and second Parliaments of Queen Anne. His son George Bowes, later represented the County. Sir William married Elizabeth Blakiston of Gibside on 17 August 1691. She was the daughter of Sir Francis Blakiston and Ann Bowes who was the great granddaughter of Sir George Bowes of Bradley Hall. From this marriage came much of the wealth of the Bowes (later Bowes-Lyon) family as the Gibside estates lay over rich coal seams. The children of Sir William and Lady Bowes were William Blakiston, Thomas (d. 1722), George, Anne, Elizabeth, Jane and Margaret. George's daughter (Sir William's granddaughter) was Mary Eleanor Bowes (1745–1800) – in her day considered to be the "wealthiest woman in Europe".

Parliament of England
Preceded by John Tempest; Sir Robert Eden, Bt	Member of Parliament for County Durham; August 1679 – 1685; With: Thomas Fetherstonhalgh	Succeeded by Robert Byerley; William Lambton
Preceded by William Lambton; Sir Robert Eden, Bt	Member of Parliament for County Durham; 1695–1698; With: William Lambton	Succeeded by Lionel Vane; Sir Robert Eden, Bt
Preceded by William Lambton; Lionel Vane	Member of Parliament for County Durham; 1702–1707; With: Sir Robert Eden, Bt	Succeeded by John Tempest; Sir Robert Eden, Bt
