= William Vane, 1st Viscount Vane =

Irish Viscount (1682–1734)

The Right Honourable The Viscount Vane

Member of Parliament for Kent
- In office 1734–1734 Serving with Sir Edward Dering, Bt
- Preceded by: Sir Roger Meredith, Bt; Sir Edward Dering, Bt
- Succeeded by: Sir Edward Dering, Bt; Sir Christopher Powell, Bt

Member of Parliament for Steyning
- In office 1727–1734 Serving with Thomas Bladen
- Preceded by: John Gumley; William Stanhope
- Succeeded by: Sir Robert Fagg, Bt; Marquess of Carnarvon

Member of Parliament for County Durham
- In office 1708–1710 Serving with Sir Robert Eden, Bt
- Preceded by: Sir Robert Eden, Bt; John Tempest
- Succeeded by: Sir Robert Eden, Bt; William Lambton

Personal details
- Born: William Vane; 17 February 1682
- Died: 20 May 1734 (aged 52)
- Party: Whig
- Spouse: Lucy Jolliffe (m. 1703)
- Relations: Gilbert Holles, 3rd Earl of Clare (grandfather); John Holles, 1st Duke of Newcastle (uncle)
- Parent(s): Christopher Vane, 1st Baron Barnard; Lady Elizabeth Holles

William Vane, 1st Viscount Vane (1682 – 20 May 1734), of Fairlawn, Kent, was a British Whig politician who sat in the House of Commons between 1708 and 1734.

== Early life ==
Vane was baptized on 17 February 1682, the second surviving son of Christopher Vane, 1st Baron Barnard and Lady Elizabeth Holles. His father inherited Raby Castle, Durham and Fairlawne, Kent in 1662.

His paternal grandfather was Henry Vane the Younger who was beheaded at Tower Hill in 1662. His mother was a daughter of Gilbert Holles, 3rd Earl of Clare and the sister of John Holles, 1st Duke of Newcastle. He inherited a substantial fortune from his mother's family.

== Career ==
At the 1708 British general election, Vane was returned unopposed as Member of Parliament for County Durham on his father's interest. He was active as a teller for various electoral disputes and voted for the naturalization of the Palatines, and for the impeachment of Dr Sacheverell. At the 1710 British general election, his father decided to drop him, so he did not stand.

In 1720 Vane was raised to the Peerage of Ireland as Baron Vane, of Dungannon in the County of Tyrone, and Viscount Vane. These titles did not disqualify him from sitting in the House of Commons. He succeeded his father in 1723.

At the 1727 British general election Vane was successfully returned in a contest for Steyning. At the 1734 British general election he was defeated at Steyning but returned in a contest as MP for Kent. However, he died suddenly only five days later.

== Personal life ==
In 1703, he married Lucy Joliffe, daughter of Sir William Joliffe, of Caverswall Castle, Staffordshire. The settlement, dated 15 November 1703, included Fairlawn, Kent, and lands in Durham, providing Vane with £600 p.a. for himself and his wife. After the marriage, Vane's father refused to include Fairlawn in the settlement, and took "great displeasure" and stopped the allowance when his son took legal advice. The case came before the House of Lords and the settlement was confirmed. Vane kept possession of Fairlawn. Together, they were the parents of:

- Christopher Vane, who predeceased Lord Vane.
- John Vane, who predeceased Lord Vane.
- William Vane, 2nd Viscount Vane (1714–1789), who married Frances, Lady William Hamilton who was previously married to the 4th Duke of Hamilton's second son, Lord William Hamilton.

Vane died of apoplexy on 20 May 1734 at Fairlawn, Shipbourne, Kent, where he was buried on 5 June. He was succeeded in the viscountcy by his only surviving son, William. Lady Vane died in March 1742.

Parliament of Great Britain
Preceded by Sir Robert Eden, Bt; John Tempest	Member of Parliament for County Durham; 1708–1710; With: Sir Robert Eden, Bt	Succeeded by Sir Robert Eden, Bt; William Lambton
Preceded by John Gumley; William Stanhope	Member of Parliament for Steyning; 1727–1734; With: Thomas Bladen	Succeeded by Sir Robert Fagg, Bt; Marquess of Carnarvon
Preceded by Sir Roger Meredith, Bt; Sir Edward Dering, Bt	Member of Parliament for Kent; 15–20 May 1734; With: Sir Edward Dering, Bt	Succeeded by Sir Edward Dering, Bt; Sir Christopher Powell, Bt
Peerage of Ireland
New creation	Viscount Vane; 1720–1734	Succeeded by William Vane
