= Vane-Tempest baronets =

Escutcheon of the Vane-Tempest baronets of Long Newton

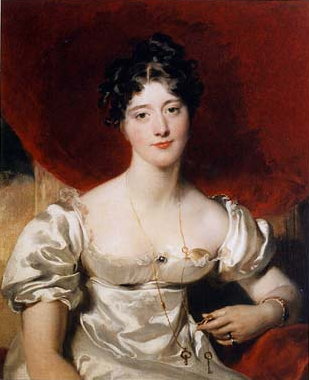
Frances Vane-Tempest, daughter and heiress of Sir Henry Vane-Tempest, 2nd Baronet, 1818 portrait before she married, later Frances Vane, Marchioness of Londonderry

The Vane, later Vane-Tempest, baronetcy, of Long Newton in the County of Durham, was a title in the Baronetage of Great Britain. The Vane baronetcy was created on 13 July 1782 for the cleric and academic Rev. Henry Vane, LL.D., Fellow of Trinity College, Cambridge from 1752 and prebendary of Durham Cathedral from 1758. He was the second son of George Vane of Long Newton; and the grandson of Lionel Vane, Member of Parliament for County Durham who as one of the Hostmen of Newcastle upon Tyne was engaged in the coal trade, and was a nephew of Henry Vane the younger, the regicide. He married Frances Tempest, daughter of John Tempest of Sherburne, Durham.

John Tempest Jr., the Rev. Henry Vane's brother-in-law, died in 1794, the same year as the 1st Baronet, having lost his young son and heir in 1793. The 2nd Baronet, Tempest's heir, then in 1795 assumed by Royal licence the additional surname of Tempest in accordance with his uncle's will, which left him a landowner in County Durham with coal mines at Pittington and Rainton. He represented both the city and county of Durham in Parliament. By his marriage to Anne MacDonnell, 2nd Countess of Antrim he had one daughter, and on his death the baronetcy was extinct.

== Vane, later Vane-Tempest, baronets, of Long Newton (1782) ==
- Sir Henry Vane, 1st Baronet (c. 1725–1794)
- Sir Henry Vane-Tempest, 2nd Baronet (died 1813)

== See also ==
- Baron Barnard
- Marquess of Londonderry
- Earl of Antrim

Baronetage of Great Britain
Preceded by Apreece baronets	Vane baronets of Long Newton; 13 July 1782	Succeeded by Kent baronets
