= Robert Byerley =

English soldier and politician

- Born: 1660
- Died: 1714 (aged 53–54)
- Occupations: Soldier and Politician

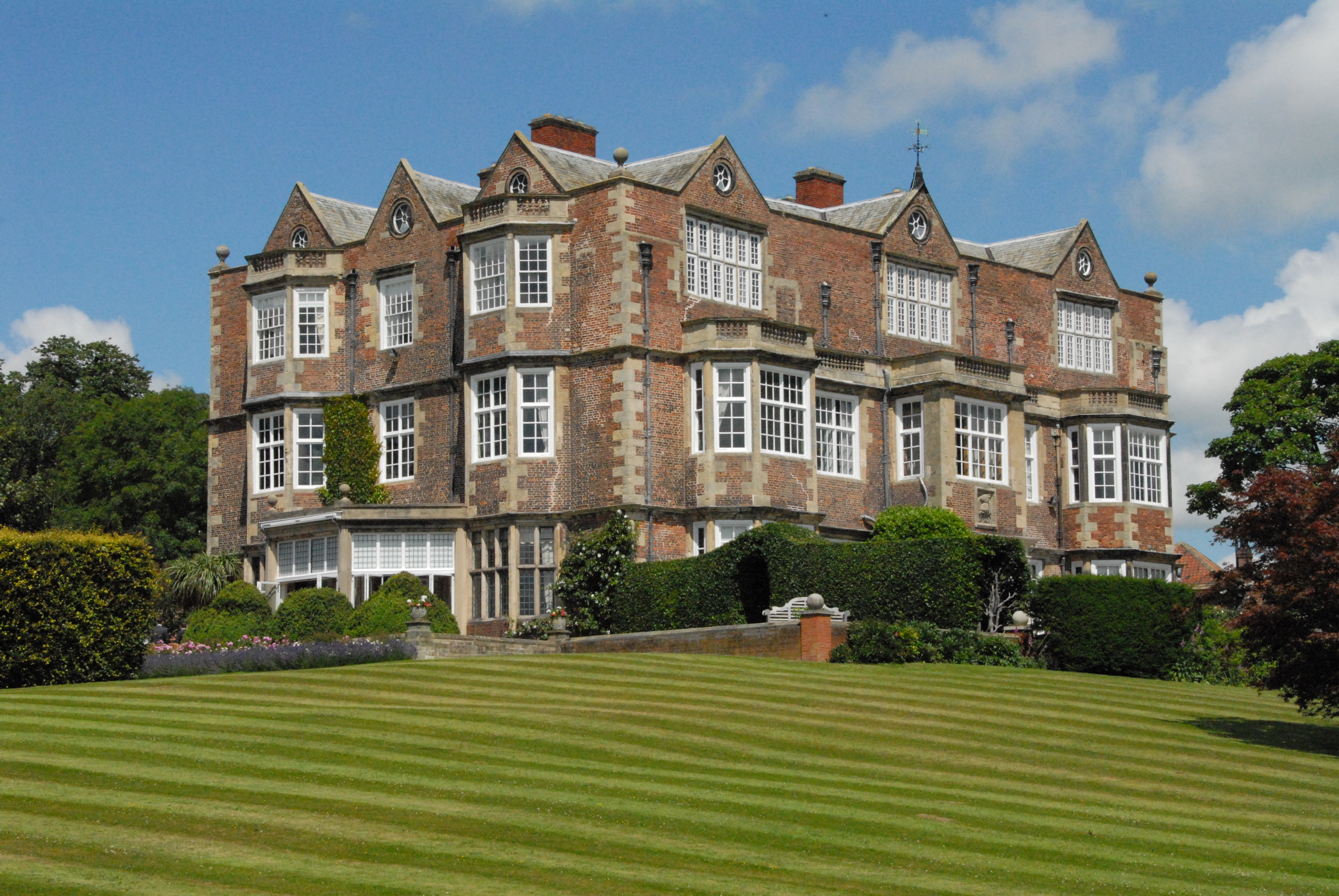
Goldsborough Hall

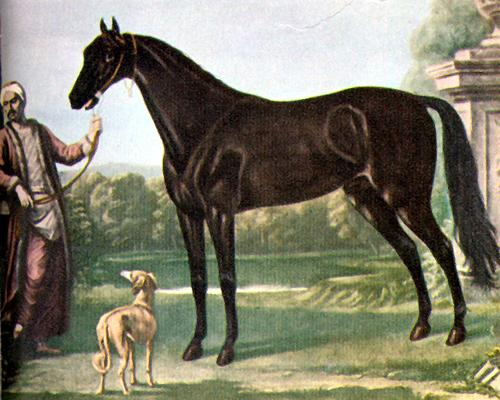
The Byerley Turk

Robert Byerley (1660–1714), of Middridge Grange, Heighington, County Durham, and Goldsborough, Yorkshire, was an English soldier and Tory politician who sat in the English and British House of Commons between 1685 and 1714. He is credited with capturing the Byerley Turk, a famous stallion considered one of the three major foundation sires of the Thoroughbred breed of race horse.

Byerley was the fourth, but second surviving son of Anthony Byerley of Middridge Grange, Heighington, county Durham, and his wife Anne Hutton, daughter of Col Sir Richard Hutton of Goldsborough Hall. He matriculated at Queen's College, Oxford in 1677.

As a soldier, Byerley was a captain of an independent troop in 1685 and a member of Queen Dowager's Horse (later the 6th Dragoon Guards) from 1685 to 1687. He was promoted lieutenant-colonel in 1689 and colonel in 1689–1692. Although he was said to have fought at the Battle of Buda in 1686, there is no actual evidence that he fought abroad. There is evidence, however that he fought Battle of the Boyne in 1690. He is famous for owning the Byerley Turk, one of the three founding stallions of all thoroughbred horses in the world, whose origins are still uncertain.

Byerley was elected Tory Member of Parliament for County Durham in 1685 and 1689. He was then returned for Knaresborough in 1695, 1698, Feb and Dec 1701, 1702, 1705, 1708, 1710 and 1713.

Byerley was resident of Goldsborough Hall, near Knaresborough in Yorkshire, which he inherited from his wife's family. He married his cousin Mary Wharton, the divorced wife of James Campbell of Burnbank, Lanarkshire and daughter and heiress of the Hon Philip Wharton, of Edlington, Yorkshire, son of Sir Thomas Wharton, on 17 March 1692. Mary was just 13 years old when she was abducted from her carriage and forced to marry Campbell. Her two-day marriage was annulled by an Act of Parliament in 1690. They had two sons and three daughters, none of whom had any children. As there were no heirs to inherit the Goldsborough estate, the Hall and lands were sold to Daniel Lascelles around 1760.

Parliament of England
Preceded by William Bowes; Thomas Fetherstonhalgh	Member of Parliament for County Durham; 1685–1690; With: William Lambton	Succeeded by Sir Robert Eden, Bt; William Lambton
Preceded by Christopher Stockdale; Thomas Fawkes	Member of Parliament for Knaresborough; 1695–1707; With: Christopher Stockdale	Succeeded by Parliament of Great Britain
Parliament of Great Britain
Preceded by Parliament of England	Member of Parliament for Knaresborough; 1707–1714; With: Christopher Stockdale 1707-1714; Francis Fawkes 1714	Succeeded by Francis Fawkes; Henry Slingsby
