= John Lambton (British Army officer) =

British Army officer and politician

General John Lambton

Member of Parliament for Durham City
- In office 1762–1787 Serving with John Tempest, Sr. (1762–1768); John Tempest, Jr. (1768–1787)

Personal details
- Born: 26 July 1710
- Died: 22 March 1794 (aged 83)
- Spouse: Susan Lyon (m. 1763)
- Children: 4+, including William
- Parent: Ralph Lambton (father)
- Relatives: Henry Lambton (brother); William Lambton (uncle); John Lambton (grandson)
- Military career
- Branch: British Army
- Rank: General
- Unit: Coldstream Guards
- Commands: 68th Foot

General John Lambton (26 July 1710 – 22 March 1794) of Harraton Hall, later of Lambton Castle, County Durham, was a senior officer in the British Army and a Member of Parliament.

== Life ==
Lambton was the fourth son of Ralph Lambton (c. 1651–1717) and educated at Westminster School.

He was commissioned as an ensign in the Coldstream Guards in 1732, then promoted to lieutenant in 1739, captain and lieutenant-colonel in 1746 and colonel of the 68th Foot in 1758, a position he held until his death. He was made a full general on 20 November 1782.

He was Member of Parliament for Durham City from 1762 to 1787.

He died on 22 March 1794.

== Family ==
He married Lady Susan Lyon (died 1769), daughter of Thomas Lyon, 8th Earl of Strathmore and Kinghorne, in 1763. Their children included:

- William Henry Lambton of Lambton (1764–1797), who succeeded him as MP for Durham City and father of the First Earl of Durham
- Susan Mary Anne Lambton, who married John Wharton, MP
- Ralph John Lambton (c. 1767–1844), also MP for Durham City
- Jane Dorothy Lambton

== Notes ==
Parliament of Great Britain
Preceded by John Tempest, Sr. Ralph Gowland	Member of Parliament for Durham City; 1762–1787; With: John Tempest, Sr. 1762–1768; John Tempest, Jr. 1768–1787	Succeeded by John Tempest, Jr. William Henry Lambton
Military offices
New regiment	Colonel of the 68th Regiment of Foot; 1758–1794	Succeeded by John Mansel
