= Christopher Vane, 1st Baron Barnard =

English politician and peer

The Right Honourable The Lord Barnard PC
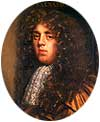

Member of the English Parliament for County Durham
- In office October 1675 – February 1679 Serving with John Tempest
- Preceded by: John Tempest Thomas Vane
- Succeeded by: Sir Robert Eden, Bt

Member of the English Parliament for Boroughbridge
- In office January 1689 – November 1690 Serving with Sir Henry Goodricke, 2nd Baronet
- Preceded by: Thomas Mauleverer
- Succeeded by: Brian Stapylton

Personal details
- Born: Christopher Vane; 21 May 1653
- Died: 28 October 1723 (aged 70) Shipbourne, Kent, England
- Relations: Sir Christopher Wray (grandfather); Anne Vane (granddaughter); William Vane, 2nd Viscount Vane (grandson)
- Children: William Vane, 1st Viscount Vane; Henry Vane; Gilbert Vane, 2nd Baron Barnard
- Parent(s): Henry Vane the Younger; Frances Wray

Christopher Vane, 1st Baron Barnard (21 May 1653 – 28 October 1723), was an English peer. He served in Parliament for Durham after his brother, Thomas, died 4 days after being elected the MP for Durham. Then, again from January 1689 to November 1690 for Boroughbridge. He served in the Commons as a Whig collaborator during the passage of the Bill of Rights which his father, Sir Henry Vane the Younger, had fought for religious and civil liberty before his beheading in 1662. He is known for his disputes with his heirs and for employing Peter Smart, father of the poet Christopher Smart, as a steward.

== Early life ==
Arms of Vane: Azure, three sinister gauntlets (appaumée) or These are a difference of the arms of the Fane family, Earls of Westmorland from 1624, which show: three dexter gauntlets back affrontée, with identical tinctures

Christopher Vane was the son of Henry Vane the Younger and Frances Wray, daughter of Sir Christopher Wray. He inherited Raby Castle, Durham, and Fairlawne, Kent, on the beheading of his father at Tower Hill in 1662.

== Career ==
Vane was MP for County Durham from 1675 to 1679, and a Whig sitting for Boroughbridge from January 1689 to November 1690 (removed by petition of Sir Brian Stayplton). He was made a Privy counsellor in July 1688, and in 1698, was created Baron Barnard of Barnard Castle by William III.

During his time at Raby Castle, Christopher hired John Bazire and Peter Smart, father of Christopher Smart. A struggle between his wife and his daughter-in-law Lucy Jolliffe ensued after 1703 and Christopher refused to pay the inheritance annuity to his son, William, after William was to be given the Fairlawne estate. Christopher accomplished this task by giving Fairlawne and Raby Castle to John Bazire and Peter Smart "for the use of the said Lord Barnard and his heirs forever." William took a lawsuit over the inheritance to the House of Lords, and during this time Christopher and his wife lived at Raby Castle.

== Family ==
On 9 May 1676, he married Elizabeth Holles, daughter of Gilbert Holles, 3rd Earl of Clare. There was immediate bad feeling between Christopher and Elizabeth, on one side, and her brother and co-heir John Holles, 1st Duke of Newcastle-upon-Tyne. They had three children:

- Henry Vane (1676–1676), died in infancy.
- Gilbert Vane, 2nd Baron Barnard (1678–1753), married to Mary Randyll (1681–1728), mother of Anne, mistress of Frederick, Prince of Wales.
- William Vane, 1st Viscount Vane (c. 1680–1734), married to Lucy Jolliffe.

=== Later years ===
When his son Gilbert married Mary Randyll, Elizabeth started a quarrel with her daughter-in-law, which forced Christopher and Elizabeth to move back to Fairlawne. Mary was described as "scandalous" by Christopher Vane (and it was thought that her daughter, Anne Vane, followed her mother's example. In 1712, Christopher hired John Proud, the steward of Raby Castle, to engage 200 workmen to strip the castle. Owen Stanley Scott described the way that the castle was stripped:

"of its lead, glass, doors, and furniture, even pulling up the floors, cutting down the timber, and destroying the deer, and 'of a sudden in three days' did damage to the tune of £3000, holding a sale at which the household goods, lead, etc., were sold for what they would fetch"

In response, Gilbert sued Christopher for the damages to the castle in the case Vane vs. Lord Barnard 1716.

He died on 28 October 1723, aged 70 at Shipbourne, Kent, and was buried in the parish church. He wrote in a codicil to his will that Peter Smart would receive £40 a year. Also, he bequeathed £200 to Christopher Smart and £50 to the other children of Peter Smart. The reason for Christopher Smart's legacy has been seen by some as a sign that the future poet was "the pride of Fairlawne"; others disagree without an offered explanation. Christopher Smart never received this money, as it was tied up and lost in a court battle. In response to this loss, Henry Vane, 1st Earl of Darlington, Christopher's grandson through Gilbert, took the young Christopher Smart in at Raby Castle and paid for his education at Durham School.

== Notes ==
Parliament of England
Preceded by John Tempest; Thomas Vane	Member of Parliament for County Durham; October 1675 – February 1679; With: John Tempest	Succeeded by John Tempest; Sir Robert Eden, Bt
Preceded by Sir Thomas Mauleverer, 3rd Baronet	Member of Parliament for County Yorkshire; January 1689 – November 1690; With: Sir Henry Goodricke, 2nd Baronet	Succeeded by Sir Henry Goodricke, 2nd Baronet; Sir Brian Stapylton, Bt
Peerage of England
New creation	Baron Barnard; 1698–1723	Succeeded by Gilbert Vane
