= John Tempest (died 1697) =

English politician (died 1697)

John Tempest (died 26 July 1697) was an English politician, elected as the first Member of Parliament for the County of Durham on 21 June 1675.

== Life ==
He was the son of Sir Thomas Tempest Kt. (1594–1653), Attorney-General of Durham and later Ireland and Eleanor daughter of William Tempest of Hadham (Oxfordshire). He was styled "of the Isle" (a manor west of Bradbury, County Durham) and in right of his wife Elizabeth (daughter and sole heiress of John Heath), later of Old Durham.

He matriculated 1637 at The Queen's College, Oxford. A royalist, he was Colonel of a regiment of foot in the service of Charles I. As part of the Marquess of Newcastle's army, he was present at the battle of Northallerton (1644) and the battle of Marston Moor, and the siege of Skipton Castle.

He was nominated a Knight of the Royal Oak in 1661. He became Vice Lord Lieutenant of Durham in 1662, and Governor of Kepier School.

In the election for two members, they were John Tempest, with 1034 votes, and Thomas Vane of Raby Castle with 856 votes. Thomas Vane died of smallpox four days after his election and was succeeded by his younger brother Christopher Vane.

He died 26 July 1697, and was buried at Forcett (North Yorkshire).

Parliament of England
New constituency	Member of Parliament for County Durham; June 1675 – August 1679; With: Thomas Vane June 1675; Christopher Vane October 1675 – February 1679; Sir Robert Eden, Bt February–August 1679	Succeeded by William Bowes; Thomas Fetherstonhalgh
