= Sir Henry Vane-Tempest, 2nd Baronet =

British politician

Sir Henry Vane-Tempest Bt
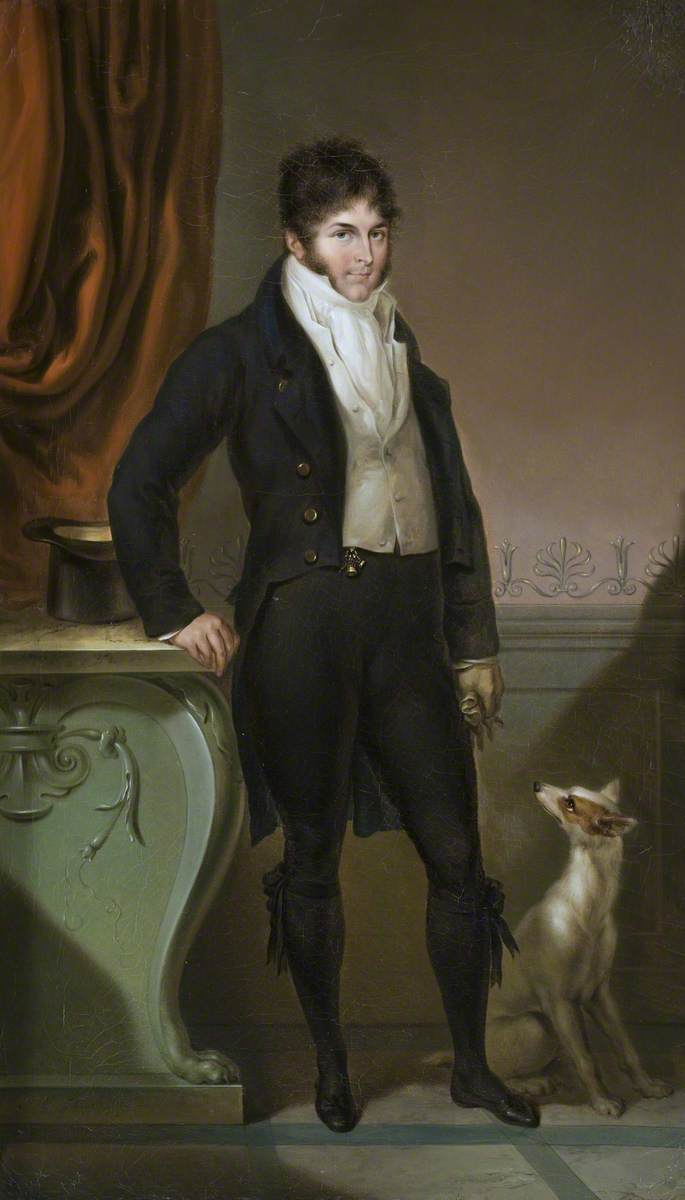

Member of Parliament for City of Durham
- In office 1794–1800

Member of Parliament for County Durham
- In office 1807–1813

Personal details
- Born: Henry Vane; 25 January 1771
- Died: 1 August 1813 (aged 42)
- Spouse: Anne MacDonnell, 2nd Countess of Antrim (m. 1799)
- Children: Frances Vane, Marchioness of Londonderry
- Parents: Sir Henry Vane, 1st Baronet; Frances Tempest

Military service
- Rank: Lieutenant-Colonel
- Unit: Durham Volunteer Cavalry

Sir Henry Vane-Tempest, 2nd Baronet (25 January 1771 – 1 August 1813), was a British politician. In early life his name was Henry Vane. He changed his name to Vane-Tempest when he inherited from his maternal uncle, John Tempest Jr., in 1793.

== Early life ==
He was the only son, and heir, of the former Frances Tempest and the Rev. Sir Henry Vane, 1st Baronet (1728–1794), the Prebendary of Durham.

A descendant of Sir Henry Vane the Elder through his second son, Sir George Vane, his paternal grandparents were George Vane of Long Newton and Anne Machon (a daughter of William Machon). His maternal grandparents were Frances (née Shuttleworth) Tempest and John Tempest Sr., MP for City of Durham.

== Career ==
Vane was Member of Parliament (MP) for the City of Durham from 1794 to 1800, replacing his uncle John Tempest Jr., who died in a riding accident in 1793. Vane inherited the Tempest estates in County Durham (notably Wynyard and Brancepeth) upon condition he adopt the name and arms of Tempest. He therefore changed his surname to Vane-Tempest.

He accepted the Chiltern Hundreds in 1800 before returning to Parliament as representative for the County Durham from 1807 until his death from apoplexy in 1813. He was appointed High Sheriff of Antrim in 1805.

Vane-Tempest inherited his father's baronetcy in 1794. He was appointed lieutenant-colonel of the Durham volunteer cavalry in early 1797.

Vane-Tempest was a renowned sportsman of his day, owning the celebrated racehorse Hambletonian. In a match with Mr. Cookson's Diamond over the Beacon Course at Newmarket in 1799, Hambletonian won by a neck, Sir Henry having wagered 3,000 guineas on the outcome. The aftermath is the subject of George Stubbs' painting "Hambletonian Rubbing Down", which is preserved at Mount Stewart.

== Personal life ==
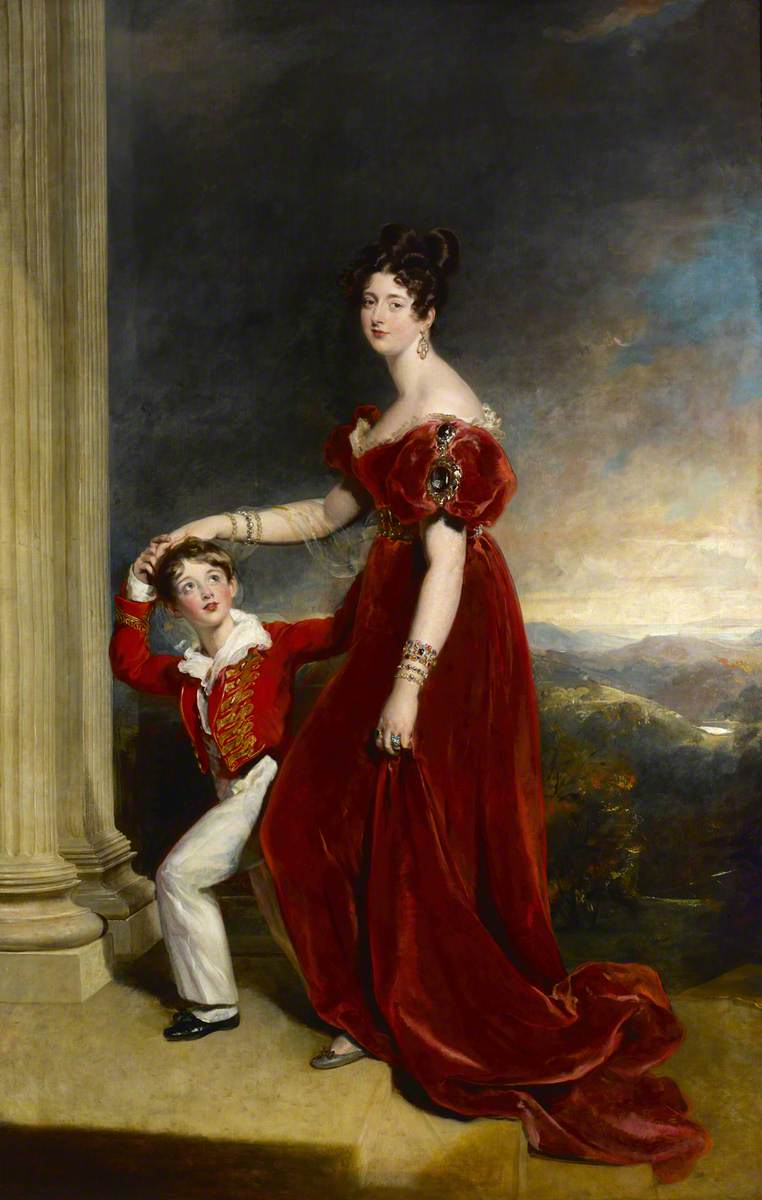
Portrait of his daughter, Frances Vane, Marchioness of Londonderry, and grandson, George, by Sir Thomas Lawrence, 1828

On 25 April 1799, by special licence, Vane-Tempest married Anne MacDonnell, 2nd Countess of Antrim, at her mother's house in Hanover Square. She was the eldest daughter of Randal MacDonnell, 1st Marquess of Antrim, and the Hon. Letitia (née Morres) Trevor (widow of the Hon. Arthur Trevor and daughter of the 1st Viscount Mountmorres). His wife had inherited her father's peerages upon his death in 1791 under the special remainder of 1785, becoming suo jure Countess of Antrim and Viscountess Dunluce while the marquessate of Antrim became extinct. Together, they had one child:

- Lady Frances Anne Vane-Tempest (1800–1865), who married Lord Charles Stewart (later Vane), the second son of Robert Stewart, 1st Marquess of Londonderry, and the first son by his second wife, Frances Pratt, in 1819.

Sir Henry died on 1 August 1813 and was buried at Long Newton. On Vane-Tempest's death without a male heir in 1813, the baronetcy became extinct. The surname Vane, however, was preserved as he had stipulated in his last will and testament that his daughter must keep her surname and her future husband must adopt hers in lieu of his own in order to inherit the extensive landholdings. This provision was complied with when Lady Frances married Lord Charles Stewart in 1819. Charles Stewart became Charles Vane and the name Vane ultimately passed into the family of the marquesses of Londonderry. Sir Henry's widow married on 27 June 1817, by special licence, Edmund Phelps, who took the name of McDonnell by royal licence on 27 June 1817.

=== Descendants ===
Through his only daughter, Lady Frances, he was posthumously a grandfather of George Vane-Tempest, 5th Marquess of Londonderry, Lady Frances Anne Emily Vane (wife of John Spencer-Churchill, 7th Duke of Marlborough), Lady Alexandrina Octavia Maria Vane (godchild of Czar Alexander I of Russia; she married Henry Dawson-Damer, 3rd Earl of Portarlington), Lord Adolphus Vane-Tempest, and Lady Adelaide Emelina Caroline Vane (who eloped with her brother's tutor, Rev. Frederick Henry Law).

Parliament of Great Britain
Preceded by John Tempest Jr. William Henry Lambton	Member of Parliament for the City of Durham; 1794–1800; With: William Henry Lambton until 1798; Ralph John Lambton from 1798	Succeeded by Ralph John Lambton; Michael Angelo Taylor
Parliament of the United Kingdom
Preceded by Sir Ralph Milbanke, Bt; Sir Thomas Liddell, Bt	Member of Parliament for County Durham; 1807–1813; With: Viscount Barnard	Succeeded by Viscount Barnard; John Lambton
Baronetage of Great Britain
Preceded by Henry Vane	Baronet of Long Newton; 1794–1813	Extinct
