= Elizabeth Vane, Lady Barnard =

English noblewoman

Elizabeth Vane, Lady Barnard, formerly Lady Elizabeth Holles (c. 1657 – 9 November 1725) was an English noblewoman, the wife of Christopher Vane, 1st Baron Barnard. Her disputes with her family led to a noted court case, and her ghost is reputed to haunt Raby Castle, near Durham.

Elizabeth was the daughter of Gilbert Holles, 3rd Earl of Clare, and his wife, the former Grace Pierrepont. After her marriage to Vane in 1676, she fell out with her younger brother and co-heir, John Holles, 1st Duke of Newcastle-upon-Tyne, who inherited their father's title. They had three children:

A family dispute began when Lord Barnard's heir, Gilbert, decided to marry Mary Randyll. Mary, the daughter of politician Morgan Randyll, was described as "scandalous" by Christopher Vane, and it would later be thought that Gilbert and Mary's daughter, Anne Vane, had followed her mother's example when she became a mistress of Frederick, Prince of Wales. Christopher instructed John Proud, the steward of Raby Castle, to engage 200 workmen for the purpose of dismantling the castle so that Gilbert would have nothing to inherit. In 1714 the couple arranged for the castle to be stripped:

"of its lead, glass, doors, and furniture, even pulling up the floors, cutting down the timber, and destroying the deer, and 'of a sudden in three days' did damage to the tune of £3000, holding a sale at which the household goods, lead, etc., were sold for what they would fetch"

Gilbert sued Christopher for the damages to the castle in the case Vane vs. Lord Barnard 1716, and won. The Court of Chancery decided that the castle must be restored to its original condition, at Lord Barnard's expense. For her part in the dispute, Elizabeth gained the nickname "Old Hell-Cat". She died two years after her husband and was buried with him at Shipbourne, where their effigies may still be seen.
