= John Hedworth =

British Member of Parliament (1683–1747)

John Hedworth (10 July 1683 – 31 May 1747), of Chester Deanery, Durham, was a British colliery owner and politician who sat in the House of Commons for 34 years from 1713 to 1747.

== Early life ==
Hedworth was baptized on 10 July 1683, the eldest surviving son of Ralph Hedworth of Chester Deanery and his wife Eleanor Lambton, daughter of Henry Lambton of Lambton Hall, county Durham. His family were leading coal owners in Sunderland. He matriculated at Lincoln College, Oxford on 18 March 1700, aged 16, and was admitted at Middle Temple in 1700. In 1705 he succeeded to the estates, and notably the coalfields, of his father. He married by a settlement dated 28 August 1714, Susanna Sophia Pleasant, daughter of William Pleasant, merchant, of London.

== Career ==
In 1711 coal owners from Northumberland sought the support of their Durham counterparts in opposing a bill in Parliament to prevent combinations in the coal trade and specifically approached Hedworth as a leading figure. He was then returned unopposed as Member of Parliament for County Durham at the 1713 general election. He was not very active MP but voted against the expulsion of Richard Steele on 18 March 1714. He was lobbied to oppose a petition proposed by William Wrightson to make the way-leaves on the Tyne free and was involved in helping to draft a bill enabling the endowment of poor vicarages. His politics seem to have been somewhat unfathomable, as he was classed in various lists as a Whig, as a Tory, and as a Whig who often voted with the Tories.

Hedworth was returned as a Whig at the 1715 general election but continued to show himself as of an independent mind. In that Parliament, he voted with the Opposition in almost all recorded divisions. He was Mayor of Hartlepool for the year 1716 to 1717. He was returned to Parliament again at the general elections in 1722 and 1727, and his only recorded vote was against the Government on the Excise Bill in 1733. He was Mayor of Hartlepool again for the year 1728 to 1729 and became a freeman of Newcastle upon Tyne in 1731. After he was returned at the 1734 general election, he voted for the Government on the Spanish convention in 1739 and against them on the place bill in 1740. He was Mayor of Hartlepool for a third time for the year 1740 to 1741 and was returned as MP for County Durham at the 1741 general election. He supported the Government with regard to the chairman of the elections committee on 16 December 1741, and in October 1742 was put down as a Pelham supporter. He voted for the Hanoverians in only one of the divisions in 1744 and was classed as Old Whig in 1746.

== Later life and legacy ==
Hedworth married as his second wife Margaret Ayton (died 1731), daughter of Samuel Ayton of West Herrington, County Durham on 14 August 1729. He died ‘of a violent colic’ on 31 May 1747. He had one daughter by each of his two wives, Eleanor and Elizabeth, respectively, and his estate passed to them. The elder married Sir Richard Hylton, 5th Baronet, formerly Musgrave, whose only surviving daughter, Eleanor married William Jolliffe, and was mother of Hylton Jolliffe. The younger married Sir Ralph Milbanke, 5th Baronet MP.

Parliament of Great Britain
Preceded by Sir Robert Eden, Bt; William Lambton	Member of Parliament for County Durham; 1713–1747; With: Sir John Eden 1713-1727; George Bowes 1727-1747	Succeeded by George Bowes; Hon. Henry Vane
