= Bobby Shafto =

British politician (c.1732–1797)

Robert Shafto

Member of Parliament for County Durham
- In office 1760–1768
- Preceded by: George Bowes
- Succeeded by: Sir Thomas Clavering

Member of Parliament for Downton
- In office 1780–1790
- Preceded by: Hon. Bartholomew Bouverie
- Succeeded by: Hon. Bartholomew Bouverie

Robert Shafto (sometimes spelt Shaftoe) (c. 1732 – 24 November 1797) was a British politician who sat in the House of Commons between 1760 and 1790. He was the likely subject of a famous North East English folk song and nursery rhyme, "Bobby Shafto's Gone to Sea" (Roud #1359).

== Biography ==
Robert Shafto was born around 1732 the son of John Shafto and his wife Mary Jackson, daughter of Thomas Jackson of Nunnington, Yorkshire at his family seat of Whitworth near Spennymoor in County Durham. He was educated at Westminster School from 1740 to 1749, when he entered Balliol College, Oxford.

He succeeded to the family estates on the death of his father John in 1742. Both his father and uncle Robert Shafto had been Tory Members of Parliament. He continued this tradition, becoming one of the two members for County Durham in 1760, using his nickname "Bonny Bobby Shafto" and the now famous song for electioneering purposes, defeating the Whig Sir Thomas Clavering, with a campaign supported by Thomas Pelham-Holles, Duke of Newcastle, who was the prime minister, Henry Vane, first earl of Darlington, and the bishop of Durham. However, once in parliament he dropped this allegiance, supporting the administrations of John Stuart, 3rd Earl of Bute and Pitt the elder. He held the County Durham seat for two parliaments until he declined to stand in the election of 1768.

On 18 April 1774 Shafto married Anne Duncombe (died 1783), daughter and heir of Thomas Duncombe of Duncombe Park, Yorkshire, by his marriage to Diana Howard, a daughter of Henry Howard, 4th Earl of Carlisle. Shafto and his wife had three children, John (1775–1802), Robert (1776–1848), and Thomas (born 1777). His wife, Anne, had inherited property in the rotten borough of Downton in Wiltshire and he became one of its two members in 1780. He is known to have supported William Pitt the Younger during the regency crisis of 1788–9 and did not seek re-election in 1790. Robert Shafto died on 24 November 1797 and is buried in the Shafto family crypt beneath the floor of Whitworth Church. He was succeeded in his estates by his elder son, John Shafto.

== The song ==
The song is said to relate the story of how he broke the heart of Bridget Belasyse of Brancepeth Castle, County Durham, where his brother Thomas was rector, when he married Anne Duncombe of Duncombe Park in Yorkshire. Bridget Belasyse is said to have died two weeks after hearing the news, although other sources claim that she died a fortnight before the wedding of pulmonary tuberculosis. Even if the song was not composed about him, his supporters almost certainly added a verse for the 1761 elections with the lyrics:

Bobby Shafto's looking out,
All his ribbons flew about,
All the ladies gave a shout,
Hey for Bobby Shafto!

Thomas and George Allan, in their Tyneside Songs and Readings (1891), argued that the "Bobby Shafto" of the song was in fact a relative, Robert Shafto (1760–1781) of Benwell. It is likely that his grandson, Robert Duncombe Shafto, also used the song for electioneering in 1861, with several of the later verses being added around this time.

Parliament of Great Britain
Preceded by George Bowes; Raby Vane	Member of Parliament for County Durham; 1760–1768; With: Raby Vane to 1761; Hon. Frederick Vane 1760–1768	Succeeded by Sir Thomas Clavering, Bt; Hon. Frederick Vane
Preceded by Bartholomew Bouverie; Sir Philip Hales, Bt	Member of Parliament for Downton; 1780–1790; With: Sir Philip Hales, Bt; Hon. Henry Seymour-Conway; Hon. William Seymour-Conway	Succeeded by Bartholomew Bouverie; William Scott
