= Ralph Gowland =

British soldier and politician

Ralph Gowland (c. 1722–c. 1782) was a British soldier and politician who sat in the House of Commons at times between 1761 and 1780.

Gowland was the son of Samuel Gowland, attorney, of Cook's Court, Lincoln's Inn and his wife Averil Skinner. He married Ann Darby, daughter of John Darby of Foots Cray, Kent on 25 July 1749 and lived at Little Eppleton County Durham. He was a major in the Durham Militia and served in the Seven Years' War (1756-1763) with Lord Darlington.

Darlington put Gowland forward as candidate for City of Durham at the 1761 general election but he was unsuccessful. He stood again at the same constituency at by-election in December 1761. He was returned as Member of Parliament, but unseated on petition. He could not compete with the Lambtons and Tempests in wealth or in popularity, and found it difficult to meet the cost of the elections and the petition. In 1775 Gowland was recommended by Captain George Johnstone, RN to Sir James Lowther as a candidate for Cockermouth in the most glowing terms. "If you have not communicated your intentions to Major Gowland I shall presume to bring an image to your mind that has disturbed me all night. Genius, generosity, fortitude, and affability are painted on his mien, loving and beloved by all men of worth and real virtue. Known and esteemed by the first characters for the extent of his knowledge, with an elocution capable of enforcing his opinions. Talbot raised Thompson, Hertford, David Hume, Rockingham, Burke. But you have a prize in your power superior to all three and your glory and advantage would be in proportion."

Gowland was returned as MP for Cockermouth at a by-election of January 1775. His career in the House did not live up to the eulogy. He supported the opposition when he voted. After February 1779 he was marked on division lists as absent or too ill to attend and there is no record of his having spoken in the House. The Public Ledger in 1779 only said about him that "he pins his political faith" on Sir James, and votes with him. He did not stand again in 1780, and died soon after.

Parliament of Great Britain
Preceded by John Tempest; Henry Lambton	Member of Parliament for City of Durham; 1761–1762; With: John Tempest	Succeeded by John Tempest; Major General John Lambton
Preceded by Captain George Johnstone, RN; Fletcher Norton	Member of Parliament for Cockermouth; 1775–1780; With: James Adair	Succeeded by John Baynes Garforth; John Lowther
