= Ralph Lambton =

English ancestor of the Earl of Durham

- Born: c. 1651; Chester-le-Street, Durham, England
- Died: 1717 (aged 65–66)
- Spouse: Dorothy Hedworth
- Children: 3, including John and Henry
- Relatives: William Lambton (brother)

Ralph Lambton Esq. (c. 25 July 1651 – 1717) was an ancestor of the Earl of Durham.

== Biography ==
Lambton was born around 1651 in Chester-le-Street, Durham, England to Henry Lambton (son of Colonel Sir William Lambton) and Mary Davison (daughter of Sir Alexander Davison of Blakiston). His birth date is placed around July 25th.

Lambton had a brother, William.

Lambton married to Dorothy Hedworth and was father to:

- Major General John Lambton (1710–1794)
- Henry Lambton MP for Durham (d. 1761)
- Major General Hedworth Lambton (d. 1758)
