= Thomas Lilburne =

English politician

Thomas Lilburne (died 25 March 1665) was an English politician who sat in the House of Commons in 1656 and 1659. He fought in the Parliamentary army in the English Civil War.

Lilburne was the son of George Lilburne of Sunderland and his first wife Jane Chambers. He was a parliamentary officer in 1644. He was of Offerton and was steward of the manor of Holm Cultram from 1652 until his death.

In 1656, Lilburne was elected Member of Parliament for County Durham in the Second Protectorate Parliament. He was elected MP for Newcastle in 1659 for the Third Protectorate Parliament. He was a major in the army of General Monck and was described as one of the persons instrumental in His Majesty's happy restoration. It is noted that Charles II made Lilburne a grant 'concerning Holme' as from Lady Day 1664.

Lilburne died in 1665 and was buried at the church of Houghton-le-Spring, where he is commemorated on a plain blue slab.

Lilburne married Margaret Scurfield, widow of George Scurfield. He was the cousin of Robert Lilburne, the parliamentary soldier, and John Lilburne, known as Free-Born John for his championing of democratic freedom.

Parliament of England
Preceded by George Lilburne; Robert Lilburne	Member of Parliament for County Durham; 1656; With: James Clavering	Succeeded by Constituency discontinued
Preceded by Walter Strickland	Member of Parliament for Newcastle; 1659; With: Mark Shaftoe	Succeeded by Robert Ellison
