= Sir John Eden, 2nd Baronet =

British Member of Parliament (1677–1728)

Sir John Eden Bt MP
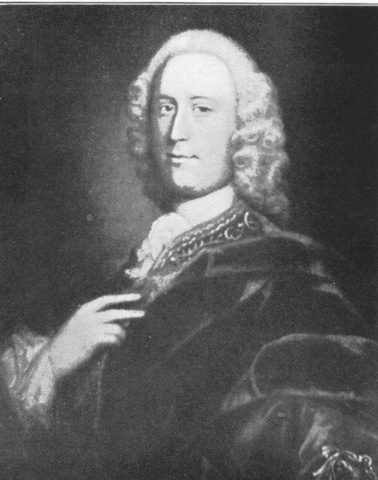
- Portrait of Eden

Member of Parliament for Durham County
- In office 1712–1727
- Preceded by: Sir Robert Eden, 1st Baronet
- Succeeded by: Sir George Bowes

Mayor of Hartlepool
- In office 1714–1715
- Preceded by: Anthony Smith
- Succeeded by: John Tempest

Personal details
- Born: 1677 West Auckland, County Durham, England
- Died: 2 May 1728 (aged 50–51) Bath, Somerset
- Resting place: St. Helen's Churchyard, Saint Helen Auckland
- Party: Whig
- Spouse: Catherine Shafto
- Relations: Anthony Eden (Great-Great-Great-Great-Grandson); Shafto family (in-laws and cousins)
- Children: Sir Robert Eden, 3rd Baronet
- Parent(s): Sir Robert Eden, 1st Baronet; Margaret Lambton
- Education: Queen's College, Oxford

Sir John Eden, 2nd Baronet MP (Bap. 11 September 1677 – 2 May 1728) was a British politician who sat in the House of Commons from 1713 to 1727.

== Early life ==
Eden was the eldest son of Sir Robert Eden, 1st Baronet, of West Auckland (c. 1644–1721) and his wife Margaret Lambton, daughter of John Lambton of Durham and was baptized on 11 September 1677. He matriculated at Queen's College, Oxford on 25 February 1695. He married Catherine Shafto, his 3rd Cousin once removed and daughter of Mark Shafto of Whitworth, County Durham, on 31 January 1715 and was given Windlestone Hall on the occasion.

== Political career ==
Eden was returned unopposed as Member of Parliament for County Durham in succession to his father at the 1713 general election. He was also Mayor of Hartlepool for the year 1714–15. He was returned unopposed again at the 1715 general election. He succeeded to the baronetcy on the death of his father on 30 March 1721. At the 1722 general election he won the seat at Durham in a contest, but only because of dissention between his opposing Whig candidates. He was mayor of Hartlepool again for the year 1722–1723. He did not stand for Durham in 1727 when his opponents had patched up their differences.

== Death and Descendants ==
Eden died at Bath on 2 May 1728 and was succeeded in the baronetcy by his only son Robert. He was buried at St Helen's Churchyard, Saint Helen Auckland on 17 May 1728

He is the 4 times great-grandfather of Anthony Eden, the Prime Minister of United Kingdom.

Parliament of Great Britain
Preceded by Sir Robert Eden, Bt; William Lambton	Member of Parliament for Durham (County); 1713–1727; With: John Hedworth	Succeeded by George Bowes; John Hedworth
Baronetage of England
Preceded by Sir Robert Eden, 1st Baronet, of West Auckland	Baronet (of West Auckland); 1721-1728	Succeeded by Sir Robert Eden, 3rd Baronet
