= George Bowes (MP for County Durham) =

English coal proprietor and Whig politician

Sir George Bowes
- Born: August 21, 1701
- Died: August 21, 1760 (aged 59)
- Occupations: English coal proprietor and Whig politician

Sir George Bowes (21 August 1701 – 17 September 1760) was an English coal proprietor and Whig politician who sat in the House of Commons for 33 years from 1727 to 1760.

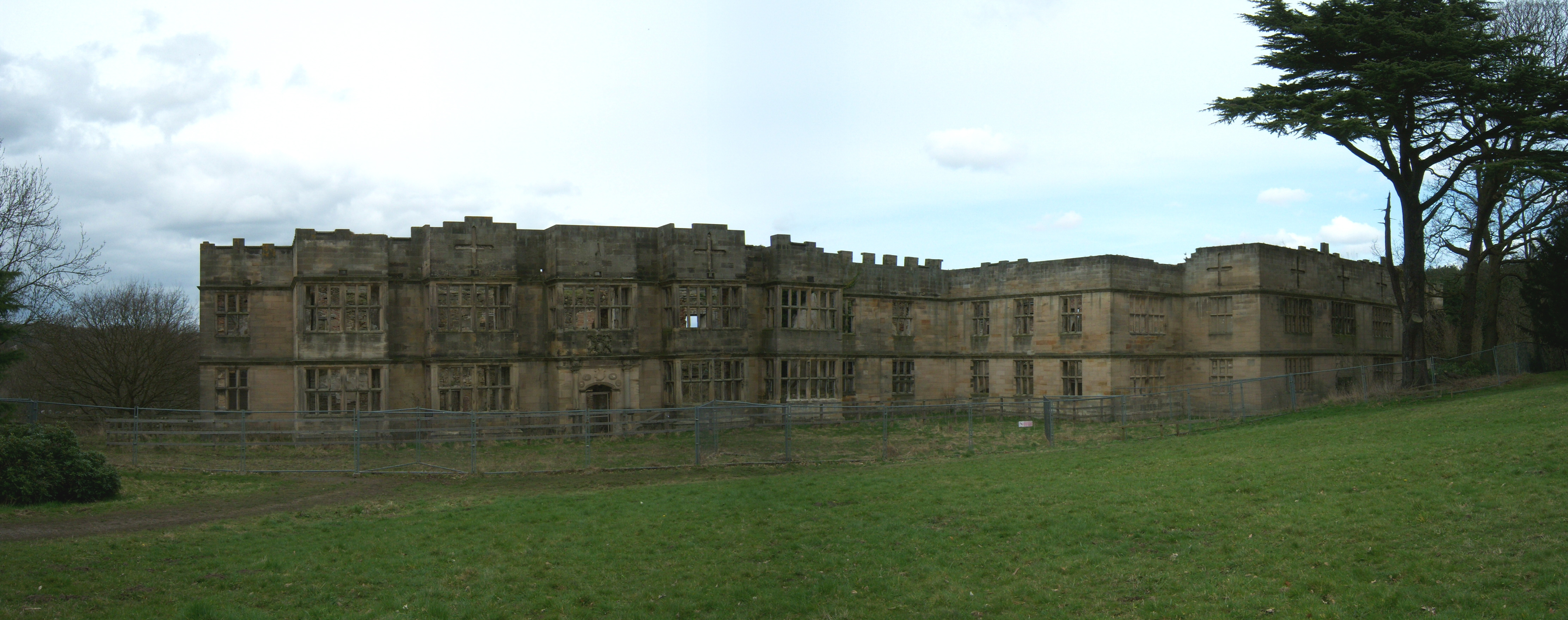
The shell of Gibside Hall in County Durham

== Early life ==
George Bowes was baptized on 4 September 1701, the youngest son of Sir William Bowes, MP, and Elizabeth Bowes (née Blakiston). The Bowes family had been prominent in County Durham, with their ownership of the estate and castle of Streatlam but in 1713, George's father acquired (from his wife's family) the Gibside estate which included some of the area's richest coal seams and led to the family becoming immensely wealthy through the coal trade. George Bowes inherited the family estates in 1721, including Gibside. Although he was the youngest son, his elder brothers had died young. In October 1724 he married the fourteen-year-old Eleanor Verney, but she died in December of that year. Her death was commemorated in a poem, written by Lady Mary Wortley Montagu. Horace Walpole, years later, implied that she had died as a result of Bowes' sexual vigour ("the violence of the bridegroom's embraces").

== Founder of a cartel for coal owners ==
Bowes was rich and influential, largely on account of the coal which lay beneath his estates. In 1726 he was a founder of the Grand Alliance of coal owners, a cartel for the control of the London coal trade. At the 1727 British general election, Bowes was returned unopposed as Whig Member of Parliament for County Durham. He voted against the Government on the civil list arrears in 1729, and made his first reported speech on 23 February 1731. He voted against the government again on the Excise Bill in 1733, and on the repeal of the Septennial Act in 1734. He was returned unopposed again at the 1734 British general election. He voted against the Spanish convention in 1739, and against the motion for Walpole's dismissal in February 1741. At the 1741 British general election he was returned again unopposed and continued to act against the Government until 1744. Then he spoke against opposition motions in January for an inquiry into the employment of Hanoverian troops in British pay and in February for adding a demand for an inquiry into the state of the navy when the loyal address to the King was to be made on the projected French invasion. He offered to raise a troop of horse at his own expense. In March 1745 he opposed a vote of credit but took an active part in raising forces against the rebels. He did not vote on the Hanoverians in 1746. He was returned unopposed again at the 1747 British general election and was classed in the Parliament as Opposition.

== Support for Tory positions ==
Bowes was returned unopposed for Durham again at the 1754 British general election and was still considered an opposition Whig. He spoke on the Tory side during the debates on the Oxfordshire election petitions.

== Second marriage and daughter ==
Bowes married as his second wife Mary Gilbert on 14 June 1743/44 at St Botolph's, Aldersgate, City of London. They had one daughter, Mary Eleanor Bowes, born 24 February 1748 (old style)/1749 (new style). She married John Lyon, 9th Earl of Strathmore and Kinghorne, who later took the name "Bowes", as a condition of the will of George Bowes, in order to inherit the Bowes estate.

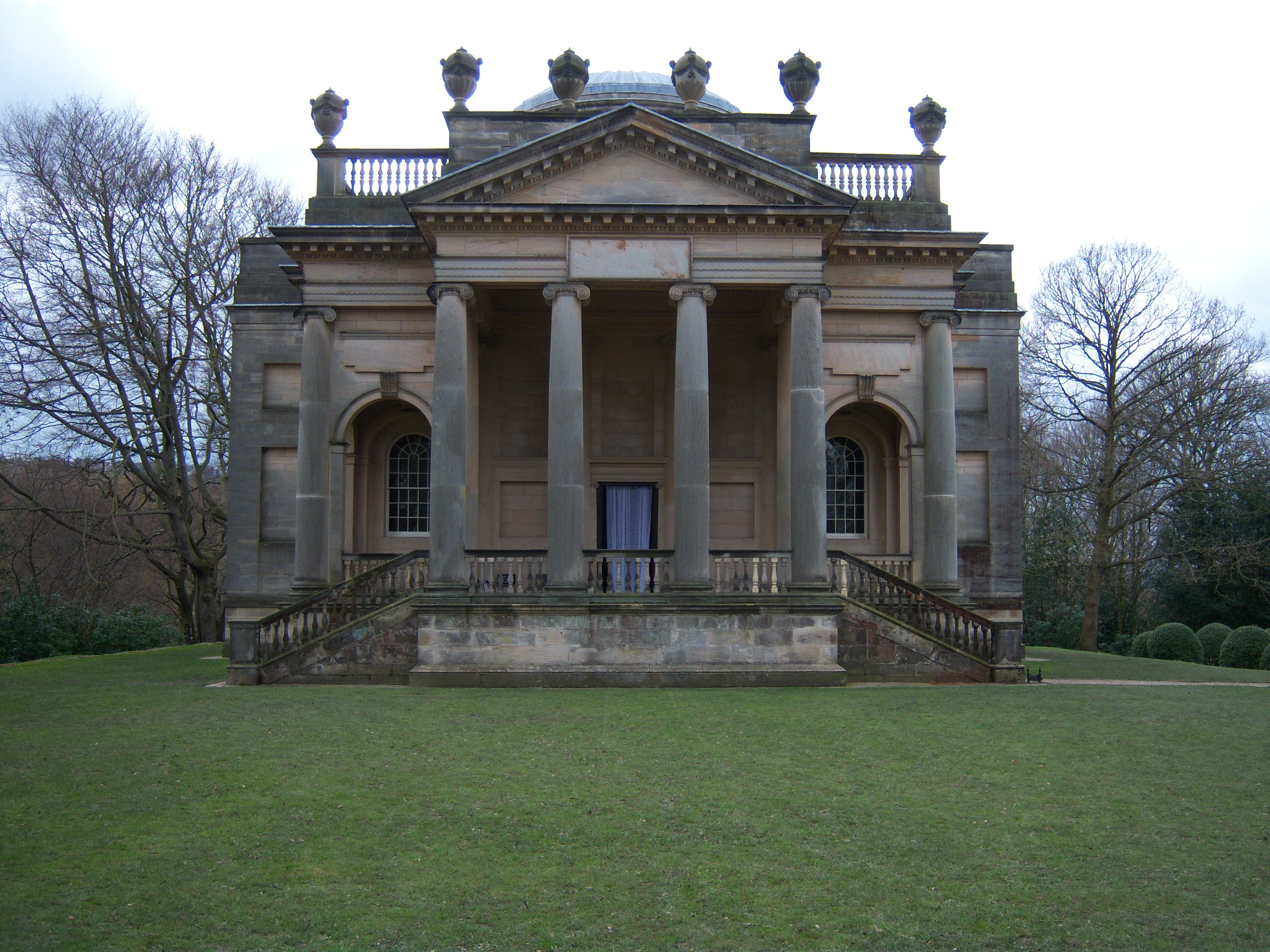
Gibside Chapel

== Mansion ==
His principal residences were Gibside, a mansion on the banks of the River Derwent in County Durham, and Streatlam Castle, an estate close to the town of Barnard Castle, also in County Durham. The park surrounding Gibside includes a column, 140 feet high, dedicated to British liberty. On George Bowes' death in 1760, Gibside passed to his son-in-law, John Bowes, the 9th Earl of Strathmore. Lord Strathmore built a mausoleum chapel in the grounds, in Palladian style, in which Bowes was finally interred on its completion in 1812.

== Descendant ==
Bowes is the 7th great-grandfather of Charles III.

== Other Sources ==
=== Primary source materials ===
- Bowes family of Strathmore and Gibside. Durham County Record Office Catalogue reference D/St contains family and estate papers.

Parliament of Great Britain
Preceded by Sir John Eden, Bt; John Hedworth	Member of Parliament for County Durham; 1727–1760; With: John Hedworth to 1747; Hon. Henry Vane (1) 1747–1753; Hon. Henry Vane (2) 1753–1758; Hon. Raby Vane from 1758	Succeeded by Bobby Shafto; Hon. Raby Vane
