= George Lilburne =

George Lilburne (c.1585 – 23 August 1666) was an English merchant and politician who sat in the House of Commons in 1654. He supported the Parliamentary cause in the English Civil War.

Lilburne was the son of John Lilburne of Thickley Punchardon, and his wife Isabel Wortley, and was baptised at Auckland St Andrew on 16 January 1586. He settled at Sunderland and was probably a merchant adventurer and involved in the coal trade. Like others of his family he became heavily involved in politics. On the outbreak of the Civil War, he was Mayor of Sunderland and was the only opponent of the other magistrates of Durham and Northumberland who met and formed themselves into Commissioners of Array for the King to raise transport and supplies. As a result, Lilburne was imprisoned and kept at Durham and then York. Although it was against his conscience, Lilburne signed a warrant 12 September 1642 with William Carnaby, Thomas Ridell Jnr and Thomas Lydell to requisition horses to carry ammunition for the Kings forces under the Marquis of Newcastle. Sunderland remained Royalist until captured for Parliament by the Scottish army in 1644. Parliament then wanted to restore the coal trade and bargained with the Royalists for the release of George Lilburne in exchange for a prominent Royalist prisoner. He found the mines in very poor condition. He was then the only magistrate in Sunderland and sat on all the committees of sequestration. He managed to get hold of the Harraton colliery belonging to the lessees of Sir John Hedworth. However it was not back into production until 1647.

In 1654, Lilburne was elected Member of Parliament for County Durham in the First Protectorate Parliament. This was the first time that the County of Durham was represented in parliament.

Lilburne was one of the governors of Kepyer School. After the restoration he built a north wing of the hospital and endowed it.

Lilburne died in 1666 (although some sources give his death as occurring in 1677).

Lilburne married firstly Jane Chambers and had a son Thomas who was a parliamentary soldier and MP. He married secondly Eleanor Hicks and had further children. Through his son William, he was the ancestor of US President Thomas Jefferson. Lilburne was the uncle of Robert Lilburne, the parliamentary soldier, and John Lilburne, known as Free-Born for outspoken support of democratic freedoms.

Parliament of England
Preceded by Newly created for the Protectorate	Member of Parliament for County Durham; 1654; With: Robert Lilburne	Succeeded by Thomas Lilburne; James Clavering
