= William Henry Lambton =

British politician

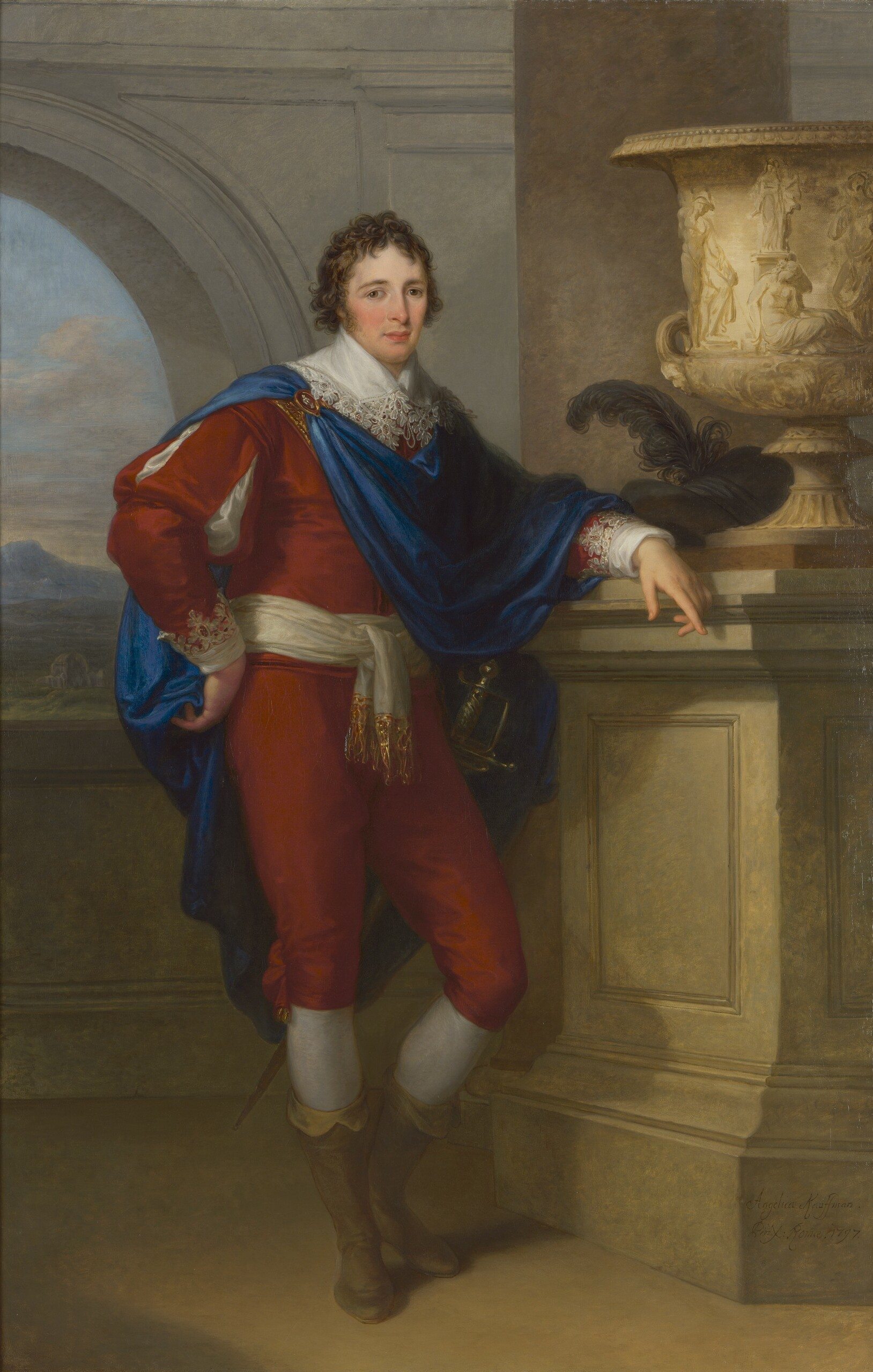
- William H. Lambton, by Angelica Kauffmann

Member of Parliament for Durham
- In office 1787–1797 Serving with John Tempest (1787–1794); Sir Henry Vane-Tempest (1794–1797)

Personal details
- Born: 1764
- Died: 1797 (aged 32–33) Tuscany, Italy
- Spouse: Anne Villiers (m. 1791)
- Children: 1+, including John
- Parent: John Lambton (father)
- Relatives: Henry Lambton (uncle); Ralph Lambton (grandfather)
- Education: Trinity College, Cambridge

William Henry Lambton (1764–1797) was a British member of Parliament (MP) who represented the City of Durham in the House of Commons.

== Biography ==
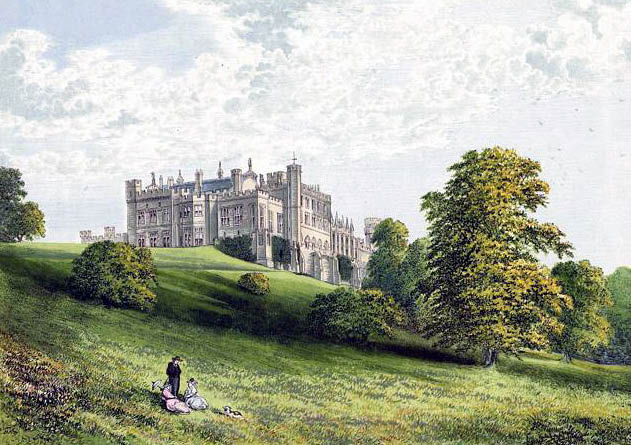
Lambton Castle in the late 19th century

He was the son of Major-General John Lambton, who preceded him as the MP for Durham, and the brother of Ralph John Lambton, who was also an MP for Durham. Lambton was educated at Wandsworth (1773–78), Eton College (1778-82) and Trinity College, Cambridge in 1782.

Lambton was a Freemason, and in 1788 was installed as the first Provincial Grand Master of Durham. The Durham cathedral organist, Thomas Ebdon, composed a march for the occasion.

He inherited the estates of his father in 1794 and engaged the Italian architect Joseph Bonomi the Elder (1739-1808) to build a new house in neo-classical style on the site of Harraton Hall, north of the River Wear. The new house would be called Lambton Hall and the original Lambton Hall on the south side of the river demolished. However, illness would prevent him from seeing the scheme finished.

In 1791, Lambton had married Anne Barbara Frances Villiers, the daughter of George Villiers, 4th Earl of Jersey. Their eldest son, John Lambton inherited aged 5 and was later made Earl of Durham . He would finalise the building of Lambton Hall, now expanded in scope and renamed Lambton Castle.

He died of consumption on 30 November 1797, and was buried in the Old English cemetery in Livorno, Italy.

Parliament of Great Britain
Preceded by Major General John Lambton; John Tempest	Member of Parliament for Durham; 1787–1797; With: John Tempest 1787–1794; Sir Henry Vane-Tempest 1794–1797	Succeeded by Ralph John Lambton; Sir Henry Vane-Tempest
