= Henry Lambton =

British landowner, colliery owner and politician (1697–1761)

Member of Parliament for City of Durham
- In office 1734–1761 Serving with Charles Talbot; Ralph Gowland

Mayor of Hartlepool
- In office 1729–1730; 1741–1742; 1753–1754

Personal details
- Born: 1697
- Died: 1761 (aged 63–64)
- Party: Whig
- Relations: John Lambton (brother); William Lambton (uncle); William H. Lambton (nephew)
- Parent: Ralph Lambton (father)
- Education: Queen’s College, Oxford

Henry Lambton (1697 – 26 June 1761) was a British landowner, colliery owner and Whig politician who sat in the House of Commons from 1734 to 1761.

== Biography ==
Lambton was born in 1697, and baptised on 9 November, the eldest son of Ralph Lambton of Barnes, county Durham and his wife Dorothy Hedworth, daughter of John Hedworth of Harraton, county Durham. He matriculated at Queen’s College, Oxford on 16 July 1715, aged 17. In 1717, he succeeded his father. He was admitted at Lincoln's Inn on 17 January 1719. He was sometime attorney to the Bishop of Durham. In 1724, he succeeded his uncle William Lambton, MP, at Lambton to an estate which had been held by his family for over 400 years. He thereby inherited extensive colliery interests, and became active in the coal lobby as the head of the Sunderland coal owners. He became Mayor of Hartlepool in 1729.

After a narrow defeat at a by-election for City of Durham in 1730, Lambton was returned there unopposed as a Whig Member of Parliament at another by-election on 25 January 1734. He was returned again soon after at the 1734 British general election. In 1741, he was Mayor of Hartlepool again and was returned at the 1741 British general election. He voted with the Administration under Walpole in all recorded divisions, but was absent on the Hanoverians in 1742, 1744 and 1746, He was classed as Old Whig in 1746. He was returned again at the 1747 British general election In 1753, he was again Mayor of Hartlepool.

Lambton was returned unopposed as a Whig at the 1754 British general election. He faced a strong challenge at the 1761 British general election and was returned by a narrow majority of 20 votes.

Lambton died unmarried on 26 June 1761. He was succeeded by his brother William Lambton, who died unmarried in 1774 when the estate passed to a third brother Gen. John Lambton MP.

Parliament of Great Britain
Preceded by John Shafto; Charles Talbot	Member of Parliament for City of Durham; 1734–1761; With: Charles Talbot; Ralph Gowland	Succeeded by John Tempest; Ralph Gowland
