= Raby Vane =

Raby Vane (2 January 1736 – 23 October 1769) was a Royal Navy officer and Member of Parliament, a younger son of Henry Vane, 1st Earl of Darlington.

Vane was born on 2 January 1736, the third son of Henry Vane, 1st Earl of Darlington and his wife Lady Grace Fitzroy. He was commissioned a lieutenant in the Royal Navy on 18 July 1757. Vane's family had a strong electoral interest in County Durham, and when his eldest brother Viscount Barnard succeeded to the peerage on their father's death in 1758, Raby succeeded to Barnard's seat there without a contest. He was promoted commander on 14 January 1759 and appointed to command the fireship Proserpine. Vane was made post-captain and given command of the frigate Arethusa, captured from the French that summer and purchased into the Royal Navy, on 4 September 1759. In addition, he was chosen Mayor of Hartlepool this year. He commanded the Arethusa, capturing several privateers, until she was placed in ordinary service after the Treaty of Paris in February 1763.

At the 1761 British general election, Vane accepted the offer of a seat at Carlisle from Sir James Lowther, whose sister had married Vane's eldest brother, now Earl of Darlington. He favored the peace preliminaries in December 1762. Vane continued to be employed as a naval officer after the peace. He was appointed captain of the fourth-rate Achilles, guard ship at Portsmouth, on 12 May 1763. He turned Achilles over to his fellow MP, Lord William Campbell, on taking command of the third-rate Ramillies, guard ship at Chatham, on 19 March 1764. He turned over command to William Saltern Willett on 19 November; it was to be his last command afloat.

Vane supported the Rockingham ministry in 1765, but had swung around to favor Lord Bute, Lowther's brother-in-law, by 1766. Newcastle, in opposition in 1767, considered him a supporter of the Chatham ministry. He did not stand at the 1768 British general election and refused an offer to sit at Richmond by Sir Lawrence Dundas in May 1769.

On 18 April 1768, Vane married Elizabeth Sayer, the daughter of George Sayer, Archdeacon of Durham. However, he died on 23 October 1769 without leaving children.

Parliament of Great Britain
Preceded by George Bowes; Viscount Barnard	Member of Parliament for County Durham; 1758–1761; With: George Bowes 1758–1760; Robert Shafto 1760–1761	Succeeded by Robert Shafto; Frederick Vane
Preceded by Charles Howard; John Stanwix	Member of Parliament for Carlisle; 1761–1768; With: Henry Curwen	Succeeded by Lord Edward Bentinck; George Musgrave
