= John Lambton, 1st Earl of Durham =

British politician (1792–1840)

The Right Honourable The Earl of Durham GCB, PC
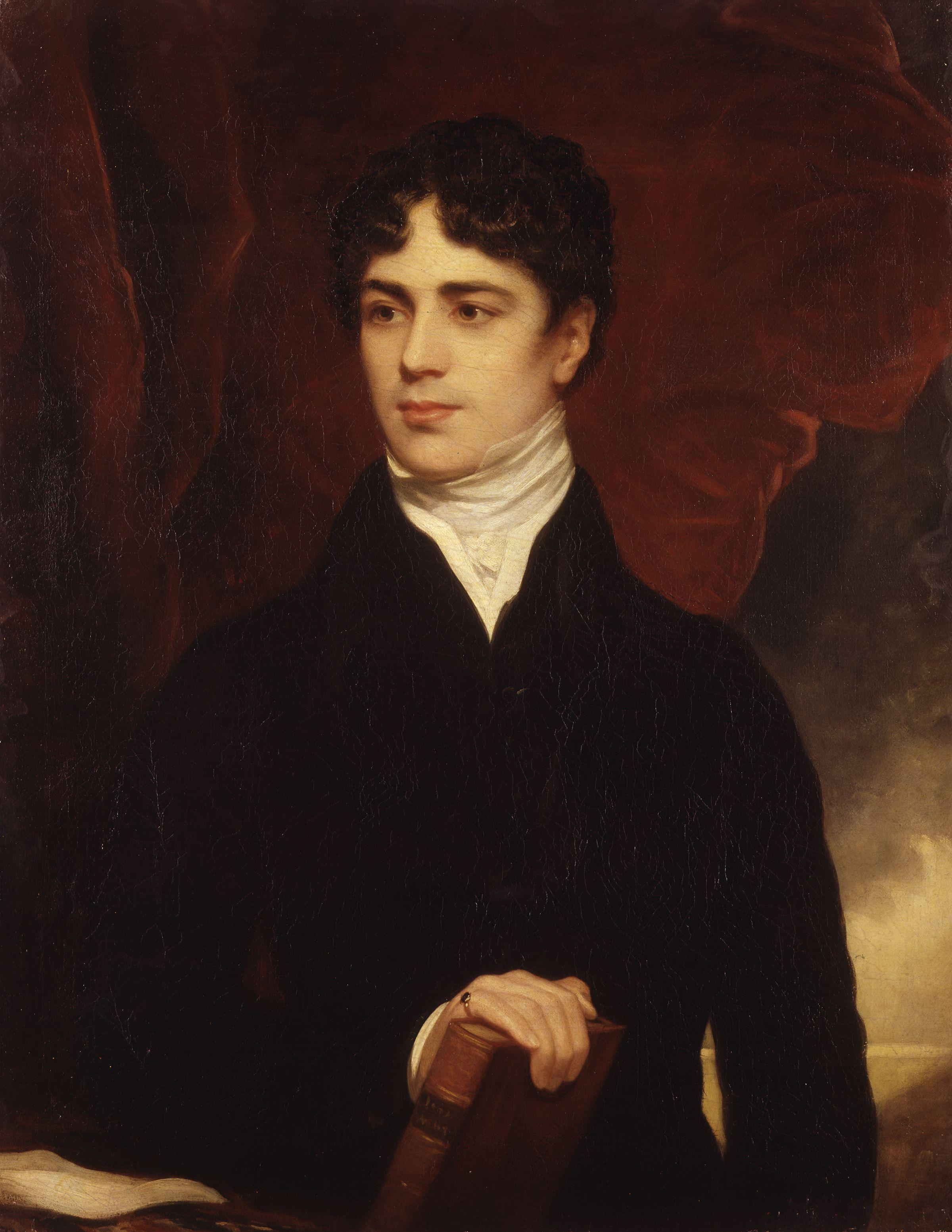
- Portrait of the Earl of Durham by Thomas Phillips, 1820

Lord Privy Seal
- In office 22 November 1830 – March 1833
- Monarch: William IV
- Prime Minister: The Earl Grey
- Preceded by: The Earl of Rosslyn
- Succeeded by: The Earl of Ripon

Lieutenant-Governor of Lower Canada
- In office 1838–1839
- Monarch: Victoria
- Prime Minister: The Lord Melbourne
- Preceded by: The Earl of Gosford
- Succeeded by: The Lord Sydenham

Governor General and High Commissioner, British North America
- In office 1838–1839
- Monarch: Victoria
- Prime Minister: The Lord Melbourne
- Preceded by: Sir John Colborne
- Succeeded by: The Lord Sydenham

Personal details
- Born: 12 April 1792 St George Hanover Square, Middlesex, England
- Died: 28 July 1840 (aged 48) Cowes, England
- Party: Whig
- Spouses: Harriet Cholmondeley (m. 1812; died 1815) Lady Louisa Grey (m. 1816)
- Children: 8
- Parents: William Henry Lambton; Lady Anne Barbara Frances Villiers
- Military career
- Branch: British Army
- Service years: 1809–1811
- Rank: Cornet
- Unit: 10th Hussars

John George Lambton, 1st Earl of Durham (12 April 1792 – 28 July 1840), also known as "Radical Jack" and commonly referred to in Canadian history texts as Lord Durham, was a British Whig statesman, colonial administrator, Governor General and high commissioner of British North America.

A leading reformer, Lord Durham played a major role in the passage of the Reform Bill of 1832. He later served as ambassador to Russia. He was a founding member and chairman of the New Zealand Company that played a key role in the colonisation of New Zealand.

George Woodcock wrote Lord Durham was "proud, wayward, immensely rich, with romantic good looks and an explosive temper", one of those "natural rebels who turn their rebellious energies to constructive purposes. Both at home and abroad he became a powerful exponent of the early nineteenth-century liberal spirit."

== Background and education ==
Lambton was born on 12 April 1792 in the house of his father, William Henry Lambton, at 14 Berkeley Square in St George Hanover Square (now within the City of Westminster). His mother was Lady Anne Barbara Frances, daughter of George Bussy Villiers, 4th Earl of Jersey. He was christened with the names of his grandfathers, John Lambton and George Villiers. At the time of his birth, his father was taking part in the formation and chairing of the Society of the Friends of the People.

After attending Eton College, Lambton joined the army in 1809 as a cornet in the 10th Hussars, but resigned in 1811. Following his father's death in 1797, he inherited an immense fortune, derived largely from mining on lands surrounding Lambton Castle, the ancestral family home in County Durham, which formed the basis of Lambton Collieries. Other properties in County Durham included Dinsdale Park and Low Dinsdale Manor..

In 1821, Lambton earned the epithet "Jog Along Jack" after he was asked what he considered an adequate income for an English gentleman and replying that "a man might jog along comfortably enough on £40,000 a year" (equivalent to an annual income of £10 million in 2026).

Lambton supported educational projects such as the Mechanics' Institutes and the newly founded University of London.

== New Zealand ==
In 1825 Lambton took the chairmanship of the New Zealand Company, a venture that made the first attempt to colonise New Zealand, with his interest being philanthropic. The venture failed at colonisation.

== Political career ==
Lambton was first elected to Parliament for County Durham in the general election of 1812, a seat he held until 1828, when he was raised to the peerage as Baron Durham, of the City of Durham and of Lambton Castle in the County Palatine of Durham. In Parliament he supported liberal causes, from the defence of Queen Caroline to the removal of political disabilities on Dissenters and Roman Catholics. When his father-in-law Lord Grey became prime minister in 1830, he was sworn into the Privy Council and appointed Lord Privy Seal. Along with Lord Russell he was a leading promoter of reform. He helped draft the famous Reform Bill of 1832. It reformed the electoral system by abolishing tiny districts, gave representation to cities, gave the vote to small landowners, tenant farmers, and shopkeepers and to householders who paid a yearly rental of £10 or more and some lodgers.

Lord Durham resigned from the cabinet in 1833. Later that year he was further honoured, made Viscount Lambton and Earl of Durham. Between 1835 and 1837, he served as Ambassador to Russia. While in Russia, he was invested as a Knight of the Order of St. Alexander Nevsky, of the Order of St. Andrew and of the Order of St. Anna. In 1837, he was appointed a Knight Grand Cross of the Order of the Bath.

== Canada ==
In 1838, Lord Durham was named Governor General and High Commissioner for British North America (several North American colonies administered collectively by the Colonial Office, including: the provinces of Lower Canada and Upper Canada, Nova Scotia, New Brunswick, and their several Dependencies, Newfoundland, Prince Edward Island, Cape Breton and Bermuda). A main task set for him was to investigate the political situation there after the Rebellions of 1837 in Upper Canada (Ontario) and Lower Canada (Quebec) and recommendations as to necessary reforms.

Lord Durham and his longtime colleague Edward Gibbon Wakefield arrived in Lower Canada on 29 May 1838. One of his tasks as governor general was to investigate the circumstances surrounding the Lower Canada Rebellion of Louis-Joseph Papineau and the Upper Canada Rebellion of William Lyon Mackenzie, which had occurred in 1837. His decisions with regard to the Rebellion prisoners encountered stiff opposition at Westminster. He lost the support of the Prime Minister, Melbourne, whereupon he published his repudiation and resignation 9 October 1838 and set sail for London on 1 November.

Lord Durham's detailed Report on the Affairs of British North America (London, January 1839) recommended a modified form of responsible government and a legislative union of Upper Canada, Lower Canada and the Maritime Provinces in order to assimilate the French Canadians, whom he considered inferior. Indeed, he stated in his report that French Canadians were "a people with no literature and no history" and therefore advocated for their full assimilation.

Lord Durham is lauded by some Canadian historians for his recommendation to introduce responsible government, which the British government did not accept. It took ten more years before a responsible parliament was established in the colonies. Colonial legislatures had existed in the two Canadas since 1791 but were toothless compared to appointed colonial administrators. Lord Durham is less well regarded for recommending the union of Upper and Lower Canada, which resulted in the creation of the united Province of Canada.

As early as 1844, Lord Durham's intended policy of assimilation faced setbacks, as Louis-Hippolyte Lafontaine's party in the House forced de facto reestablishment of French as a language of Parliament. Once responsible government was achieved (1848), French Canadians in Canada East succeeded by voting as a bloc in ensuring that they were powerfully represented in any cabinet, especially as the politics of Canada West was highly factional. The resulting deadlock between Canada East and West led to a movement for federal rather than unitary government, which resulted in the creation of confederation, a federal state known as the Dominion of Canada, incorporating New Brunswick and Nova Scotia, and dividing the United Canadas into two provinces, Ontario (Canada West) and Quebec (Canada East), in 1867.

== Industrialist ==
Lord Durham was a major coal owner in north east England and key participator in the Limitation of the Vend, a price fixing combination of mine owners. His rivalry with Charles Vane, 3rd Marquess of Londonderry, was to be a cause of the cartel's eventual collapse.

== Family ==
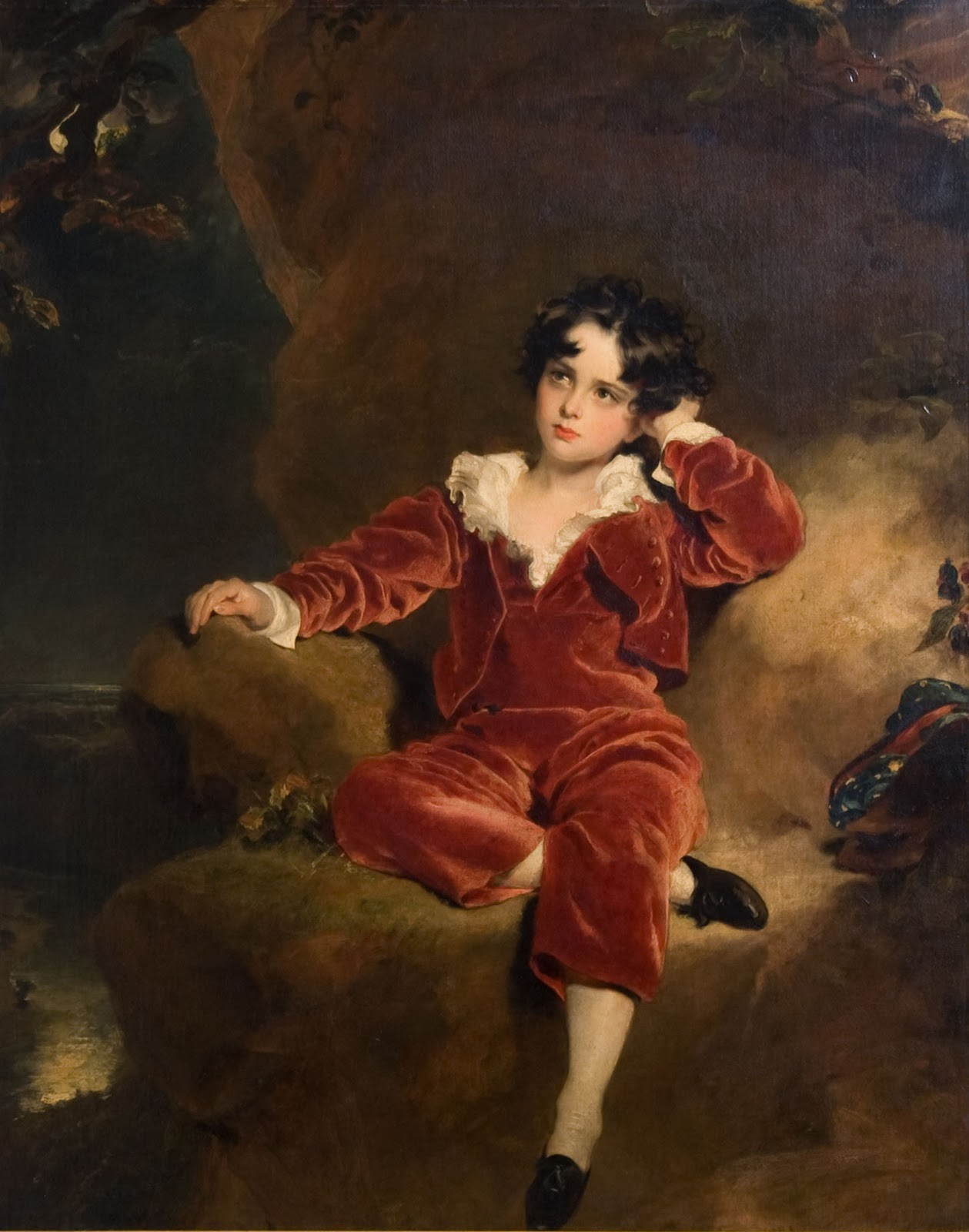
Master Lambton: Lambton's eldest son (until his death, aged 13) Charles William, painted by Thomas Lawrence and later known as The Red Boy.

Lord Durham was twice married. He fell in love with Harriet Cholmondeley, the illegitimate daughter of the 4th Earl of Cholmondeley, but when he announced they wanted to marry, he faced obstacles - aged under 21 and refused the required permission by his guardians to marry her. They then married just inside Scotland at Gretna Green on 1 January 1812, then with that accomplished they were allowed to marry in an Anglican ceremony at her father's estate of Malpas, Cheshire, on 28 January that year.

They had three daughters, who all predeceased him:

- Lady Frances Charlotte (16 October 1812 – 18 December 1835), married the Hon. John Ponsonby (later 5th Earl of Bessborough), but died a few months later of consumption.
- The Hon. Georgiana Sarah Elizabeth (2 March 1814 – 3 January 1833)
- The Hon. Harriet Caroline (30 May 1815 – 12 June 1832)

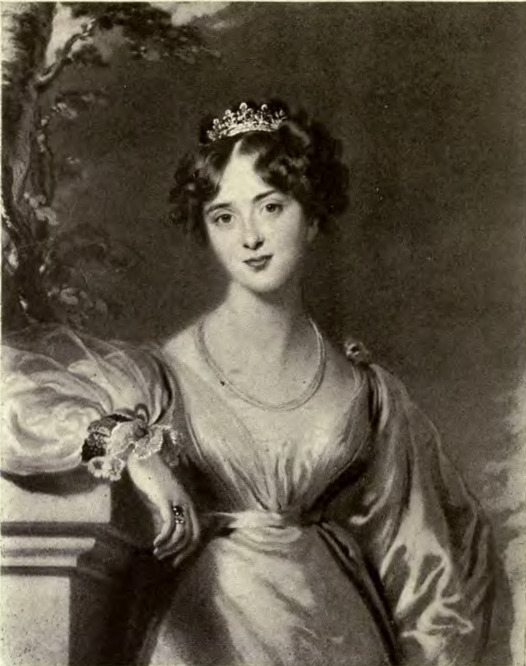
Lady Louisa Grey, portrait by Thomas Lawrence

After Harriet's death in July 1815, he married secondly Lady Louisa Grey, daughter of Charles Grey, 2nd Earl Grey, on 9 December 1816 at Lord Grey's estate, Howick, Northumberland. She was an amateur artist. They had two sons and three daughters:

- The Hon. Charles William (16 January 1818 – 24 September 1831) – see The Red Boy
- Lady Mary Louisa (8 May 1819 – 9 March 1898), married James Bruce, 8th Earl of Elgin
- Lady Emily Augusta (17 May 1823 – 2 November 1886), married Henry Cavendish, son of the Hon. Henry Cavendish
- The Hon. George Frederick D'Arcy (5 September 1828 – 27 November 1879), later 2nd Earl of Durham
- Lady Alice Anne Caroline (16 April 1831 – 15 January 1907), married Sholto Douglas, Lord Aberdour (later 18th Earl of Morton)

Lord Durham died at Cowes on the Isle of Wight in July 1840, aged 48, and was buried at St Mary and St Cuthbert, Chester-le-Street. He was succeeded by his eldest and only surviving son, George. The Countess of Durham only survived her husband by a year and died aged 44 on 26 November 1841 at Genoa from a serious cold.

== In literature ==
In one of her occasional political forays, Letitia Elizabeth Landon in her poetical illustration to Sir Thomas Lawrence's portrait, 'The Right Honourable Lord Durham. Now on an Embassy at the Court of Russia' in Fisher's Drawing Room Scrap Book, 1833', expresses her hopes that Lord Durham be able to persuade the Russians to return to Poland its lost freedom and sovereignty.

== Legacy ==
Names given in honour of the Earl include Lambton County, Ontario, Lambton, Toronto (including Lambton Mills, Lambton Mills Cemetery and Lambton House), Lambton Avenue in Toronto, Lord Durham Public School (Ajax, Ontario, closed), Lambton, Québec, Lambton Quay, Lambton Ward and Lambton Harbour in Wellington in New Zealand, and Durham Heights and Cape Lambton (both in the southern tip of Banks Island in the Northwest Territories). The Penshaw Monument in County Durham, on a hill west of Sunderland, was built in his honour.

== Coat of arms ==
Coat of arms of John Lambton, 1st Earl of Durham
Crest 1st: A ram's head cabossed Argent, attired Sable (Lambton); 2nd: A woman's head affrontée, couped at the breast, proper, hair flowing Or, wreathed about the temples with a garland of cinquefoils Gules, pierced Or (Hedworth); 3rd: Out of a ducal coronet Or, an antelope's head, isuant, winged Argent, attired and barbed Or (D'Arcy) Escutcheon Quarterly: 1st, Sable, a fess between three lambs passant Argent (Lambton); 2nd, Argent a fess Gules between three popinjays Vert, collard Gules (Lumley); 3rd, Argent, an escutcheon Sable, within an orle of eight cinquefoils Gules (Hedworth); 4th, Argent, three cinquefoils Gules (D'Arcy) Supporters On both sides a lion, the dexter Gules, the sinister Azure, both ducally gorged Or, and supporting a flagstaff Or, therefrom a banner Azure, the dexter charged with a cross potence and the sinister a lion passant guardant Or Motto First: LE JOUR VIENDRALE JOUR VIENDRA (French for 'The day will come') Orders Order of the Bath: TRIA JUNCTA IN UNO (Latin for 'Three Joined in One')

== Works cited ==
- Reid, Stuart J. (1906). Life and Letters of (John George Lambton) the First Earl of Durham 1792–1840. Longmans, Green & Company.

== Bibliography ==
=== In English ===
- Ajzenstat, Janet (1988). The Political Thought of Lord Durham. Montreal: McGill-Queen's University. p. 137. ISBN 0773506373.
- Bradshaw, Frederick (1903). Self-Government in Canada, and How it was Achieved: The Story of Lord Durham's Report. London: P.S.King. pp. 414 p.
- Martin, Ged (1972). The Durham Report and British Policy. Cambridge University Press. pp. 120 pages. ISBN 0521085306.
- New, Chester. "Lord Durham and the British Background of His Report" Canadian Historical Review 20.2 (1939): 119–135. online
- New, Chester. Lord Durham's Mission to Canada: A Biography of John George Lambton, First Earl of Durham Clarendon Press, 1929) online.
- Ouellet, Fernand (2000). "Lambton, John George, first Earl of Durham". Dictionary of Canadian Biography Online. University of Toronto, Université Laval.
- Reid, Stuart J. Life and Letters of the First Earl of Durham: 1792–1840 (2 vol London: Longmans, Green and Company. 1906). vol 1 online; also vol 2 online
- Wallace, W. Stewart (1948). "John George Lambton, first Earl of Durham (1792–1840)". The Encyclopedia of Canada. II. Toronto: University Associates of Canada: 411.
- Woodcock, George. "'Radical Jack': John George Lambton, First Earl of Durham" History Today 9.1 (1959): 3–12.

==== Primary sources ====
- Lambton, John George; Buller, Charles; Wakefield, Edward Gibbon (1839). The Report and Despatches of the Earl of Durham, Her Majesty's High Commissioner and Governor-General of British North America. London: Ridgways, Piccadilly.
- Mill, John Stuart (January 1838). "Radical Party and Canada: Lord Durham and the Canadians". London and Westminster Review. s. VI & XXVIII.
- Lambton, John George (1835). Speeches of the Earl of Durham on Reform of Parliament. Piccadilly: James Ridgway and Sons. pp. 204 p. ISBN 9781442638655. * Lady Durham's journal. Quebec Telegraph Print. Co. 1915.
- Shelley, Frances; Edgcumbe, Richard (1912). The Diary of Frances Lady Shelley. New York: C. Scribner's. pp. 406.
- Reid, John (1835). Sketch of the Political Career of the Earl of Durham. Glasgow: John Reid & Co. pp. 400 p.

=== In French ===
- Viau, Roger (1963). Lord Durham (in French). Montréal: Éditions HMH limitée. pp. 181 p.
- Desrosiers, Léo-Paul (1937). L'Accalmie : Lord Durham au Canada (in French). Montréal: Le Devoir. pp. 148 p.
- Fernand Ouellet « Lambton, John George, 1er comte de Durham [archive] », dans le Dictionnaire biographique du Canada en ligne, University of Toronto et Université Laval, 2000
- Ajzenstat, Janet (1988). La pensée politique de lord Durham (in French). Montréal: Université McGill-Queen. pp. 137 p. ISBN 0773506373.
- Martin, Ged (1972). Le rapport Durham et de la politique britannique (in French). Cambridge University Press. pp. 120 p. ISBN 0521085306.

Parliament of the United Kingdom
Preceded by Sir Henry Vane-Tempest, Bt; Viscount Barnard	Member of Parliament for County Durham; 1812–1828; With: Viscount Barnard 1812–1815; Hon. William Powlett 1815–1828	Succeeded by Hon. William Powlett; William Russell
Political offices
Preceded by The Earl of Rosslyn	Lord Privy Seal; 1830–1833	Succeeded by The Earl of Ripon
Civic offices
Preceded by The Earl Fitzwilliam	High Steward of Hull; 1833–1840	Succeeded by The Marquess of Normanby
Diplomatic posts
Preceded by Hon. John Duncan Bligh (ad interim)	British Ambassador to Russia; 1833–1837	Succeeded by John Ralph Milbanke (ad interim)
Government offices
Preceded by The Earl of Gosford	Lieutenant-Governor of Lower Canada; 1838–1839	Succeeded by The Lord Sydenham
Preceded by Sir John Colborne	Governor General of the Province of Canada; 1838–1839	Succeeded by The Lord Sydenham
Peerage of the United Kingdom
New creation	Earl of Durham; 1833–1840	Succeeded by George Lambton
New creation	Baron Durham; 1828–1840	Succeeded by George Lambton
