= William Lambton (1640–1724) =

British politician

Member of Parliament for County Durham
- In office 1710–1713 Serving with Sir Robert Eden, Bt

Member of Parliament for County Durham
- In office 1701–1702 Serving with Lionel Vane

Member of Parliament for County Durham
- In office 1685–1698 Serving with Robert Byerley (1685–1690); Sir Robert Eden, Bt (1690–1695); Sir William Bowes (1695–1698)

Personal details
- Born: 1640
- Died: 1724 (aged 83–84)
- Relatives: Ralph Lambton (brother); Henry Lambton (nephew)
- Education: Queen's College, Oxford

William Lambton (1640–1724) of New Lambton in County Durham was an English politician who sat in the English and British House of Commons between 1685 and 1713.

== Biography ==
Lambton was the eldest son of Henry Lambton and his wife Mary Davison, daughter of Sir Alexander Davison of Blakiston. He matriculated at Queen's College, Oxford in 1659. In 1693, he succeeded to his father's estate.

Lambton was returned unopposed as a member of parliament for County Durham at the English general elections of 1685, 1689, 1690 and 1695. He was defeated in 1698, but was returned unopposed again in the two general elections of 1701. He did not stand in 1702 and was next returned as MP for Durham County at the 1710 British general election. He did not stand again.

Lambton died unmarried in 1724, and his estates passed to his nephew Henry Lambton (son of Ralph Lambton), who served for a long time as member for the City of Durham.

Parliament of England
Preceded by William Bowes; Thomas Fetherstonhalgh	Member of Parliament for County Durham; 1685–1698; With: Robert Byerley 1685–1690; Sir Robert Eden, Bt 1690–1695; Sir William Bowes 1695–1698	Succeeded by Sir Robert Eden, Bt; Lionel Vane
Preceded by Lionel Vane; Sir Robert Eden, Bt	Member of Parliament for County Durham; 1701–1702; With: Lionel Vane	Succeeded by Sir William Bowes; Sir Robert Eden, Bt
Parliament of Great Britain
Preceded by Sir Robert Eden, Bt; William Vane	Member of Parliament for County Durham; 1710–1713; With: Sir Robert Eden, Bt	Succeeded by Sir John Eden; John Hedworth
