= Old Durham =

Hamlet in County Durham, England

Coordinates: 54°46.3′N 1°33.0′W

Old Durham is a hamlet in County Durham, in England. It is situated approximately 1 mile east of central Durham and south of Gilesgate.

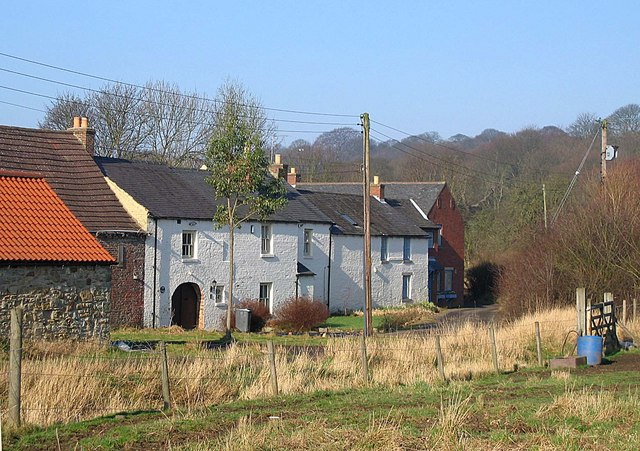
Houses in Old Durham

The most northerly remains of a Romanised farmstead in the Roman Empire were excavated at Old Durham during 1940s.

Old Durham's 17th-century gardens became a popular attraction, which led to the opening of the Pineapple Inn to provide refreshments for local visitors. The gardens used to belong to a 17th-century mansion belonging to the Heath family which was demolished in the 18th century.

In 1642 the marriage of John Tempest of the Isle (near Bradbury, County Durham) to Elizabeth Heath daughter and sole heiress of John Heath (1604–1664) brought the property to the Tempest family. Their son William Tempest, Member of Parliament for the City of Durham in 1678, 1680 and 1689 also resided here. The Tempests deserted Old Durham in favour of Sherburn and Wynyard in 1742 and were ancestors of the Vane-Tempest-Stewarts, Earls Vane and Marquesses of Londonderry

Old Durham was the site of a colliery with the Marquis of Londonderry's Lord Ernest pit opening in 1849.

The remains of a railway embankment cut across the area, which featured two bridges, leading to the now-demolished Elvet Station at the end of the Durham Sunderland Line.
