= Earl of Durham =

Title in the Peerage of the United Kingdom

Earldom of Durham
- Blazon Arms: Quarterly: 1st, Sable, a Fess between three Lambs passant Argent (Lambton); 2nd, Argent a Fess Gules between three Popinjays Vert, collard Gules (Lumley); 3rd, Argent, an Escutcheon Sable, within an Orle of eight Cinquefoils Gules (Hedworth); 4th, Argent, three Cinquefoils Gules (D'Arcy). Crests: 1st: A Ram's Head cabossed Argent, attired Sable (Lambton); 2nd: a Woman's Head affrontée, couped at the breast, proper, hair flowing Or, wreathed about the temples with a Garland of Cinquefoils Gules, pierced Or (Hedworth); 3rd: out of a Ducal Coronet Or, an Antelope's Head, isuant, winged Argent, attired and barbed Or (D'Arcy). Supporters: Dexter: a Lion Gules, ducally gorged Or, supporting a Flagstaff Or, therefrom flowing a Banner Azure, charged with a Cross-Potence; Sinister: a Lion Azure, ducally gorged Or, supporting a Flagstaff Or, therefrom flowing a Banner Azure, charged with a Lion passant guardant Or.
- Creation date: 23 March 1833
- Created by: King William IV
- Peerage: Peerage of the United Kingdom
- First holder: John Lambton, 1st Baron Durham
- Present holder: Edward Lambton, 7th Earl of Durham
- Heir apparent: Frederick Lambton, Viscount Lambton
- Subsidiary titles: Viscount Lambton; Baron Durham
- Status: Extant
- Motto: LE JOUR VIENDRA (The day will come)

Earl of Durham is a title in the Peerage of the United Kingdom. It was created in 1833 for the Whig politician and colonial official John Lambton, 1st Baron Durham. Known as "Radical Jack", he played a leading role in the passing of the Reform Act 1832. As Governor General of British North America, he was the author of the famous Report on the Affairs of British North America, known in Canada as the Durham Report. He had already been created Baron Durham, of the City of Durham and of Lambton Castle in the County Palatine of Durham, in 1828. He was created Viscount Lambton at the same time that he was raised to the earldom. These titles are also in the Peerage of the United Kingdom.

He was succeeded by his only surviving son, the second Earl. He served as Lord-Lieutenant of County Durham from 1854 to 1879. On his death, the titles passed to his eldest twin son, the third Earl. He was Lord-Lieutenant of County Durham from 1884 to 1928 and was made a Knight of the Garter in 1909. He died childless and was succeeded by his younger twin brother, the fourth Earl. He represented South Durham and South East Durham in the House of Commons. His grandson, the sixth Earl, was a Conservative politician. He disclaimed his peerage titles shortly after succeeding his father in 1970, but improperly continued to style himself Viscount Lambton. As of 2014, the titles are held by his only son, the seventh Earl, who succeeded in 2006. Before succeeding to the earldom, he styled himself Lord Durham to avoid confusion with his father.

Several other members of the Lambton family have also gained distinction. Both the first Earl's father, William Henry Lambton (1764–1797), and grandfather, Major-General John Lambton (1710–1794), as well as his great-uncle Henry Lambton (1697–1761), represented the City of Durham in Parliament. The Hon. Sir Hedworth Lambton (1856–1929) (who assumed the surname of Meux in lieu of Lambton), third son of the second Earl, was an Admiral of the Fleet. The Hon. Charles Lambton (1857–1949), fourth son of the second Earl, was a Brigadier-General in the Army. The Hon. George Lambton (1860–1945), fifth son of the second Earl, was a thoroughbred racehorse trainer who trained two Epsom Derby winners. The Hon. Sir William Lambton (1863–1936), sixth son of the second Earl, was a Major-General in the Army.

The ancestral seats of the Lambton family are Lambton Castle, near Chester-le-Street, County Durham, and Fenton Estate, near Wooler, Northumberland. The latter, about 2,000 acres (8.1 km^{2}), was put up for sale in 2015 with a guide price of £10 million.

The first earl was the inventor of Dominion Status throughout the British Empire, leading to the creation of the Commonwealth of Nations. Canada's title was the 'Dominion of Canada', discontinued in the 20th century, and now simply Canada. The Regional Municipality of Durham and Lambton County, both in the Canadian province of Ontario, are named after Lord Durham.

== Earls of Durham (1833) ==
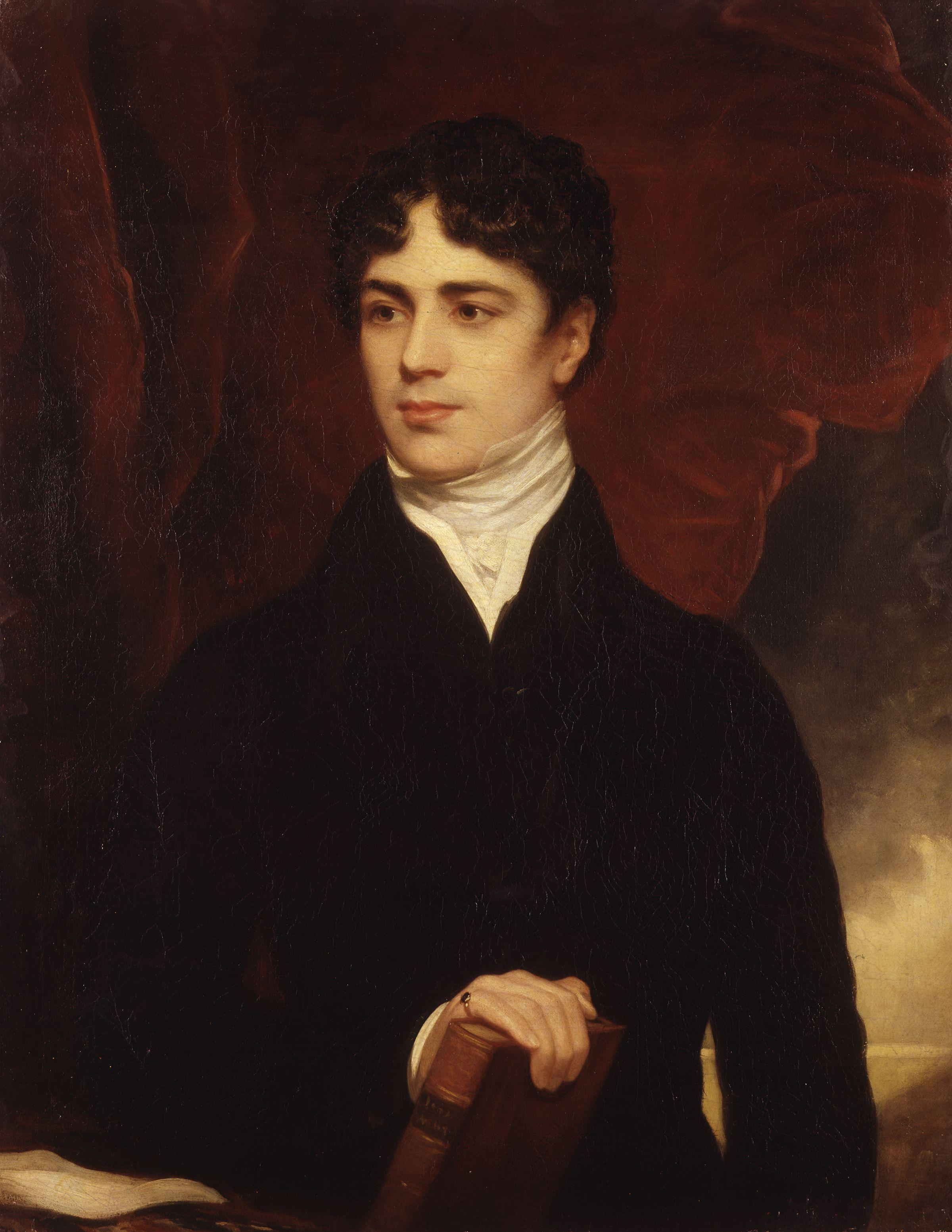
John Lambton, 1st Earl of Durham

- John George Lambton, 1st Earl of Durham (1792–1840)
- George Frederick d'Arcy Lambton, 2nd Earl of Durham (1828–1879); only son surviving to adulthood of the 1st Earl
- John George Lambton, 3rd Earl of Durham (1855–1928); eldest son of the 2nd Earl, died without legitimate male issue
- Frederick William Lambton, 4th Earl of Durham (1855–1929); second son of the 2nd Earl and younger twin brother of the 3rd Earl
- John Frederick Lambton, 5th Earl of Durham (1884–1970); eldest son of the 4th Earl
  - Roderick Lambton, Viscount Lambton (1920–1941); died without issue
- Antony Claud Frederick Lambton, 6th Earl of Durham (1922–2006) (disclaimed 1970); 2nd son of the 5th Earl
- Edward Richard Lambton, 7th Earl of Durham (b. 1961); only son of the 6th Earl

The heir apparent is the present holder's eldest son, Frederick Lambton, Viscount Lambton (b. 1985).
