= Anne Vane =

British royal mistress (1710–1736)

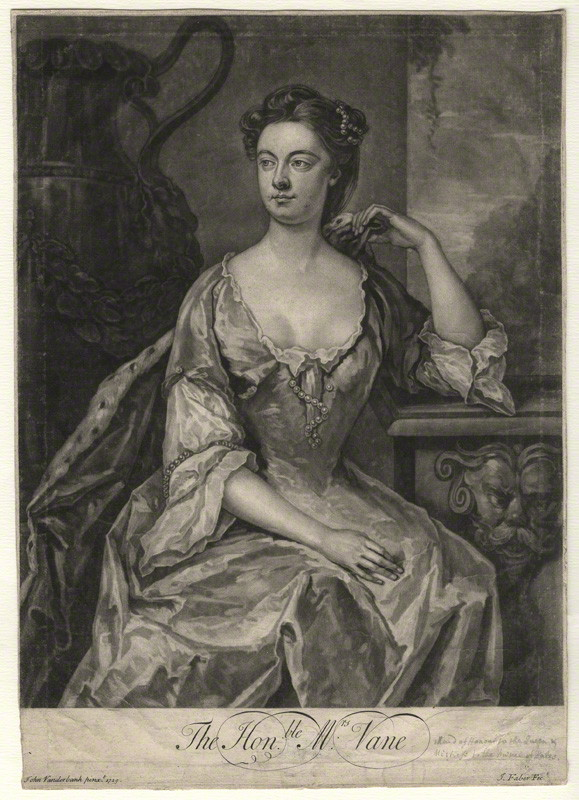
- by John Faber the Younger
- Born: Ann Vane; 17 September 1710; London, England
- Died: 1736 (aged 25–26); Bath, Somerset
- Known for: Royal mistress
- Partner: Frederick, Prince of Wales
- Relatives: Henry Vane, 1st Earl of Darlington (brother)

Anne Vane (17 September 1710 – 27 March 1736), also known as "the Hon. Mrs. Vane," was a maid of honour to Caroline of Ansbach and mistress to Caroline's son Frederick, Prince of Wales.

== Life ==
Vane was the first daughter of Gilbert Vane, second Baron Barnard, and sister to the politician Henry Vane who was the first Earl of Darlington. Her mother, Mary (born Randyll), was described as "scandalous" by her father-in-law (i.e. Anne's paternal grandfather), Christopher Vane, 1st Baron Barnard, and Anne inherited her reputation. Vane became a maid of honour to Caroline, Princess of Wales, who became queen consort in 1727 as the wife of George II. Vane's mother, Mary, died on 4 August 1728.

When Caroline's son Frederick came to England in 1728 and was in turn made Prince of Wales in 1729, he made Vane his mistress and publicly acknowledged her to the extent that Vane entertained his guests at her house in Soho Square. Vane had a son and afterwards recovered at St. James's Palace. It was well known that her son was named Cornwell Fitz-Frederick Vane. "Fitz-Frederick" means "child of Frederick", but Horace Walpole wrote that Lord Hervey and the first Lord Harrington each told Prime Minister Sir Robert Walpole that Cornwell was their son.

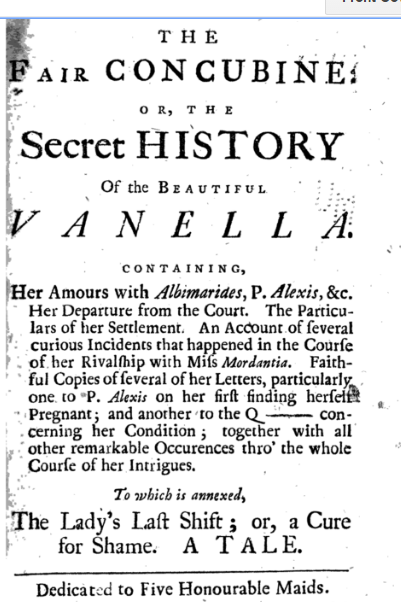
The Fair Concubine: Or, The Secret History of the Beautiful Vanella

In 1732, the Prince of Wales' courtier Lord Baltimore, acquired 50 Grosvenor Square as a home for Vane. In that year, Vane was parodied in a number of works including a book titled The Secret History of the Beautiful Vanella. The poems' theme is her aristocratic lovers and the ambiguous paternity of her children.

In 1734 Frederick and Anne were still a couple, but in 1735 Prince Frederick was engaged to marry Augusta of Saxe-Gotha. It was originally proposed that Vane should be sent abroad but she managed to resist this and was still able to keep her pension of £1600 per year.

In 1735 she moved to Bath. Her second child died the following year on 26 February 1736 in London, and Vane died in Bath, a few weeks later, on 27 March 1736.

== Legacy ==
There is an engraving of Mrs. Vane by John Faber Jr. after John Vanderbank. It is said that "she was the model for Hogarth's Anne Boleyn in the picture of 1729".

Dr Johnson wrote in the Vanity of Human Wishes: "Yet Vane could tell what ills from beauty spring;" referring to Anne, as distinct from her niece. His point is that "she generally ends her career betrayed, despised and distressed".
