= John Tempest Sr. =

John Tempest (23 April 1710 – 17 May 1776) of Sherburn and Wynyard, County Durham was a landowner and Member of Parliament.

He was born into the Old Durham branch of the Tempest family, the son of John Tempest (1679 – 1737) and Jane Wharton (1683 – 1736) and educated at St John's College, Oxford

He inherited the family's extensive landed interests, including the manors of Wynyard (purchased in 1742 for £8,000), The Isle, Kelloe, Old Durham, Brancepeth and Rainton, which helped make them among the largest shippers of coal via Sunderland in the late 18th century. He was Mayor of Hartlepool in 1747 and 1758 and represented the City of Durham in the Parliaments of 1741, 1747, 1754 and 1761.

He married Frances Shuttleworth (? – 1771) on 5 September 1738. Their son John Tempest Jr. succeeded him in Parliament. Tempest Sr. was an ancestor of the Vane-Tempest-Stewarts, Earls Vane and Marquesses of Londonderry.

Parliament of the United Kingdom
Preceded by John Shafto; Henry Lambton	Member of Parliament for City of Durham; 1742–1768; With: Henry Lambton to 1761; Ralph Gowland 1761–1782; John Lambton from 1762	Succeeded by John Lambton; John Tempest Jr.
