= Apreece baronets =

Escutcheon of the Apreece baronets of Washingley

The Apreece baronetcy, of Washingley in the County of Huntingdon, was a title in the Baronetage of Great Britain. It was created on 12 July 1782 for Thomas Apreece. Apreece was recognised for his role as commander of the Huntingdonshire Militia coastal defence force in 1779, during the American Revolutionary War, defending Alnwick from an attack by the flotilla led by John Paul Jones in the USS Bonhomme Richard as he sailed south.

The title became extinct on the death of the 2nd Baronet in 1842.

== Apreece baronets, of Washingley (1782) ==
- Sir Thomas Hussey Apreece, 1st Baronet (1744–1833)
- Sir Thomas George Apreece, 2nd Baronet (1791–1842)

== Extended family ==
Shuckburgh Ashby Apreece (1773–1807), elder son of the 1st Baronet, married in 1799 the future Lady Jane Davy as her first husband.

Baronetage of Great Britain
Preceded by Brisco baronets	Apreece baronets of Washingley; 12 July 1782	Succeeded by Vane baronets
