= John Tempest Jr. =

John Tempest Jr. (1739 – 12 August 1794) was a County Durham landowner and Tory politician who sat in the House of Commons from 1768 to 1794.

== Biography ==
A member of the Old Durham branch of the Tempest family, Tempest was born in Sherburn, Durham, the son of John Tempest of Wynyard (1710–1776) and Frances Shuttleworth. He was educated at Westminster School (1750) and Emmanuel College, Cambridge (1758).

He inherited his family's extensive landed interests including the manors of Wynyard, The Isle, Kelloe, Old Durham and Rainton, making him one of the largest shippers of coal via Sunderland in the late 18th century.

Tempest represented the City of Durham in the Parliaments of 1768, 1774, 1780, 1784 and 1790, and joined his fellow Durham MP John Lambton in constantly opposing the administration of Lord North. In 1784 he was a member of the St. Alban's Tavern group who tried to bring Fox and Pitt together.

== Family ==
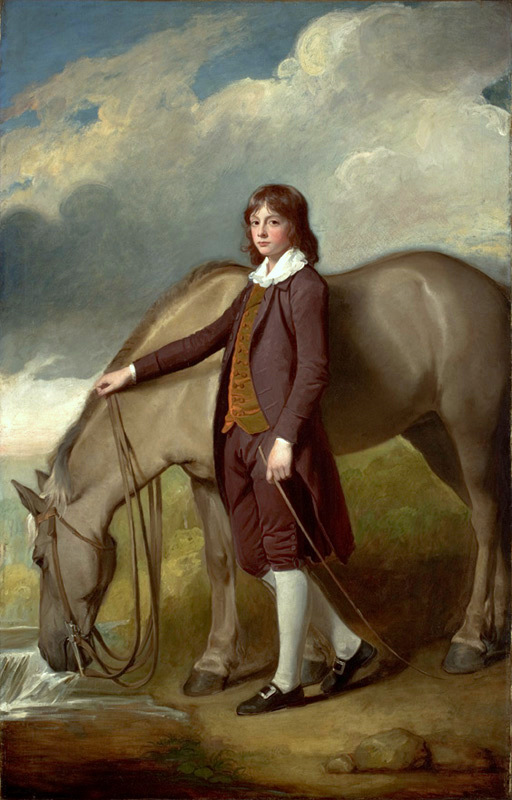
John Wharton Tempest by Romney

Tempest married Ann Townsend (?–1817) daughter of Joseph Townsend of Honington, Warwickshire. Their only son, John Wharton Tempest (1772–1793) (the subject of a painting by George Romney), predeceased them as a result of a riding accident.

The Tempest estates thus devolved to his nephew Henry, the son of a sister who had married the Rev. Sir Henry Vane Bt. of Long Newton, upon condition that his nephew assumed the name and arms of Tempest. Having fulfilled the requirement, Sir Henry Vane-Tempest, 2nd Baronet (1771–1813), also replaced his uncle as M.P. for Durham City on 17 October 1794 and was the ancestor of the Vane-Tempest-Stewarts, Earls Vane and Marquesses of Londonderry.

== Sources ==
- Robert Surtees, History of Durham (1816–1840)
- Brian Masters, Wynyard Hall and the Londonderry Family (1973)

Parliament of Great Britain
Preceded by John Tempest, Sr. John Lambton	Member of Parliament for City of Durham; 1768–1794; With: John Lambton to 1787; William Henry Lambton from 1787	Succeeded by William Henry Lambton; Sir Henry Vane-Tempest
