= Jane Davy =

- Born: 5 February 1780
- Died: 5 August 1855 (aged 75); Park Street, London
- Known for: being a socialite
- Spouse: Sir Humphry Davy

Jane Davy or Jane Kerr or Jane Apreece (5 February 1780 – 8 May 1855) was a British heiress and socialite who, after having lost a rich husband, married Sir Humphry Davy.

== Life ==
Jane Kerr's (Davy's) father was Charles Kerr, a Scottish merchant who operated in Antigua. Her mother was Jane Kerr (formerly Tweedie). Her father had made his fortune through the sale of various Prizes of War, including the sale of their cargoes and the sale/lease of slaves, as well as various other business activities on the island. Kerr's father died in 1796, dividing his fortune between his daughter Jane and his wife (who later remarried). It was reported at the time that Jane enjoyed an annual income of £4,000 and had £60,000 in capital.

Kerr came to notice when she married Shuckburgh Ashby Apreece who was the heir to the Apreece baronetcy but he died before his father in 1807. Kerr (then Apreece) was a rich widow who had travelled in Europe and she moved to Edinburgh where she established herself at the centre of Scottish literary society. It was said that she had inspired the character of Corinne who was the protagonist in Anne Louise Germaine de Staël's 1807 novel. She had met Germaine de Staël but that influence is more reliably assigned to Diodata Saluzzo Roero.

She turned down a proposal to become the wife of the elder Professor John Playfair and instead accepted the proposal of the celebrity scientist Sir Humphry Davy. The new couple travelled to Paris, Florence and then Rome accompanied by Michael Faraday. During the trip Davy received a medal from Napoleon and Davy and Faraday proved that diamonds were flammable. They returned to England when Napoleon escaped from Elba.

They continued to travel in Europe, but increasingly they travelled separately as they had a difficult relationship. Nevertheless, Lady Davy travelled to Rome when she heard that her husband had been taken ill there, and she accompanied him to Geneva where he died in 1829.

Davy died in Park Street in London in 1855. and was buried in the family vault at St. Sepulchre's Church, Northampton.

At the time of her death in 1855, her fortune had reached £180,000. She left her fortune to her first cousin, with which he purchased a large house and estate by the River Severn in Gloucestershire.
