= John Tempest (1679–1738) =

English politician

John Tempest (1679 – 1738) was an English Tory politician. He served as MP for County Durham from 5 March 1707 till 1708.

He was baptised on 17 April 1679, He was the first son of William Tempest. On 24 June 1706, he married Jane (died 1736), the daughter of Richard Wharton and they had two sons and three daughters.

In March 1700, he inherited the Durham estates of his father. In January 1701, he unsuccessfully contested Durham. In 1707, he was returned unopposed in a county by-election. He died in 1738 and was buried at St Giles Church, Durham on 30 January 1738. His eldest son, John Tempest sat as MP for Durham.
