= Bradbury, County Durham =

Coordinates: 54°39′N 1°30′W

Bradbury
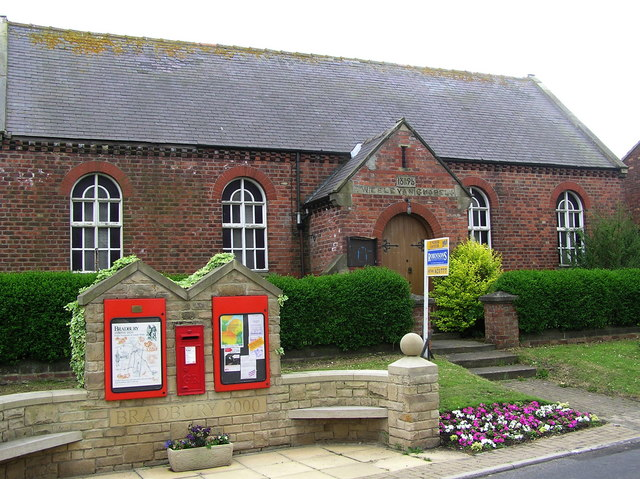
- The Wesleyan Chapel in Bradbury, built in 1895 and offered for sale in 2006

- Location within County Durham
- Civil parish: Bradbury and the Isle
- Unitary authority: County Durham
- Ceremonial county: Durham
- Region: North East
- Country: England
- Sovereign state: United Kingdom

Bradbury is a village in the County Durham district, in the ceremonial county of Durham, England. It is situated between Sedgefield and Newton Aycliffe, close to the A1(M) and A689, and is approximately 16 km (9.9 mi) from Middlesbrough. Bradbury is a small agricultural village. The moorland around it is of glacial origin.

It is part of the civil parish of Bradbury and the Isle, along with the hamlets of Great Isle and Little Isle. 'The Isles' is an area in the parish located by the River Skerne. Historically, the river has been prone to flooding here; when flooded a number of small islands of land remain above the floodwaters. These include Great Isle and Little Isle, on which stand Great Isle farm and the hamlet of Little Isle, respectively. The parish had a population of 95 according to the 2001 census, increasing to 133 at the 2011 census.
