= Lambton Castle =

Stately home in County Durham, England

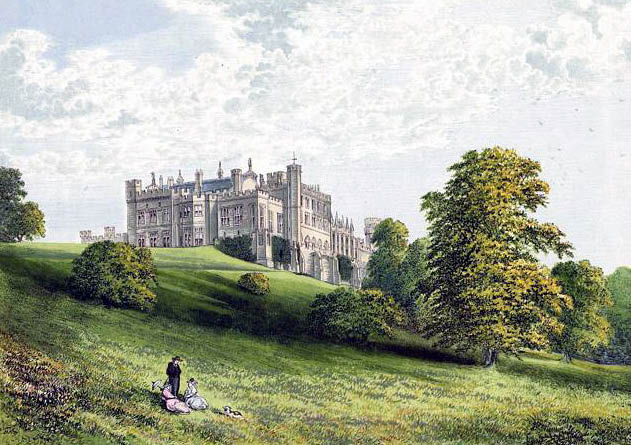
- Lambton Castle in the late 19th century

- Location within County Durham

General information
- Type: Stately home
- Location: Chester-le-Street, County Durham, England
- Coordinates: 54.867°N 1.536°W; NZ298526

Design and construction
- Designations: Grade II* listed building

Lambton Castle stands above Chester-le-Street, County Durham and is a stately home, the ancestral seat of the Lambton family, the Earls of Durham. It is listed in the mid-category of listed building, Grade II*.

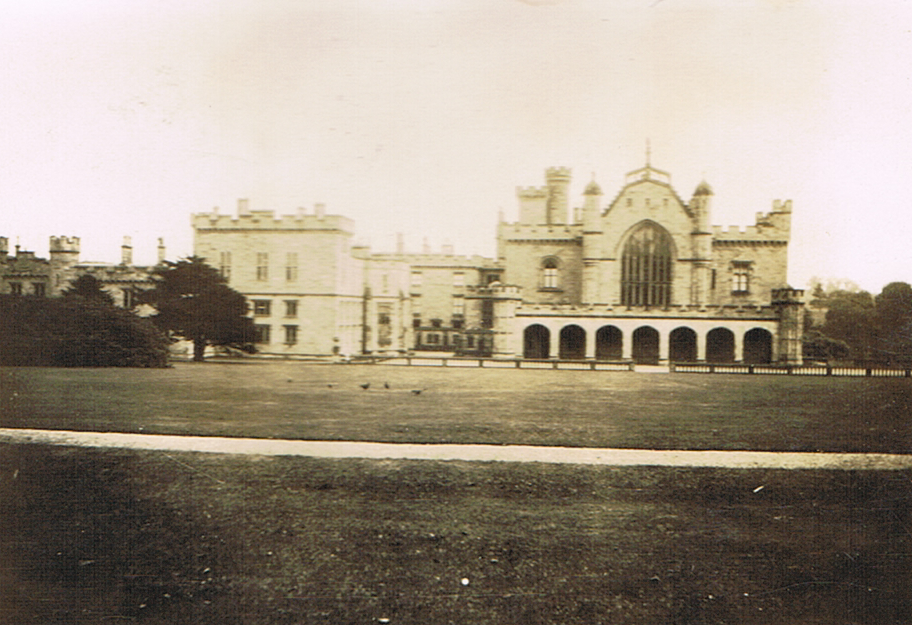
The Entrance of Lambton Castle in 1929. Everything on the right hand side of the picture (including the Great Hall, the roof of which can clearly be seen) has been demolished, along with the end of the wing that was built out towards the location of the camera. The crenellated towers on the end of the entrance portico were rebuilt to suit the narrower facade.

== History ==
Largely constructed as it is between 1820 and 1828 by John Lambton, first Earl of Durham and one-time Governor General of Canada, it was built around Harraton Hall, a 17th-century mansion. The castle was designed by architects Joseph Bonomi the Elder and his son Ignatius and built in the style of a Norman castle, as was the fashion of the time.

Later additions to the house built by Sydney Smirke in 1862–65, including the great hall, were largely demolished in 1932. The structure had suffered from subsidence. In the 1930s the family moved to the smaller Biddick Hall on the estate.

The park that surrounds the castle is bordered by a high wall. The family keep going its annual pheasant shoot. The grounds from 1972 until 1980 accommodated a venture which closed, Lambton Lion Park.

Later the family have sold Biddick Woods enabling a link road from the A182 to the A690 in Houghton-le-Spring and new business units.

In 2012, the castle was the setting of the BBC One drama The Paradise.

On 30 December 2015 plans for the estate's development were submitted to the local planning authority to help fund park upkeep and conservation, with a vision to turn the castle into a wedding venue, boutique hotel or both, aiming to spend £26 million to £28.5 million on building and labour. The plans were submitted by the Trustees of Lord Durham’s 1989 Voluntary Settlement, which manages the estate on behalf of the family.

== See also ==
- Castles in Great Britain and Ireland
- List of castles in England
