= County Durham (constituency) =

Parliamentary constituency in the United Kingdom, 1801–1832

Durham
- Former county constituency for the House of Commons
- County: Durham

1675–1832
- Seats: Two
- Replaced by: Gateshead, North Durham, South Durham and South Shields

Durham, also County Durham or Durham County was a county constituency in northern England, which elected two Members of Parliament (MPs) to the House of Commons from 1675 until 1832.

== History ==
The constituency consisted of the whole county of Durham (including the enclaves of Norhamshire, Islandshire and Bedlington, all situated within the boundaries of Northumberland and now part of that county, and of Crayke, now in North Yorkshire).

Because of its semi-autonomous status as a county palatine, Durham had not been represented in Parliament during the medieval period; from 1543 it was the only part of England which elected no MPs. In 1621, Parliament passed a bill to enfranchise the county, but James I refused it the royal assent, as he considered that the House of Commons already had too many members and that some decayed boroughs should be abolished first; a similar bill in 1624 failed to pass the House of Lords. During the Commonwealth, County Durham was allowed to send members to the First and Second Parliaments of the Protectorate, though the privilege was not maintained when Parliament reverted to its earlier electoral arrangements from 1658. After the Restoration, Durham's right to return MPs was recognised in 1661, and finally confirmed by the Durham (Representation of) Act 1672 (25 Cha. 2. c. 9); however, it did not come into effect until 1675 when the Speaker was authorised to issue his warrant. The county returned two members, and the same act also established Durham City as a parliamentary borough with its own two members.

As in other county constituencies, until 1832 the franchise was defined by the Forty Shilling Freeholder Act 1430, which gave the right to vote to every man who possessed freehold property within the county valued at £2 or more per year for the purposes of land tax; it was not necessary for the freeholder to occupy his land, nor even in later years to be resident in the county at all.

By the time of the Reform Act 1832, the county had a population of just over 250,000, although this was slightly reduced by the boundary changes which severed the enclaves and made them part of Northumberland or the North Riding of Yorkshire for parliamentary purposes. The electorate was only a fraction of this number: at the general election of 1790, 5,578 voted, and in 1820 the number was only 3,741. Although nobody could exert the degree of control over the voters that was common in many boroughs, several of the major local landowners had significant influence, in particular the Vane Earls of Darlington.

In 1832 the county's representation was doubled, and the constituency divided into two new two-member constituencies, North Durham and South Durham.

== Members of Parliament ==
Election	First member	First party	Second member	Second party
1654	George Lilburne		Robert Lilburne	
1656	Thomas Lilburne		James Clavering, Bt	
June 1675	John Tempest	Royalist	Thomas Vane	
October 1675	John Tempest	Royalist	Christopher Vane	
February 1679	John Tempest	Anti-exclusionist	Sir Robert Eden, Bt	Anti-exclusionist
August 1679	William Bowes	Unclear	Thomas Fetherstonhalgh	
1681	William Bowes	Unclear	Thomas Fetherstonhalgh	
1685	Robert Byerley	Tory	William Lambton	Tory
1689	Robert Byerley	Tory	William Lambton	Tory
1690	Sir Robert Eden, Bt	Tory	William Lambton	Tory
1695	Sir William Bowes	Unclear	William Lambton	Tory
1698	Sir Robert Eden, Bt	Country/Tory	Lionel Vane	Unclear
1701 (Jan)	William Lambton	Tory	Lionel Vane	Unclear
1701 (Nov)	William Lambton	Tory	Lionel Vane	Whig
1702	Sir Robert Eden, Bt	Tory	Sir William Bowes	Unclear
1705	Sir Robert Eden, Bt	Tory	Sir William Bowes	Unclear
1707	Sir Robert Eden, Bt	Tory	John Tempest	Tory
1708	Sir Robert Eden, Bt	Tory	William Vane, of West Auckland	Whig
1710	Sir Robert Eden, Bt	Tory	William Lambton	Tory
1713	Sir John Eden	Tory	John Hedworth	Independent Whig
1715	Sir John Eden	Tory	John Hedworth	Independent Whig
1722	Sir John Eden	Tory	John Hedworth	Independent Whig
1727	George Bowes	Whig	John Hedworth	Independent Whig
1734	George Bowes	Whig	John Hedworth	Independent Whig
1741	George Bowes	Whig	John Hedworth	Independent Whig
1747	George Bowes	Patriot Whig	Hon. Henry Vane	Whig
1753 by-election	George Bowes	Patriot Whig	Hon. Henry Vane	Whig
1754	George Bowes	Patriot Whig	Hon. Henry Vane	Whig
1758 by-election	George Bowes	Patriot Whig	Captain the Hon. Raby Vane	
1760 by-election	Robert Shafto	Tory (probable)	Captain the Hon. Raby Vane	
1761	Robert Shafto	Tory (probable)	Hon. Frederick Vane	
1768	Sir Thomas Clavering, Bt	Whig	Hon. Frederick Vane	
1774	Sir Thomas Clavering, Bt	Whig	Sir John Eden, Bt	Whig
1780	Sir Thomas Clavering, Bt	Whig	Sir John Eden, Bt	Whig
1784	Sir Thomas Clavering, Bt	Whig	Sir John Eden, Bt	Whig
1790	Rowland Burdon	Tory	Captain Ralph Milbanke	Whig
1796	Rowland Burdon	Tory	Captain Ralph Milbanke	Whig
1802	Rowland Burdon	Tory	Captain Ralph Milbanke	Whig
1806	Sir Thomas Liddell, Bt	Tory	Captain Ralph Milbanke	Whig
1807	Sir Henry Vane-Tempest, Bt	Tory	Captain Ralph Milbanke	Whig
1812	Sir Henry Vane-Tempest, Bt	Tory	Viscount Barnard	Whig
1813 by-election	John George Lambton	Radical	Viscount Barnard	Whig
1815 by-election	John George Lambton	Radical	Hon. William Powlett	Whig
1818	John George Lambton	Radical	Hon. William Powlett	Whig
1820	John George Lambton	Radical	Hon. William Powlett	Whig
1826	John George Lambton	Radical	Hon. William Powlett	Whig
1828 by-election	William Russell	Whig	Hon. William Powlett	Whig
1830	William Russell	Whig	Hon. William Powlett	Whig
1831	William Russell	Whig	Sir Hedworth Williamson, Bt	Whig
1832	Constituency divided. See North Durham and South Durham			

== See also ==
- History of parliamentary constituencies and boundaries in Durham
