= Sir Robert Eden, 1st Baronet, of West Auckland =

English lawyer and politician (c.1644–1720)

Sir Robert Eden, 1st Baronet, of West Auckland MP (c. 1644 – 1720) was an English lawyer and Tory politician. He sat as MP for County Durham in March 1679, 1690, 1698, 1702, 1705, 1708, and 1710.

He was the first son John Eden (died 1675) and Catherine, the daughter of Sir Thomas Layton. He was educated at Queen's College, Oxford and matriculated on 2 August 1661 at the age of 17. He entered the Middle Temple in 1664 and was called to the bar in 1670. After 7 April 1669, he married Margaret (died 2 July 1730) the daughter and heiress of John Lambton and they had eight sons (at least two predeceased him) and six daughters. He was created a baronet on 13 November 1672.

He died in 1720 and was buried at Auckland St. Helen on 17 May 1720.

Baronetage of England
Preceded by Title established	Baronet (of West Auckland); 1672–1720	Succeeded by Sir John Eden, 2nd Baronet
