= Militia and Volunteers of County Durham =

The Militia and Volunteers of County Durham are those military units raised in the County independent of the regular Army. The "modern" militia dates from legislation enacted during the Seven Years' War. The volunteers had several forms and separate periods of existence until made a permanent body in 1859.

== Militia ==
Durham Militia
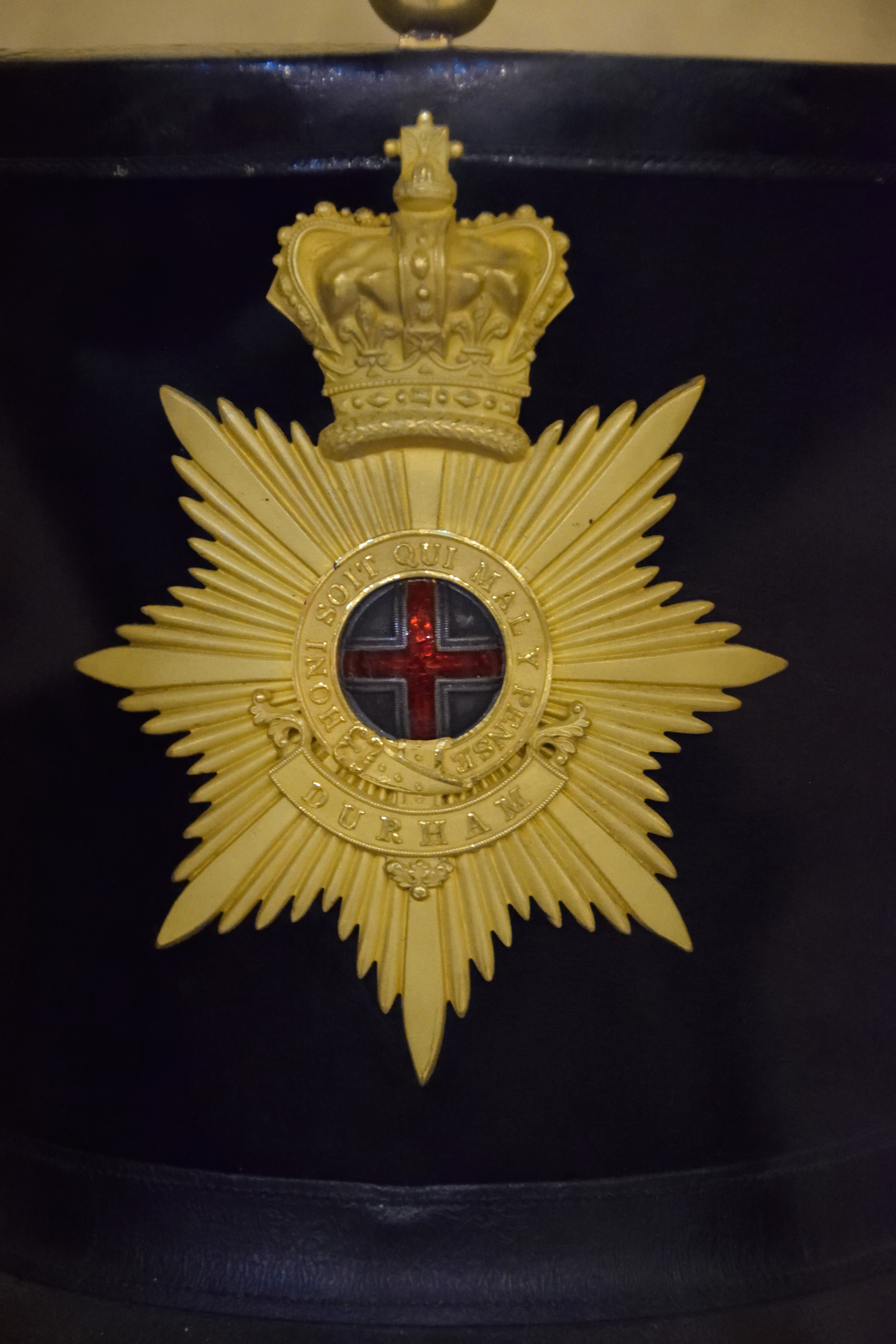
- Shako plate of the Durham Militia, 1850s from the Durham Light Infantry museum
- Active: 1759—1908
- Disbanded: 1953
- Country: Great Britain; United Kingdom
- Branch: Militia
- Type: Infantry
- Size: One Battalion to 1859; Two Battalions to 1908
- Engagements: Second Boer War

After the invasion scare of 1745, and the later strain on the regular army during the Seven Years' War, bills for the reform of the militia were brought to Parliament, but it was not until 1759 that the Militia Act 1757 (30 Geo. 2. c. 25) would be passed. The act continued with the ballot to select men from each county, in numbers based on a return made by the county authorities of men of eligible age, initially between 18 and 50 years of age. As a substitute could be made on payment of £10, the burden fell on the working classes. Subsequent explanatory legislation was required to curb rioting in 13 counties over fears of pay and overseas service, the militia would only be used in England and Wales. When not embodied (mobilised) for service the men had an annual training requirement of 28 days by 1762. The legislation was continually amended, for example, by the end of the Napoleonic wars, to permit wider service in the country, fixed terms of service and paying a bounty for volunteering for the regular army.

The militia was under the control of the Lord Lieutenant of the county and was to be officered by the local gentry, their rank determined by a property qualification which was gradually reduced or ignored.

=== General militia ===
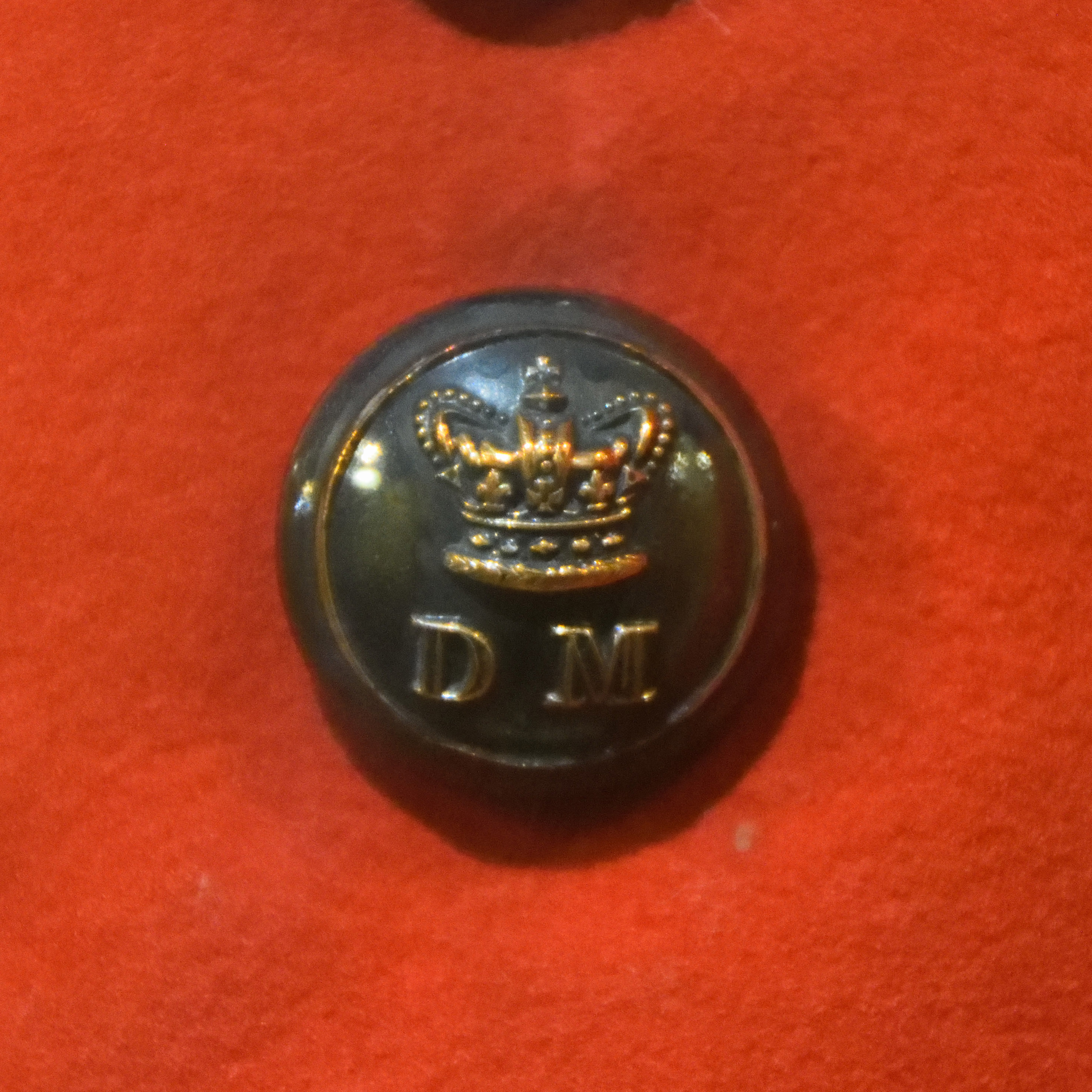
Officer's coatee button of the Durham Militia c. 1850s from the Durham Light Infantry museum

The regiment of the Durham Militia did not form until 1759, it was led by Henry Vane, 2nd Earl of Darlington, and had an initial strength of 369 men, with the headquarters at Barnard Castle (the Vanes lived nearby in Raby Castle). The first bandmaster of the regiment was William Herschel. The militia regiment in its early form was embodied on the following occasions:

- During the Seven Years' War from 22 February 1760 to early 1763, it served briefly at Pontefract, where, in November 1761, it had a strength of 23 Officers, 16 Serjeants, 16 Drummers and 396 Other ranks formed in eight companies. The uniforms had green facings.
- During the American Revolutionary War from 26 March 1778 to 1783, when France had joined the Americans, it served locally in Scarborough and Whitby, and was composed of six companies. It was ranked 44th in order of militia precedence by drawing of lots annually in June 1778, then 30th, 35th, 32nd and 44th. The uniforms had purple facings.
- During the French Revolutionary Wars from end 1792 until May 1802 the regiment was tasked with maintaining order as well as anti-invasion duties and for this purpose they were employed outside of their area of recruitment and kept on the move so as to avoid fraternization with the local population. On the death of Henry Vane in 1792, the regiment was led by his son William Vane, 1st Duke of Cleveland. The regiment was moved at regular intervals, Whitby, 1793, where it had a strength of 289 all ranks, Scarborough, 1794, Morpeth and Alnwick, 1795, Yarmouth, 1796, where it had 14 officers, 20 serjeants, 20 corporals, 12 drummers, 375 privates. Then to Hull, 1797, where the establishment raised to 1300+, and the strength rose to 800 men, Burstwick camp, 1798, now 1200 men strong, where large numbers volunteer for the regular army, and by the end of 1799, the strength had fallen to 439 all ranks. Lastly, back to Yarmouth, 1800, Sunderland, 1801 and Barnard Castle in 1802 to disband. For this whole embodiment it was ranked 10th in order of precedence, in lots drawn in 1793, (Note: As a cost saving measure as the regiments's number was incorporated into the uniform.) the uniform for which had buff or pale yellow facings.
- Less than a year later, after the short-lived Peace of Amiens, the regiment was once again embodied from March 1803 to August 1814 during the Napoleonic Wars, with an initial strength of 14 officers, 26 serjeants, 9 drummers, 401 rank and file, and was ranked 25th in order of precedence in lots drawn in 1803, the uniform had white facings. The regiment was stationed in Hull, 1803, Chelmsford Barracks, 1804, escorting French prisoners to and guarding them at Norman Cross Barracks, 1805, Woodbridge Barracks, 1806, Portsmouth, 1808, where some 168 men joined the 68th Regiment and others the 43rd Regiment and the 53rd Regiment, they also suppressed a rising of prisoners on board a prison ship. They stayed in Sunderland for two years, before moving North to Musselburgh, 1812, Perth, 1813 and Glasgow in 1814, returning to Barnard Castle to disband later that year. (Note: In November 1808, Private Robert Innard was returning home from Portsmouth on sick leave, when the ship he was on was captured by French privateers. He escaped in January 1814.)
- After Napoleon escaped from Elba the regiment was once more embodied from 14 July 1815 to 28 February 1816, it was much weaker with initially only 25 officers, 18 serjeants, 9 drummers, 156 rank and file. It served in Glasgow, where by the end of 1815 its strength had risen to 232 other ranks. The regiment was disbanded at Barnard Castle on 28 February 1816.

The last annual training for balloted men was in 1825, and was held only once or twice in the next few years, as the militia was allowed to fall into disuse, and the Durham militia dwindled to only a small headquarters staff. At the end of 1833 this amounted to a captain, a serjeant-major (the captain's son), 12 serjeants, a drum-major and four drummers, and by 1844 was only the serjeant-major and six serjeants. In 1840 the Colonelcy of the Durham Militia was held by William Vane, 1st Duke of Cleveland, and after his death in 1842 it passed on to his son Henry Vane, 2nd Duke of Cleveland.

=== 1852 Reformed Militia ===
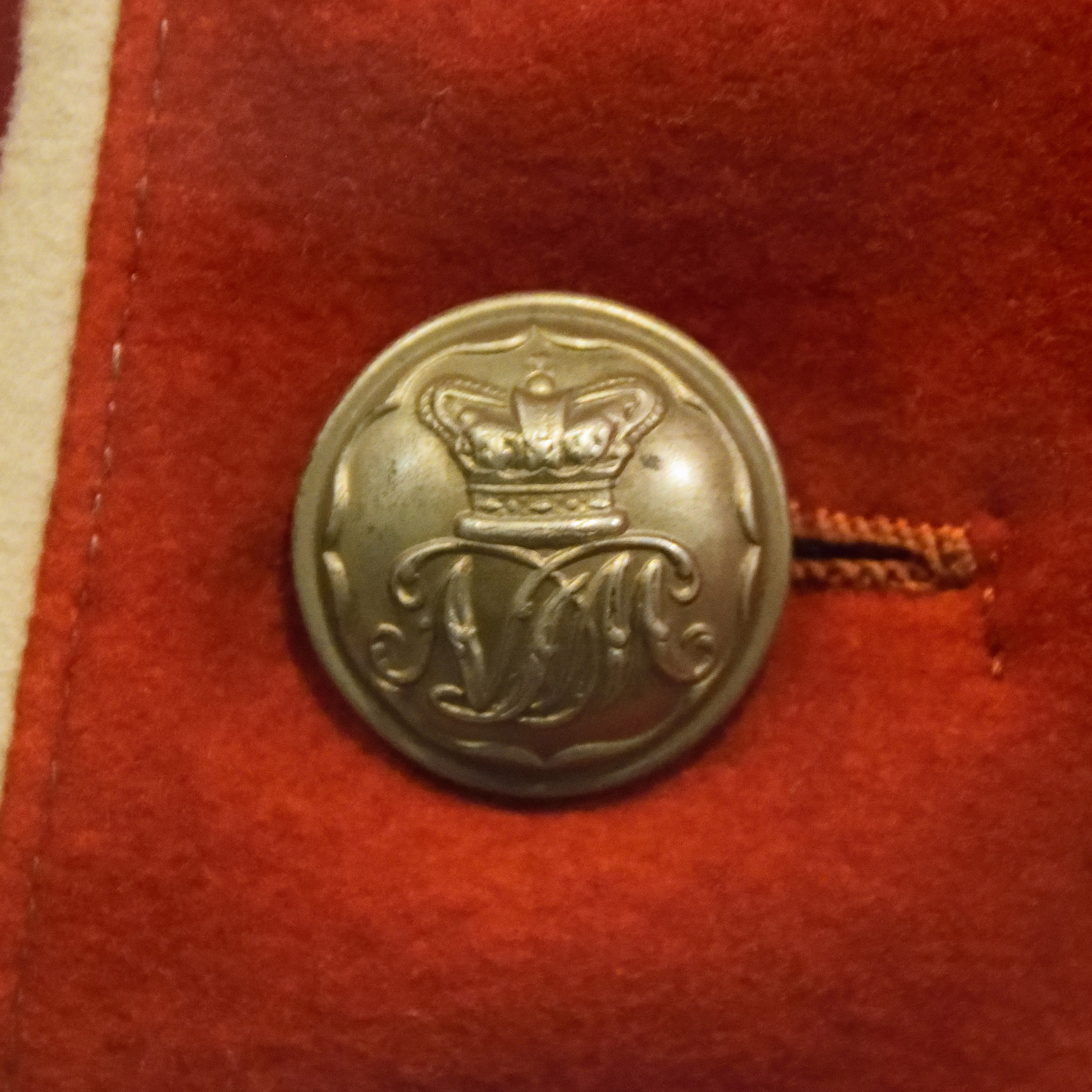
Band boy's tunic button of the North Durham Militia c. 1860s from the Durham Light Infantry museum

In 1852 a new Militia Act was passed that revived the militia, and County Durham was ordered to provide 1096 men (or 2000 men including artillery). However, with the ballot having been suppressed in 1830, the response was weak. The first recruits were trained in two batches at Barnard Castle at the end of the year. In 1853 the existing Durham Militia was split into two regiments: the 1st (or South) Durham Militia, with its headquarters at Barnard Castle and the 2nd (or North) Durham Militia, headquartered in Durham. An artillery brigade of four (later five) batteries, the Durham Artillery Militia, was newly raised at Bishop Auckland in July 1853, moving its headquarters to Hartlepool in 1861.

During the Crimean War both infantry regiments were embodied, the 1st regiment from December 1855 to May 1856, which remained at Barnard Castle and the 2nd regiment from March 1855 to May 1856, which spent the last few months at Burnley. Both were understrength, with a total of 630 man of all ranks between them. neither were among those embodied during the manpower shortage caused by the Indian Mutiny. However, the Durham Artillery Militia were embodied during the latter stages of the Mutiny from 5 April 1859 to 25 March 1861, serving in the garrison of Gosport and Portsmouth. In 1860 the 1st regiment was made a Fusilier regiment, the 1st Durham (Fusilier) Militia. The revival of the Volunteer forces led to competition for the available manpower. The rise of local constabularies meant that the militia would be used less for keeping order than to replace regular soldiers on home service during large mobilizations.

=== Reforms and Amalgamation ===
New legislation increased ease with which militia officers and men could transfer to the regular army, and resulted it becoming, as Cardwell wanted, more of an auxiliary to the regular line regiments. In 1881, after being brigaded with, but seldom interacting with, the Volunteer units of the County since 1873, the 1st Durham (Fusilier) Militia became the 3rd (Militia) Battalion and the 2nd (North) Durham Militia became the 4th (Militia) Battalion of the newly created Durham Light Infantry. The 3rd battalion was embodied for six months in 1885, as a consequence of the Mahdist War, and was stationed at Colchester.

The nation's Artillery Militia was reorganised into 11 divisions of garrison artillery in 1882, and the Durham unit, with a sixth battery, became the senior Militia unit in the new Northern Division, taking the title of 2nd Brigade, Northern Division, RA' (the 1st Brigade comprised the Regular RA units of the division). When the Northern Division was abolished in 1889 the title was altered to The Durham Artillery (Western Division) RA. The unit's HQ transferred from Hartlepool to Sunderland Barracks in 1895.

For the first and only time, the militia battalions would not only be embodied, but also see action during the Second Boer War. The 3rd battalion was embodied on 5 December 1899, with a strength of 826 officers and men. It served in the Cape Colony and the Orange Free State, guarding lines of communication and escorting convoys, and garrisoning Dewetsdorp for six months. During its time there it lost 29 officers and men. The 4th battalion was embodied twice, first from 23 January to 4 December 1900, when it remained in Aldershot, and from 6 January 1902 to 3 October 1902 when, with a strength of 852 officers and men, it was split into small detachments around the Cape and Free State. The 4th lost 16 men. The Durham Artillery was embodied 1 May to 11 October 1900, a Service Company volunteered for overseas service and was sent to Zululand where they distinguished themselves fighting as infantry in the defence of Fort Prospect.

From 1902 most units of the Militia artillery formally became part of the Royal Garrison Artillery, the unit at Sunderland taking the title of The Durham RGA (M).

=== Haldane Reforms ===
In 1908, in large part due to the Militias' resistance to more reform, the militia were reduced to the Special Reserve, a draft finding and training organisation, by the Territorial and Reserve Forces Act 1907. Now renamed the "Reserve" (and if a second battalion existed an "Extra Reserve"), the militia battalion would take over the running of the regimental Depot, being part of the local garrison. War office plans for the 3rd battalion to stay in the depot and any 4th battalion to be mobilized for action, led to the two Durham battalions swapping numbers, as the older battalion wished to remain as a fighting unit. Both battalions remained in Britain during World War I. (Note: Only 5 out of 23 of the "Extra Reserve" battalions served overseas.) They were not reformed after the war, the role of the original militia no longer existing, and were finally disbanded after a long period of suspended animation in 1953.

Although most of the Durham RGA (M) volunteered to transfer to the Special Reserve Royal Field Artillery, these units were disbanded in March 1909.

== Volunteers ==
Durham Fencibles and Volunteers
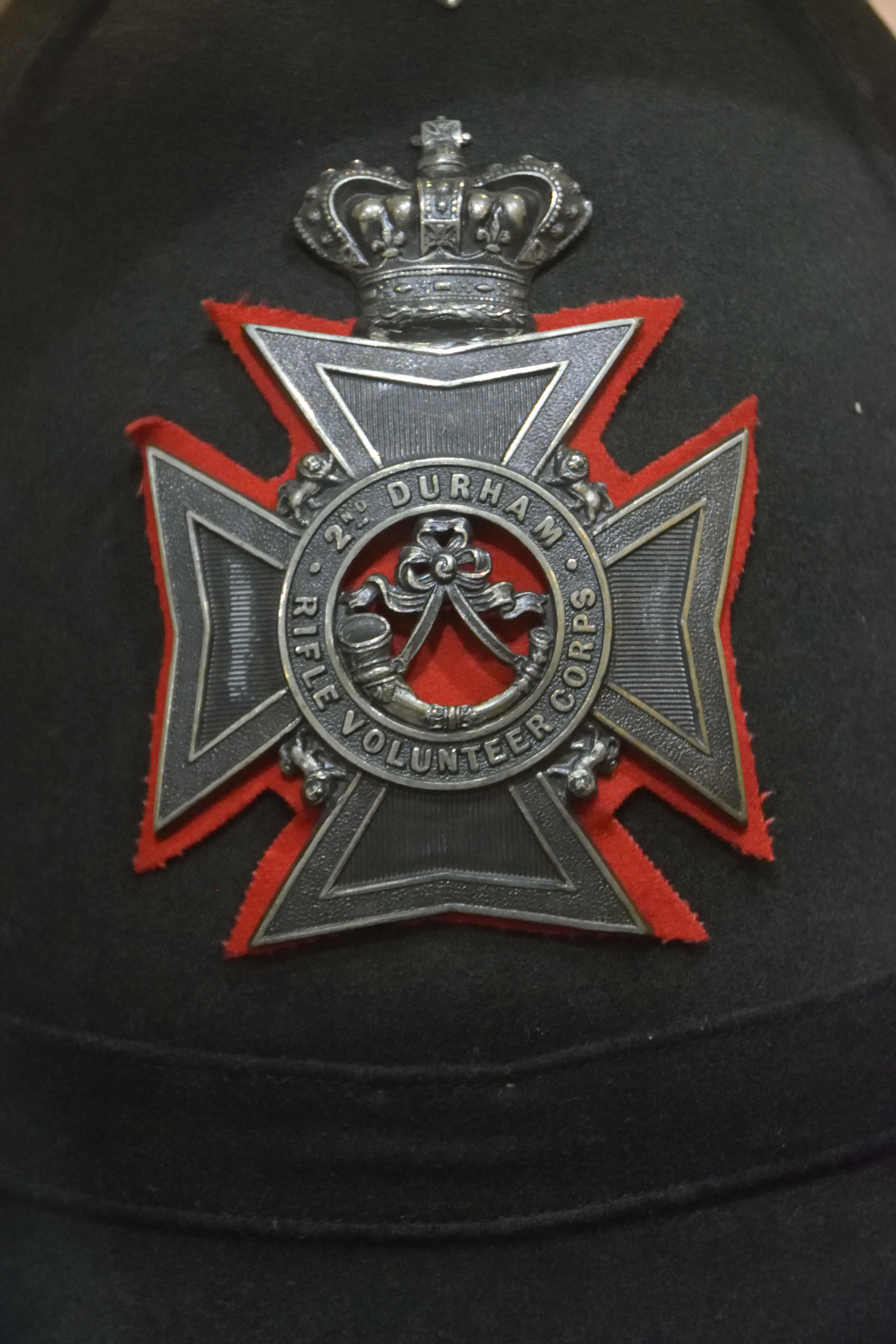
- Home Service Helmet badge of the 2nd (Administrative battalion) Durham Rifle Volunteer Corps, pre 1881 from the Durham Light Infantry museum
- Active: 1758—1908
- Disbanded: 1968
- Country: Great Britain; United Kingdom
- Branch: Volunteers
- Type: Artillery, Cavalry, Infantry
- Size: One Battalion 1758—1761; Multiple platoon to company size units 1792—1816; Five battalions 1861—1908
- Engagements: Battle of Arklow; Second Boer War

It was initially intended in the Militia, etc. Act 1778 (18 Geo. 3. c. 59) to permit volunteers to augment the militia, however only 14 companies had been added nationwide by 1780. In 1782 a new act, the Volunteers Act 1782 (22 Geo. 3. c. 79), allowed raising of volunteer forces by local subscription, with a wealthy land-owners or businessman providing most of the funding, but with the government paying them for any service and allowing the men to be court-marshalled only under volunteer officers.

=== Early Volunteers and Fencibles ===
The first "modern" raising of volunteers in County Durham occurred in 1745 during the Jacobite Rebellion when the neglect of the militia in previous years meant that, in effect, there was none. The Durham Association Regiment was raised in September by George Bowes and consisted of six troops of cavalry of 25 to 30 men each. It was disbanded by the authorities in November due to its over-zealous patrolling and the inhibition of the movements of "Papists and Non-Jurors".

During the Revolutionary Wars the county would raise two Fencible regiments, composed of volunteers under regular officers, they could not be sent overseas. The first raised in 1794 was the Durham Fencible Cavalry, changing its name the next year to the Princess of Wales's Fencible Cavalry as a genuine expression of loyalty. It was led by William Vane, who was also Colonel of the Militia. After spending three years in Scotland, in June 1798 it was sent to Ireland with a strength of around 250 men, where it operated against the Irish rebels on the River Boyne, it was disbanded at Clonmel in September 1800. The second regiment was raised in 1795, the Loyal Durham Regiment of Fencible Infantry, and after spending time in Gurnsey was sent to Ireland in May 1797. Sent to Dublin from Ulster when the rebellion broke out, some 315 of them were sent to Arklow in impressed carriages, arriving there a few hours before the battle. Here, under their fiery commander, Colonel John Skerrett, they formed a line South of the Coolgreany Road and with the two battalion guns they had brought with them, aided the militia and regulars in beating back the rebels. It was disbanded in 1802.

=== Volunteer Corps ===
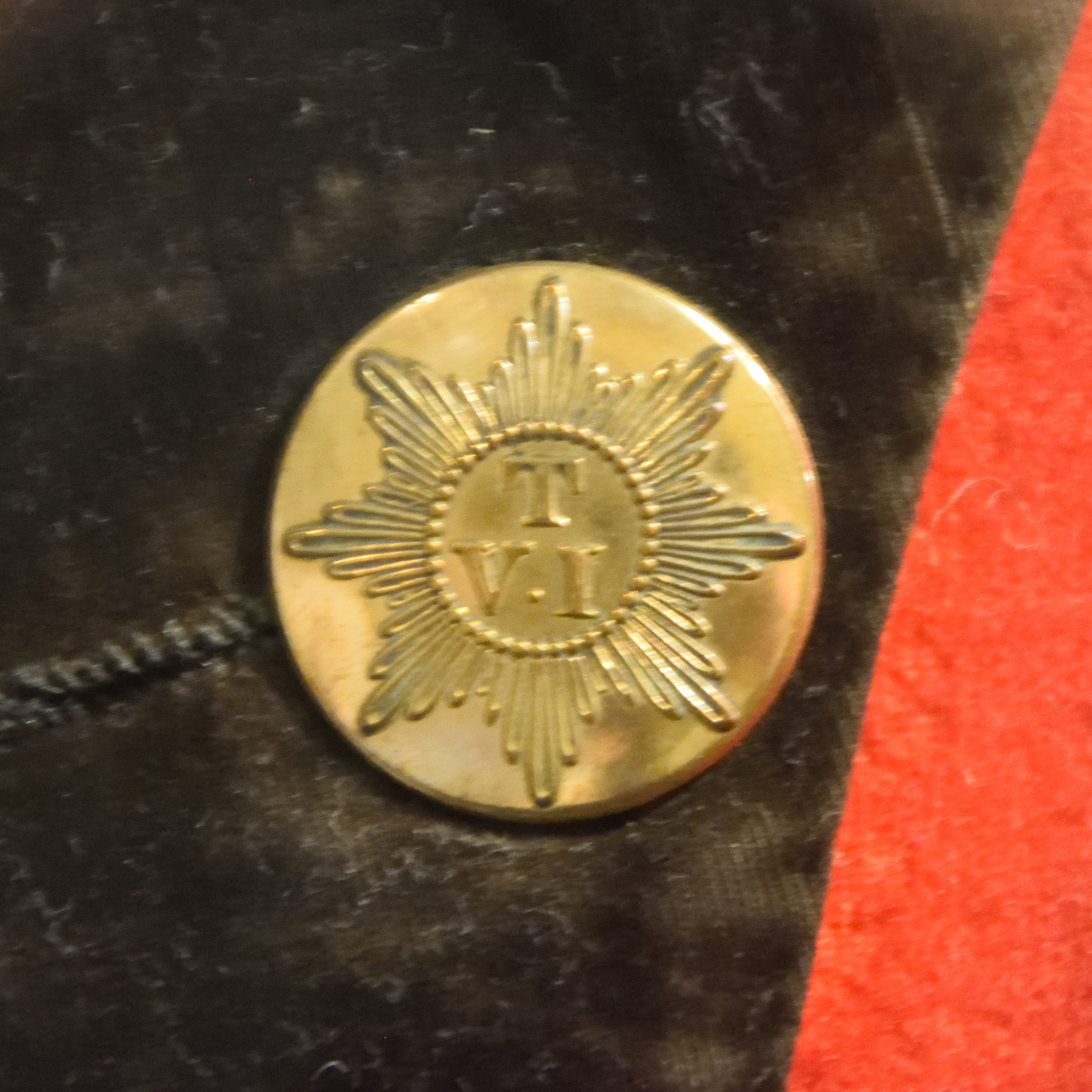
Officer's coatee button of the Teesdale Volunteer Infantry c.1800s from the Durham Light Infantry museum

Volunteer recruitment early on in the Revolutionary wars proceeded slowly, mostly in the counties most likely to face an invasion. Even with the right to avoid the militia ballot, it remained slow until boosted by the Defence of the Realm Act 1798 (38 Geo. 3. c. 27) which allowed the raising of "Armed Associations". These were again raised by local subscription, with the local gentry or a rich businessman providing the bulk of the capital who often then commanded the formation. The rank of commandant depended on the number of men in the formation, two or three score for a Captain-commandant, up to 500 for a Lt. Colonel-commandant.

The first to form was the Sunderland Loyal Volunteers in 1794 by Robert Hayton, and consisted of three companies of 100 men, many of whom were Keelmen. Disbanded in 1802 they were re-raised in 1803 and disbanded in 1812.

The large numbers of volunteers encouraged by Pitt's Defence of the Realm Act 1798 formed many small units in County Durham, as listed below:

- South Shields Volunteer Infantry (1797—1802), commanded by Major-commandant Sir Cuthbert Heron
  - re-raised 1803 as the 1st (disbanded 1813) and 2nd (1812) South Shields Volunteer Infantry
- Easington Ward Gentlemen and Yeomanry Cavalry (1798—1802), raised by Rowland Burdon
- North Durham Gentlemen and Yeomanry (1798—1810), raised by Sir Carnaby Haggerston, Bart
  - renamed in 1803 as the North Durham Troop of Volunteer Cavalry, disbanded in 1810
- Staindrop Gentlemen and Yeomanry (1798—1815), raised by John Ingram
  - renamed as the Staindrop Troop of Volunteer Cavalry, disbanded in 1815
- Usworth Gentlemen and Yeomanry Cavalry (1798—1802), raised by Thomas Wade
  - re-raised 1803 as part of the Loyal Unsworth Legion
- Sunderland Artillery Volunteers (1798—1802), commanded by Captain-commandant Thomas Scarth
  - re-raised 1803
- Hartlepool Volunteer Artillery (1798—1802), raised by Charles Spearmans as Major-commandant
  - re-raised 1803
- City of Durham Loyal Volunteers (Infantry) (1798—1802), commanded by Captain-commandant Howden Philipson Rowe
- Gateshead Volunteer Infantry (1798—1802), commanded Captain-commandant Robert Shafto Hawkes
  - re-raised 1803, disbanded in 1813
- Bishopwearmouth Independent Cavalry (Cavalry) (1798—1802)raised by John Goodchild as Captain-commandant
- The Gibside Volunteer Associated Troops of Cavalry (1799—1802) raised by John Bowes.
  - re-raised in 1804 as part of the Derwent Legion.
- Durham Light Horse Association (1798—1802), commanded by Henry Methold.
- Loyal Axwell Volunteer Association (Cavalry) (1798—1802), raised by Sir Thomas Clavering.
  - re-raised in 1803 as the Axwell Yeomanry Cavalry disbanded in 1814.
- Durham Volunteer Association (Infantry) (1798—1802), raised by John Ralph Fenwick.
  - re-raised 1804 as the Durham Volunteer Infantry, commanded by Lt. Colonel-commandant John Ralph Fenwick, disbanded in 1813.
- Stockton Volunteer Association (Infantry) (1798—1799), organised by Rowland Webster, became the Stockton Volunteer Infantry (1799—1802), commanded by Captain-commandant John Allison.
  - re-raised 1803 disbanded in 1813.
- Darlington Volunteer Infantry (1799—1802), raised and commanded by Major-commandant John Trotter.
  - re-raised 1803 as part of the Darlington Legion.

Under the threat of conscription into the militia by the Levy en masse if sufficient numbers were not raised, and the inducement of exemption from the militia ballot if a man joined a volunteer corps before 22 July, the volunteers reformed with even greater numbers in 1803. Most of the previous units were reformed, with some joining together with other new or enlarged units to form mixed infantry and cavalry "Legions".

- Darlington Legion raised in 1803 by John Trotter with and an enlarged Darlington Volunteer Infantry of six companies and two troops of cavalry.
  - split into the Darlington Volunteer Infantry and Darlington Cavalry in 1806.
- Derwent Legion (1803—1813), raised by the 10th Earl of Strathmore, and incorporating the re-raised Gibside Cavalry troop and a new infantry corps of six companies. The infantry were disbanded at the end of 1813.
- Loyal Unsworth Legion (1803—1808) raised by Thomas Wade with a squadron of four troops of the Unsworth Gentlemen and Yeomanry Cavalry and four new companies of infantry
  - split into the South Tyne Volunteer Infantry and the South Tyne Volunteer Cavalry.

Other new corps raised in 1803:

- Durham Volunteer Cavalry raised and commanded by Major-commandant Arthur Mowbray.
- Chester-le-Street Volunteer Artillery and Infantry raised by Luke Colling, three companies strong, disbanded in 1811.
- Teesdale Volunteer Infantry absorbed into the Local Militia in 1809.

=== Local Militia ===
Due to the large numbers of small Volunteer units, and the radical politics of a number of them around the country, they were encouraged to merge into larger Local Militia battalions by the gradual withdrawal of financial support.

- 1st Durham Local Militia formed in 1809 around the Darlington and Teesdale volunteers, disbanded in 1816
- 2nd Durham Local Militia formed in 1812 around the Sunderland and South Tyne volunteers, also disbanded in 1816.

=== Yeomanry ===
Towards the end of the war many of the cavalry corps merged into Yeomanry Regiments used to keep the peace. These were:

- the South Tyne Yeomanry (Usworth and Axwell cavalry)
- the Durham Yeomanry (Gibside, Staindrop and Durham cavalry)
- the Darlington Independent Yeomanry (Darlington cavalry)

Aside for training and exercising, none were called out, except for those in the North of the County in 1804 for a false alarm, and by 1818 all of the infantry, cavalry and artillery volunteers had disbanded.

=== Rifle Volunteers ===
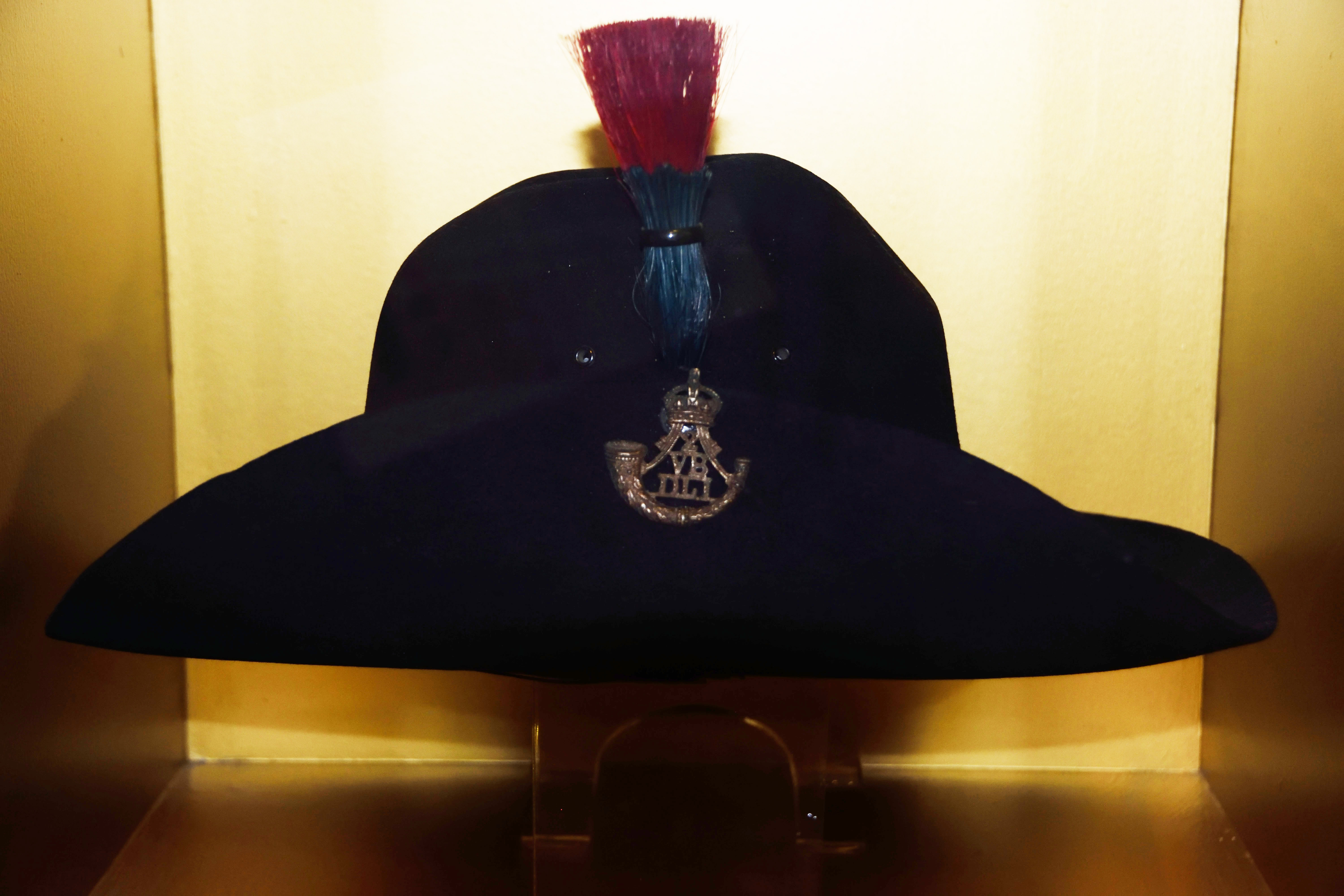
Slouch hat of the 2nd Volunteer Battalion DLI, 1904-1908 from the Durham Light Infantry museum

In another invasion scare in 1859 circulars were issued by the government based on the provisions of the Yeomanry Act 1804 (44 Geo. 3. c. 54) for the raising of corps of volunteers in the counties. As an inducement 25 Enfield rifles were to be issued by the government for every 100 volunteers, with a corps needing 60 men (effectives) to become established, and candidates for membership having to be approved by the corps committee. In addition to finding the cost of the uniform and equipment (weapon included), an average of £10, a subscription was payable:

- Effectives, 10/- (10 shillings) a year (assistance for the uniform and equipment from the general fund if required)
- Honorary members, £1 a year, found their own uniform and drilled as often as possible
- non-effective, subscriber only

The "effectives" were the backbone of the corps. As the volunteer corps were predominantly middle class, this placed them in direct competition with the non balloted militia and enticed many of the landed gentry in search of commissions away and left the militia almost the preserve of the working class. The volunteer corps, each under the title of Durham Rifle Volunteer Corps (RVC), formed in County Durham by February 1861 were:

- 1st, Stockton, formed on 27 February 1860
- 2nd, not formed
- 3rd, Sunderland, 6 March
- 4th, Bishop Auckland, 24 May
- 5th, not formed
- 6th, South Shields, 20 March
- 7th, Durham, 24 March
- 8th, Gateshead, 14 March
- 9th, Blaydon, 3 May
- 10th, Beamish, 12 May
- 11th, Chester-le-Street, 5 June
- 12th, Middleton-in-Teesdale, 14 July
- 13th, Birtley 17 August
- 14th, Felling, 31 October
- 15th, Darlington, 6 October
- 16th, Castle Eden, 14 December
- 17th, Wolsingham, 24 November
- 18th, Shotley Bridge, 1 December
- 19th, Hartlepool, 26 January 1861
- 20th, Stanhope, 19 February 1861

In August 1861 the corps were grouped (on paper) into Administrative battalions:

- 1st (7th, 10th, 11th, 13th and 14th corps) with headquarters in Durham
- 2nd (1st, 4th, 12th, 15th, 16th, 17th, 18th, 19th and 20th) with headquarters in Bishop Auckland
- 3rd (6th, 8th and 9th) with headquarters in Gateshead

The 3rd (Sunderland) Corps was large enough not to join with other corps, being five companies strong. In December the 4th Administrative Battalion was formed from the 1st, 15th, 16th and 19th corps taken from the 2nd Administrative Battalion.

In April 1862 the strength of the Durham Volunteer corps was:

- 1st Admin. battalion: 770 men in 11 companies
- 2nd Admin. battalion: 407 men in 7 companies
- 3rd Admin. battalion: 399 men in 6 companies
- 4th Admin. battalion: 419 men in 7 companies
- 3rd (Sunderland) Corps: 296 men in 5 companies

In 1863 the Lord Lieutenant of the county standardised the uniform to one of rifle green. In November, the 7th Yorkshire (North Riding) RVC at Startforth moved to Barnard Castle and was renamed as the 21st Durham RVC in the 4th (later 2nd) Admin battalion. In 1877 the 21st Yorkshire (North Riding) RVC at Middlesbrough also joined the 4th Admin Bn, without changing its designation. There was little interaction between these battalions, (Note: Occasionally little interaction within corps! The Blaydon corps' two sections, Blaydon "down hillers" and Winlaton "up hillers", had a "falling out" in 1864 after which they secured separate drill grounds.) and the individual corps did not always prosper, the 10th, 14th, 17th and 18th corps dissolving by the end of the century and new ones, not always in the same location, replacing them. The primary concern of many was solvency.

=== Reform and Amalgamation ===
After being brigaded with the militia and the regulars' depot from 1873, but still having little interaction with them, and still with each other, in 1880 the Administrative battalions were renamed:

- The 1st Administrative battalion became the 4th Durham Rifle Volunteers
- The 2nd Administrative battalion became the 2nd Durham Rifle Volunteers
- The 3rd Durham Rifle Volunteer Corps became the 3rd Durham Rifle Volunteers
- The 3rd Administrative battalion became the 6th Durham Rifle Volunteers (renumbered the 5th later in the year)
- The 4th Administrative battalion became the 1st Durham Rifle Volunteers

In 1881 with the amalgamation of the regulars, militia and volunteers into the Durham Light Infantry, the use of regular officers (occasionally from the D.L.I.) as battalion adjutant began, beginning a closer connection to the regulars of the new territorial regiment. In 1887 the Rifle Volunteers were renamed as Volunteer Battalions of the Durham Light Infantry with no change in numbering. About this time annual battalion camps became usual.

During the Boer War volunteers from the five battalions together provided four companies of 116 of all ranks, for one years service to reinforce the army in South Africa. The first three reinforced, in sequence, their regular battalion from April 1900 to July 1902, the fourth reinforced the 2nd Buffs then the 2nd Northumberland Fusiliers from March 1901 to May 1902. These attachments greatly increased the connections between the volunteers and the county regiment, and coupled with another invasion scare caused by the small numbers of regular troops left in the country, caused a surge in volunteer numbers.

=== Artillery Volunteers ===
A number of Artillery Volunteer Corps (AVCs) were also raised at the same time as the Rifle Volunteers:

- 1st, formed at Sunderland on 14 March 1860
- 2nd (Seaham), formed at Seaham Colliery on 14 March 1860
- 3rd, formed at South Shields on 14 March 1860
- 4th, formed at West Hartlepool on 14 March 1860
- 5th (Rainton), to be raised at West Rainton in 1868 but never fully formed; officers and men enlisted into 2nd (Seaham) AVC in 1869.

In 1863 the 1st Durham AVC was attached to the larger 2nd (Seaham) AVC for administrative purposes, then in 1873 to the 1st Admin Brigade of Northumberland AVCs. It regained its independence in 1888.

The 2nd (Seaham) Durham AVC had all the other Durham AVCs attached to it until 1873, when the 1st, and 3rd joined other units, the 4th becoming independent in 1886.

The 3rd Durham AVC absorbed the 6th Durham Rifle Volunteers at South Shields in 1863. After leaving the 2nd (Seaham) AVC in 1873 the 3rd was attached to the 1st Newcastle-upon-Tyne Artillery Volunteers until it regained its independence in 1890.

All the Durham Artillery Volunteers became part of the Royal Garrison Artillery (Volunteers) in 1902.

=== Engineer Volunteers ===
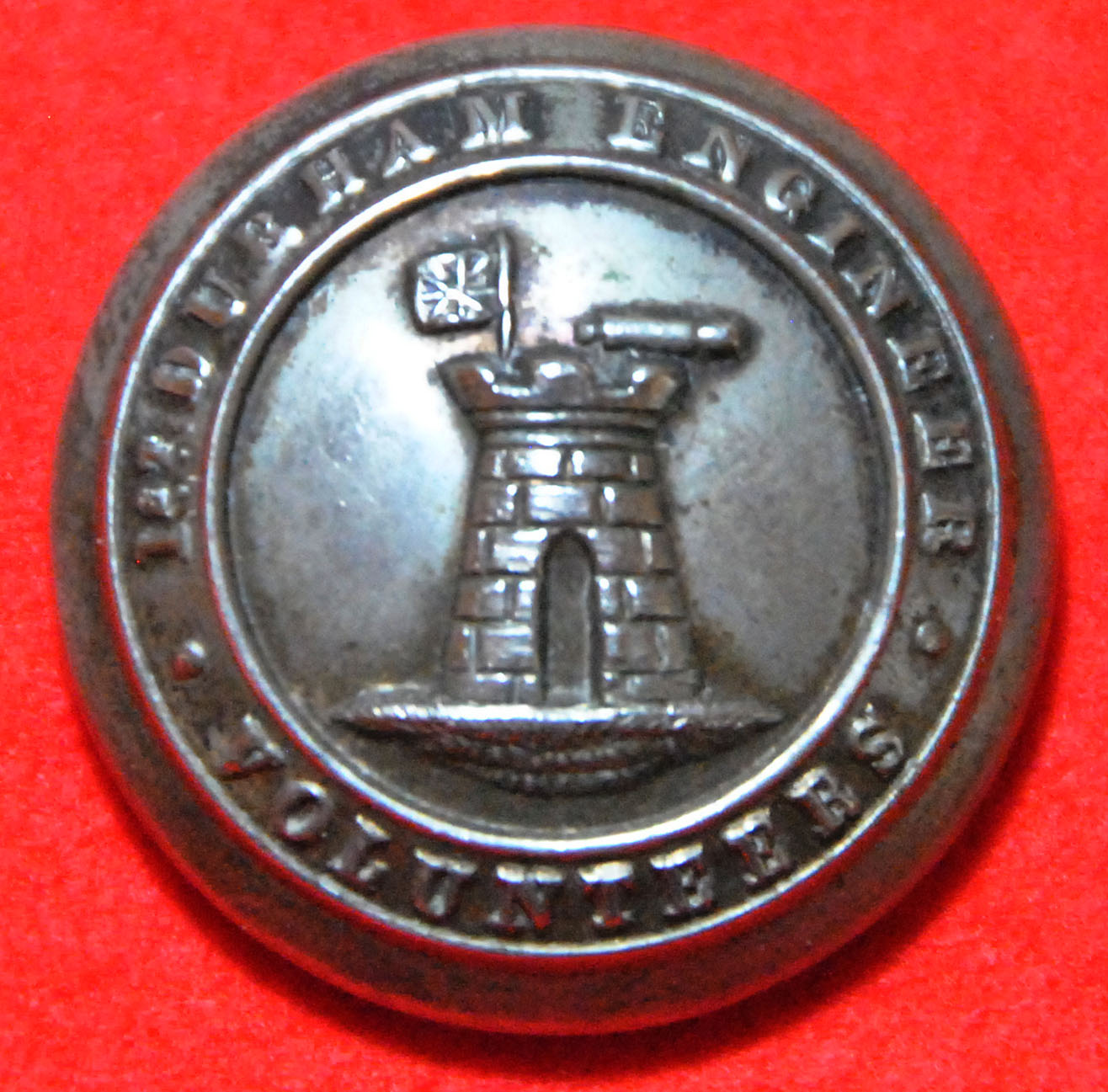
1st Durham Engineer Volunteers tunic button.

A volunteer unit of the Royal Engineers was also raised:

- 1st Durham EVC, formed at Jarrow on 28 March 1868.

In 1869 the smaller 1st Newcastle upon Tyne EVC was attached to the unit, and from 1874 they were united in the 1st Admin Battalion, Durham Engineer Volunteers (later 1st Newcastle & Durham). In 1888 the battalion was split into three separate units: the 1st Durham RE (Volunteers), at Jarrow, the Tyne Division RE (V), Submarine Miners and the 1st Newcastle-on-Tyne RE (V).

The 1st Durham RE (V) sent a detachment of one officer and 25 other ranks to assist the regular REs during the Second Boer War in 1900, and a second section the following year.

=== Haldane Reforms ===
As part of the reforms to the volunteers (the same Territorial and Reserve Forces Act 1907 that affected the militia), and in return for increased financial support on an often heavy burden for the commanding officer, the volunteer would undertake a regular annual camp and a training obligation of six months if mobilised, with the volunteer battalions coming under the control of the newly formed county association. As the reforms were announced and debated in the prelude to the formation of the Territorial Force there was a fall in numbers joining the volunteers.

On 31 March 1908 the Volunteer Force was dissolved and the next day the Territorial Force put in place with the volunteer battalions under the control of the county associations. The volunteer battalions were renumbered, in sequence after the old militia battalions: in County Durham as the 5th to 9th Battalions of the Durham Light Infantry. They were formed into part of the Northumbrian Division, with the 5th battalion in the York and Durham Brigade and the remainder comprising the Durham Light Infantry Brigade. (Note: The division and brigades would not be numbered until May 1915, receiving higher numbers than the more recently formed New Army formations.)

== Bibliography ==
- Beckett, Ian F.W., Riflemen Form: A Study of the Rifle Volunteer Movement 1859–1908, Aldershot: Ogilby Trusts, 1982, ISBN 0 85936 271 X.
- Beckett, Ian F W (2011). Britain's Part Time Soldiers. The Amateur Military Tradition 1558—1945 (2 ed.). Barnsley: Pen & Sword. ISBN 9781848843950.
- Clive Dunn, The Fighting Pioneers: the Story of the 7th Durham Light Infantry, Barnsley: Pen & Sword, 2015, ISBN 978-1-47382-348-8.
- Knight, Roger (2014). Britain Against Napoleon. The Organization of Victory 1793—1815 (1 ed.). London: Penguin Books. ISBN 9780141038940.
- Litchfield, Norman E.H., The Militia Artillery 1852–1909 (Their Lineage, Uniforms and Badges), Nottingham: Sherwood Press, 1987, ISBN 0-9508205-1-2.
- Litchfield, Norman & Westlake, Ray, The Volunteer Artillery 1859–1908 (Their Lineage, Uniforms and Badges), Nottingham: Sherwood Press, 1982, ISBN 0-9508205-0-4.
- Vane W L 1914 (2009) The Durham Light Infantry. The United Red and White Rose Naval and Military Press ISBN 978-1-84574-146-4
- Ward, S G P (2005) [1962]. Faithful. The Story of the Durham Light Infantry. Naval and Military Press. ISBN 978-1-84574-147-1.
- Watson, Col Sir Charles M., History of the Corps of Royal Engineers, Vol III, Chatham: Institution of Royal Engineers, reprint 1954.
- Westlake, R.A., Royal Engineers (Volunteers) 1859–1908, Wembley: R.A. Westlake, 1983, ISBN 0-9508530-0-3.
- Westlake, R.A., Tracing the Rifle Volunteers, Barnsley: Pen and Sword, 2010, ISBN 978-1-84884-211-3.
- Wyrall, Everard (1939). The Fiftheth Division 1914—1919 (1 ed.). Uckfield: The Naval and Military Press. ISBN 9781843422068.
