= James Clavering (disambiguation) =

James Clavering, 1st Baronet (1620–1702).

James Clavering may also refer to:

- Sir James Clavering, 2nd Baronet (1668–1707), High Sheriff of Northumberland; of the Clavering baronets
- Sir James Clavering, 4th Baronet, (1708–1726) of the Clavering baronets
- Sir James Clavering, 6th Baronet, (1680–1748) of the Clavering baronets, candidate for Newcastle (UK Parliament constituency)

== See also ==
- Clavering (surname)
