= Henry Clavering =

Henry Clavering may refer to:

- Sir Henry Clavering, 10th Baronet of the Clavering baronets
- Henry Clavering, fictional character in The Claverings
- Henry R. Clavering, fictional character in The Leavenworth Case

== See also ==
- Clavering (surname)
