= Sir James Clavering, 1st Baronet =

English landowner (1620–1702)

Sir James Clavering, 1st Baronet (3 February 1620 – 24 March 1702) was an English landowner.

He was the grandson of James Clavering (1565–1630), a merchant adventurer, Mayor of Newcastle upon Tyne in 1607, who bought an estate at Axwell House, near Blaydon on Tyne in 1629. Educated at Magdalene College, Cambridge and Gray's Inn, Sir James inherited the Axwell estate on the death of his father in 1648.

He served as High Sheriff of Durham in 1649, as MP for Durham 1656–1658 during the Parliaments of the Protectorate and as Mayor of Newcastle in 1663. Clavering was created a baronet on 5 June 1661.

His son John took part in the Jacobite rising of 1715 and was imprisoned in the Fleet prison in London.

The granddaughter of his brother Robert Clavering (1625–1675) (who had married the heiress to the estate at Chopwell Hall, Chopwell, Co Durham) married William Cowper, 1st Earl Cowper in 1706. Their son William changed his name to Clavering-Cowper on inheriting Chopwell from his uncle.

Clavering married Jane Maddison in 1640. Three grandsons in turn succeeded to the Baronetcy; James, John, and Francis.

Baronetage of England
New title	Baronet (of Axwell); 1661–1702	Succeeded by James Clavering
