= John Clavering =

John Clavering is the name of:

- John Clavering (c. 1364–1425), MP for Northumberland (UK Parliament constituency)
- John Clavering (died 1762) (1698–1762), Member of Parliament for Great Marlow, and for Penryn
- John Clavering (British Army officer) (died 1777), army officer and diplomat
- Sir John Clavering, 3rd Baronet (1672–1714), of the Clavering baronets

== See also ==
- Clavering (surname)
