= Ottovale coke works =

Industrial complex

- Location in Tyne and Wear
- 54.96°N 1.72°W
- Location: Tyne and Wear, England, UK

Ottovale coke works was a large industrial complex situated at Blaydon Burn, near Blaydon-on-Tyne, Gateshead, North East England. The complex comprised a coke works, tar works and a power station. Built on the site of Dockendale Hall in 1904, it was operated by the Priestman Collieries until the 1970s.

The power station at the plant, known as Blaydon Burn Power Station or the Priestman Power Station was fuelled by waste heat from the coking process. In the 1910s, a number of advancements in steam turbine technology were first implemented at the station.

== History ==
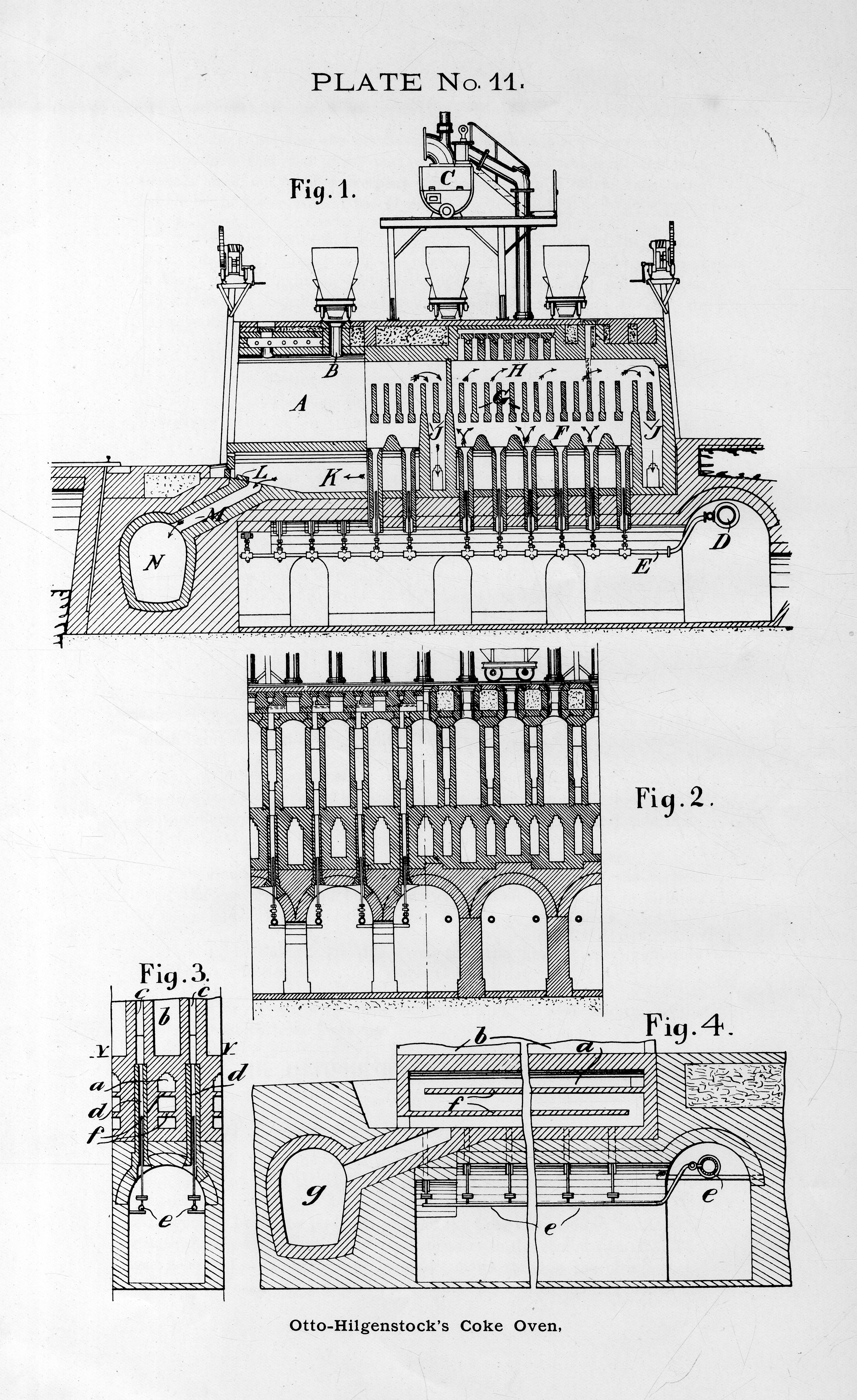
Otto - Hilgenstock Coke Oven drawing

In 1853 a shaft was sunk for the Blaydon Main coal seam at Blaydon Burn, and in 1902 a coke works was set up on the site of the nearby Dockendale Hall. This was operated by the Priestman Power Company, producing coke using 80 coke ovens, made by the Otto-Hilgenstock company of Germany.

By the 1950s, 90 ovens were operating at the plant. In 1958, one battery, equating to about half of the plant's ovens, were shut down along with ovens at Shotton Colliery and Whinfield coke works. This affected the employment of 150 men, as many of whom the National Coal Board and the union tried to find alternative employment for. The closures were due to a reorganisation of the industry by the board. At this point the works at Ottovale were one of the oldest coking plants in the Durham coalfield.

== Power station ==
Blaydon Burn Power Station (Priestman Power Station)
- Country: England
- Location: Tyne and Wear, North East England
- Commission date: 1904
- Decommission date: 1959
- Operators: Priestman Power Company (1904–1914); Newcastle upon Tyne Electric Supply Company (1914–1948); British Electricity Authority (1948–1955); Central Electricity Authority (1955–1957); Central Electricity Generating Board (1957–1959)

Thermal power station
- Primary fuel: Waste heat

The power station was constructed in 1904 to use waste heat produced by the coke ovens. The heat was piped from the coke ovens to under four land-type Babcock & Wilcox boilers, each with 500 HP capacity. The boilers supplied steam for two 275 kilowatt (kW) Parsons three phase turbo alternators. At the time of opening, this generating equipment was of the latest and best design. The alternators produced 6,000 volts. The electricity generated by the station was initially used as a power supply for the coal mine, but the Priestman Power Company was bought by the Newcastle-upon-Tyne Electric Supply Company in 1914, meaning the electricity was also used to power the rest of the county, using the County Durham distribution system.

Feed water for the boilers was taken from the Blaydon Burn, upon which the station was built. However, there wasn't a sufficient amount of water available for condensing purposes as well, and so the condensing water needed to be used over and over again. This necessitated the construction of a cooling tower and reservoir.

The station's boiler house and turbine hall were of a steel framed construction, with corrugated iron cladding. The advantage of this type of construction is that if the coke ovens were to be abandoned, the station could be deconstructed and re-erected somewhere else at a minimal cost.

In 1916, the station's generating equipment was replaced by a 3,000 kW Parsons generating set. This was the first generating set in the world to use reheated steam between stages in its turbines, and to progressively heat feed-water using partially expanded steam. In 1919 the station was further modified, becoming the first station in the world to use an enclosed ventilating circuit for the alternator with a gilled-tube cooler for extracting the heat from the ventilating air, which overcame problems caused by dust and moisture getting into the windings. When the UK's national grid distribution system was brought into use in 1932, the station was one of a small number of stations in the region to be converted from the 40 hertz (Hz) frequency used by the North Eastern grid system to the 50 Hz frequency used by the national system. The station ceased operating in 1959. Reclamation of the coke works began in the 1970s and the area has now been returned to grassland. An electrical substation still stands near the site.
