= William Clavering =

William Clavering may refer to:

- William Clavering-Cowper, 2nd Earl Cowper
- Sir William Clavering, 9th Baronet, High Sheriff of Durham

== See also ==
- Clavering (surname)
