= Path Head Watermill =

Coordinates: 54.965°N 1.731°W

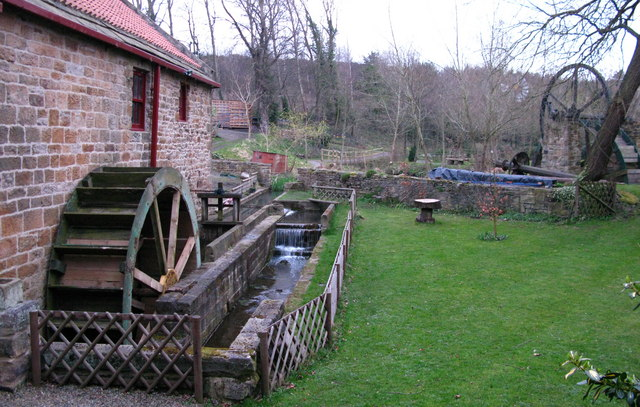
Path Head Watermill, March 2009

Path Head Mill is an 18th-century watermill at Summerhill on Blaydon Burn, between Blaydon and Stella, near Gateshead in north-east England. The Vale Mill Trust has been restoring the site to include a water-powered joiners' workshop and a visitor centre since 1994/1995.
