= Sir John Eden, 4th Baronet =

British politician (1740–1812)

Sir John Eden Bt MP
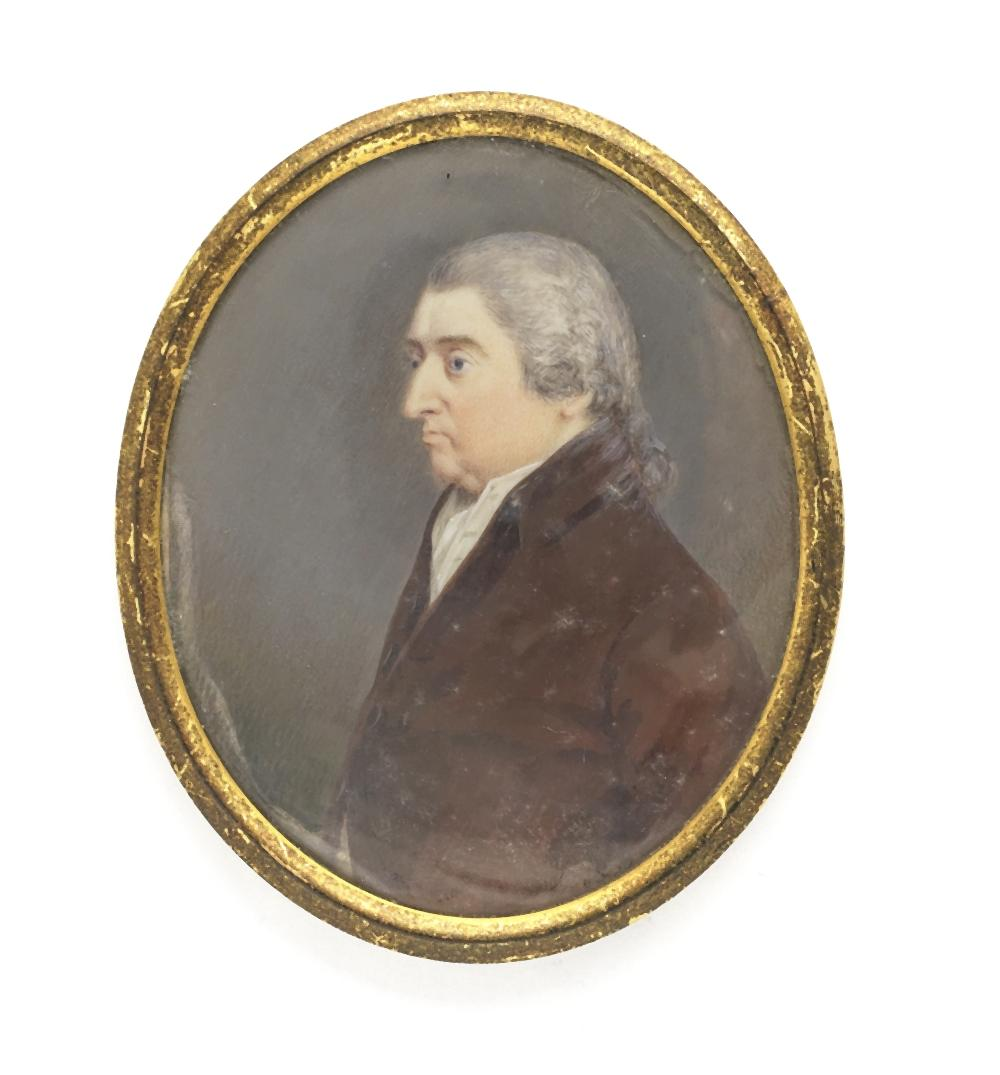

Member of Parliament for Durham County
- In office 1774–1790

4th Baronet
- In office 1755–1812
- Preceded by: Robert Eden
- Succeeded by: Robert Johnson-Eden

Mayor of Hartlepool
- In office 1775-1776; 1787-1788
- Preceded by: John Greveson
- Succeeded by: Jonathan Davison

Personal details
- Born: 16 September 1740
- Died: 23 August 1812 (aged 71)
- Resting place: St. Helen's Churchyard
- Spouse(s): Catherine Thompson (m. 1764; died 1766) Dorothea Johnson (m. 1767)
- Children: 10
- Parent(s): Sir Robert Eden, 3rd Baronet; Mary Davison
- Relatives: William Eden, 1st Baron Auckland (Brother); Anthony Eden (Great-Great-Great-Nephew)
- Education: Trinity College, Cambridge

Sir John Eden, 4th Baronet MP (16 September 1740 – 23 August 1812), was a British politician who sat in the House of Commons between 1774 and 1790.

Eden was the eldest son of Sir Robert Eden, 3rd Baronet and his wife Mary Davison of Beamish, County Durham, and was born on 16 September 1740. He succeeded his father in the baronetcy on 25 June 1755. He was educated at Eton College from 1755 to 1758 and at Trinity College, Cambridge in 1759. He married firstly Catherine Thompson daughter of John Thompson of Kirby Hall, Yorkshire on 26 June 1764. She died in March 1766. Secondly he married Dorothea Johnson, of York on 9 April 1767. They had 10 children.

In 1774 he was returned unopposed as Member of Parliament for Durham County and was a supporter of Lord North's administration. He was returned again in 1780 although it was said of him shortly after that 'He holds the business of the House in great contempt, generally comes down after dinner, and is always the first to call for the question.' He was re-elected in 1784 and at the time of the Regency crisis in 1788 complained of being recalled to parliament. There is no record of his ever having spoken in the House and appeared to prefer hunting to spending time at parliament. In 1789 he became anxious about his seat citing the threat of "an alien banker". His younger brother William Eden, 1st Baron Auckland, also reportedly opposed his run in 1790, and Eden was defeated in the general election. Eden was also twice Mayor of Hartlepool, in 1775 and in 1786.

Eden died on 23 August 1812. Following his death, he was buried in St. Helen's Church, Durham on the 29th August 1812.

== Sources ==
- Kidd, Charles, Williamson, David (editors). Debrett's Peerage and Baronetage (1990 edition). New York: St Martin's Press, 1990.
- Leigh Rayment's list of baronets

Parliament of Great Britain
Preceded by Sir Thomas Clavering, 7th Baronet; Frederick Vane	Member of Parliament for Durham County; 1774–1790; With: Sir Thomas Clavering, 7th Baronet 1774-1790	Succeeded by Rowland Burdon; Captain Ralph Milbanke
Baronetage of England
Preceded by Robert Eden	Baronet (of West Auckland); 1755–1812	Succeeded by Robert Johnson-Eden
