= Stella, Gateshead =

Coordinates: 54.97°N 1.73°W

Stella
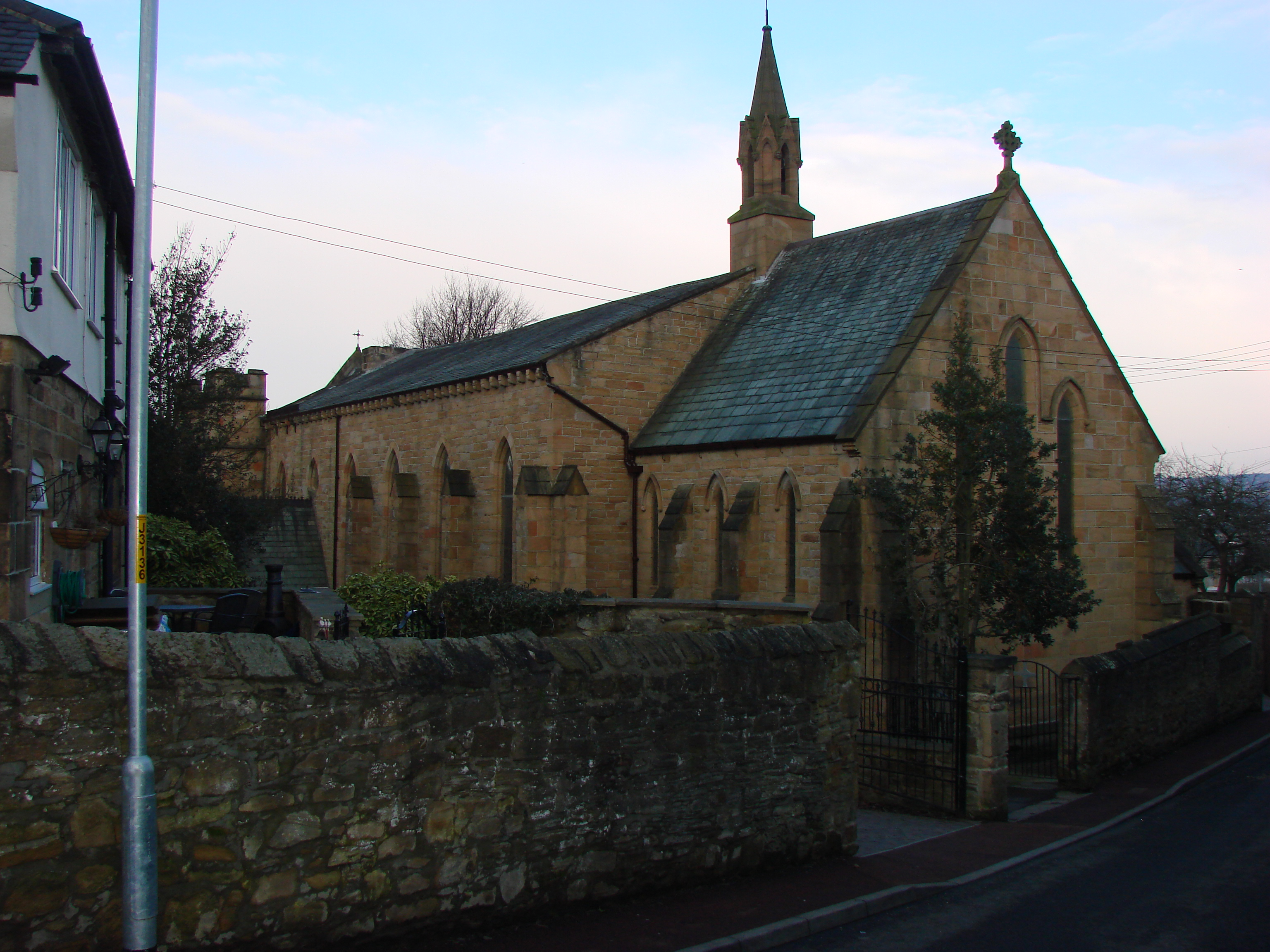
- Church of St Mary St Thomas Aquina

- Location within Tyne and Wear
- OS grid reference: NZ171644
- Metropolitan borough: Gateshead
- Metropolitan county: Tyne and Wear
- Region: North East
- Country: England
- Sovereign state: United Kingdom
- Post town: BLAYDON-ON-TYNE
- Postcode district: NE21
- Dialling code: 0191
- Police: Northumbria
- Fire: Tyne and Wear
- Ambulance: North East
- UK Parliament: Blaydon

Stella is a community in the Metropolitan Borough of Gateshead, Tyne and Wear, England. It lies on the south bank of the Tyne, about 5 miles (8 km) west of central Newcastle upon Tyne, between Blaydon (to the south-east) and Ryton (to the west). The area includes the Stella Park housing estate, built on the grounds of a mansion of the same name.

== History ==
In the 12th century the Bishop of Durham, William of St. Barbara, granted Stellinglei to the nuns of Newcastle, and it remained the property of the nunnery until the dissolution of the monasteries under Henry VIII. Around 1600 the land was granted to the Tempest family, who built a mansion called Stella Hall, overlooking the river.

In the 1840s there was a coal pit, and there were makers of coal wagons, railway rolling stock and fire bricks. The Addison mine was opened at Stella in 1864, and in 1894 coal was processed in 180 coke ovens on the site. The Stella Coal Company owned several more mines in the neighbouring Ryton and Blaydon areas. Mining continued into the 20th century; the Stella Coal Company Ltd entered voluntary liquidation in 1954 and the final seams in the area were abandoned in 1963.

William Burn's book (1896) describes Stella thus: "It is straggling in appearance, and several of the houses are old and thatched. Nearly the whole of the land is in the possession of the Townley family."

There is an 18th-century watermill at Path Head, on the Stella bank of the Blaydon Burn, which was restored in the late 20th century as a visitor attraction.

The Roman Catholic church of St Mary and St Thomas Aquinas, with adjoining presbytery, was built in 1831–1832 to designs of John Green and enlarged in 1848–1849 to designs of John Dobson. For the Church of England, a district was created in 1845 from parts of Ryton and Winlaton parishes, those parishes being said to have a large population. In the same year a church dedicated to St Cuthbert was completed in the south-east of the district, to which was added a chancel in 1862 and a tower in 1869. Today the church is within the Blaydon built-up area and its parish takes in all of Blaydon.

== Governance ==
Stella was anciently a township in Ryton parish within County Durham, and was made a separate civil parish in 1866. The Blaydon Burn was the eastern boundary of the parish, separating Stella from Winlaton parish (which at that time included a small settlement at Blaydon).

When Blaydon Urban District was created in 1894, its area included Stella. The parish was abolished on 1 April 1937 as part of the formation of Blaydon parish; the population of Stella parish had been 642 in 1931. Changes to local government in 1974 saw Blaydon parish and urban district abolished and replaced by an unparished area, at first within Tyne and Wear, then from 1986 within the Metropolitan Borough of Gateshead.

Stella is part of Ryton, Crookhill and Stella ward, which elects three members of Gateshead Council. For national government elections it is part of Blaydon constituency.

== Stella Hall ==
In 1640 during the Battle of Newburn Ford, Lord Conway had his headquarters at Stella Hall.

In the early 18th century, Jane Tempest married William Widdrington, 4th Baron Widdrington, who had the south front largely remodelled. In 1792, it was inherited by John Towneley, whose mother was Mary, daughter of the 3rd Baron Widdrington. Its descent then followed that of the main Towneley Park estate near Burnley, Lancashire, to John's son Peregrine Towneley, and was recorded as a property of 281 acres belonging to him in 1848. Members of the Towneley family were involved in coal mining: the Emma and Stargate collieries, east of Stella, carried their name and the Towneley seam lay at a depth of 315 feet (96 m).

The Hall was later the home of the industrialist and MP Joseph Cowen, and is believed to have been purchased by his father, the newspaper and coal millionaire Sir Joseph Cowen, around 1850. However, in 1878, on the death of Peregrine's son, also called John Towneley, 2,826 acres, probably formerly part of this estate, was distributed between his daughters.

The Hall remained in the Cowen family until its last member's death, Jane Cowen, in 1948. It was briefly owned by the University of Durham before the house and grounds were sold to a speculative housebuilder; the house was demolished in 1955. The only remaining part of the Hall is now known as the Grade II-listed Stella Hall Cottage: a two-storey former gardener's cottage from the late 18th century, on Stella Road near Widdrington Terrace.

== See also ==
- Stella power stations
