= Sir Thomas Clavering, 7th Baronet =

British landowner and Member of Parliament

Sir Thomas Clavering, 7th Baronet (19 June 1719 – 14 October 1794) was a British landowner and Member of Parliament.

He was the son of Sir James Clavering, 6th Baronet and succeeded to the Baronetcy of Axwell and to the family estates on the death of his father in 1748.

He was Member of Parliament for St Mawes 1753–1754, and for Shaftesbury 1754–60 (where he paid £2000 to secure the seat). He resigned his seat at Shaftesbury in December 1760 to fight a by-election for County Durham; he lost that election and the general election of 1761, but was elected for the constituency at the third attempt in 1768 and continued to represent it until 1790.

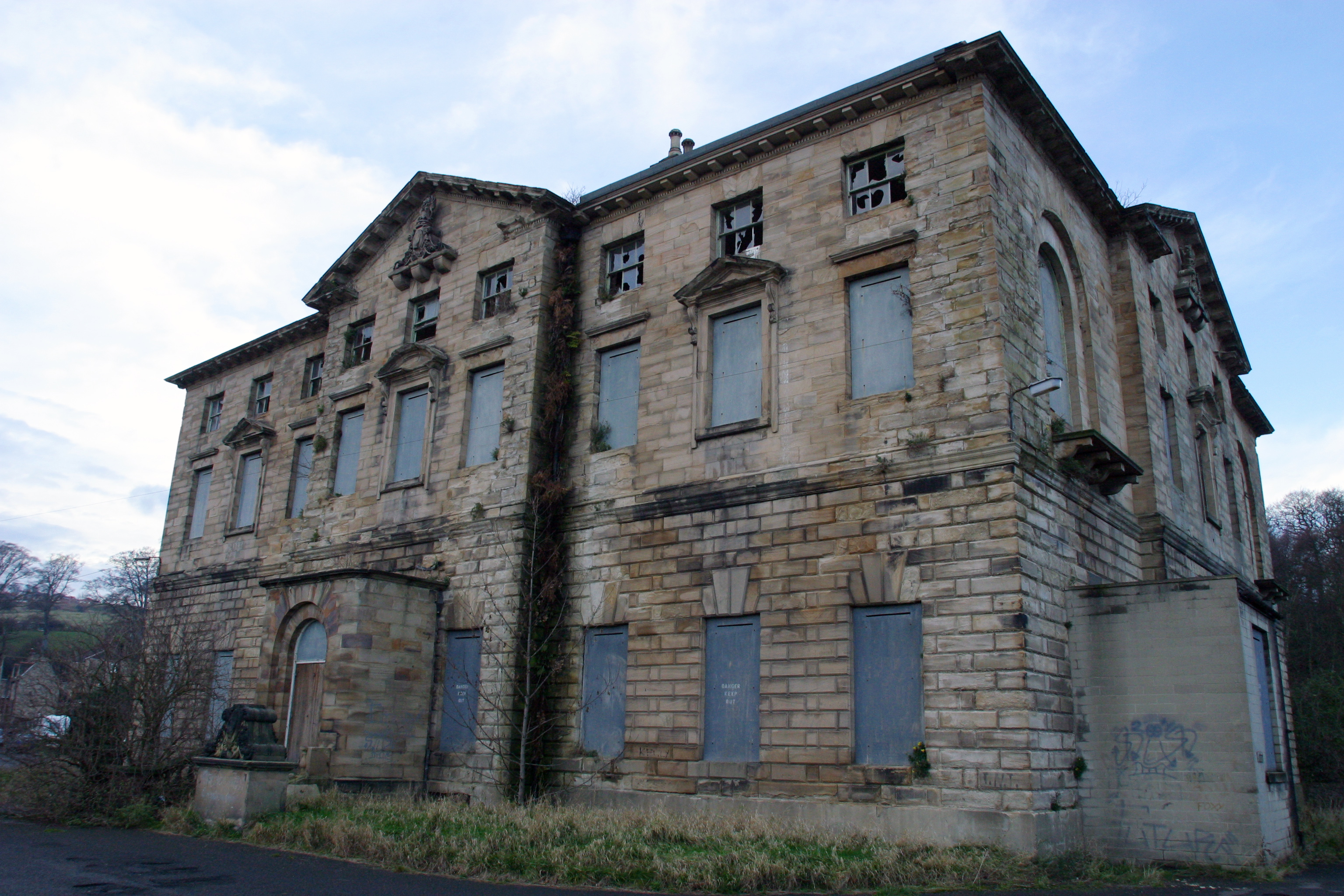
Axwell House, derelict in 2003

Prior to his succession he lived at Greencroft Hall, Greencroft, Durham, a spacious mansion built by his grandfather James Clavering (1647–1721) in the late 17th century. In 1758, he replaced his father's old house Axwell House, near Blaydon on Tyne, with a new mansion house in Palladian style.

He had substantial mining interests including collieries at Beckley and Andrews House which between 1726 and 1747 were leased out to the Grand Allies partnership.

His marriage was childless and he was succeeded by his nephew, the future Sir Thomas Clavering, 8th Baronet (son of his brother George Clavering (1719–1794) of Greencroft).

Another brother was Lieutenant General Sir John Clavering (1722–1777) who was Commander-in-Chief, India 1774–1777.

Parliament of Great Britain
Preceded by Robert Craggs-Nugent; The Lord Sundon	Member of Parliament for St Mawes; 1753–1754; With: Robert Craggs-Nugent	Succeeded by Robert Craggs-Nugent; Henry Seymour Conway
Preceded by Cuthbert Ellison; William Beckford	Member of Parliament for Shaftesbury; 1754–1760; With: James Brudenell	Succeeded by Sir Gilbert Heathcoate, Bt; Samuel Touchet
Preceded by Robert Shafto; Frederick Vane	Member of Parliament for County Durham; 1768–1790; With: Frederick Vane 1768–1774; Sir John Eden, Bt 1774–1790	Succeeded by Rowland Burdon; Sir Ralph Milbanke, Bt
Baronetage of England
Preceded by James Clavering	Baronet (of Axwell); 1768–1794	Succeeded by Thomas Clavering
