= Whinfield coke works =

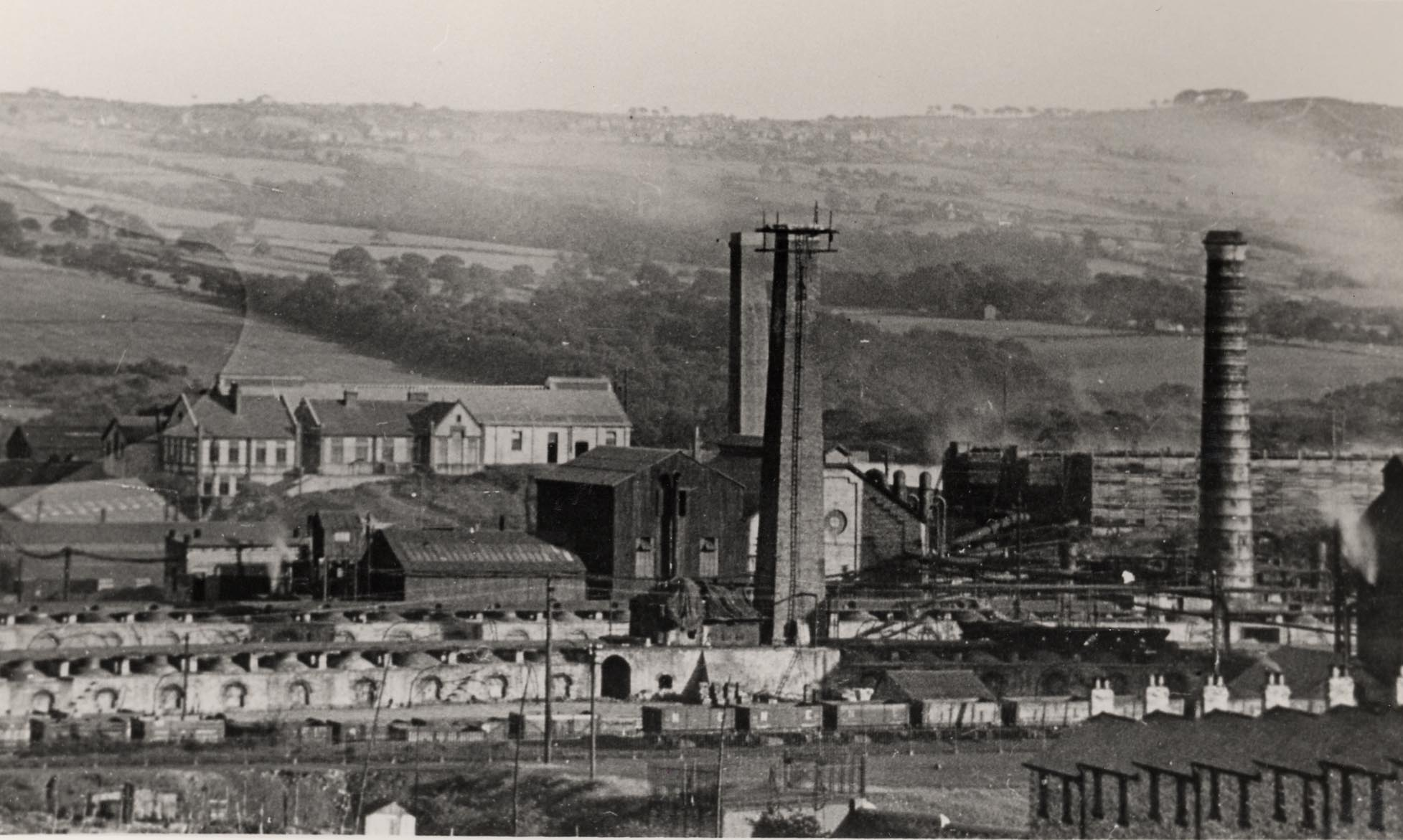
- Whinfield coke works, alloy factory and power station

- Location in Tyne and Wear
- 54.917°N 1.76°W
- Location: Tyne and Wear, England, UK

Whinfield coke works was a large industrial complex located near Rowlands Gill in Tyne and Wear, North East England. The complex comprised a coking plant, alloy factory and power station. Waste heat from the plant provided heat for a power station. This was later converted to generate electricity by burning coke.

== Alloy factory ==
An alloy factory was opened in 1909 and was operated by the Newcastle Alloy Company, producing ferro alloys such as ferrosilicon, ferromolybdenum, ferrotungsten and ferrochrome. Because ferrochrome was an important ingredient in the manufacture of armoured steel, and Whinfield was the only manufacturer of this alloy in England, the factory was extended during World War I.

At the end of World War I the demand for the alloy quickly vanished and the Newcastle Alloy Company went into liquidation in 1922 and the factory closed.

== Power station ==
Whinfield Power Station
- Official name: Whinfield Power Station
- Country: United Kingdom
- Location: Tyne and Wear, North East England
- Status: Demolished
- Commission date: 1896
- Decommission date: 1932
- Operator: Newcastle-upon-Tyne Electric Supply Company

Thermal power station
- Primary fuel: Waste heat
- Secondary fuel: Coke

External links
- Commons: Related media on Commons

The station was built in 1896 to utilise waste heat from the coke works. The waste heat was used to make steam which powered generators and produced electricity. Initially the electricity powered the Victoria Garesfield Colliery and lit the coke works. In 1902 the station began providing electricity to light the villages of Victoria Garesfield, Highfield, Barlow and Rowlands Gill.

The station had further surplus electricity, which was used in an alloy factory adjacent to the coke works. A new alloy factory was built and the power station was also extended with the building of a new station in 1914. This station used Babcock & Wilcox boilers, which burned coke instead of just using waste heat from the works. Its generating capacity was larger than that of the Dunston A power station. As demand increased, electric supplies were supplemented with the laying of a cable from Dunston power station to Whinfield in 1917.

Following the closure of the alloy factory after World War I, the power station's surplus electricity was sold to the Newcastle-upon-Tyne Electric Supply Company to supply Tyneside, exported using the cable from Dunston. The station closed in 1932 with the introduction of the national grid. It operated on a 50 hertz (Hz) frequency, and it would have proven uneconomical to convert Whinfield from its 40 Hz frequency, and so it closed down. The station's main structure was still standing in the late 1970s, but has since been demolished.

== Present ==
Whinfield Industrial Estate has since been built on the site.

== See also ==
- Coking plant
