= Sunderland Loyal Volunteers =

Unit of the British Volunteer Corps

The Sunderland Loyal Volunteers was a volunteer corps associated with the city (then a town) of Sunderland in North East England. In existence between 1794 and 1802 and again from 1803 to 1812, it manned batteries at the mouth of the River Wear during the Napoleonic Wars.
