= Axwell House =

Listed mansion house in Tyne and Wear, England

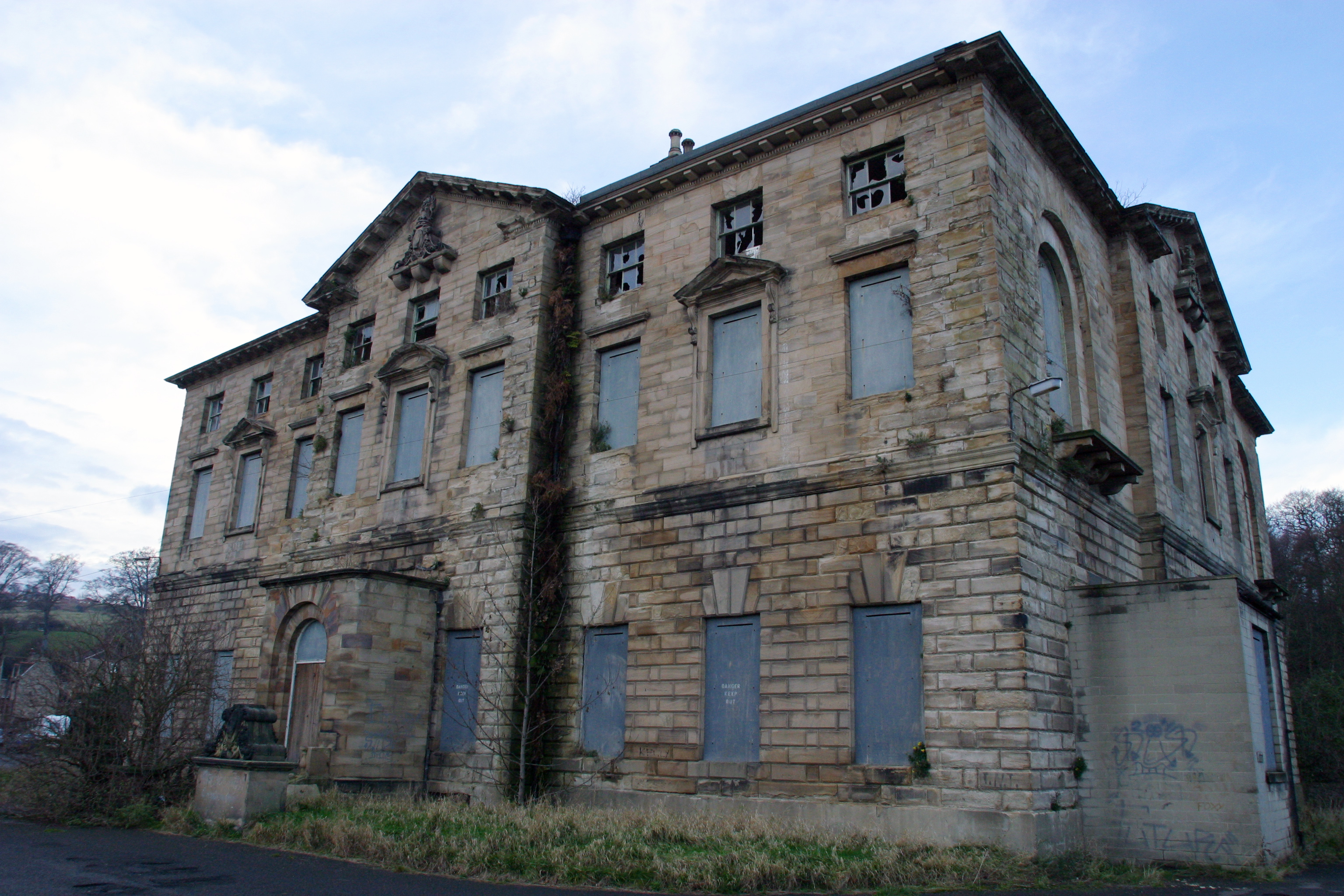
- Axwell Hall in 2003

- Location within Tyne and Wear

General information
- Architectural style: Palladian
- Location: Blaydon, Tyne and Wear, England
- Coordinates: 54°57′10″N 1°42′11″W
- Year built: 1758
- Renovated: 1817–18 (altered)
- Owner: Clavering baronets (until 1920)

Design and construction
- Architect: James Paine

Listed Building – Grade II*
- Official name: Axwell Park and steps and balustrades to south
- Designated: 18 November 1985
- Reference no.: 1025206

Axwell House (also Axwell Hall or Axwell Park) is a mansion house and Grade II* listed building, at Axwell Park, Blaydon, Tyne and Wear, England.

The house and surrounding estate were constructed in 1758 and owned by the Clavering baronets until 1920. The house became a school, but fell into disrepair in the 1980s. Houses have been built on the former stables and walled garden, and in 2020 there were plans to convert the house into apartments.

== History ==
An early manor house on the site was acquired by James Clavering, a merchant adventurer of Newcastle upon Tyne in 1629 for £1,700. In 1758 his descendant Sir Thomas Clavering of the Clavering baronets replaced the house with a substantial mansion and assisted architect James Paine (1712–89) in the Palladian design of the new house. The grounds were laid out in the style of Capability Brown. Alterations were around 1818 by John Dobson.

The hall and its surrounding 60 acres (24 ha) was converted for use as the Newcastle Ragged School in 1920. It was initially an Industrial School and then an Approved school. It had spaces for 153 children and closed in 1981.

Having stood empty, neglected and deteriorating the property and 35-acre (14 ha) park were acquired in 2005 by property developers Eight Property Ltd, for restoration and conversion to residential use. The company built 27 apartments and houses on the site of the stable block but conversion of the house was not achieved. In 2020 plans were approved for another developer to convert the house – described as an empty shell – into apartments.

== Architecture ==
The three-storey stone building has a slate roof. The south front has a three-bay with a pediment. It was designated as a Grade II* listed building in 1985.

Some of the walls and balustrades are also listed, as is the late 18th or early 19th-century sandstone bridge 280 metres (920 ft) south of the house.

The attached farm has a late 18th or early 19th-century dovecote. The grounds also included a dairy, walled kitchen garden and stables.

== See also ==
- Grade II* listed buildings in Tyne and Wear
