= Clavering baronets =

Extinct baronetcy in the Baronetage of England

The Baronetcy of Clavering of Axwell was created in the Baronetage of England on 5 June 1661 for James Clavering, the grandson of James Clavering (1565–1630), a merchant adventurer of Newcastle upon Tyne, who was mayor of that city and who bought the estate of Axwell Park, near Blaydon, Northumberland in 1629.

The Clavering family descended from the 13th-century Lords of Clavering and Warkworth and from Alan de Clavering (died 1328) of Callaly Castle, Northumberland. Branches of the family include Axwell, Callaly, Duddo, Berrington and Chopwell. The marriage of Mary Clavering of Chopwell to William Cowper in 1706 led to the creation of the Clavering-Cowper family

== Clavering of Axwell (1616) ==
Escutcheon of the Clavering baronets of Axwell

- Sir James Clavering, 1st Baronet (1620–1702)
- Sir James Clavering, 2nd Baronet (1668–1707), grandson of the 1st Baronet and High Sheriff of Northumberland in 1703
- Sir John Clavering, 3rd Baronet (1672–1714)
- Sir James Clavering, 4th Baronet (1708–1726)
- Sir Francis Clavering, 5th Baronet (1673–1738)
- Sir James Clavering, 6th Baronet (1680–1748)
- Sir Thomas Clavering, 7th Baronet (1719–1794)
- Sir Thomas John Clavering, 8th Baronet (1771–1853), nephew of the 7th Baronet, High Sheriff of Northumberland in 1817
- Sir William Aloysius Clavering, 9th Baronet (1800–1872), High Sheriff of Durham 1859
- Sir Henry Augustus Clavering, 10th Baronet (1824–1893)
- Extinct on his death

== Other Claverings ==
- John Clavering (1698–1762)
- Lt-Gen Sir John Clavering (1722–1777)
- Douglas Clavering (1794–1827)

Fictional baronets of this name appear in Pendennis (1848–50) by William Makepeace Thackeray and The Claverings (1866–7) by Anthony Trollope.
