= Clavering =

Clavering may refer to:

== Places ==
- Clavering, Essex, a village in England
- Clavering, Ontario, a community in Georgian Bluffs, Ontario, Canada
- Clavering hundred, a hundred comprising settlements in Essex and Norfolk in England
- Clavering Island, an island in the Atlantic Ocean, part of Greenland

== People with the surname ==
- Alan Napier (born Alan Napier-Clavering, 1903), British character actor
- John Clavering (disambiguation)

== People with the given name ==
- Clavering Fison (1892-1985), English businessman and politician

== See also ==
- The Claverings, a novel by Anthony Trollope
