= Blaydon =

Town in Tyne and Wear, England

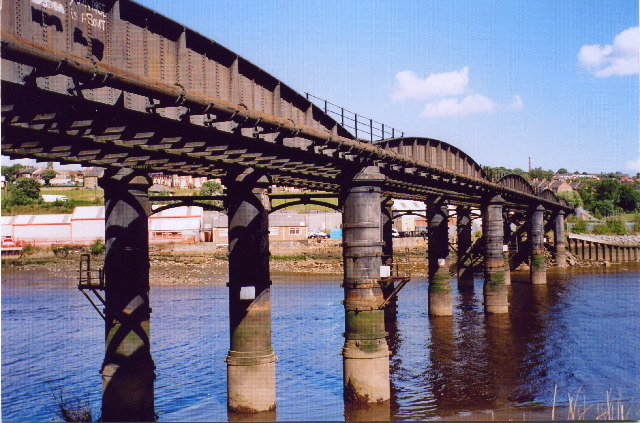
- Scotswood Railway Bridge

- Location within Tyne and Wear
- Population: 15,155
- OS grid reference: NZ2460
- Metropolitan borough: Gateshead
- Metropolitan county: Tyne and Wear
- Region: North East
- Country: England
- Sovereign state: United Kingdom
- Post town: BLAYDON-ON-TYNE
- Postcode district: NE21
- Dialling code: 0191
- Police: Northumbria
- Fire: Tyne and Wear
- Ambulance: North East
- UK Parliament: Blaydon and Consett

Blaydon is a town in the Metropolitan Borough of Gateshead, Tyne and Wear, England, and historically in County Durham. Blaydon, and neighbouring Winlaton, which Blaydon is now contiguous with, form the town of Blaydon-on-Tyne. The Blaydon/Winlaton ward had a population in 2011 of 13,896.

Between 1894 and 1974, Blaydon was an urban district which extended inland from the Tyne along the River Derwent for ten miles (16 km), and included the mining communities of Chopwell and High Spen, the villages of Rowlands Gill, Blackhall Mill, Barlow, Winlaton Mill and Stella, as well as Blaydon and Winlaton. During its existence, the Urban District's fourteen and a half square miles constituted the second largest administrative district by area, on Tyneside, after Newcastle upon Tyne.

== History ==
The town of Blaydon is essentially an industrial area and is not more than two centuries old. Indeed, in the 1760s there was little here but a few farms and cottages. In the latter part of the same century a smelting works was set up from which sprang the industrial growth of the area.

Though the town itself has a relatively short history there has been activity in the area for many centuries.

=== Early history ===
The earliest recorded evidence of human activity at Blaydon is a Neolithic polished stone axe found in the early 20th century. Finds and structures from later prehistoric periods include a bronze spearhead and log-boat, both recovered from the River Tyne in the 19th century. A number of Bronze Age cists are recorded from Summerhill and several others from Bewes Hill.

Little is recorded of medieval Blaydon, which appears to have been based upon the modern farm sites of High and Low Shibdon. The Blaydon Burn Belts Corn Mill, part of a row of 5 or 6 water corn mills stretching from Brockwell Wood to the River Tyne is known to have been present by the early 17th century, suggesting a healthy population at that time. It is likely that, as well as farming, many industrial activities such as mining and quarrying had begun in the medieval and post-medieval periods, well before the industrial period of the 18th to 20th centuries when Blaydon became an important industrial centre.

=== Battle of Stella Ford ===
Also known as the Battle of Newburn or Newburn Ford, this relatively unknown battle has recently been elevated in importance by English Heritage. On 28 August 1640, 20,000 Scots defeated 5,500 English soldiers who were defending the ford over the Tyne four miles (6.4 km) west of Newcastle. The Scots had been provoked by Charles I, who had imposed bishops and a foreign prayer book on their church. The Scots army, led by Alexander Leslie, fought its way to Newcastle and occupied the city for almost a year before Charles I paid it £200,000 to depart. The battle brought to an end the so-called 'Eleven Years of Tyranny' by forcing Charles to recall Parliament.

=== The 18th century and the Industrial Revolution ===
The stimulus for industry at Blaydon and Blaydon Burn, as elsewhere in the region, was the growth in coal mining and the coal trade, particularly from the early 18th century, when the Hazard and Speculation pits were established at Low Shibdon linked to the Tyne by wagonways. The 18th century Blaydon Main Colliery was reopened in the mid-19th century and worked until 1921. Other pits and associated features included Blaydon Burn Colliery, Freehold pit and the Blaydon Burn Wagonway. Industries supported by the coal trade included chemical works, bottle works, sanitary pipe works, lampblack works, an ironworks, a smithy and brickworks - Cowen's Upper and Lower Brickworks were established in 1730 and were associated with a variety of features including a clay drift mine and coal/clay drops. The Lower works remains in operation. Blaydon Burn Coke Ovens, also of 19th-century origin, were replaced in the 1930s by Priestman Ottovale Coke and Tar Works which was the first in the world to produce petrol from coal known as Blaydon Benzole.

In addition to the workers' housing developments associated with industrialisation, a number of grand residences were constructed for industrialists in the area, such as Blaydon Burn House, home of Joseph Cowen, owner of the brickworks. Ironically, the remains of Old Dockendale Hall, an earlier grand residence (or perhaps a superior farmhouse) of 17th century or earlier construction, was destroyed when the coke and tar works was built at Blaydon Burn.

=== Blaydon School Press ===
In the 1930s, pupils at the now demolished Blaydon Intermediate School, under the leadership of English teacher Mr Elliott and art teacher Mr Boyce, gradually developed a technique for producing hardback books. Their productions were highly respected and favourably compared to other successful private printing presses of the time. In one volume produced by the school in 1935, entitled "Songs of Enchantment", the pupils were successful in convincing the famous poet Walter de la Mare to write a foreword in which he praised their enterprise and efforts.

=== Stella South Power Station ===
The post war era of the late 40s and 50s saw a rapid rise in demand for electricity and, in the North East, the extension of existing and construction of a number of new power stations was seen as a key part of the solution. For the Blaydon area, this meant the arrival of a new power station at Stella Haugh, known as the South Stella Power Station, which helped to meet the energy demands of the North East until its closure in 1991. It was demolished in 1992.

== Landmarks ==
=== Axwell Hall ===
On the west of the town and a mile inland from the Tyne is Axwell Park, once the home of the Clavering family. Axwell Hall (also Axwell House) is a Grade II* listed mansion, built for Sir Thomas Clavering by the noted architect James Paine and completed in 1761. The last (10th) baronet died in 1893 and Axwell Hall later found use as a prisoner-of-war camp during the second world war and later as an approved school. Much of the park has been developed for residential purposes and the hall itself was, after two decades of decay, restored. There are plans to convert it to residential apartments.

=== Stella Hall ===
Up-river from Blaydon and outside the town boundary, Stella Hall was a 17th-century mansion set in a park. The house was built by the Tempest family, and in the next century passed by marriage to Lord Widdrington and then into the Towneley family. From 1850 it was owned by Joseph Cowen, owner of the local brickworks and MP for Newcastle, who was followed by his son, also Joseph, again an MP and also the owner of the Newcastle Chronicle. The house was demolished in 1955 to make way for housing.

== Governance ==
Blaydon ward elects three councillors to Gateshead Council. In the House of Commons, the Blaydon constituency has been held by Liz Twist for the Labour Party since 2017. The area has traditionally been a Labour stronghold and the seat has been held by them since 1935.

== Geography ==
Modern Blaydon stands close to the Tyne with the A695, a key road from Gateshead to Hexham, passing through the town centre. Between this main road and the river is the railway and beyond it, on a bend of the Tyne, is the industrial district of Blaydon Haughs. The main part of the town lies south of the railway.

Despite being a largely urban and industrial area, there are various rural aspects to Blaydon and the surrounding area. The area has many acres of open countryside, mostly at 500 feet (150 m) or more above sea level, and numerous farms and similar holdings. Between High Spen and Chopwell are large Forestry Commission woods, and these and other forested areas extend westward down the hillside to the River Derwent, which forms most of the metropolitan district boundary.

Shibdon Pond, on the eastern edge of the town at the former site of Blaydon Main colliery, is a nature reserve with many species of waterfowl. English Nature has designated Shibdon Pond as one of Tyne and Wear's Sites of Special Scientific Interest (SSSIs). The subject of a regeneration campaign, Shibdon Dene (sometimes inaccurately called 'Blaydon Dene') is another recreational area consisting of a pathway between a great number of fine trees.

There is also a nature reserve north-west of Blaydon at Blaydon Burn, on the route of a wagon-way which carried coal to the riverside. The track, roughly a mile-and-a-half long, is used by walkers and cyclists and ends near the Path Head Watermill.

Blaydon contains the following districts, some of them having been swallowed up by urban sprawl.

- Blaydon town centre
- Blaydon Haughs
- South Blaydon (Winlaton)
- Axwell Park
- Shibdon

Stella and Winlaton Mill are outer suburbs of the town, as they are not within Blaydon's boundaries but are nearby.

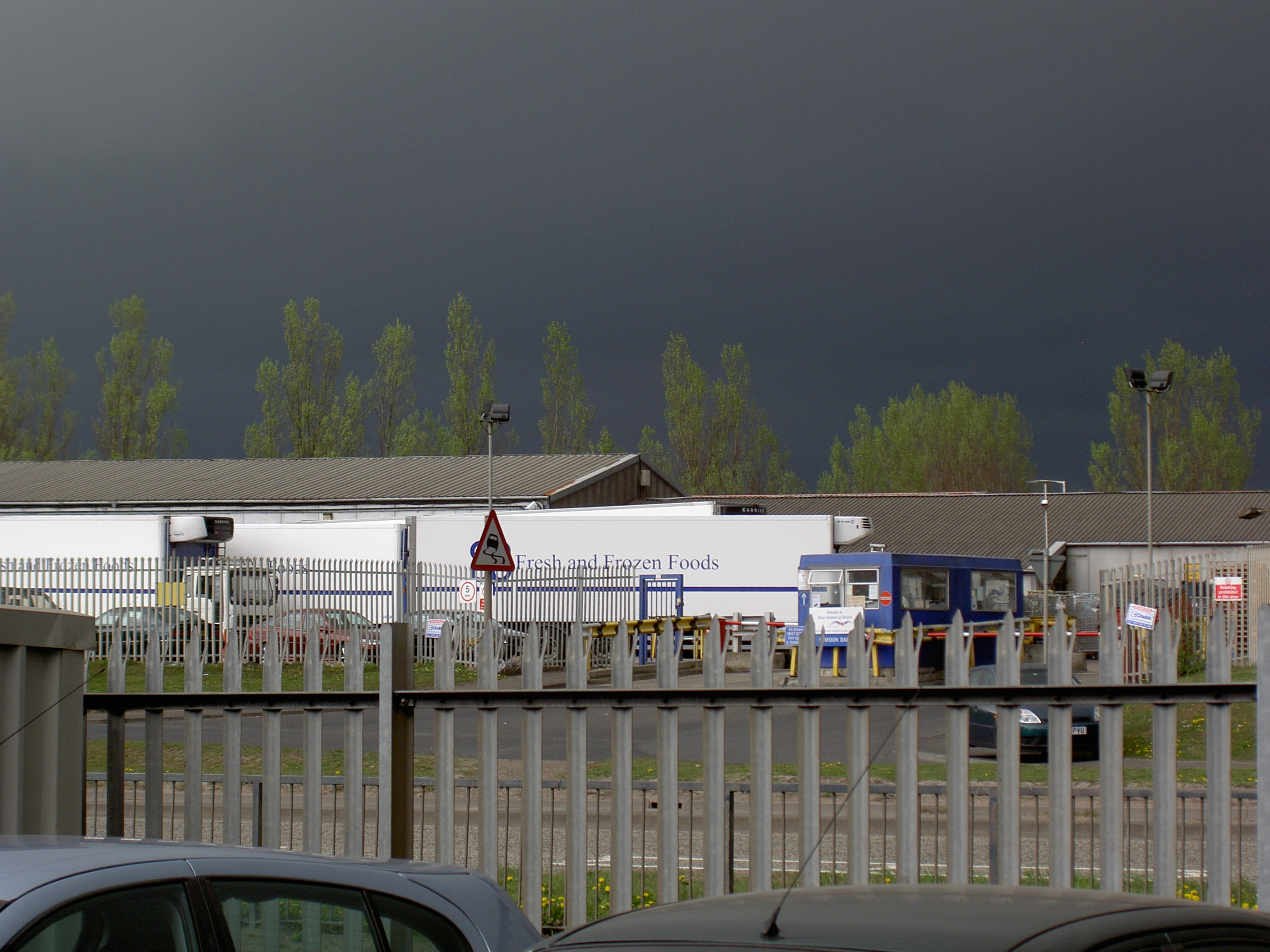
The DFB dairy on Chainbridge Road, Blaydon

== Demography ==
Blaydon had a population of 15,155 in the 2011 census, which increased from 14,648 a decade earlier.

== Economy ==
Once the powerhouse of the Industrial Revolution in Gateshead, Blaydon's traditional industry was coal mining. However, since the decline of mining in the 1950s and 1960s, the economy has diversified. As well as a small number of commuting professionals, residents of Blaydon are often involved in engineering and manufacturing with many businesses operating from premises in Blaydon Haughs (or 'The Spike'), on the banks of the River Tyne.

Blaydon was for a time the head office of Associated Cooperative Creameries (later renamed ACC then ACC Milk). ACC Milk was sold to Dairy Farmers of Britain in 2004. On 3 June 2009, Dairy Farmers of Britain went into receivership and the dairy in Chainbridge Road closed shortly afterwards with the loss of 300 jobs. In 2010 the dairy was acquired by Medina Dairies and reopened, but closed again just a year later.

Blaydon has a shopping centre, known locally as the precinct. A brutalist 1970s creation, it contains the town's major shops. Blaydon Car Boot Sale takes place every Wednesday between March and October at Blaydon RFC. The area underwent a significant programme of housing regeneration between 2009 and 2014 with new developments in progress at High View on the Winlaton-Blaydon border, by the riverside on the site of the former Stella South power station and at Axwell Gardens, near to the existing Axwell Park estate.

== Transport ==
=== Air ===
The nearest airport to Blaydon is Newcastle International Airport, which is located around 14 miles (23 km) away by road. Teesside International Airport and Carlisle Lake District Airport are located around 33 and 59 miles (53 and 95 km) away by road, respectively.

=== Rail ===
Historically, Blaydon was a major railway hub for both passenger and freight services. The town occupied an important geographical position in relation to Newcastle upon Tyne, which could be reached using the Scotswood Railway Bridge. Blaydon served as the eastern terminus of the Newcastle and Carlisle Railway, following the opening of the first section of the line in March 1835.

Blaydon is served by the Tyne Valley Line, with services currently operated by Northern Trains. After a number of years of limited service, 2014 saw the restoration of a much-improved timetable. As of the December 2019 timetable change, there is generally an hourly service between Newcastle and Hexham, with some additional trains stopping during peak times.

=== Road ===
Blaydon is linked to Newcastle upon Tyne and the A1 to the east, by the A695, which used to pass through the centre of the town. The A695 road now bypasses the town centre to the north. The A695 links Blaydon with Hexham, which is located about 20 miles (32 km) to the west of the town.

=== Blaydon bus station ===
Blaydon bus station

General information
- Location: Shibdon Road; Blaydon; Gateshead
- Coordinates: 54.9649°N 1.7136°W
- Owner: Nexus
- Operator: Nexus
- Bus stands: 4
- Connections: Blaydon

Other information
- Fare zone: Network One: 2; Transfare: Green
Location
- Location within Tyne and Wear

Blaydon bus station is served predominantly by Go North East's local bus services, with frequent routes running in and around Gateshead and Newcastle upon Tyne, as well as Northumberland and the Tyne Valley.

In 2009, the bus station was refurbished, at a cost of around £100,000. The refurbishment saw the installation of new shelters at each of its four stands, upgraded lighting systems, and the addition of real-time information systems.

== Education ==
Blaydon is part of the Gateshead Local Education Authority. It is home to a number of primary schools (both faith and secular schools) including Blaydon West primary and St Joseph's, a Roman Catholic primary school. It also has St Thomas More Catholic School, a high achieving Roman Catholic secondary school which serves the Roman Catholic population of the western part of Gateshead borough.

== Religious sites ==
Blaydon has several churches. In the town centre, St Cuthbert's (Church of England, opened in 1845) and St Joseph's (Roman Catholic, opened in 1905 on the site of an earlier church) are opposite each other, on either side of Shibdon Road. Both are impressive structures, and the interiors still reflect the style of architecture used in their construction. Also on Shibdon Road, at the corner with Lucy Street and opposite the entrance to the roof-top car park above Morrisons, is Trinity Methodist Church.

There is also a Catholic church in Stella (St Mary and Thomas Aquinas, opened 1835) .

A brand new Kingdom Hall of Jehovah's Witnesses was opened in 2013, near Cowen Road. This was built by voluntary labour as Witnesses from all over the North-East donned hard hats and work gear, working under the supervision of professional builders.

In Winlaton, the parish church of Winlaton opened in 1828, the Congregational church in 1829, and the Wesleyan Chapel in 1868. The latter two united to form Winlaton United Reformed-Methodist Church, but this closed in August 2015, with some members moving to join Trinity Methodist Church in Blaydon. The Primitive Methodists had opened a building in 1850, which was extended in 1895, and was later to become the Blaydon Corps of the Salvation Army; this corps closed in September 2012. St Anne's Catholic Church in Winlaton was opened in 1962.

== Sports ==
The Blaydon area is the origin of the well-known traditional song "Blaydon Races", written by local musician and showman George 'Geordie' Ridley in 1862. The town's athletic club – the Blaydon Harriers – organise a road running race (called the Blaydon Race) every year on 9 June. The route of the race follows the route outlined by Ridley in his song. The traditional starting point lies outside Balmbra's pub in Newcastle's Bigg Market, and the race follows a course along Scotswood Road before crossing the River Tyne and ultimately finishing in Blaydon town centre. Local councillors, societies and notaries have in recent years organised an annual Blaydon Festival with music, sport and arts events that coincides with the week of race day.

As well as the Blaydon races, The Blaydon Harriers organise regular race meetings on the Shibdon Pond fields (and other venues) throughout the year. These are usually well-attended both by participants and spectators. The Harriers' colours are orange and black.

The rugby union club, Blaydon RFC play in the English National League 2 North, the fourth tier of the English rugby union system and a high level considering the size of the town. The Crow Trees rugby ground is situated to the east of the town, in neighbouring Swalwell. Blaydon RFC play in red shirts and white shorts. The former England international Mick Skinner played for Blaydon. Their smaller but no less illustrious neighbours, Winlaton Vulcans RFC play in Durham and Northumberland Division 2 and number Ken Goodall, the former Ireland and British Lion International, as one of their former players. They play in black shirts, shorts and socks with the club badge of an arm gripping a hammer over an anvil depicting their heritage being formed from the steelworking heritage of the area.

Since 2013 Blaydon has also been host to Blaydon Cycle Club, meeting weekly and throughout the week catering from novice cyclists right through to having a race team competing in local and national events.

== Notable people ==
- Alun Armstrong, former professional footballer with Ipswich Town F.C. and Middlesbrough FC
- Peter Armstrong, the poet and psychotherapist, was born in Blaydon
- Sir Thomas Clavering, 7th Baronet, owner of Axwell Hall
- Joseph Cowen, 19th century politician and journalist
- Graham Onions, Durham and England cricketer
- Bert Tulloch, former professional footballer with Blackpool
- Gavin Webster, stand-up comedian
- William Widdrington, 4th Baron Widdrington, owner of Stella Hall

== See also ==
- Ottovale coke works
