= St Stephen's Church, Skipton =

Roman Catholic Church in Skipton, North Yorkshire, England

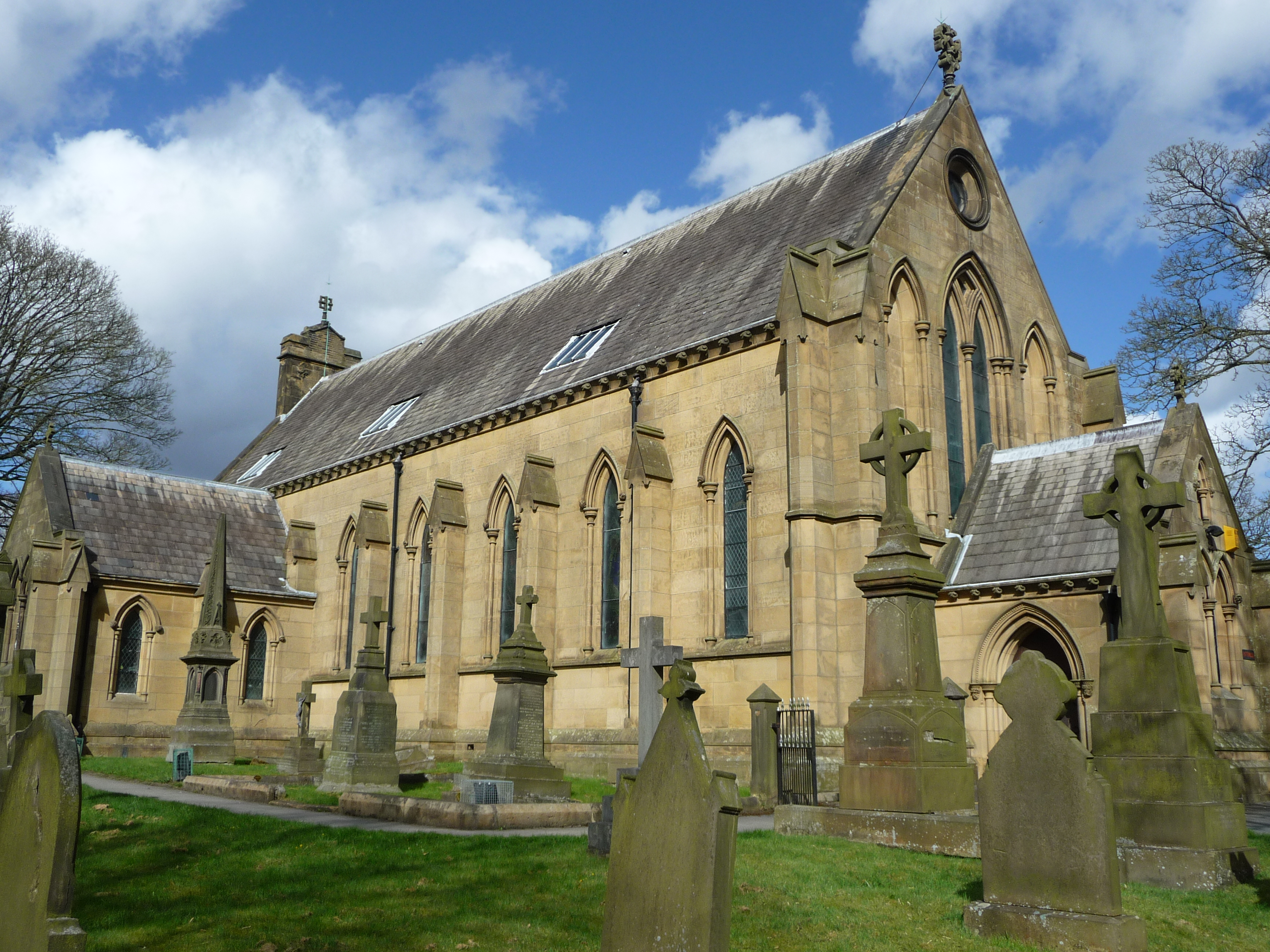
- West side of the church
- St Stephen's Church, Skipton
- 53.9635°N 2.0207°W
- OS grid reference: SD 98741 51938
- Location: Skipton
- Country: England
- Denomination: Roman Catholic
- Website: StStephensSkipton.org.uk

History
- Status: Parish church
- Founded: 27 October 1836
- Founder: Tempest family
- Dedication: Saint Stephen

Architecture
- Functional status: Active
- Heritage designation: Grade II listed
- Designated: 2 March 1978
- Completed: 1836
- Construction cost: £1681

Administration
- Province: Liverpool
- Diocese: Leeds
- Deanery: Keighley & Skipton

St Stephen's Church is a Roman Catholic Parish church in Skipton, North Yorkshire, England. It is situated next to Ermysted's Grammar School close to the town centre. It was built in 1836 and was founded by the Tempest family and originally administered by the Society of Jesus. It is a Grade II listed building.

== Foundation ==
During the Reformation, the Tempest family held Masses in their family home Broughton Hall. A priest would regularly travel there to provide for the local Catholics from 1648. In January 1694, a Jesuit, Fr Thomas Burnett SJ came to the house and resided there until he died in 1727. From then on, Broughton served as a residence for Jesuit priests to administer to the local Catholic population.

== Construction ==
In 1836, seven years after Catholic emancipation the foundation stone for the church was laid by Charles Tempest. A dispute arose between the new parish priest Fr Michael Trappes and Charles Tempest on whether the church would be a parish church, which would be under the priest's supervision, or a family chapel, owned by the Tempests. It meant that the church was not opened five years after it was completed. Finally, the Vicar Apostolic of the Northern District, John Briggs solved the dispute by permitting the Tempests to nominate a priest and pay for the running costs of the church.

The church was opened on 15 September 1842 and the Mass was presided over by Thomas Tempest, Charles' brother, who became a priest in 1826.

== Extensions ==
In 1850, the increasing Catholic population meant that the church had to be enlarged and a school built. By 29 September 1853, the extension was completed with a new reredos by Augustus Pugin was added along with transepts to accommodate a new side chapel. A presbytery was also built so that the parish could have a resident priest and a Fr George Bridges SJ arrived into the parish. In 1854, St Stephen's School opened and from 1861 it was staffed by the Sisters of Mercy. From 1866, the Faithful Companions of Jesus took over the running of the school. In 1970, they left the parish and were replaced by the Religious of the Sacred Heart of Mary who remained there until 2003.

The Jesuits served the parish until 1914 when was then handed over to the Diocese of Leeds who continue to serve the parish.

== Parish ==
The parish has four Sunday Masses every week, with three at the church: Saturday at 5:00 pm, Sunday at 10:30 am and 6:00 pm. There is one Mass at Broughton Hall at 9:15 am every Saturday, and one at St Margaret Clitherow's Church, Threshfield (near Grassington), at 9:00 am every Sunday.

St Stephen's Primary School, next to the church, states that it 'works hand in hand with St. Stephen's Church in enabling everyone to grow spiritually.'

== Gallery ==
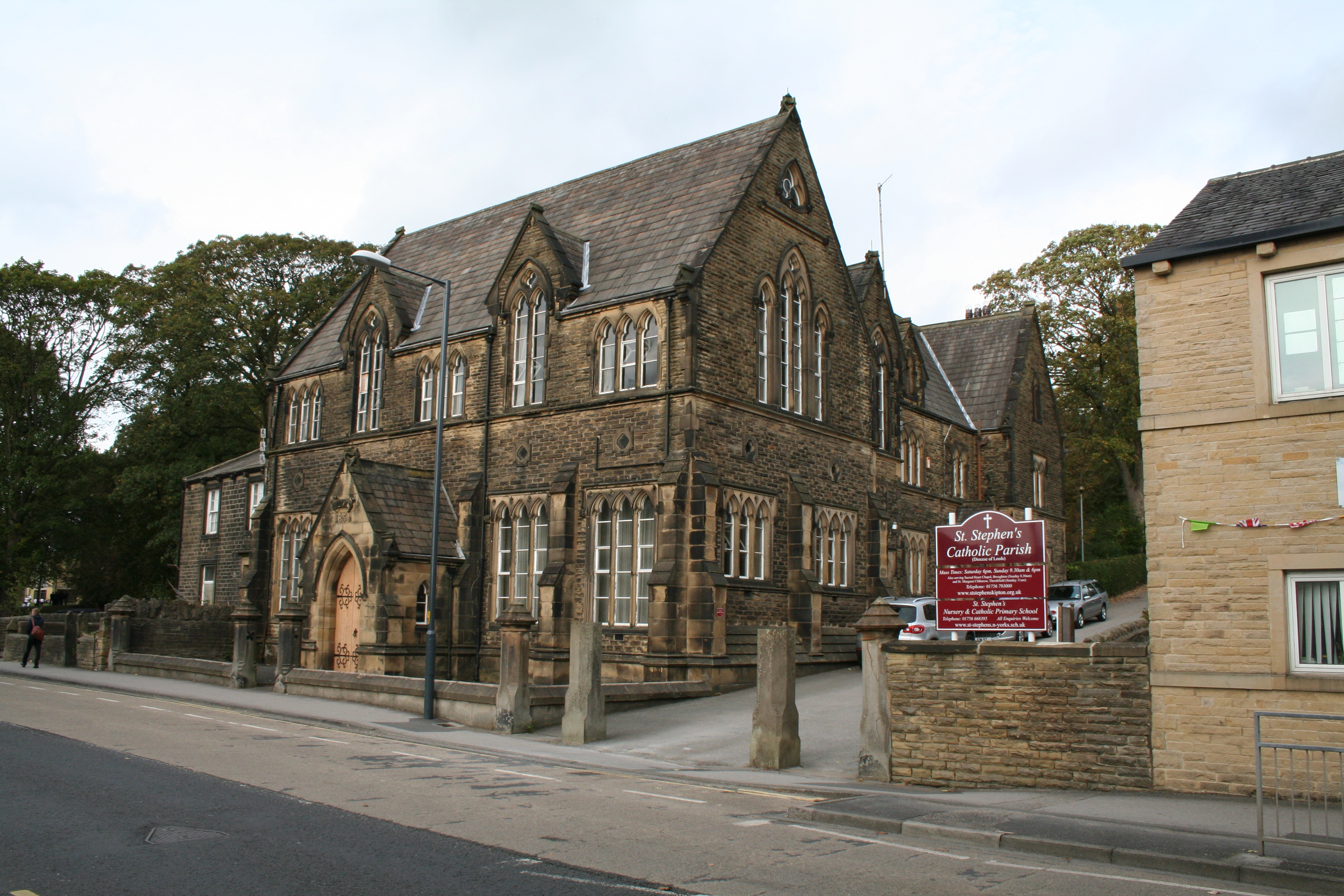
Entrance of driveway to church

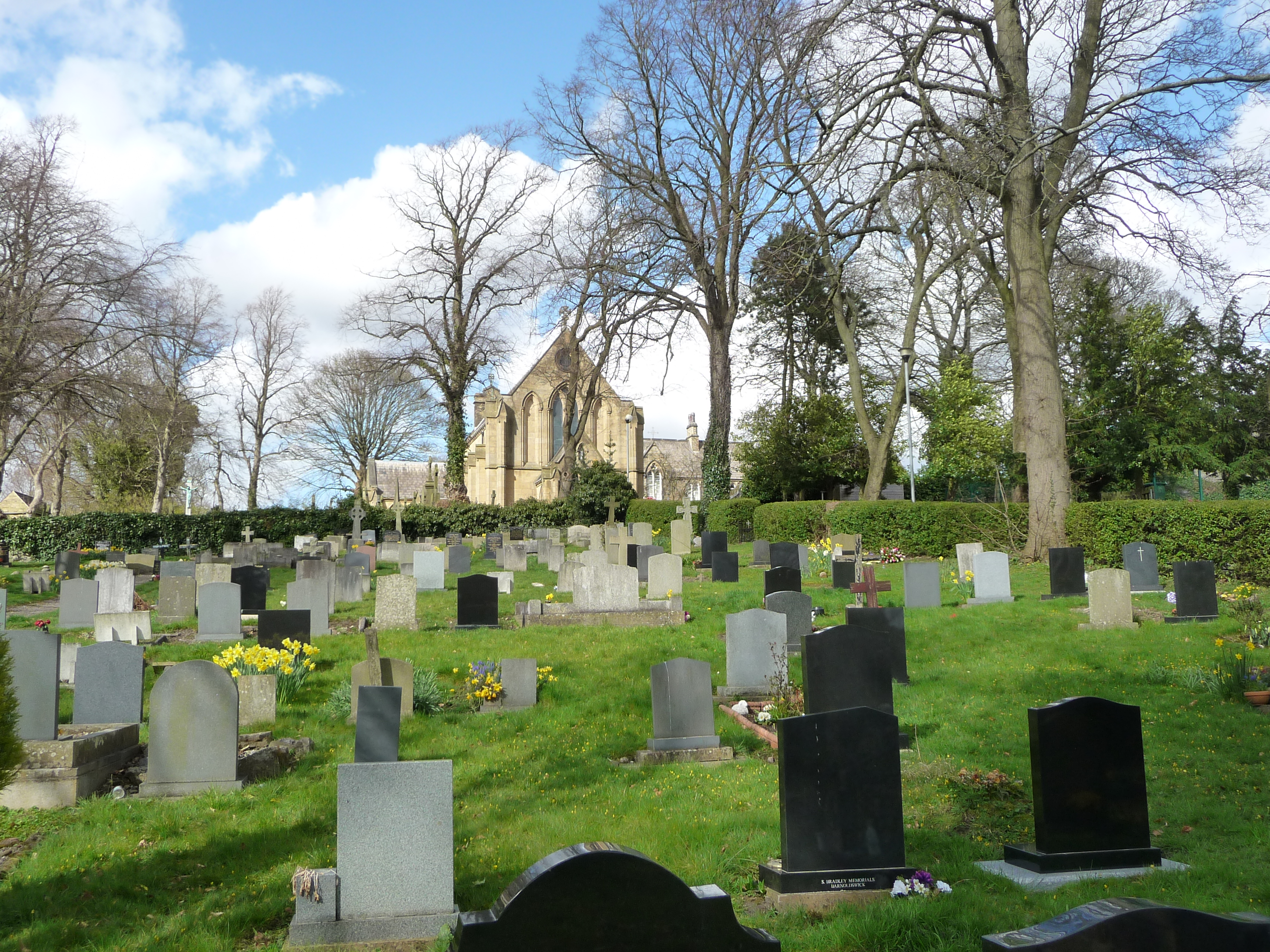
View across cemetery

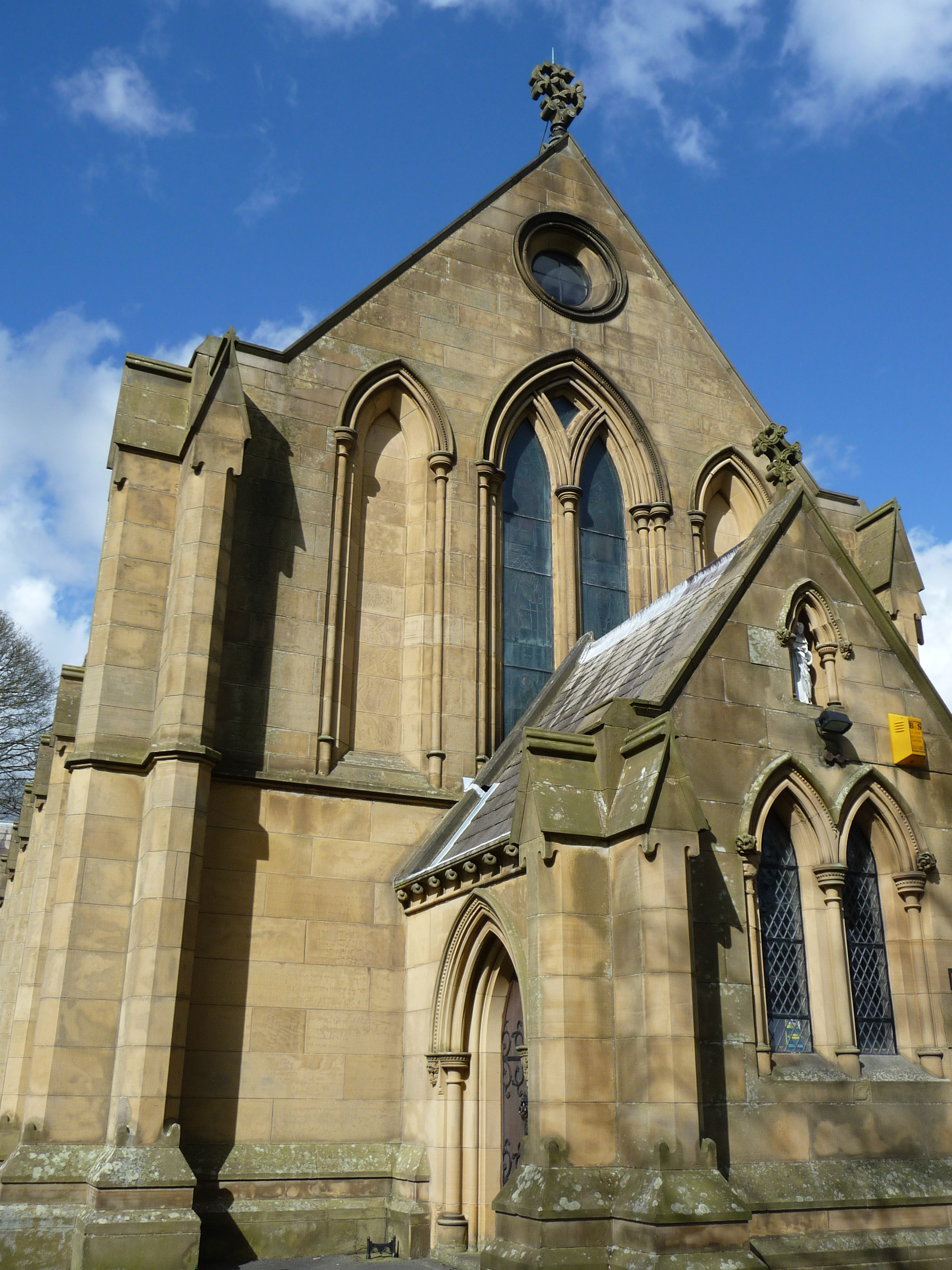
Front entrance

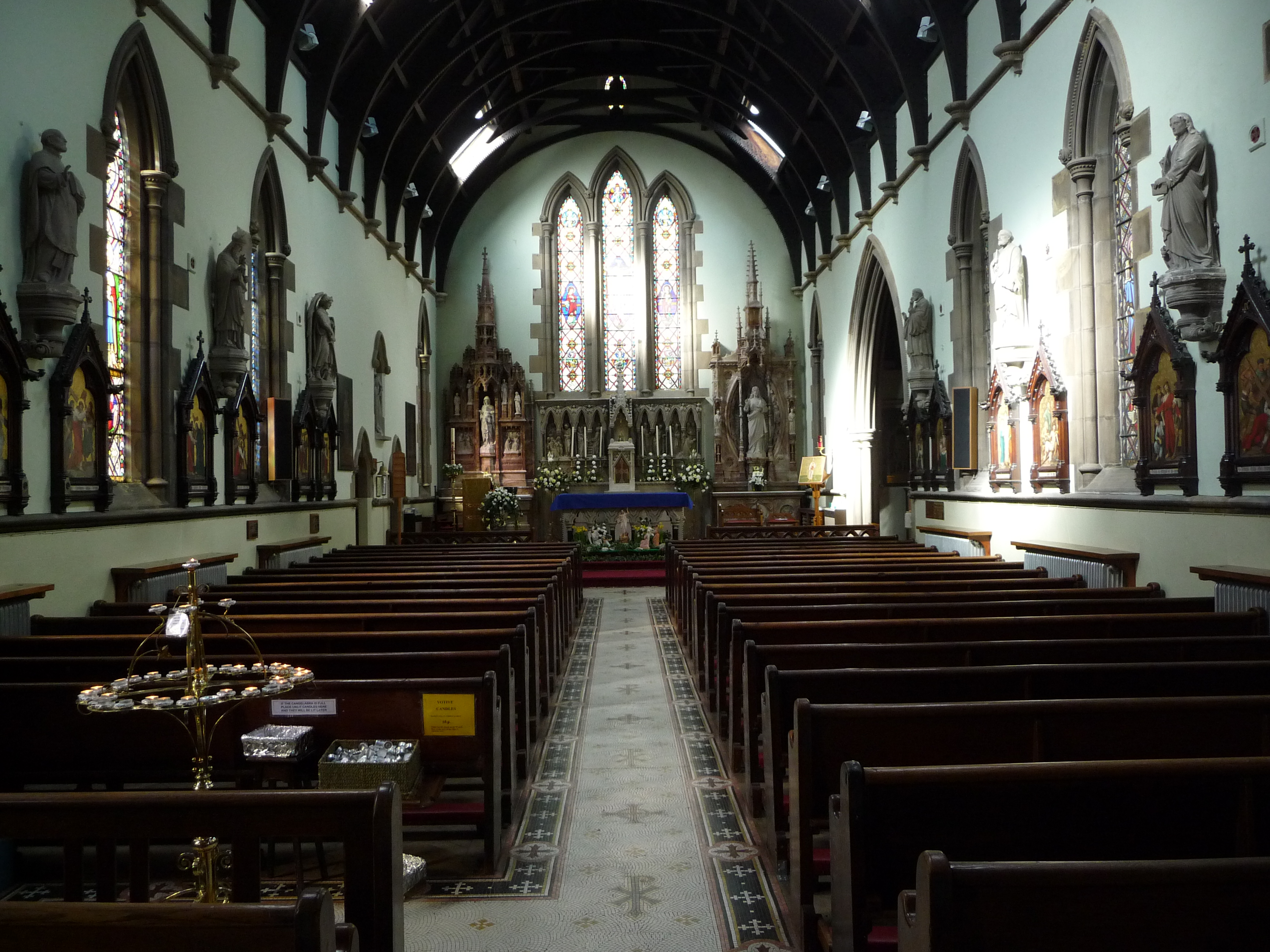
Interior

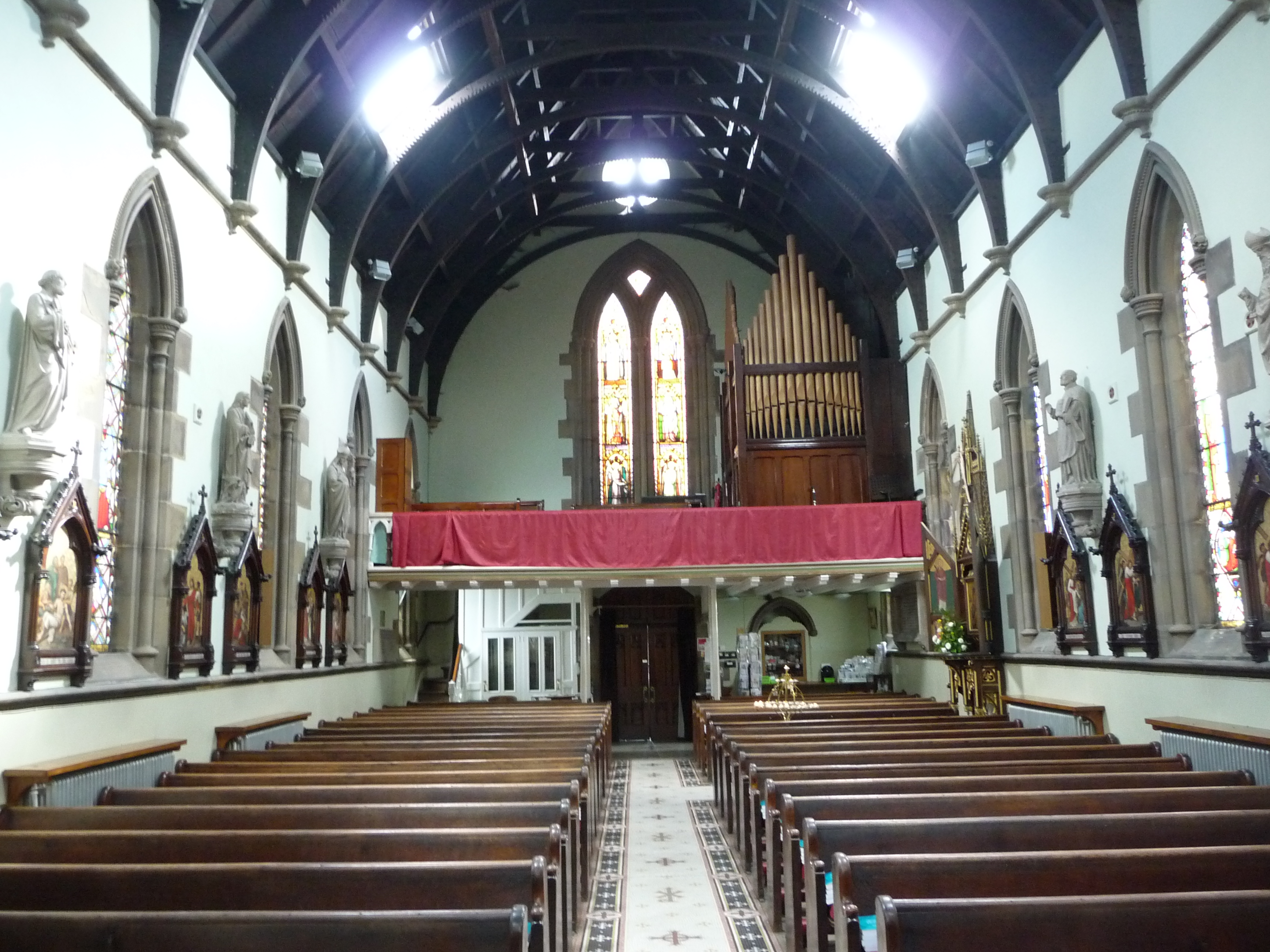
Church organ

== See also ==
- Tempest family
- Listed buildings in Skipton
- Society of Jesus
