= Newton Grange, Skipton =

Grade II listed Georgian house in Skipton, North Yorkshire, England

Coordinates: 53°58′04″N 2°08′06″W

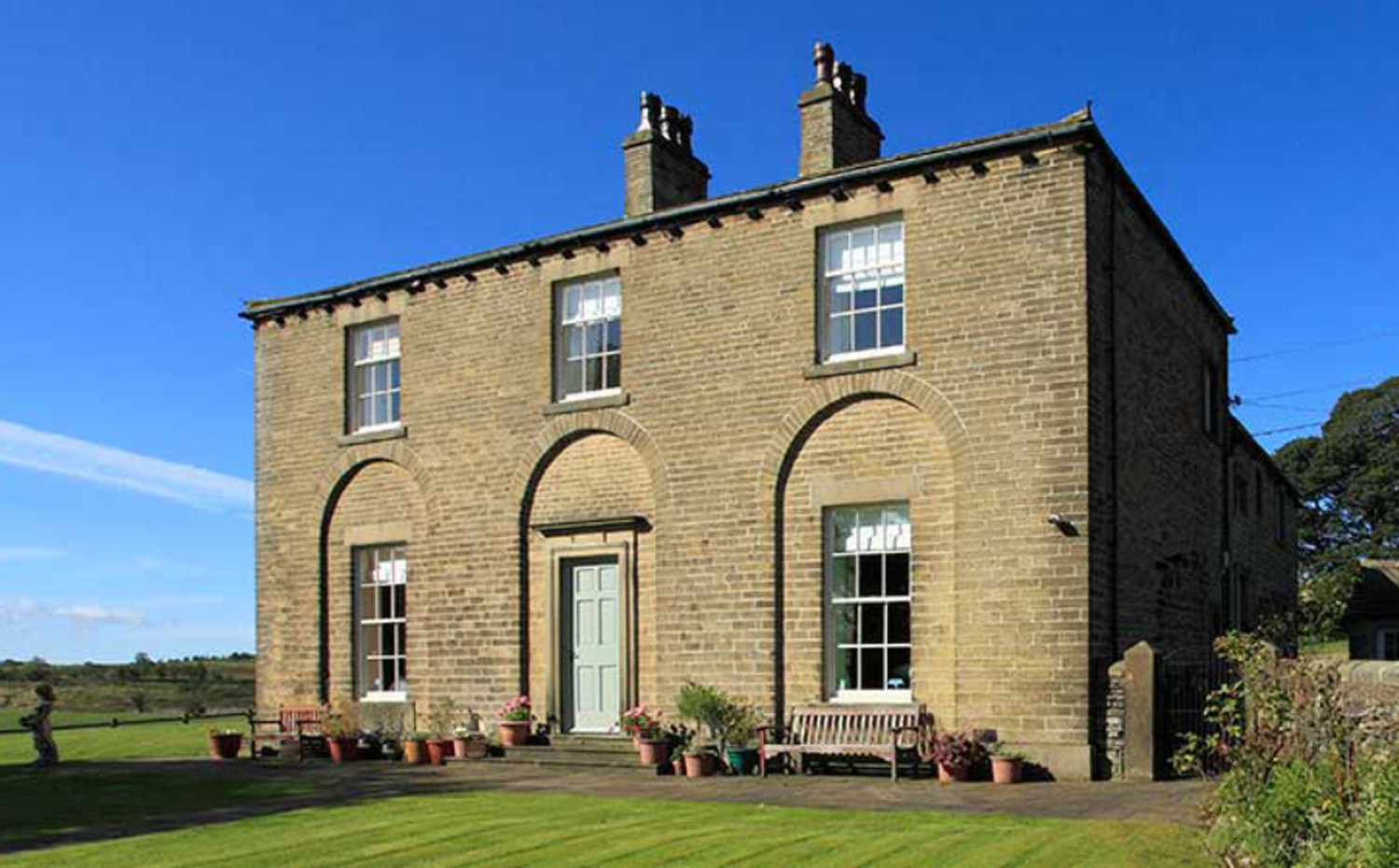
Newton Grange

Newton Grange in Bank Newton, Skipton, in Yorkshire is a Georgian house of historical significance and is Grade II listed on the English Heritage Register. It was built in about 1800 by Richard Greenwood, a gentleman, and was the private residence for many notable families. It is now a wedding venue and provides holiday cottage accommodation.

== Early history ==
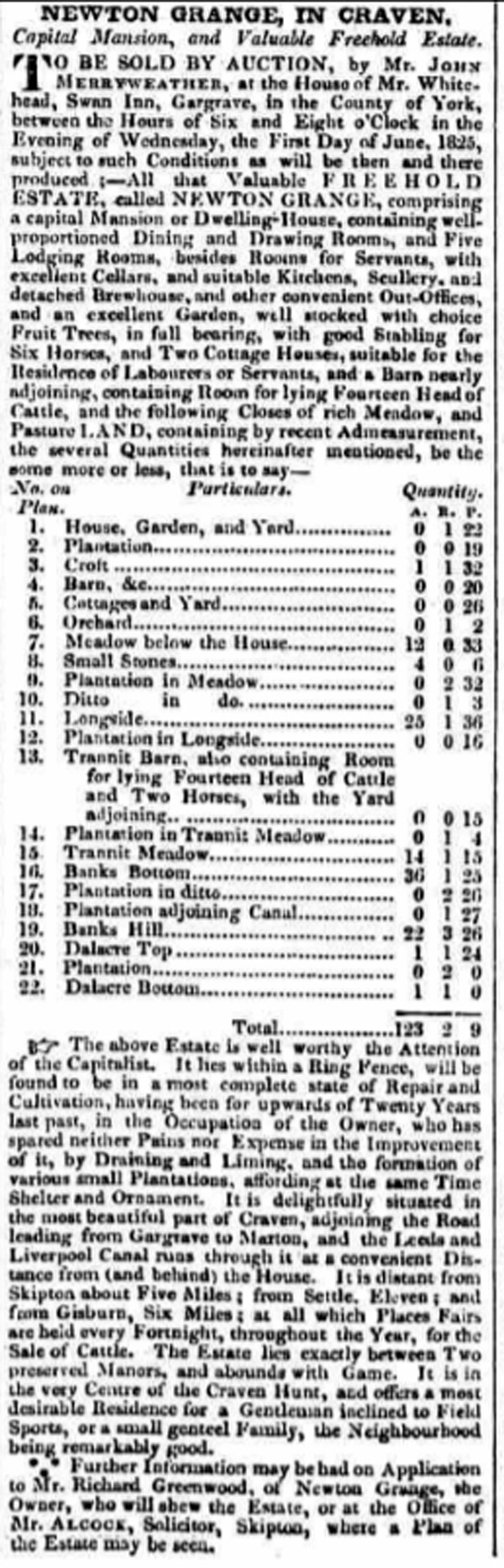
Sale notice for Newton Grange in 1825

Before the Georgian house was built, the property was a farming estate owned by several notable people. Some of the buildings from this time still exist. Records show that in 1691 the estate was owned by Hugh Currer who decided to leave his home of Kildwick Hall and live in this smaller residence. After this the estate was sold to the Tempest family of Myer House, Marton, Yorkshire. According to their family historian Eleanor Blanche Tempest, who wrote 3 volumes called Tempest Pedigrees, James Tempest (1693–1764) owned "Newton Grange in the parish of Gargrave" in about 1750. His third son James Tempest (born in 1733) lived there with his wife Isabel from 1759 until 1761. His daughter Elizabeth was born at Gargrave in 1760. The book Tempest Pedigrees records that in 1764 when his father died "he sold the Newton Grange farm to Christopher Greenwood for £1,240 to pay legacies." Christopher Greenwood lived there for some time and when he died in 1793 it was inherited by his son Richard Greenwood.

== The Greenwood family ==
Richard Greenwood (1769–1847), who was described as "a gentleman", appears to be the main creator of Newton Grange as it is today. He built the main part of the house in about 1800 shortly after he was married.

Richard married Sarah Buck (1769–1842) in 1795 in Gargrave. Sarah was the daughter of John Buck a prominent grazier from Bank Newton. They had four children, three daughters and one son. In 1825 they sold the Newton Grange estate and moved to Gargrave. The advertisement for the sale of the property is shown. The house was described in the following terms.

"A capital mansion or dwelling house containing well-proportioned dining and drawing rooms and five lodging rooms. Also rooms for servants with excellent cellars, with suitable kitchen, scullery and detached brew house and other out offices."

The property was bought by Sir Charles Robert Tempest of Broughton Hall. The Tempest family historian records that “in 1826, he bought the Newton Grange farm from R. Greenwood for £8,450”. It has remained as part of the Broughton Estate since this time.

== Later residents ==
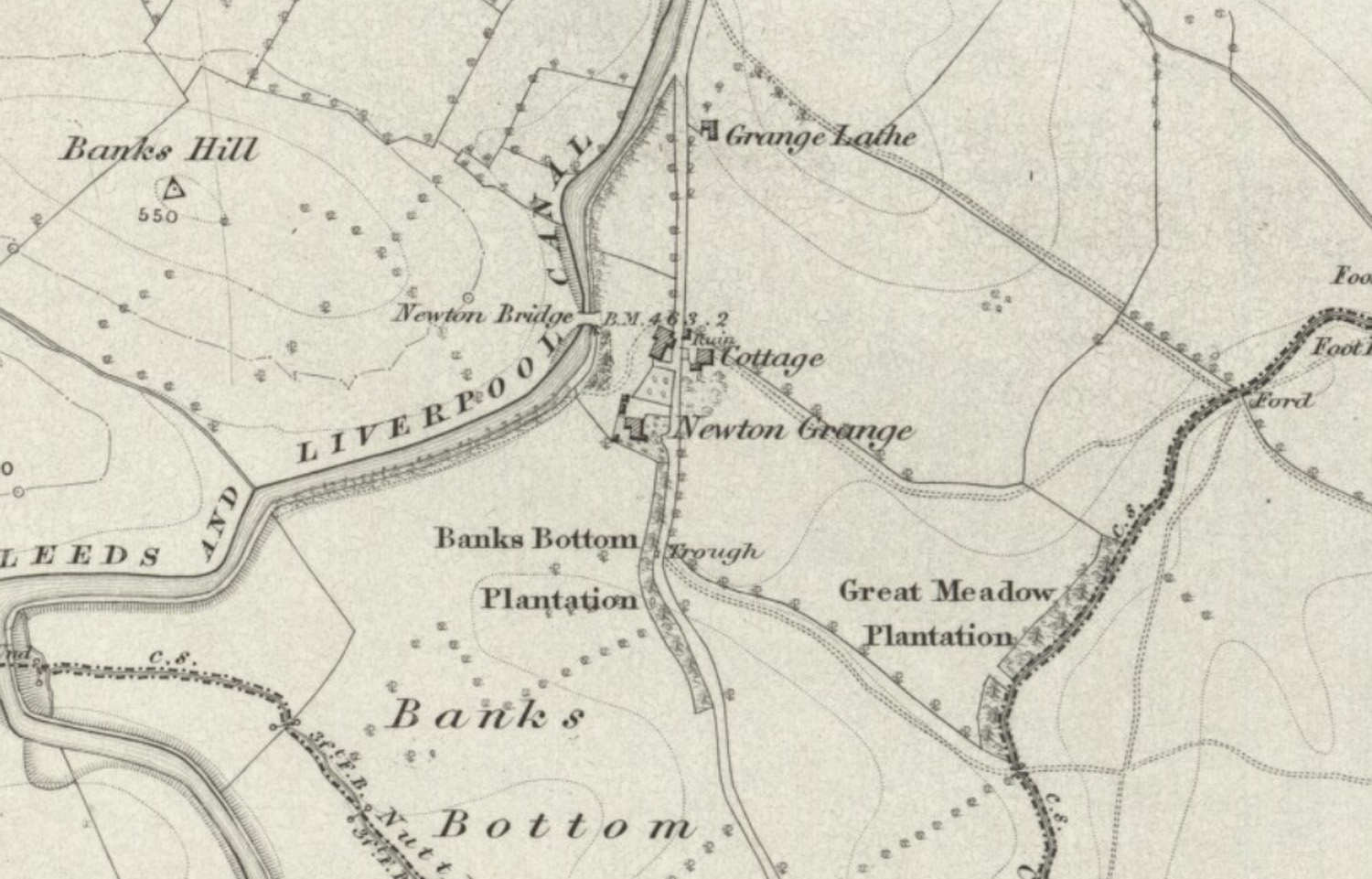
Map of Newton Grange in 1848

George Watson (1802–1875) tenanted Newton Grange from about 1840 until 1870. He was born in 1802 in Kirkby Malzeard. His family were farmers who lived in this area for many years and his father and grandfather have gravestones in St Andrew’s Churchyard in Kirkby Malzeard. In 1830 he married Mary Richardson whose family also lived in Kirkby Malzeard. The couple had six children and the 1841 Census shows them living at Newton Grange with three of them and three servants. Their son John died in 1855 and was buried at St Andrews Churchyard with their ancestors. Mary, his wife died in 1870 and he moved to Penrith, Cumbria. He died there in 1875. They were all buried in Kirkby Malzeard and there is a tombstone there which reads:

"In memory of John son of George and Mary Watson of Newton Grange in the Parish of Gargrave who died January 22nd 1855 aged 16 years, also the above named Mary Watson who died at Kirby Lonsdale May 12th 1870 Aged 61 years. Also the above George Watson of Croft House Penrith died on the 5th of April 1875 aged 73 years"

From about 1870 when George Watson left until about 1886 Thomas Dugdill (1823–1886) rented Newton Grange. Thomas was born in 1823 in Rylstone. His father was Matthew Dugdill, a farmer from this area. In 1854 he married Mary Ann Litton and they had one daughter named Ellen. The family lived on a farm in Hetton for about fourteen years. Then in 1868 Mary Ann died and soon after Thomas moved to Newton Grange with his daughter. He lived there until his death in 1886.

Newton Grange was next rented to Sarah Holmes who was a widow. Sarah was born in 1829 in Haworth, Yorkshire. Her father was John Bancroft, a farmer in Haworth. In 1854 she married John Holmes a farmer and they had four children. During this time they lived on a farm in Haworth. Unfortunately John died in 1869 but Sarah continued farming in Haworth until about 1890 when she moved to Newton Grange with three of her now adult children and their wives and families. Sarah died in 1895 and the property was tenanted by a succession of farmers the most notable was the Taylor family who were residents from about 1910 until 1955.

== See also ==
- Listed buildings in Bank Newton
