= Janet Tempest =

British Catholic philanthropist

- Born: Janet Evelyn Mary Longton; 1930; Argentina
- Died: 25 December 2021 (aged 90–91)
- Occupation: Philanthropist
- Spouse: Henry Tempest
- Children: 5 (including Annie Tempest)
- Parent: Harold Longton (father)
- Relatives: Tempest family (by marriage)

Janet Evelyn Mary Tempest (née Longton; 1930- 25 December 2021) was an Argentine-born British landowner and Catholic philanthropist. She was the châtelaine of Broughton Hall, the seat of the Tempest family in North Yorkshire. A devout Catholic, she was a devotee of Mother Teresa, having met her in India. She volunteered internationally with the Missionaries of Charity and ran a clothing bank at Broughton Hall for the poor in Kolkata and in Eastern Europe. Tempest also funded the construction of an extension to St. Stephen's Catholic Primary School and Nursery in Skipton. In 2004, she sustained permanent injuries from falling off a camel while on safari in Kenya.

== Early life ==
Tempest was born Janet Evelyn Mary Longton, the daughter of Harold Longton, in 1930 in Argentina. She spent the first seven years of her childhood in Argentina before moving with her family to South Africa.

== Marriage and issue ==
She married Henry Roger Tempest, a member of the Tempest family, on 18 January 1957. They had five children:

- Bridget Mary Tempest (born 12 October 1957)
- Anne Valerie Tempest (born 22 August 1959)
- Mary Hazel Tempest (born 1961)
- Roger Henry Tempest (born 9 August 1963)
- Piers Martin Tempest (born 19 November 1973)

== Catholic charity work ==
She was a devout Catholic and a devotee of Mother Teresa, having met the nun in India. She volunteered with the Missionaries of Charity around the world and, since 1975, ran a clothing bank at Broughton Hall for the poor in Kolkata and in Eastern Europe. In 2012, she funded a new extension at St. Stephen's Catholic Primary School & Nursery in Skipton.

== Broughton Hall ==
Upon her husband's inheritance of Broughton Hall from his older brother, she became the estate's châtelaine. She offered tours and opened the house to the public to keep it running. She served as a director of the estate. In 2018 the hall's business park was home to more than 50 companies employing more than 700 people.

In 2007, she hosted Anne, Princess Royal at Broughton Hall.

== Injury and death ==
In 2004 she fell off of a camel while on safari in Kenya. She was flown by jet from Nairobi back to the United Kingdom and was treated at Leeds General Infirmary. The injury left her in a wheelchair for the remainder of her life. She died on 25 December 2021. A Catholic funeral service was held at Broughton Chapel on the family estate.
