= Tottering-by-Gently =

Tottering-by-Gently is a cartoon strip that features weekly in Country Life magazine. It was first created by artist Annie Tempest in 1993. The story is set in Tottering-by-Gently, a village in the fictional county of North Pimmshire, in which ‘the big house’, Tottering Hall, is inhabited by Lord and Lady Tottering, affectionately known as Daffy and Dicky, and their two dogs Slobber and Scribble. Through them and their extended family, Tempest casts her gimlet eye over everything from intergenerational tensions and the differing perspectives of men and women, to field sports, diet, ageing, gardening, fashion, food, convention and much more.

Original Tottering-by-Gently cartoons are displayed as an attraction at London's Lansdowne Club, Naval and Military Club and Crockham Hill's Royal Oak Pub.
