= Henry Tempest =

English landowner

Henry Roger Tempest DL (2 April 1924 – 6 May 2017) was an English landowner of the Tempest family and the owner of Broughton Hall. He was married to Catholic philanthropist Janet Tempest and was the father of the artist Annie Tempest.
