= Newton Grange =

Newton Grange may refer to:

- Newton Grange, Derbyshire, a civil parish in Derbyshire
- Newton Grange, Skipton, a listed building in Yorkshire

== See also ==
- Newtongrange, a village in Midlothian
