= Annie Tempest =

British artist

Anne Valerie Tempest (born 22 August 1959), known as Annie Tempest, is a British artist, sculptor and cartoonist initially known for her cartoon strip The Yuppies which ran for seven years in the Daily Mail, and now for her strip Tottering-by-Gently which has appeared in Country Life magazine since 1993.

== Family ==
Tempest was born on 22 August 1959 in Zambia. She was the second of five children of Henry and Janet Tempest. Her father was the second son of the Tempests of Broughton Hall. When she was two, her family came back to England. She attended Rye St Antony School in Oxford and St Mary's School Ascot.

In 1970, her father inherited the Broughton Hall estate in Yorkshire from his brother, and she draws on her memories of Broughton Hall in the Tottering By Gently comic strip. She has also said that Lord Tottering is modelled on her father Henry, and Lady Tottering is partly modelled on herself. The 3,000 acre Broughton Hall estate is now run by her brother Roger, who is the oldest son of her father.

Annie Tempest married the composer James McConnel in 1991; they had a son (Freddy) and a daughter (Daisy). They divorced in 2006. Both her children feature in the Tottering-by-Gently comic strip as grandchildren of Lord and Lady Tottering. Freddy died of a heroin overdose in 2011 at the age of 18, and Annie Tempest has said that she intends to retain him in the comic strip, but that he will remain 18.

== Work ==
Tempest's first book How Green are you Wellies? (1985), led to a cartoon strip in the Daily Express called Westenders.

Her cartoon strip The Yuppies, which ran for seven years in the Daily Mail from 1985 to 1993, led to her being recognized by The Cartoonists' Club of Great Britain as "Strip Cartoonist of the year".

Tottering-by-Gently prints, books and products are sold throughout the UK and she has had a number of exhibitions in the UK and abroad. The strip has run in Country Life magazine since 1993.

In 2009, the Cartoon Art Trust awarded Tempest the Pont Award for her portrayal of the British character.
