= Bank Newton =

Settlement and civil parish in North Yorkshire, England

Coordinates: 53.974°N 2.139°W

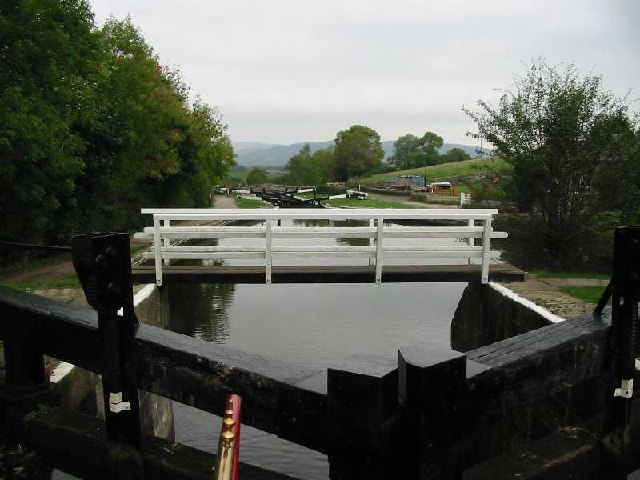
Canal lock at Bank Newton

Bank Newton is a small settlement and civil parish county of North Yorkshire, England. According to the 2001 census the parish had a population of 47, and at the 2011 census the population of the civil parish remained less than 100 and therefore its details were included in the civil parish of Gargrave. In 2015, North Yorkshire County Council estimated the population of the parish to be 50.

Until 1974 it was part of the West Riding of Yorkshire. From 1974 to 2023 it was part of the Craven District, it is now administered by the unitary North Yorkshire Council.

It is about 6 miles (9.7 km) west of Skipton and is on the Leeds and Liverpool Canal; there are six locks on the canal at Bank Newton. In 2016, as part of the canal's bicentenary, lock number 38 was officially renamed the 'Mike Clarke Lock' in commemoration to the president of The Leeds and Liverpool Society, Mike Clarke.

Notable historic houses include the Grade II listed Newton Grange which now provides holiday cottage accommodation and is a venue for weddings, and the grade II* listed Bank Newton Hall.

== See also ==
- Listed buildings in Bank Newton
