= All Saints' Church, Broughton =

Church in North Yorkshire, England

Coordinates: 53°56′58″N 2°06′07″W

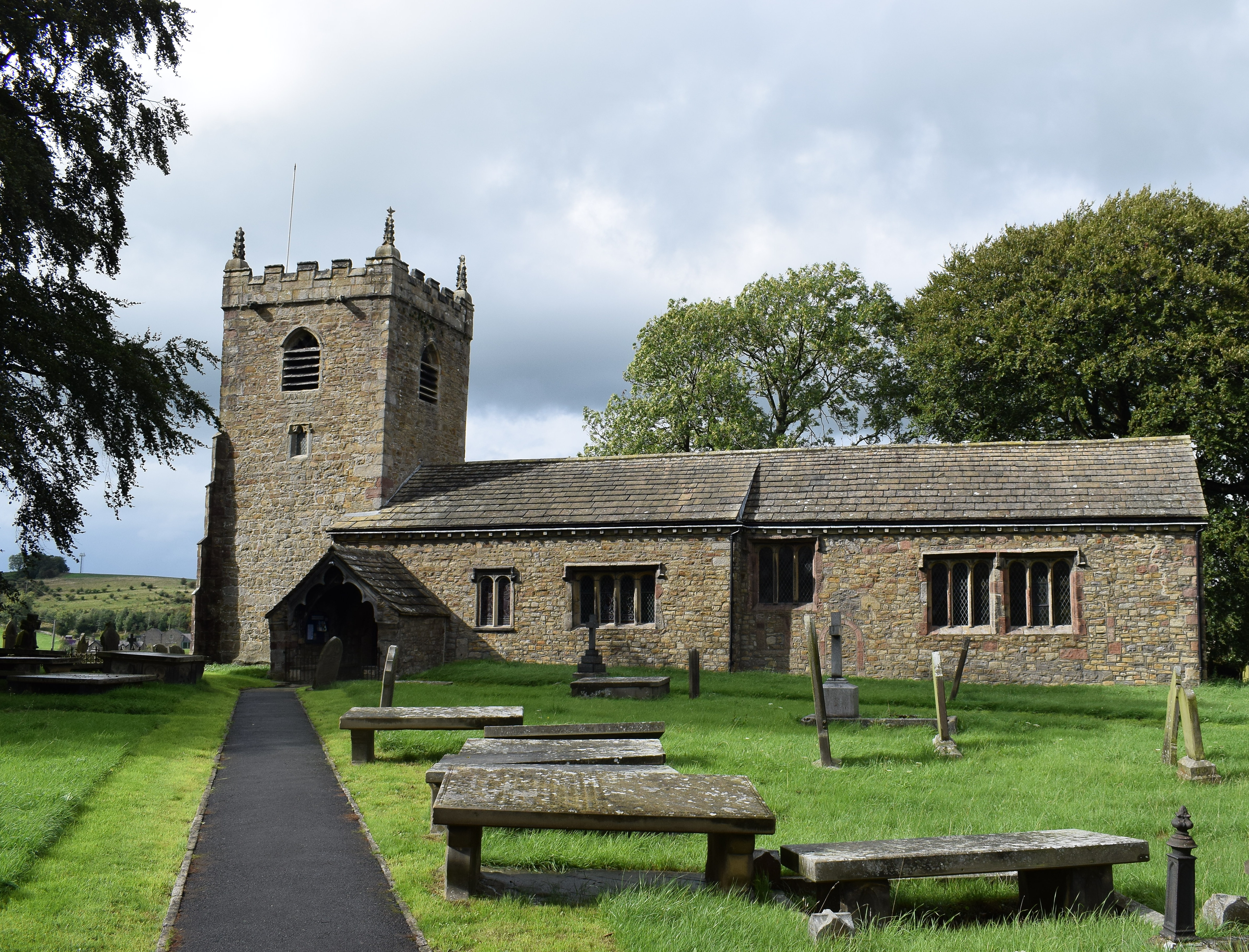
The church, in 2018

All Saints' Church is the parish church of Broughton, a village in North Yorkshire, in England.

No church in Broughton is recorded in the Domesday Book, the first reference to one being in 1120. The oldest part of the church is part of the south wall including the main doorway, which is 12th century. The rest of the church was rebuilt, probably in the early 16th century. In 1873, William Henry Crossland heavily restored the chancel, and rebuilt the roof of the nave. The church was Grade I listed in 1954.

Alan Bennett described a visit to the church: "We sit outside listening to the wind streaming through a huge copper beech and talk about this ordinary enough church which has been bound up with great events in the nation's history." The grass in the churchyard is kept down by a small flock of sheep. The church is described as "rather cold in winter".

The church is built of stone, with a stone slate roof. It consists of a nave and a chancel under a continuous roof, a north aisle, a south porch and a west tower, and is in Perpendicular style. The tower has angle buttresses, arched bell openings, gargoyles, and an embattled parapet with corner pinnacles. The south doorway has one order of waterleaf capitals and the shafts lost. In the south wall of the chancel is a round-headed priest's door, and the east window has three cusped traceried lights. Inside are two alabaster sculptures of the Virgin Mary, found during the Victorian restoration; various monuments to the Tempest family; and a 12th-century font.

== See also ==
- Grade I listed buildings in North Yorkshire (district)
- Listed buildings in Broughton, west North Yorkshire
