= Bank Newton Hall =

Historic building in Bank Newton, England

Coordinates: 53°58′26″N 2°08′24″W

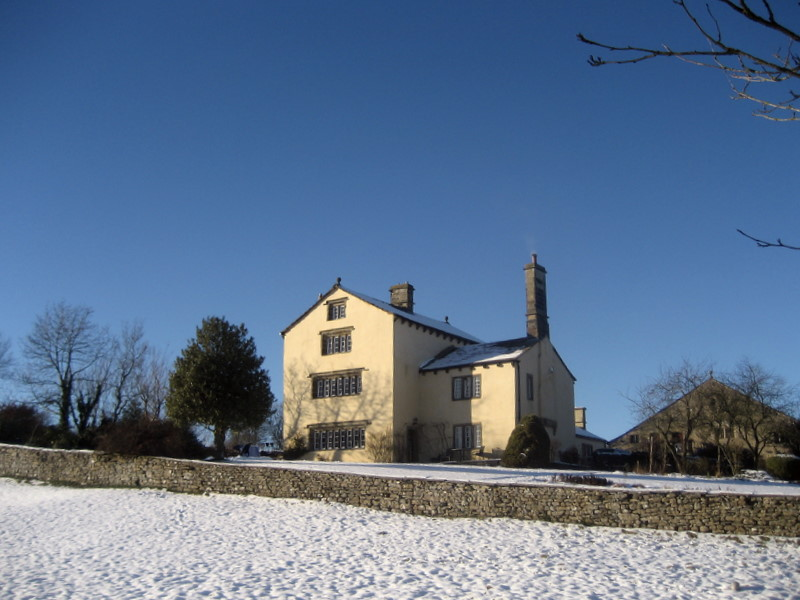
The building, in 2010

Bank Newton Hall is a historic building in Bank Newton, a village in North Yorkshire, in England.

The older wing of the building dates from the mid-17th century, when it may have constituted one wing of a larger house. An extension was added in the 18th century, and the rear elevation was altered in the 19th century. The house was grade II* listed in 1964.

The building is constructed of rendered stone with a stone slate roof. The original block has three storeys and an attic, and a single bay. It has a single double-chamfered window in each floor with from eight to two lights. This tiering of windows of reducing width makes them the key architectural feature of the house. Each window has a hood mould, and there is a ball finial on the gable apex. On the left return is a massive chimney breast, and at the rear are round-headed windows, including a stair window. The extension to the right is lower with two storeys, and it contains mullioned windows. Inside, the newer wing has an original fireplace, and there is believed to be another in the older part, along with a panel with a carving of a coat of arms.

== Barn ==
Northwest of Bank Newton Hall is an aisled barn, also dating from the mid-17th century. It is built of stone with a stone slate roof. It is double-aisled, and has five bays and a two-storey bay at the southeast end. The barn contains doorways and windows with chamfered surrounds; one doorway has a round-arched had, and others have elliptical heads. It has a king post roof. Historic England describes it as "the best barn in the area", and it is separately listed at grade II*.

== See also ==
- Listed buildings in Bank Newton
