= Listed buildings in Bank Newton =

Bank Newton is a civil parish in the county of North Yorkshire, England. It contains 16 listed buildings that are recorded in the National Heritage List for England. Of these, two are listed at Grade II*, the middle of the three grades, and the others are at Grade II, the lowest grade. The parish contains the settlements of Bank Newton and Little Stainton, and the surrounding countryside. The Leeds and Liverpool Canal runs through the parish and a number of its bridges and locks are listed, The other listed buildings consist of houses, farmhouses and farm buildings.

== Key ==
Grade	Criteria
II*	Particularly important buildings of more than special interest
II	Buildings of national importance and special interest

== Buildings ==
Name and location	Photograph	Date	Notes	Grade
Outbuilding, Newton Grange Farm; 53.96830°N 2.13414°W	—	17th century	The outbuilding is possibly a fragment of a previous farmhouse, and is in stone with a stone slate roof. It has an L-shaped plan, and contains three rooms.	II
Bank Newton Hall; 53.97397°N 2.13991°W		17th century	The house, which was extended in the 18th century, is in rendered stone with a stone slate roof. The original block has three storeys and an attic, and a single bay. It has a single double-chamfered window in each floor with from eight to two lights and a hood mould, and a ball finial on the gable apex. On the left return is a massive chimney breast, and at the rear are round-headed windows, including a stair window. The extension to the right is lower with two storeys, and it contains mullioned windows.	II*
Barn northwest of Newton Hall; 53.97432°N 2.14019°W	—	Mid 17th century	The barn is in stone with a stone slate roof. It is double-aisled, and has five bays and a two-storey bay at the southeast end. The barn contains doorways and windows with chamfered surrounds; one doorway has a round-arched had, and others have elliptical heads.	II*
Stainton Hall; 53.97090°N 2.17387°W		17th century	This consists of a cottage attached to a house dating from the mid-19th century, and a coach house of 1842. They are in stone with stone slate roof, the house to the left has three storeys and three bays, the cottage has two storeys and a single bay, and the coach house has two storeys. The house has a doorway with a moulded cornice, bay windows, and a round-headed stair window, and the other windows are a mix of sashes and casements. The cottage has double-chamfered mullioned windows with hood moulds, and a round-arched stair window. The entrances to the coach house have rusticated surrounds, the windows are casements with plain surrounds, and over the doorway is a dated and inscribed plaque.	II
Old Farm Farmhouse; 53.97391°N 2.16703°W	—	Late 17th century (probable)	The farmhouse is in whitewashed stone with a stone slate roof. There are two storeys and two bays. The windows are double chamfered and mullioned, with four lights in the ground floor and three in the upper floor. The entry has been moved to the right gable end, and there is an added doorway on the left side of the front with a flat stone hood on consoles.	II
Cross Gates Farmhouse; 53.97293°N 2.13836°W	—	Late 17th century (probable)	The farmhouse is in stone, with a string course and a stone slate roof, two storeys and two bays. The entry is on the right side, with a lean-to porch and a doorway with a plain surround, and the windows are double-chamfered and mullioned.	II
Barn opposite Old Farm Farmhouse; 53.97355°N 2.16689°W	—	Late 17th or early 18th century	The barn is in stone with a stone slate roof. There are two storeys and seven bays, and an aisle on the east side. The openings include doorways with chamfered surrounds.	II
Bridge No. 164; 53.96856°N 2.13555°W		c. 1790	An accommodation bridge over the Leeds and Liverpool Canal. It is in stone, and consists of a single elliptical arch with rusticated voussoirs, a band, and a solid parapet with curved abutments.	II
Bridge No. 165; 53.97151°N 2.13531°W		c. 1790	A roving bridge carrying a road over the Leeds and Liverpool Canal. It is in stone, and consists of a single segmental arch with rusticated voussoirs, a band, and a solid parapet with curved abutments.	II
Bank Newton 1st lock 53.97235°N 2.13677°W		c. 1790	The lock on the Leeds and Liverpool Canal, is in sandstone, and is rebated at the ends for the wooden gates. The coping is ramped, and sweeps out to the basin at the lower end.	II
Bank Newton 2nd lock and bridge No. 166; 53.97373°N 2.13663°W		c. 1790	The lock on the Leeds and Liverpool Canal, is in sandstone, and is rebated at the ends for the wooden gates. The coping sweeps out to the basin at the lower end, where it is crossed by an accommodation bridge in stone. This consists of a single segmental arch, with parapets that come to a point in the centre.	II
Bank Newton 3rd lock 53.97462°N 2.13583°W		c. 1790	The lock on the Leeds and Liverpool Canal, is in sandstone, and is rebated at the ends for the wooden gates. The coping is ramped, and sweeps out to the basin at the lower end.	II
Bank Newton 4th lock 53.97533°N 2.13504°W		c. 1790	The lock on the Leeds and Liverpool Canal, is in sandstone, and is rebated at the ends for the wooden gates. The coping is ramped, and sweeps out to the basin at the lower end.	II
Bank Newton 5th lock and bridge No. 167; 53.97573°N 2.13382°W		c. 1790	The lock on the Leeds and Liverpool Canal, is in sandstone, and is rebated at the ends for the wooden gates. The coping sweeps out to the basin at the lower end, where it is crossed by a bridge in stone. This consists of a single segmental arch, with parapets that come to a point in the centre.	II
Bank Newton 6th lock 53.97645°N 2.13246°W		c. 1790	The lock on the Leeds and Liverpool Canal, is in sandstone, and is rebated at the ends for the wooden gates. The coping is ramped, and sweeps out to the basin at the lower end.	II
Newton Grange Farmhouse; 53.96777°N 2.13495°W		Early 19th century (probable)	A stone house with a hipped stone slate roof. There are two storeys, and a symmetrical front of three bays. In the ground floor are three blind round arches, and a central doorway with an architrave and a cornice. The windows are sashes, and in the left return is a tripartite window with a tympanum.	II
