= Listed buildings in Broughton, west North Yorkshire =

Broughton is a civil parish in the county of North Yorkshire, England. It contains 26 listed buildings that are recorded in the National Heritage List for England. Of these, two are listed at Grade I, the highest of the three grades, and the others are at Grade II, the lowest grade. The parish contains the village of Broughton and the surrounding area. The most important buildings in the parish are a church and Broughton Hall, a country house, both of which are listed, together with structures associated with Broughton Hall in its gardens and grounds. The other listed buildings include a boundary stone, a former cotton mill, a public house and a milepost.

== Key ==
Grade	Criteria
I	Buildings of exceptional interest, sometimes considered to be internationally important
II	Buildings of national importance and special interest

== Buildings ==
Name and location	Photograph	Date	Notes	Grade
All Saints' Church; 53.94935°N 2.10194°W		Early 16th century (possible)	The church, which incorporates earlier material, is in stone with a stone slate roof. It consists of a nave and a chancel under a continuous roof, a north aisle, a south porch and a west tower, and is in Perpendicular style. The tower has angle buttresses, arched bell openings, gargoyles, and an embattled parapet with corner pinnacles. The south doorway is Norman, with one order of waterleaf capitals and the shafts lost. In the south wall of the chancel is a round-headed priest's door, and the east window has three cusped traceried lights.	I
Broughton Hall; 53.95374°N 2.08849°W		1597	A country house that has been altered and extended, especially in 1809–11 by William Atkinson and in 1838–41 by George Webster, and a conservatory was added in 1853–55. The house is in stone with roofs of lead and slate. The main block has two storeys, a basement and attics, and seven bays, flanked by two-story projecting wings. In the centre is a porte-cochère with two pairs of Greek Ionic columns and a balustrade, and a doorway with a pediment on consoles. The windows are sashes, those in the ground floor and attic with cornices, and the attic is balustraded. The wings have Ionic half-columns and pediments. To the west is a service wing with two storeys, ending in a square four-stage tower surmounted by an octagonal cupola. At the rear is the conservatory, with Ionic columns outside and cast iron columns within, and a simple five-bay chapel.	I
Boundary stone at SD 9507 5259; 53.96925°N 2.07618°W	—	1698	The boundary stone is in millstone grit, and is inscribed with "T" on the east side and "ST" on the west side.	II
Pinetum Barn, Broughton Hall; 53.95261°N 2.08859°W	—	1701	The barn is in stone with a stone slate roof. It contains blocked segmental-arched cart entrances, one with a dated keystone, and quatrefoil vents.	II
Broughton Mill; 53.95448°N 2.09578°W	—	Late 18th century	The cotton mill, later converted into offices, is in stone with a stone slate roof and four storeys. It contains a semicircular-arched cart entrance, some of the windows are mullioned with three lights, and others are square single lights. On the west gable end is an inscribed and dated sundial, and an oeil-de-boeuf with a vermiculated surround.	II
Bull Inn; 53.95620°N 2.08773°W		Late 18th century (probable)	The public house is in stone with a stone slate roof. There are two storeys, and the south front has five bays, the outer bays gabled. The windows are recessed with square mullions and three lights, the middle lights horizontally-sliding sashes.	II
Primrose House; 53.95193°N 2.09362°W	—	Late 18th century	The house is in stone with a stone slate roof. There are two storeys and three bays. The central doorway has a pediment, above it is a sash window, and the other windows are mullioned and slightly stepped, with three lights.	II
Coach House, Broughton Hall; 53.95300°N 2.08974°W	—	1787	The coach house and stables, later used for other purposes, are in stone with a hipped slate roof. There are two storeys, and a U-shaped plan with three ranges round a yard, the north range with seven bays. In the centre is a round-headed rusticated archway, above which is a circular window and two discs under an open pediment. The end bays have full pediments and two tiers of Diocletian windows.	II
Sawmill, Broughton Hall; 53.95231°N 2.08825°W	—	1816	The sawmill is in stone with a stone slate roof. At the rear is an open sawpit, and at the front are three round arches with voussoirs and an initialled datestone. The windows are fixed.	II
Shippons, Home Farm; 53.95214°N 2.08812°W	—	Early 19th century	The shippons are in stone with stone slate roofs. They form a U-shaped plan with three separate roofs. The windows and doors have plain surrounds.	II
Carthouse south of shippons, Home Farm; 53.95182°N 2.08833°W	—	Early 19th century	The carthouse is in stone with a stone slate roof. There are four round-headed arches on the east side, and the other walls are solid.	II
Carthouse southeast of shippons, Home Farm; 53.95190°N 2.08793°W	—	Early 19th century	The carthouse is in stone with a stone slate roof. There are three archways to the west and one to the north, the west arches merging into columns without caps.	II
Hay barn south of shippons, Home Farm; 53.95184°N 2.08809°W	—	Early 19th century	The barn is in stone with a stone slate roof and five bays. There are columns on the south side and piers on the north side. The end walls are solid.	II
The Manse; 53.95280°N 2.09298°W	—	Early 19th century (probable)	The house is in stone with a stone slate roof, two storeys and three bays. The doorway has a round-arched head, and the windows are sashes. At the rear is a closet tower.	II
East Lodge; 53.95837°N 2.07262°W		1839	The lodge, designed by George Webster, is in stone with a slate roof and pedimented gables. There is a single storey and a cruciform plan, and facing the drive is an Ionic distyle in antis portico. On the corners of the lodge are panelled pilasters, and the windows are sashes with shouldered architraves.	II
Entrance screen, East Lodge; 53.95844°N 2.07242°W		1839	The gates, piers and wing walls were designed by George Webster. The piers are in stone, the gates and the end piers have channelled rustication. The gate piers also have tapering panels surmounted by pediments, on which are carved gryphonic heads, and are flanked by dwarf walls with rock-faced intermediate piers. The gates and railings are in cast iron and have spear finials.	II
Middle Lodge, gate piers and gates 53.95538°N 2.08450°W		1839 (probable)	The lodge, designed by George Webster, is in stone with boarded eaves and a slate roof. There is a single storey, and a cross-wing facing the drive containing a doorway and a gabled porch with coupled Doric pilasters. The windows are casements with chamfered surrounds. The gate piers are square and rock-faced and surmounted by lanterns, and the gates are in iron with a florid design.	II
Milepost; 53.95164°N 2.10681°W		19th century	The milepost on the north side of the A59 road is in iron, and has a triangular plan and a curved top. On the top is inscribed "SKIPTON & CLITHEROE ROAD" and "BROUGHTON", on the left side is the distance to Skipton and on the right side the distance to Clitheroe.	II
Game Larder, Broughton Hall; 53.95312°N 2.08929°W	—	1855	The game larder is in rock-faced stone, and has a slate roof with steep gables and ornamental bargeboards. It has a rectangular plan, it is in Gothic style, and the openings are double-chamfered. On the roof is an octagonal wooden louvre with a lead flèche.	II
Garden pavilion and wall, Broughton Hall; 53.95410°N 2.08782°W		1855	The pavilion at the northeast corner of the garden is in stone, and has a lead pyramidal roof with an iron finial and antefixae. There are clasping Doric pilasters and a modillion cornice, and on each side is a round-headed arch with a moulded archivolt and a monogram in the spandrels. The wall extends along the north side of the garden.	II
North terrace wall, Broughton Hall; 53.95402°N 2.08806°W	—	c. 1855	The low retaining wall is in rock-faced stone. It is canted out in the central section, and punctuated by short piers on which stand urns, some of which are in cast iron.	II
Statue by garden pavilion, Broughton Hall; 53.95403°N 2.08776°W	—	1855	The statue is in stone. It has a square base, and depicts a standing figure in Classical dress holding a garland of flowers.	II
Walls, steps and fountain, Broughton Hall; 53.95360°N 2.08800°W	—	1855	The garden, designed by W. A. Nesfield, is enclosed by walls with urns at intervals, containing two flights of stone steps. The west flight is simple, and the east flight is double and accommodates a fountain with a clam shell and dolphins.	II
West Lodge, screen wall and gate piers 53.95416°N 2.09249°W		1855	The lodge is in stone with a roof of decorative blue slate. It is in Tudor style, and has two bays facing the drive with differently shaped gables. Between them is a Tudor doorway with a canopy, flanked by chamfered mullioned windows. In the upper floor are a rectangular bay window and a triangular oriel window, and on the right return is a plaque with a coat of arms. The attached screen wall has gableted panelled piers with shields, and cast iron Gothic railings.	II
Gate piers and gates on the drive to West Lodge; 53.95365°N 2.09009°W	—	c. 1855	The two piers are in stone, and have a complex plan and octagonal caps. The gates are in wrought iron and are in a florid design.	II
Entrance screen, West Lodge; 53.95430°N 2.09232°W		c. 1865	Flanking the entrance to the drive are stone gate piers with panels and gablets, and outside them are low quadrant walls with moulded coping and railings. The gates and railings are in cast iron.	II
