= Eleanor Blanche Tempest =

English local and family historian (1853–1928)

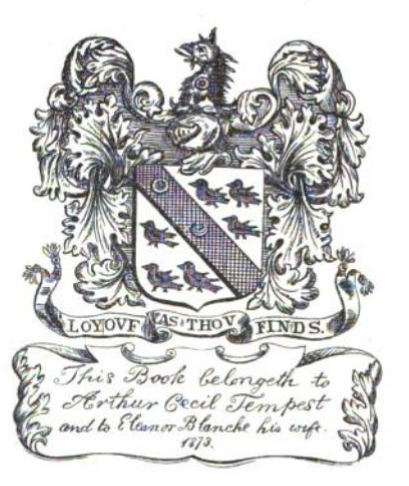
Bookplate of Arthur and Eleanor Blanche Tempest, with the Tempest family crest

Eleanor Blanche Tempest (née Reynard, 1853–1928) was an English local historian, palaeographer, archivist, and genealogist. She collected and preserved local archives and pedigrees in the north of England, especially pertaining to the Tempest family and its estates. A contributor to several history journals, she transcribed the parish register of Coleby, North Kesteven for the Parish Record Society and was a founding member of the Lincoln Record Society.

== Early life and family ==
She was born Eleanor Blanche Reynard in 1853, the second daughter of Edward Horner Reynard and his wife Elizabeth, née Mason. On 28 April 1873 she married Major Arthur Cecil Tempest. She was confirmed into the Roman Catholic Church two months later. They lived at Broughton Hall, Skipton and had two children, Blanche Cecil and Roger Stephen Tempest.

== Antiquarian activities ==
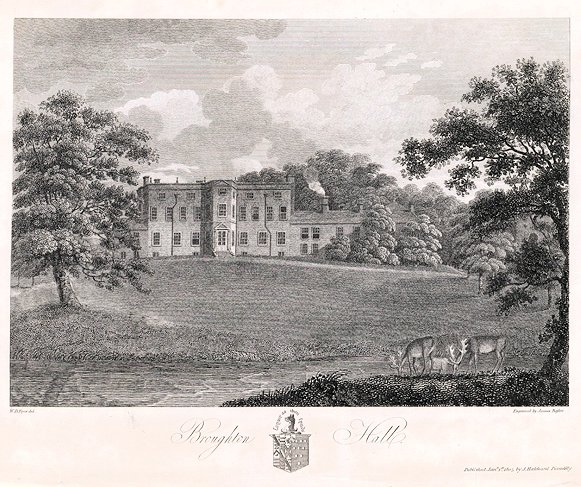
Broughton Hall in the early 19th century

Tempest began her historical enquiries by preserving documents she found at Broughton Hall in 1884. She published on these in the Transactions of the Historic Society of Lancashire and Cheshire, where she had become a life member in 1887.

When her brother-in-law died in 1894, Tempest and her husband moved to the family estate of Coleby, Lincolnshire. There, Tempest managed the estate accounts and organised the archives. She collected records relating to the Broughton estate by purchase, exchange or searching the collections of other manor houses.

She researched the Tempest family and produced an annotated pedigree, which was used as the basis for the entry in Burke’s Landed Gentry and published in The Bradford Antiquary in 1910 and 1914–6.

== Later life ==
In 1920, her husband died and she went to live on her brother’s estate at Markington, where she began researching the charters of the Ingilby family at Ripley Castle.

She died in 1928.
