= Broughton, west North Yorkshire =

Village and civil parish in North Yorkshire, England

Coordinates: 53°57′25″N 02°05′23″W

Broughton
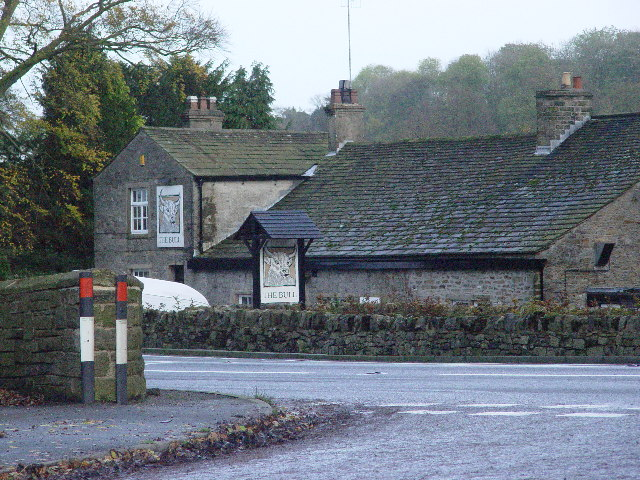
- The Bull at Broughton

- Location within North Yorkshire
- Population: 172 (2011 Census)
- OS grid reference: SD943511
  - London: 190 mi (310 km) SSE
- Civil parish: Broughton
- Unitary authority: North Yorkshire
- Ceremonial county: North Yorkshire
- Region: Yorkshire and the Humber
- Country: England
- Sovereign state: United Kingdom
- Post town: Skipton
- Postcode district: BD23
- Police: North Yorkshire
- Fire: North Yorkshire
- Ambulance: Yorkshire
- UK Parliament: Skipton and Ripon

Broughton is a village and civil parish in the county of North Yorkshire, England. The village is on the A59 road approximately 3 miles (5 km) west of Skipton.

The 2001 Census recorded a parish population of 81 increasing to 172 at the 2011 Census.

Until 1974 it was part of the West Riding of Yorkshire. From 1974 to 2023 it was part of the Craven District, it is now administered by the unitary North Yorkshire Council.

The name Broughton derives from the Old English brōctūn meaning 'settlement by a brook'.

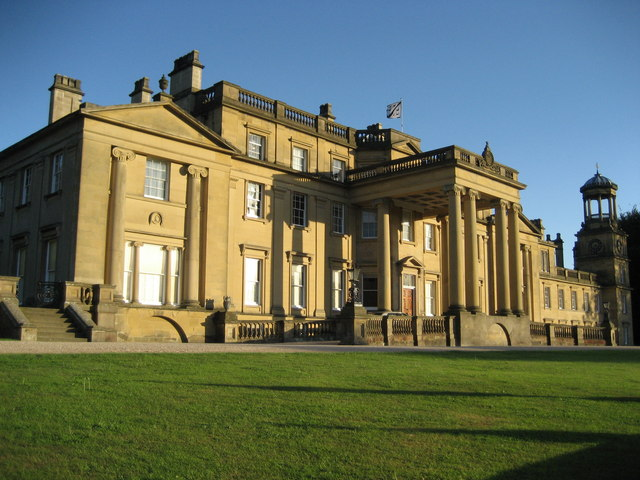
Broughton Hall

Broughton Hall is a Georgian country house centrally located in 3,000 acres (1,214 ha) of landscaped grounds. The hall is a Grade I listed building. All Saints' Church, Broughton, is also a Grade I listed building, which largely dates from the early 16th century.

== See also ==
- Listed buildings in Broughton, west North Yorkshire
- List of works by George Webster
