= Broughton Hall, North Yorkshire =

Country house in North Yorkshire, England

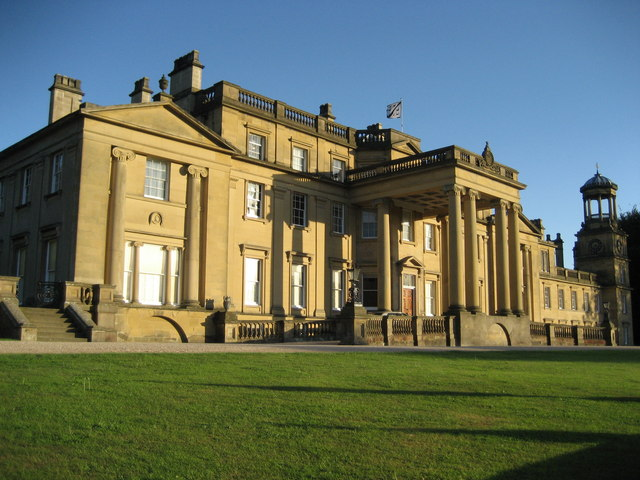
Broughton Hall, in 2007

Broughton Hall is a Georgian country house in Broughton, Craven, North Yorkshire, England, centrally located in 3,000 acres (1,214 ha) of landscaped grounds.

== History ==
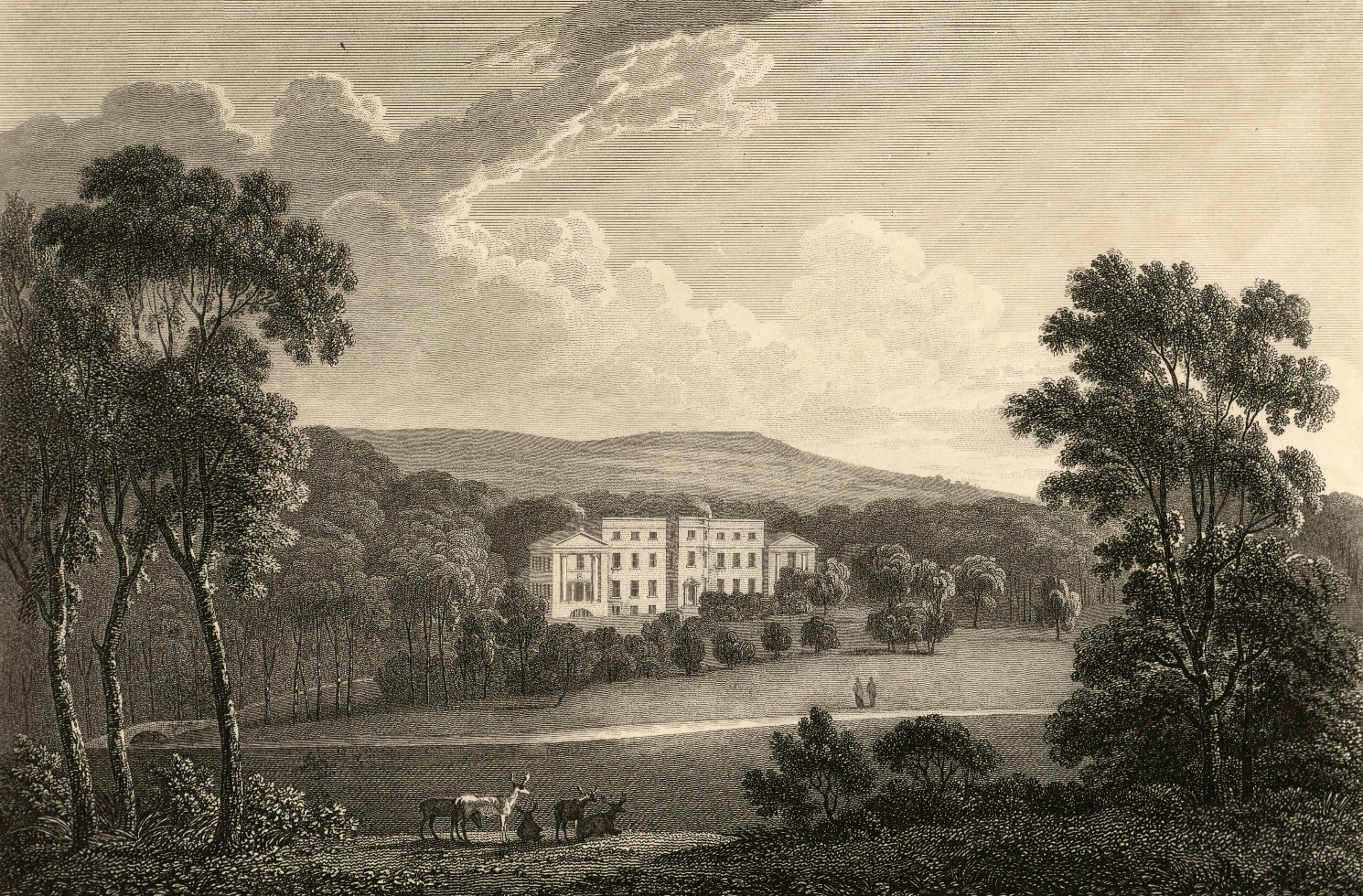
The hall, in the early 19th century

The hall is a Grade I listed building and has been the seat of the Tempest Baronets for 900 years and, although the baronetcy is extinct, the estate is still run by a direct descendant of the Tempest family. A 14th-century document records the acquisition of a house, watermill and part of the manor of Broughton by Sir John Tempest. The oldest parts of the current building date to 1597, and it was altered in 1755. The pedimented end wings were added to the main structure for Stephen Tempest, 1809–11, to designs by William Atkinson. Sir Charles Tempest, Bt. (1794–1865) refaced the north front in golden Kendal stone and added a portico, 1838–41, to designs by George Webster, an architect of the dynasty of masons at Kendal (Cumbria). A conservatory was added in 1853. The park was landscaped in the 18th and 19th centuries and the Italianate terraced garden designed by William Andrews Nesfield c. 1855. Eleanor Blanche Tempest, who lived in the hall from 1873–1894, preserved and expanded the records of the estate.

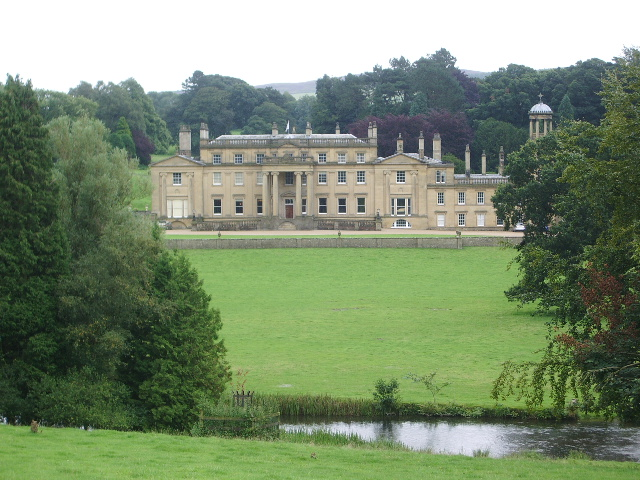
View of the hall across the grounds

The hall grounds house a business park, with more than 50 companies employing more than 700 people.

== Architecture ==
The house is built of stone with roofs of lead and slate. The main block has two storeys, a basement and attics, and seven bays, flanked by two-story projecting wings. In the centre is a porte-cochère with two pairs of Greek Ionic columns and a balustrade, and a doorway with a pediment on consoles. The windows are sashes, those in the ground floor and attic with cornices, and the attic is balustraded. The wings have Ionic half-columns and pediments. To the west is a service wing with two storeys, ending in a square four-stage tower surmounted by an octagonal cupola. At the rear is the conservatory, with Ionic columns outside and cast iron columns within, and a simple five-bay chapel.

The interior of the house is almost entirely the work of Atkinson, the exceptions being the south room on the first floor, with small panels which may date from 1597; the 17th century back stair; and the transverse hall which may also be original. Much of Atkinson's work is Neoclassical, including the library, dining room, white and red drawing rooms, and the vestibule with staircase. The Chapel of the Sacred Heart is neo-Gothic.

== In film and television ==
The Hall stands in as Fairley Hall in both the 1985 and 2026 television adaptation of Barbara Taylor Bradford's 1979 novel A Woman of Substance, both created for Channel 4.

Broughton Hall was used as Norland Park, the home of Elinor, Marianne, and Mrs. Dashwood before they are forced to move, in the 2008 television adaptation of Sense and Sensibility.

In 2019, the Hall was used for filming some scenes for the first series of All Creatures Great and Small. The property was depicted as the home of the fictional Mrs. Pumphrey, owner of Tricki-Woo, a character based on socialite Marjorie Warner who was a client of James Herriot and actually lived at Thorpe House near Thirsk.

Other productions have also filmed some scenes at the Hall, including the 2021 BBC One drama Ridley Road.

== See also ==
- Grade I listed buildings in North Yorkshire (district)
- Listed buildings in Broughton, west North Yorkshire
