= Tempest family =

English recusant family

Arms of Tempest of Broughton: Argent, a bend engrailed between six martlets sable

The Tempest family was an English recusant family that originated in western Yorkshire (part of which is now eastern Lancashire) in the 12th century.

== Tempest baronets of Stella and Stanley, County Durham ==
A branch of the Tempest family of Holmside, County Durham descended from Nicolas Tempest (1486–1539), described as of Stanley Byers and Stanley Parke, the fourth son of Robert Tempest and Anne Lambton of Holmside. The Tyneside branch of the family at Stella combined agricultural and mercantile interests with large-scale involvement in the coal trade via Newcastle upon Tyne in the late 16th and 17th centuries, with many members being noted recusants, adherents to the old Catholic faith after the Reformation.

Thomas Tempest (1530–1578) was the son of the above; he married Elizabeth Place of Halnaby, Yorkshire and was of Stanley. His eldest son: Sir Nicolas Tempest, 1st Baronet (1553–1625). He was created a baronet on 23 December 1622 by James I, then being described as of Stella Hall, Blaydon, County Durham, a former monastic property granted to the family by Elizabeth I c1600. Surtees suggests that the "Tempests resided here in catholic splendour and loyalty during the reign of four Stuart kings" indicating a steadfast adherence to the Roman Catholic faith at Stella during the whole of the 17th century.

Bishop Toby Matthew of Durham described Tempest as "as much a church papist as any in England", although this may have been due to the influence of his wife, Isabel Lambton (1552–1623). Arrested and committed to Durham gaol as a recusant in 1599 the Bishop's attempts at prosecution were thwarted by the intervention of Lord Eure, her uncle, and a member of the Council of the North prompting him to write that "nothing in Newcastle can prevail against him (Tempest), he being in affinity and consanguinity with both factions there". The hostility of the bishops persisted until Tempest's death in 1625 preventing him from taking post as Sheriff of Newcastle and as a JP on the Durham bench. He was apprenticed to Cuthbert Musgrave, Boothman, of Newcastle in 1560.

Sir Thomas Tempest, 2nd Baronet (c. 1581–1641). He was the eldest son of the above; he married Troth Tempest (1596-16??), daughter of Sir Richard Tempest Kt. of Bracewell, Yorkshire, a distant relative. He appears to have convinced Bishop Neile of Durham of his Protestantism and appeared as JP and Master of the Muster for the Chester-le-Street ward of Durham. He and his brother Henry were confirmed non-recusants by the ecclesiastical commissioners in 1630 when compounding on behalf of Dionysia Bulmer upon her conviction.

Sir Richard Tempest, 3rd Baronet (1619–1662). He was the eldest son of the above; he was a leading Royalist during the Civil War. A lawyer, he was admitted to Lincolns Inn in 1636. As Colonel of a Regiment of Horse under Marmaduke Langdale in 1648, he was captured by Robert Lilburne in the action at Cartington Castle, Northumberland but contrived to escape after breakfast. He spent some time in exile in France and the Stella estate suffered sequestration. This was discharged in 1652 and the property conveyed to his unmarried uncle Henry. He married Sarah Campbell, daughter of the Lord Mayor of London, in 1641.

Sir Thomas Tempest, 4th Baronet (1642–1691), eldest son of the above. Educated at the English College, Douai. He married twice, firstly to Elizabeth Braithwaite (1637–1669) of Warcop, Cumbria and, after his first wife's death, secondly in 1677 to Alice Hodgson (1641–1685). Following his second marriage he openly adopted the Catholic faith, being charged with absenting himself from the parish church. A Catholic priest, Fr. John Bennet (OSB), was established at Stella effective 1688. Sir Thomas established a library of religious books to be found in the Harlien collection of the British Library and at Ushaw College.

Sir Francis Tempest, 5th Baronet (1678–1698). He was the only son of the above. Educated at Jesuit College of St. Louis le Grand Paris. Died young at Montpelier and was succeeded by his father's cousin.

Sir Nicolas Tempest, 6th Baronet (1664–1742). He inherited the title but not the estates of Stella which passed to Jane Tempest, sister of the above and wife of William Widdrington, 4th Baron Widdrington, who was attainted for his part in the 1715 Jacobite rising. He married Ann Price. He is interred at Tanfield, Durham.

Arms Argent a bend engrailed between six martlets Sable. Crest on a wreath a martlet Sable

== Tempest of Old Durham and Wynyard ==
A branch of the Tempest family of Stella Hall, Blaydon, County Durham, descended from Rowland Tempest, third son of Thomas Tempest, and his wife, Elizabeth, and brother to Sir Nicolas Tempest (1553–1625), 1st Baronet of Stella. Successive members engaged political careers representing the county or City of Durham from 1675 until 1813.

Rowland Tempest was a merchant and hostman (or fitter) of Newcastle, involved in the shipment of coal. The records of the Hostman's Company list the volume of trade in 1602 as 9,085 tons in 85 keels, of which Rowland ships 250 in 1.5.M. He married Barbara, daughter of Thomas Calverley of Littlebourne, Durham, sister of Sir John Calverley Kt.

Sir Thomas Tempest Kt. (1594-died after 1652), eldest son of the above was a Durham lawyer. Educated Queens College, matric. 23 November 1610, aged 16. Barrister at Law, Lincoln's Inn 1620, a bencher 1636. He acted as Attorney General of the Bishopric of Durham (c. 1634–1640) and in October 1640 as Attorney-General for Ireland in succession to Sir Richard Osbaldeston when he described is as a Recorder, of Lincoln's Inn. He was knighted at Dublin in December, the same year.

In County Durham he purchased the manors of The Isle, south west of Bradbury (1635) and Swainston, north of Wynyard and Embleton, from his Calverley and Bulmer relatives (1628). He married, firstly, in 1620, his distant relative, Eleanor Tempest, (Note: It is likely Eleanor was a Catholic. Her father had presented scholarships to the College of Douai training centre for seminary priests who risked their lives on English missions. Two Robert Tempests, her uncle and cousin may have been such in 1625 and 1640 whilst her aunt Anne was fined as a recusant in 1577 and 1620.) daughter of William Tempest and Eizabeth More of Sommerton, Oxfordshire (Note: One outlying farm Troy Farm possessing a well preserved turf maze dates from the 16th century and was probably built on the site of the manor house known as Sommerton occupied in the 16th century by William Tempest (Victoria County History of Oxford).) and secondly in 1633 Elizabeth widow of Robert Crewes of Soper Lane, St. Pancras. His brother Francis is listed as Barrister at Law, Gray's Inn and was Recorder of Durham 1642.

John Tempest (1623–1697), only son of the above. Born in Oxford, educated at The Queen's College, Oxford, matriculated 17 November 1637, aged 14. Styled of The Isle and, in right of his wife Elizabeth, daughter and heiress of John Heath, of Old Durham.

A leading Royalist, during the Civil War he commanded a Regiment of Foot in the Marquess of Newcastle's army. During 1644 his regiment fought at Northallerton, where its Lt. Colonel Gerard Salvin was killed and in July at Marston Moor where the royalist cause in the north was irretrievably lost. Retreating into Lancashire with the remnants of Prince Rupert's forces he joined the small band of volunteers defending Lathom House, home of the Earl of Derby. Despite fierce resistance this was forced to capitulate December 1645 with the defenders allowed to march to the nearest friendly forces. John Tempest occurs as Governor and defender of Skipton Castle which surrendered to Parliament 21 December 1645. (Note: This was the second siege. The house was eventually captured by the Roundhead General Egerton on 6 December 1645)

Labeled an "obstinate delinquent" by the Parliamentary Commissioners alongside his father and father-in-law who compounded for their estates in 1647. He himself did so in 1649. With his cousin, Sir Richard Tempest Bt. of Stella, he took part in the second Civil War and is listed among the prisoners following the action at Cartington Castle, Northumberland in 1648. (Note: He or his cousin Sir Richard may be the Colonel Tempest surprised and captured with a party of Royalist horse at Whalley near Clitheroe prior to the Battle of Preston later that year)

During the Commonwealth, in 1656 he is mentioned by Marmaduke Langdale as among those Cavaliers of the Bishopric whom he deems "eminently reliable" and conversely by Cromwell's agents as the "leader of a cabal whose members include Col. Ralph Millot and William Davison". After the restoration of Charles II he was nominated a Knight of the Royal Oak in 1661, the order being "set aside for fear of inciting the heats and jealousies of the late times". In October 1662 he was appointed by John Cosin, Bishop of Durham, as a Deputy Lord Lieutenant and Receiver for County Durham, he seems already to have been Colonel of the Train Bands as on 17 September 1662 he is ordered by the Bishop to "search houses and arrest George Lilburne and Thomas Brown of Sunderland". The former was Mayor of Sunderland and brother of the Parliamentarian, General Robert Lilburne of Thickley, the most powerful man in Durham in the 1650s.

From 1666, along with other Durham freeholders, Tempest petitioned for representation for the county, as distinct from the City, of Durham in Parliament, a privilege steadfastly opposed by the Bishop. A successful bill was eventually brought and on 21 June 1675 after a three-day election, John Tempest was declared elected as the first Member of Parliament for the County. An anonymous libel on the Earl of Danby's organisation published in 1677 observes that "John Tempest a papist, a pensioner and a court dinner man hath secured a customers place at Hull for his son". (Note: 20 January 1675 – Grant for John Tempest and Rowland Tempest, sons of Colonel John Tempest to be Customers of Hull port in reversion after Sir Matthew Appleyard and Thomas Lyons. 29 May 1688 – Royal Warrant to the Attorney General constituting Rowland Tempest and John Tempest to customers of Hull in place of Matthew Appleyard. They claim the office by a grant from Charles II dated 1 May 1676 (Calendar of State Papers, 1676).)

He was returned again in the election of 1678. On 17 January 1678 he is appointed as Newcastle Commissioner for sea coals and on 21 March the same year receives a grant of searcher of the port. In 1680 he and his son William Tempest sold The Isle to William Bigg. In 1680 and 1683 he is listed as a witness as to the Roundhead sympathies of John Blakiston of Newcastle and a JP, son of the regicide John Blakiston.

In 1683 he and William Tempest purchased the manor of Little Hutton near Hutton Magna (Gilling West Wapentake) Yorkshire from the Edens. In July 1688 he is reappointed as Deputy Lord Lieutenant of Durham with his son William. He was buried at Forcett, North Yorkshire, on 26 July 1697, his daughter Margaret having married Richard Shuttleworth of Forcett and Gawthorpe Hall (Lancashire)

William Tempest (31 January 1653 – 16 March 1700), second son of John Tempest of The Isle and Old Durham and Elizabeth daughter and sole heiress of John Heath, represented the City of Durham as Member of Parliament in 1678, 1680 and 1689. [2] He was a defeated candidate in the elections of 1675, (Note: Tempest polled more votes than the successful candidate John Parkhurst but upon scrutiny it was discovered that 12 of Mr. Tempest's voters were not freemen and that 3 had voted twice (Surtees, Robert. History of Durham, Vol I, Appendix cl)) 1679 and 1688. [3]. Styled Colonel Tempest in 1694, an adherent to the Country Interest. He may have been implicated in the conspiracy of John Fenwick against William III, being recorded as under house arrest at his home of Old Durham, 19 March 1695. In 1677 he married Elizabeth Sudbury, niece of the Dean of Durham and sister of Sir John Sudbury Bt. of Eldon, County Durham.

John Tempest (1679–1737), eldest son of the above was elected as the Member of Parliament for the County of Durham in 1705. [5]. He married Jane, daughter and heiress of Richard Wharton of Durham, bringing to the family extensive properties in the Houghton-le-Spring and Penshaw areas and significantly expanding the family's coal mining interests through the lease of the collieries at Rainton from the Dean and Chapter.

John Tempest (23 April 1710 – 17 May 1776 of Sherburn and Wynyard, County Durham, was a landowner and Member of Parliament, the eldest son of John Tempest (1679–1737) and Jane Wharton (1683–1736). His family's extensive landed interests including the manors of Wynyard (purchased in 1742 for £8,000), The Isle, Swainston, Kelloe, Dalton-le-Dale, Old Durham, Sherburn, Brancepeth Castle, Stainton, Thorpe Thewles, Carlton, Redmarshall, Broomhall, Offerton. South Biddick, Rainton and Sunderland, helped make them among the largest shippers of coal via Sunderland. In 1758, from the Rainton coalfield, 20866 chaldrons of coal were shipped abroad (a chaldron weighed two tons 13 hundredweight). He represented the City of Durham in the Parliaments of 1741 (elected 3 April 1742), when he is listed among those voting against Hanoverian troops being taken into British pay, 1747, 1754 and 1761. He married (at Kirk Merrington, 9 May 1738) to Frances Shuttleworth (17??–1771).

John Tempest Jr. (1739 – 12 August 1794) was a County Durham landowner, Tory politician and Member of Parliament. A member of the Old Durham branch of the Tempest family, Tempest was born in Sherburn (Durham), the son of John Tempest of Wynyard (1710–1776) and Frances Shuttleworth. He represented the City of Durham in the Parliaments of 1768, 1774, 1780, 1784 and 1790, and joined his fellow Durham M.P. John Lambton in constantly opposing the administration of Lord North.

He married Ann Townsend (17??–1817), daughter of Joseph Townsend of Honington, Warwickshire. Their only son, John Wharton Tempest (1772–1793, the subject of a painting by George Romney), predeceased them as a result of a riding accident. (Note: He was injured whilst attempting to ride two horses at once in emulation of a circus trick and sustained a hematoma which proved fatal despite the attentions of the eminent surgeon John Hunter (quoted in The Noels and the Milbankes).) The Tempest estates were devolved to his sister's son Henry by the Rev. Sir Henry Vane Bt. of Long Newton upon condition that he assume the name and arms of Tempest. Sir Henry Vane-Tempest, 2nd Baronet (1771–1813), replaced his uncle as M.P. for Durham City, 17 October 1794, and was the ancestor of the Vane-Tempest-Stewarts, Earls Vane and Marquesses of Londonderry.

== Tempest baronets of Tong, Yorkshire ==
Created 25 May 1664 in the Baronetcy of England for John Tempest.

- Sir John Tempest, 1st Baronet (1645–23 Jun 1693)
- Sir George Tempest, 2nd Baronet (22 May 1672–11 Oct 1745)
- Sir Henry Tempest, 3rd Baronet (1 Sep 1696–9 Nov 1753)
- Sir Henry Tempest, 4th Baronet (13 Jan 1753–29 Jan 1819) Baronetcy extinct on his death.

== Tempest baronet of Broughton Hall and Coleby (1841) ==
Created in 1841 in the Baronetcy of the UK for Sir Charles with seats at Broughton Hall and Coleby, Lincolnshire.

- Sir Charles Robert Tempest, 1st Baronet (21 April 1794 – 8 December 1865). Baronetcy extinct on his death, unmarried. His estates passed to his nephew, who was created a baronet in 1866.

== Tempest baronets of Heaton (1866) ==
Created 30 July 1866 in the Baronetcy of the UK for Sir Charles.

- Sir Charles Henry Tempest, 1st Baronet (5 January 1834 – 1 August 1894)
  - Henry Arthur Joseph Tempest (31 March 1863 – 16 April 1891)

As his only son predeceased him, the baronetcy became extinct upon his death, while his estates passed to his younger brother, Arthur Cecil Tempest (21 June 1837 – 21 June 1920). Arthur's wife Eleanor Blanche Tempest compiled a pedigree of the Tempest family and collected archives of its estates.

Broughton Hall passed down through the line to Henry Tempest, who ran the estate with his wife, Janet Tempest. The estate is now owned by their son, Roger Tempest.

== See also ==
- Mortlake Tapestry Works
