= Sarah Payne (prison governor) =

Sarah Payne CBE
- Occupation: Director of NOMS Wales
- Employer: National Offender Management Service

Sarah Payne CBE is the head of the National Offender Management Service in Wales, previously having worked as the chief executive of the Wales Probation Trust. Prior to her probation work, she was chief executive of the charity YWCA England and Wales. She was an area manager and a governor in HM Prison Service, having entered the service directly from university on a graduate scheme.

== Prison career ==
After graduating with a Modern Languages degree, Payne joined the HM Prison Service graduate scheme against the wishes of her parents. She had visited a prison while attending university, which she later described as a "lightbulb moment". She was first posted to HM Prison Holloway, a women's prison in London. She went on to become deputy governor at HM Prison Pentonville, a London-based men's establishment. From there she became governor at HM Prison Bullingdon and then HM Prison Oxford, before becoming the area manager for the Thames Valley region.

== Charity and Probation career ==
Payne left the Prison Service to become chief executive of YWCA England and Wales, a women and girl's charity that helps more than 11,000 people a year. In December 2010, she was named as the chief executive of the new Wales Probation Trust. The trust had been formed from a merger of the four smaller probation areas in Wales some eight months earlier.

When Transforming Rehabilitation plans were made under Justice Secretary Chris Grayling to reform the probation services to form a new National Probation Service (NPS) and create several privately run Community Rehabilitation Companies (CRCs), Payne was named as the director of the National Offender Management Service in Wales. Under this new role, she became responsible for the NPS in Wales and the public sector prisons within the geographical area, as well as overseeing the work of the privately run HM Prison Parc and the Wales CRC. She was named a Commander of the Order of the British Empire in the 2016 New Year Honours.
