= Transforming Rehabilitation =

Transforming Rehabilitation (TR) was the name given to a white paper issued by the UK Ministry of Justice in May 2013, and to a programme of work from 2013 to 2016 to enact the strategy outlined in the paper. TR is concerned with the supervision and rehabilitation of offenders in England and Wales.

== Background ==
During the early years of the United Kingdom coalition government (2010–2015), the supervision of rehabilitation of offenders in England and Wales was overseen by the National Offender Management Service with operational responsibilities divided between Her Majesty's Prison Service and private-sector prisons (for offenders in custody), and 35 Probation Trusts responsible for offenders in the community serving community orders or released on licence.

== Transforming Rehabilitation ==
Transforming Rehabilitation was the then Secretary of State for Justice, Chris Grayling's plan for the reform of the provision of services for offenders in the community, published in 2013 with a view to necessary legislation and reorganisation being put in place before the 2015 elections marking the end of the 2010-2015 parliament.

The plans laid in TR respond to an observation that despite increases in spending on offender rehabilitation, reoffending rates were not falling.

Major aspects of the transformation include:

- Splitting the provision of community services for offenders between a single public-sector National Probation Service (NPS), and a set of private-sector Commercial Rehabilitation Companies (CRCs) organised on the basis of 21 geographical areas with boundaries coterminous with (or which do not cut across) the boundaries of local authorities and Police and Crime Commissioners. Broadly, the NPS becomes responsible for the supervision of Medium and High Risk of Serious Harm offenders, whilst the CRCs are responsible for low and medium risk of serious harm offenders.
- Joined-up rehabilitative services across prisons and the community: CRCs assume responsibility for the rehabilitative aspects of the management of offenders in custody, with prisons being allocated to CRCs according to their geography.
- Mandatory and increased supervision of offenders on release from prison: whereas in the past, offenders released from custody after short (12 months or less) sentences received supervision only for the short period of their release licence, under TR all prisoners released from sentences of 3 months of more will be supervised for at least 12 months in the community, under their release licence and an additional supervision period for rehabilitation. Legislation was passed in the form of the Offender Rehabilitation Act 2014 to enable changes to the statutory basis for offender supervision to support the proposed reforms.
- Provision of flexibility: whereas in the period from circa 1999 onwards, prison and probation services had been following an evidence-based 'What Works" strategy, the white paper encourages a flexibility of approach by the private sector providers.
- Incentives for reducing reoffending: the contracts struck with private-sector providers include incentives based on payments for measurably reducing reoffendeing rates.

== NAO report ==
In April 2016, the National Audit Office, an independent body which scrutinises public spending, issued a report into the Transforming Rehabilitation process to date. The report was described as savaging the government's privatisation of probation services, asserting that the government lacks data on which to judge the performance of new private sector providers, and raising concerns that CRCs may be putting profit above public safety by failing to engage with classes of offenders, and may be manipulating or withholding data.
