= Eithne Birt, Lady Birt =

British businesswoman

The Right Honourable The Lady Birt CB
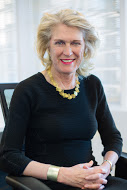

Personal details
- Born: Eithne Victoria Wallis; December 1952 (age 73)
- Spouse: John Birt (m. 2006)
- Children: 3
- Known for: Chair of Bluelight Global Solutions; Senior Adviser to Mastek UK; Managing director of the Government Division at Fujitsu

Eithne Victoria Birt, Baroness Birt, CB (née Wallis; born December 1952) is the former founding Director-General of the National Probation Service, and former managing director of the Government Division at Fujitsu.

== Education ==
Birt was educated at the High School in Northern Ireland (since amalgamated with the Royal School Dungannon) from 1964 to 1971, and was head girl from 1970 to 1971.

She undertook a year of VSO in the western part of Zambia before going to Manchester University in 1972 where she achieved a B.A. degree in Economics and subsequently an M.A. in Social Studies.

== Career ==
She began her career in probation as a Probation Officer appointed by the Greater Manchester Probation Service in 1979. She was then promoted to Assistant Chief Probation Officer by the Cambridgeshire Probation Service in 1989, to Deputy Chief Probation Officer by the Inner London Probation Service in 1993, and to Chief Probation Officer by the Oxfordshire & Buckinghamshire Probation Service in 1997.

Lady Birt was appointed the founding Director-General of the National Probation Service in 2001, when the service was created by the Criminal Justice and Court Services Act 2000. She was awarded the title of Companion of the Order of the Bath in Queen's Birthday Honours List in 2004 for her work for public services.

In 2005, she took the role of Director of the National Offender Management Service Change Programme, being succeeded in her previous role by Steve Murphy.

In July 2005, she became the managing director of the Government Division at Fujitsu. Contracts with the Home Office, Cabinet Office and Treasury followed. She oversaw the company when Fujitsu signed a contract with the Department for Work and Pensions to manage all its desktop computing in February 2010, the single biggest desktop and thin client outsourcing deal in the UK. She left this position at Fujitsu in 2011, having led the business through growth to £1b turnover.

In 2011 she joined MacQuarie owned Airwave Solutions Ltd, sitting as a NED on the Board and as a Senior Adviser to the business.

As of 2014, she had agreed to help Sir Richard Needham (former Minister for the Economy in Northern Ireland) to encourage creative engineering in the area.

She is currently Chair of Bluelight Global Solutions and a Senior Adviser to Mastek UK, having been involved in a range of businesses and charitable foundations. She is a patron of the Topsy Foundation, which helps those suffering from or affected by HIV and AIDS in African communities. She has also been a Member of the Sue Ryder hospice Thorpe Hall Appeal Board.

== Personal life ==
Birt and her present husband John Birt, Baron Birt were married in an Islington registry office in the presence of two witnesses in December 2006. Consequently, she became Baroness Birt by use of being married with him. Peter Mandelson and Cilla Black were among guests attending the wedding reception. Birt has three children from a previous marriage.

She is a supporter of diversity in the workplace, stating that "the achievement of diversity in the workplace is critical to its effectiveness, as well as being an ethical issue" and commenting that diversity targets are designed "to ensure that appropriate access and advancement was made available to all" in an interview with The Guardian.
