= Lionel Blackman =

English lawyer

Lionel Francis Blackman

Councillor for Woodcote, Epsom and Ewell

Senior Partner, Lionel Blackman & Co Solicitors
- In office 2005–2009

Personal details
- Born: Lionel Francis Blackman
- Party: Liberal Democrats (2005–2009); Independent (2015)
- Occupation: Solicitor advocate
- Known for: Director of the Solicitors' International Human Rights Group (SIHRG)

Lionel Francis Blackman is an English solicitor advocate and senior partner of an Epsom criminal litigation practice. He has written and co-authored investigative reports in civil and political human rights, and is the current Director of the Solicitors' International Human Rights Group (SIHRG), a group he co-founded in 2005 and chaired between 2009–15.

== Career ==
Blackman qualified as a lawyer in 1986, opening his own criminal defence practice three years later. He was among the first solicitors, along with Sir David Napley, to take part in higher court advocacy after the Courts and Legal Services Act 1990 was passed. In 1999 he was the second solicitor, after Laurence Collins of Herbert Smith LLP who represented the Chilean government against Pinochet in 1998, to appear and the first to lead and win a case in the Judicial Committee of the House of Lords (then the senior most court). He has been lead defence counsel in several homicide trials at the Old Bailey and elsewhere.

In December 2009 he defended Paul Clarke who was charged after handing in to the police a shotgun he found in his garden. Clarke was found guilty because strict liability applies to possession of a gun, intention is not important. Clarke received a twelve-month suspended sentence. The legal team made statements to and had meetings with influential parts of the media to highlight the then inflexibility of the law on illegal gun possession.

In October 2010 he submitted to the Chilcot Inquiry into the Legality of the War in Iraq a submission on the lack of a humanitarian justification for the intervention alongside other legal submissions from the Solicitors International Human Rights Group.

In November 2012 he authored a trial observation report on the politically controversial trial of opposition figure Vladimir Kozlov that took place in Aktau, Kazakhstan between August and October 2012.

In July 2015 his report on the trial of Egyptian civil society activist Alaa Abd El-Fattah was published ("the face of the Tahir Square revolution")

In March 2016 his report on the trial of two Myanmar migrant workers accused of the murders of David Miller and Hannah Witheridge on the Thai island of Koh Tao was issued. Several recommendations were made for improvements to the Thai criminal justice system.

In April 2019 his joint report on the trial of Egyptian rights activist Amal Fathy was launched at a press conference in the European Parliament.

In 2020 the Columbia Law School Human Rights Clinic in collaboration with TrialWatch and the Clooney Foundation for Justice Initiative published a report on the trial of two environmental activists in Thailand. Blackman was the expert contributor to the Report.

In 2021 his observation report on the mass trial in Turkey against the religious movement led by controversial figure Adnan Oktar was published.

His "Straightforward Guide for Criminal Trial Observers" is referenced in the FAIR TRIAL INDICATORS: Monitoring Conflict-Related Criminal Trials in Ukraine of the Asser Institute and has been translated into Turkish.

Blackman is a visiting fellow at London South Bank University in Criminal Litigation at Masters level and lectures internationally on various aspects of the English legal system and the use of high technology in criminal trials.

== Political activities ==
In 2005 Blackman was elected as a councillor in the ward of Woodcote, in Epsom and Ewell, representing the Liberal Democrats. He stood down in 2009.

At the 2010 general election he stood as that party's candidate for Westminster's Esher and Walton seat (one of eleven that are in Surrey). This has equated to a Conservative seat in Westminster for generations and Blackman attracted just under 25% of the vote.

Blackman stood as an independent candidate for the Epsom and Ewell constituency in Surrey in the 2015 General Election. His candidature drew attention to comments from the incumbent MP, Justice Secretary Chris Grayling, who stated that he wants to "scrap the Human Rights Act." This became a promised commitment in the Conservative Manifesto for the 2015 General Election. As a result, Blackman explained in an article for the Solicitors Journal, he felt compelled to stand against the Lord Chancellor as an independent candidate. Whilst the article chose the title "independent menace" he took 1.1% of the vote; Grayling took 58.3%.

== Human rights, humanitarian and other activities ==
In 2013 he founded the charity Harrop HR Missions Ltd that since 2022 has been the vehicle for Surrey Stands With Ukraine, a group that has raised over £5 million of aid for Ukraine.

In 2020 he established the charity The Friends of Horton Cemetery, the largest asylum cemetery in Europe and home to some 9000 former patients of the "Epsom cluster" of psychiatric hospitals. The cemetery was active between 1899 and 1955 and in 1983 was sold to property company Marque Securities. The purpose of the charity is to lobby for the cemetery's restoration to a form of community ownership and to document the life stories of those buried there.

In 2021 he founded and continues to direct The Epsom and Ewell Times and stated "Charity begins at home, so does accountability" when interviewed by the independent press regulator IMPRESS.

in 2022 he established the Epsom Jazz Club that hosts monthly jazz evenings featuring top national and international jazz artists. Blackman composes music. He is a Governor of the Yehudi Menuhin School of Music.

In 2023 together with Miriam Chinnappa he co-founded The Centre for Law and Transformative Change that undertakes international law reform and justice projects.
