= Sarah Payne =

Sarah Payne may refer to:

- Murder of Sarah Payne (1991–2000), high-profile child murder victim in the UK
- Sarah Payne (actress), British actress
- Sarah Payne (prison governor), British director of NOMS Wales

== See also ==
- Sara Payne (born 1969), mother of murder victim Sarah Payne
- Sarah C. Paine, professor of strategy and policy
