= Medomsley Detention Centre =

Former prison in Durham, England

Medomsley Detention Centre was a prison for young male offenders in the village of Medomsley, near Consett in Durham, England, from 1961 until the late 1980s.

More than 1,800 living former inmates have reported sexual and physical abuse by staff. Police believe many of the staff belonged to a child sex abuse ring. Seven former officers were jailed for abusing detainees, receiving sentences totalling nearly 34 years. Two were convicted of sexual offences in 1990, 2003 and 2005, while the other five were jailed for physical abuse in 2019.

== Context ==
Built in 1960 on what was once a Victorian orphanage, Medomsley Detention Centre was operated by the Home Office. It opened in February 1961 and closed in the late 1980s. It could accommodate up to 130 detainees though usually held around 70. These were mostly from northern England with some from Scotland. Inmates were males aged 17 to 21, and were typically there for their first offence and for a minor crime, the penalty for which would later be a non-custodial community sentence. Detention typically lasted six to eight weeks.

Medomsley was one of several prisons intended to separate youths from older criminals. Former inmates have since reported sexual, physical and emotional abuse, leading to addiction and suicide.

The site reopened as the private Hassockfield Secure Training Centre from 1999 to 2015. In June 2019, plans were proposed to redevelop the site for housing.

=== "Short, sharp shock" policy ===
The policy involved incarcerating boys convicted of minor misdemeanors in what have since been described as "sadistic, brutal concentration camps", where inmates were routinely humiliated and violently sexually assaulted. Inmates were routinely physically attacked for not saying "sir" when addressing a guard and were often forced to stand naked, visible to guards, for long periods of time. Margaret Thatcher's government argued the policy would deter further crime.

David Greenwood, a representative of child abuse victims in detention centres, said detainees only became law-abiding in a minority of cases he was aware of and "the majority have their lives sent down the other path with this kind of treatment, especially with sexual abuse as well." In 2014, North West Durham's MP, Pat Glass, criticised the phrase "short, sharp shock" because it created "a culture in which a group of people is seen as less than the rest", which is when "things start to go wrong". She said the abuse at Medomsley "cannot have been happening in isolation" and was part of a wider culture of abuse. Detective Adrian Green who led Operation Seabrook said Margaret Thatcher's severe "short, sharp shock" policy for punishing young offenders may have been used as a cover for abuse by Medomsley officers.

One bereaved relative, whose brother Mark turned to heroin and died of an overdose after being incarcerated for a crime he had not committed, in one such centre in Kent, where inmates "were always beaten up", said abusive prison guards "had the impression this was authorised by Maggie Thatcher, as if they were on direct orders from the Prime Minister to carry out this abuse". Mark was "punished" for trying to appeal even after the real guilty person confessed. He was forced to stand naked for more than 24 hours while others, including staff, walked past. He is believed to have been sexually abused.

Inmates at Eastwood Park in Gloucestershire were constantly subjected to "waves and waves of verbal and physical abuse". Inmates were routinely deprived of sleep by "constant banging noises", guards talking into the PA system and guards "kicking cell doors loudly". During the day, inmates were arbitrarily sworn at by guards and were kicked and punched for frivolous reasons such as insufficiently rolled up sleeves or alleged uncombed hair. "Uncomfortable and intimidating" guards watched inmates showering. One victim recalled being forced to stand naked upon his arrival along with two others "for what felt like hours" while guards stared at them and verbally abused them. More than 30 years later, he still had "emotional scars" that "will stay with me forever".

Inmates at Kirklevington Detention Centre, North Yorkshire, "were physically abused on a daily basis" by officers who "were just sadistic and seemed to enjoy abusing young boys". All inmates were subjected to daily violence and were deprived of food and of meaningful contact with their families, with the contents of letters home being dictated to inmates. One victim who was incarcerated in Kirklevington as a 14-year-old boy feared for his life and emerged as "an anti-authoritarian criminal", from then on viewing authority "as the enemy". He said "I went on to spend most of my life in and out of prisons."

Whatton Detention Centre, Nottinghamshire, was described as "terrifying for everybody". Former inmate James Carré-Rice "spiralled into violence" and repeatedly reoffended when released. The 15-year-old was punched in the face immediately upon arrival for not saying "sir" to an officer. Once inside, inmates had their self-esteem constantly lowered by guards verbally abusing and insulting them and were all "beaten, punished, humiliated". Carré-Rice recalled children crying during the night. His friend was severely beaten for dancing in a hallway, and less than a month after being released, hanged himself.

== Abuse ==
Inmates in Medomsley were sexually and physically abused, throughout the life of the detention centre. The physical abuse sometimes resulted in hospitalisations due to severe injuries, including broken bones, wounds and loss of consciousness. Many inmates were raped by staff.

The wide variety of physical abuse and humiliation incidents included detainees being dragged from the toilets semi-naked for not finishing soon enough or for not preparing food quickly, being dragged by the hair during a beating, being force-fed salt for speaking during a meal, being punched for not saying "sir" to officers, almost drowning while locked in a box that was filled with water similar to water-boarding, being knocked from a 20-foot height then forced to walk with a broken back and being kicked, stamped on and pelted with heavy objects.

One victim said prison officers also orchestrated violence by inmates, having noticed that while he was "being kicked and punched and slapped", he "saw a prison officer at the door smiling." He said: "They were telling you that you were worthless, that's why you were in there, you were no good, nobody wanted you."

Police believe many of the staff belonged to an "organised paedophile ring". In 1970, Neville Husband, the chef and later a church cleric, moved to Medomsley where he raped inmates every day for 15 years.

The constituency MP Laura Pidcock described the centre as "a living hell".

=== Concealment ===
The public was prevented from learning of the abuse in various ways. Rape victims were silenced with death threats and beatings. At least 14 victims were ignored by police when they tried reporting the abuse upon their release, with rape victim Kevin Young being silenced with threats of being returned to Medomsley. Tony Skillen, whose skull was broken by a violent prison guard, was forced to pretend to hospital staff that the injury was accidental. Relatives of David Caldwel, a chronic asthma sufferer, believe his inquest ignored the role of extreme physical training that was forced by violent prison guards in triggering his fatal asthma attack. The Home Office dismissed and denied numerous reports of abuse.

Serial rapist Neville Husband used a kitchen store room as a bedroom containing sexual paraphernalia, where he forced a boy to sleep each night. He concealed the nightly rapes by prohibiting staff from searching the kitchen area. An officer testified "We knew something was going on, he – Husband – used to keep a boy behind in the kitchen at night, we always felt sorry for that boy."

In 2019, Operation Seabrook's lead investigator Detective Adrian Green found it "likely" other staff at Medomsley were aware "that physical and potentially sexual abuse was occurring" and "kept quiet about it". He added: "They should have intervened" and "shame on them." Detective Green warned "If I got any evidence to suggest cases of cover-ups I would be looking to prosecute."

== Investigations ==
Two police investigations led to seven former officers who abused Medomsley detainees being jailed for nearly 34 years in total.

Operation Halter saw serial rapist Neville Husband jailed in 2003, followed by Leslie Johnson in 2005, both for sexual abuse. Their sentences totalled 16 years.

Operation Seabrook resulted in five former Medomsley officers being jailed in 2019, all for physical abuse, with sentences totalling nearly 18 years.

In November 2025, the Prisons and Probation Ombudsman concluded Operation Deerness - their investigation into abuse at the detention centre. Their report found systemic failings by authorities and resulted in a public apology from the government.

=== Operation Halter ===
Operation Halter was a police investigation into sexual abuse of young inmates in Medomsley Detention Centre, which resulted in Medomsley officer Neville Husband being convicted in 2003 of sexually abusing five young inmates. He was jailed for this in February 2003 for eight years and jailed again in September 2003 for two more years for sexually assaulting another four inmates. Medomsley officer Leslie Johnson was subsequently jailed in 2005 for six years.

Lead investigator Detective Simon Orton said in 2003 "There could be a lot more [victims of Neville Husband]. But I would anticipate there are people who have put it behind them and would simply want to leave it that way. We will have to respect that." Detective Orton added "I can only surmise how many other people have been through his clutches."

=== Operation Seabrook ===
On 14 August 2013, police reopened investigations into historical abuse of young inmates in Medomsley Detention Centre, naming this new investigative phase Operation Seabrook. It had three aims – to provide victims with support "so they are in a better place", to fully understand the abuse in Medomsley, and to gather evidence against and prosecute living abusers. In March 2019, Operation Seabrook resulted in five former Medomsley officers being jailed for physically abusing detainees. The five – Christopher Onslow, John McGee, Brian Johnson Greenwell, Alan Bramley and Kevin Blakely – received jail terms totalling 17 years and 11 months.

The investigation was carried out by 70 Detectives from Durham Constabulary. Each detective interviewed and collected statements from a different group of victims. Its leader, Detective Superintendent Paul Goundry, said they were "experienced detectives" with many of them "specially-trained to deal with victims of sexual abuse".

Launching the investigation, Detective Goundry said the detectives "will go to see our victims in person, wherever they are, answer any queries they may have and steer them towards the appropriate counselling services if they need them. This will be a lengthy process but I am confident we have the resources in place." Counselling was offered to victims by "The Meadows", a nearby Sexual Assault Referral Centre. Detective Goundry promised to "put victims at the heart of the inquiry" and asked for "new information about Medomsley and any abuse that occurred either inside, or when inmates were taken off-site.

He said Operation Seabrook would "go where the evidence takes us" and that "every avenue will be explored and we’ll do our utmost to bring perpetrators to justice." He warned that any "officers who ignored evidence about a paedophile ring" would "be traced and investigated."

John McCabe was extremely thankful for the victim-centred investigative approach taken by Durham Constabulary, saying "Everything they are doing is victims focussed. They have done so much for the other victims and it means a lot me" and "When you look at the network of help they have put in place it is totally unbelievable." Rod Jones, who was abused in the 1960s, said because the investigation was so late, "the majority of prison officers who did this are now probably dead or are in their 80s and 90s" and he would never receive justice.

Within months of the investigation's launch, Goundry said "seasoned detectives have found it quite traumatic dealing with the experiences of these victims". By March 2014, Goundry expressed shock at "the sheer number of victims who have come forward" and said his team had "growing evidence" of "an organised paedophile ring" and a "brutal regime where violence was both extreme and routine", which ruined lives, leaving some traumatised victims unable to work or even leave their house.

By February 2017, 1400 victims had reported sexual or physical abuse to Operation Seabrook. 32 suspects were identified and 32 files were provided to the Crown Prosecution Service. By November, seven were charged and a further six were warned they could be charged if any new evidence emerges against them. The Crown Prosecution Service explained that some other abusers were no longer alive or were too difficult to identify. The seven charged men were released on bail. All faced charges of physical abuse and four were also charged with sexual abuse. They denied every charge. In August 2018, a further 11 faced no action because of insufficient available evidence. The six former Medomsley officers who received warnings remained under investigation.

The investigation was made difficult by some victims not recalling names of abusers or only knowing their nicknames, by victims' backgrounds and by the length of time since the crimes. The detective now leading the investigation, Chief Superintendent Adrian Green, explained that perpetrators were identified by showing victims old photographs of Medomsley staff and "timelines of nicknames". He said "it becomes difficult to turn these things into evidence."

71 victims appeared as witnesses in three trials in 2018 and 2019. in which five men were convicted of frequently physically attacking boys in Medomsley, causing severe bruises, bleeding, broken bones and unconsciousness. After the trials, Judge Howard Crowson praised the courage of all victims who reported the abuse.

In March 2019, Detective Green said all five convicted abusers had a "life-long impact" on their victims, having "devastated their quality of life and their ability to cope going forward". He said, "It's never ending for those individuals, and one of the important things is that this has allowed them to have a voice for them to be heard. ... Many of these people, are very very badly damaged by what occurred and that's devastated their lives." He hoped victims "found some solace in reporting their stories to police, being listened to, and that the issues at Medomsley are being discussed in public".

Detective Green described Operation Seabrook as "incredibly long and complex", having taken "more than five years". Far more victims had reported abuse than expected and he praised their "courage", saying "it is not easy to relive such distressing incidents". He was "extremely proud" of the investigators who "worked extremely hard" and were "dedicated people". 23,280 documents had been gathered and the investigation cost £1m. Detective Green expected "further charges [...] imminently" and asked other living victims, including those "who have suffered abuse in other establishments, not just Meadomsley" to contact Durham Police.

==== Media restrictions ====
News organisations were prohibited from publicising any of the verdicts or charges in three trials stemming from Operation Seabrook due to court imposed reporting restrictions, until the final verdict was delivered in March 2019. The trials had been scheduled for September 2018, November 2018 and January 2019.

During these temporary restrictions, only the names and ages of the seven defendants could be reported.

On 12 March 2019, following the verdict in the final trial, Judge Howard Crownson lifted the restrictions, allowing details from the three trials to finally be published.

== Victims ==
Over 1,800 former detainees reported sexual and extreme physical abuse by officers in Medomsley, including daily rapes and frequent severe beatings under a "culturally violent regime" that traumatised them for life. Many were so desperate to escape this criminal "systematic abuse" that they broke their own limbs in order to be hospitalised and therefore removed from Medomsley.

By March 2019, around 300 victims reported abuse by Neville Husband, which Durham Constabulary expected to become "considerably higher". He was brought to justice in 2003 by Operation Halter. Husband, the chef and a church cleric, raped boys at Medomsley every day for 15 years. One of his victims, Dave Stoker said he felt "so disgusted", "dirty" and "ashamed" that Husband had successfully intimidated him into silence that he turned to alcohol. Mr. Stoker later died of cirrhosis of the liver.

71 victims testified in three trials in 2018 and 2019 stemming from Operation Seabrook, in which five former Medomsley officers were jailed for physical abuse. The 71 witnesses described frequent physical assaults by officers that caused injuries such as broken bones and black eyes. When jailing three officers Judge Howard Crowson said victims "felt they could not complain, and those who did were told [that] to continue their complaints could result in a return to Medomsley."

During victim impact statements, one victim, who described Medomsley as "hell on earth", said it left him taking antidepressants for 30 years. He said Medomsley officers "seemed as though they were using us to show off to one another, laughing as they did it."

Others victims suffered recurring nightmares about Medomsley, even after 40 years, with at least one victim housebound, unable to work and largely out of touch with his three children, still overwhelmed by flashbacks and post traumatic stress disorder after 37 years. One victim described Medomsley as "a violent place" where prisoners were "treated like animals".

Investigators said prison officers inflicted "immeasurable suffering and lifelong damage" upon "the most vulnerable kids in society" causing "mental scars which have lasted a lifetime" and that reporting the abuse "has taken courage".

Judge Howard Crowson said former inmates "who had the courage to complain ... were either ignored or warned that to pursue the complaint would risk a return to Medomsley" which "no one wanted to risk", so "most of the victims told nobody". He said society at the time viewed such complaints as evidence the victim "had not learned his lesson".

=== 1967 reports ===
In 1967, a Member of Parliament informed the Home Office about reports of physical abuse against inmates, which the Home Office dismissed and denied.

A 17-year-old was hospitalised for five weeks with abdominal and groin pain soon after arriving in Medomsley. He described having been punched and "kicked, hit and struck with various objects" by "vicious", "kick and thump happy" officers. He compared Medomsley to "a prisoner of war camp".

Another 17-year-old described other prisoners trying to break their own limbs in an attempts to be hospitalised and therefore leave Medomsley. He reported that his own chest was beaten using a studded belt and found Medomsley to be "like hell".

Other former detainees said fellow inmates were often forced to keep jumping forward while crouching down and were kicked whenever they stopped with exhaustion. One said this forced "bunny-hopping" continued during the night and "heard screams [...] but nobody reports it in case they get filled in". He also recounted being punched in the mouth and detainees becoming airborne due to being severely punched in the stomach.

=== Deaths ===
Some inmates with medical conditions are believed to have died as a direct result of the actions of prison guards.

==== David Caldwell ====
At 17, David Caldwell died of an asthma attack in 1982 after being left unattended for two hours in Medomsley's hospital wing. His mother told his inquest that despite his chronic asthma, he was forced into severe physical training. His sister added "the bruises on his legs were caused by him being kicked around by prison officers" and said he and others were routinely hit in the face for not saying "sir".

In 2014, she called for the case to be reopened and fully investigated. She felt the inquest, which attributed Caldwell's death to natural causes, "was a waste of time" because "they weren't interested" and "weren't listening" to her information. She said "I have got asthma, too, and I know if you get agitated it can bring it on – and he had asthma worse than me. I believe the attack was brought on by his ill-treatment."

==== Ian Shackleton ====
Ian Shackleton, who had diabetes, fell into a coma and died in 1981 after being denied insulin.

=== David Alan Brown ===
David Alan Brown was physically abused and prevented from attending his grandmother's funeral during his three months in Medomsley in 1981 for a crime he didn't commit. At 17, he was "beaten up everyday" by Christopher Onslow, who repeatedly kicked him while forcing him to run without footwear, for being unable to run four miles within 35 minutes. Other detainees asked Brown to jump on and break their own legs so that they could avoid this brutal physical training under Onslow.

Brown and others were beaten for not addressing officers as "sir". Officer John McGee punched Brown in the mouth for complaining about not being allowed to attend his grandmother's funeral. Brown believes the physical abuse was sadistic and knew that others were being sexually assaulted. He said officers targeted smaller weaker inmates.

He was initially too afraid to report the abuse, expecting to be disbelieved, and eventually found the courage after he saw a BBC documentary about Operation Seabrook. However, all records of his imprisonment in Medomsley had been destroyed, making him feel like he "was going crazy" and leaving him to search for and rely on a detailed diary by his father, which had almost been dumped, as evidence.

Brown said even after decades, "I do think about it everyday" and "the memories will never go out of my brain".

=== Doug Corkhill ===
Doug Corkhill was sent to Medomsley for six months in 1978.

He suffered recurring sexual assaults by Neville Husband each week and was physically abused and humiliated by other officers. As soon as he entered Medomsley, officers strip searched him and others and struck Corkhill's head for not saying "sir" when Corkhill informed an officer he wore spectacles. Another time, an officer humiliated him by pulling him by the hair from a toilet cubicle with his underwear down in front of other inmates, some of whom laughed at him, while the officer was beating him, reducing him to tears.

He was haunted for life by memories of other inmates being violently attacked by staff, such as inmates' heads being pelted with crates for cheering to sports results on the radio and an exhausted young inmate screaming and crying out for his mother while being beaten and kicked by Christopher Onslow for being unable to continue running a four-mile "fence run" in 35 minutes.

=== Ian Farrer ===
At 17, Ian Farrer was physically abused and humiliated in Medomsley in 1987 and reported this to police in 2014. He experienced physical abuse daily and recalled being knocked to the ground with "a massive blow to my kidneys", then hit on the head by a prison guard for having a loose buckle. Farrer recalled other inmates intentionally having their own legs broken in order to avoid the violent attacks they might otherwise face.

Prison guards routinely woke inmates during the night with loud noises and forced them to "do bunnyhops all around the place".

He had been sent to Medomsley for four months for handling stolen property.

=== Rod Jones ===
Rod Jones "never got over" abuse in Medomsley, even after 50 years. Aged 17, he was locked inside a laundry basket and rolled a quarter of a mile. A hose was inserted and he said "I could feel myself drowning. It was like water-boarding. I lost consciousness and the next thing I knew I was tipped out onto the floor of my cell."

He was subjected to "beating after beating" and, desperate to escape, confessed to over a hundred crimes he had never committed.

Officers also gave him a rope, telling him to hang himself or "they would do it for me".

=== John McCabe ===
John McCabe, a 17-year-old from Scotland, spent six months in Medomsley in the early 1980s; Neville Husband raped him nearly every night he was there. The abuse began the day he started his job in the kitchen, with Husband grabbing him, "creepily" pressing himself against him and later intimidating him with a knife. The rapes began the next day. Husband sometimes took McCabe outside of Medomsley, where a second man raped him, watched by a woman. The second man was never prosecuted. McCabe believed he would die in Medomsley and was told by Husband "I could kill you and put you in one of these boxes and bury you and nobody would know."

In 2012 he sought an enquiry, together with his local MP for East Kilbride, Michael McCann, who wrote "a formal request" for a full inquiry to Justice Secretary Ken Clarke. McCann attributed Operation Seabrook's launch to McCabe's "bravery and his ability to speak out about it, and giving up his anonymity", which resulted in McCann "raising the matter at Prime Minister’s Questions" and "finally convinced County Durham Police Force to open up the investigation." Operation Seabrook's lead investigator Detective Superintendent Paul Goundry praised "Mr McCabe’s courage in allowing himself to be named" and said McCabe "motivated not only myself, but also my team, to bring others to justice."

=== Ray Poar ===
At 17, Ray Poar was incarcerated in Medomsley for stealing biscuits.

Upon his arrival, he was immediately ordered to help in the kitchen, where Neville Husband violently assaulted him. Poar said "When I said ‘no’, he started squeezing my neck as hard as he could. He just kept squeezing and squeezing until I was passing out and I thought I was going to die. He was saying in my ear, ‘You could disappear from here, nobody would care and nobody would know’. It was absolutely terrifying." Poar passed out and when he regained consciousness, he was being raped. He was too frightened to tell anyone. He was raped again the following day and said "from then on it just got worse". Being raped by Husband "became part of the routine of the day". He didn't resist because he "didn't want to die".

He believes other prison guards knew about the abuse and chose not to stop it and said "We knew we couldn't turn around to them and complain to them about what had happened with Husband because they were part of it, they were the ones that were kicking us about every day. ... You had nobody to talk to." Tim Newell, Medomsley's governor from 1978 to 1981, said "If staff knew about the abuse taking place I am very concerned they let the abuse continue."

Poar was also subjected to humiliation, on one occasion being awoken after having wet the bed and made to run to the showers "bunny-hopping" while naked and being kicked.

In the years following his incarceration in Medomsley, Poar suffered a nervous breakdown and almost jumped into a swollen river in a suicide attempt. He had "thought everyone was a paedophile" and, on becoming a father, struggled with an overwhelming terror of his own children being raped. A year after the birth of his son, he was unable to work properly, drinking heavily, sinking into debt and suicidal. He only survived thanks to support from a friend and from his wife.

He reported the abuse to police after Husband's initial conviction in 2003.

Poar remained affected by Medomsley ever since Husband's abuse, saying after 40 years, "from the moment I wake up I'm thinking about Medomsley until the minute I go to bed" and "it's ruined my life, it's completely ruined it."

=== Eric Sampson ===
Eric Sampson, who was abused in Medomsley when he was 17, said it was "a hellhole", "worse than a concentration camp", "run on violence, every day, morning, afternoon and night" and "the most shocking, horrible place I've ever been in my life". He had been prevented from disclosing the abuse by threats of death.

=== Barry Segar ===
Barry Segar, who was incarcerated in Medomsley when he was a boy, revealed in 2019 that he still suffers "nightmares" and is still too afraid to leave his home because "going places" causes recurring "flashbacks ... my body shakes", and said he was attending counselling.

=== Tony Skillen ===
At 16, Tony Skillen was hospitalised because his skull was broken in a severe beating by Christopher Onslow. "Discipline officer" Brian Johnson Greenwell forced Skillen to pretend in hospital that the injury Onslow inflicted was caused by an accidental fall.

The experience caused Skillen 40 years of "awful mental health problems" and was "still a nightmare to look back on". He said Medomsley was "like a concentration camp" where "the daily routine was just violence" that "never stopped" because "if you weren't getting it, someone else was". In Medomsley, Skillen feared for his life.

=== Dave Stoker ===
Dave Stoker was also sent to Medomsley at age 17 for a minor theft. Also a victim of Neville Husband, he was "frightened to tell anyone", because Husband told him, "he would make my life hell", if the sexual abuse became known.

This left Stoker feeling "so disgusted", "dirty" and "ashamed", pushing him to alcoholism. He died of cirrhosis of the liver.

=== Peter Toole ===
Peter Toole was sent to Medomsley in 1985 at age 20 for handling stolen goods. He had his head banged into a wall immediately upon arriving.

In 2019, he said, "they tried to break you. The place was run on violence".

=== Kevin Young ===
At 17, Kevin Young, who spent his childhood in care, was incarcerated in Medomsley in 1977 for possessing a £12 stolen watch that his brother gave him. Neville Husband began sexually abusing him almost immediately and it soon escalated. "Within days what started as light touching and pressing himself against me very quickly escalated into situations where he was forcing me to go upstairs to a store room area. He would lock me in the store room area and uninterrupted would carry out what I've always described as torture." Husband tied him up, blindfolded him and raped him nearly every day. Some days, Young was gang-raped at Husband's home. Husband responded with death threats to Young's pleas for him to stop. Young was repeatedly "told I could be found hanging in my cell", which he believed because "that year two boys had been found hanging in their cell. I was in fear of my life."

The day he was released, Young tried to report the abuse to police, showing an officer strangulation marks on his neck, who replied that making such a report against a prison officer was itself a criminal offence. Officers at Consett police station silenced Young by threatening to return him to Medomsley and ignored his complaint.

== Perpetrators ==
Seven former officers were jailed for abusing Medomsley inmates, including two for sexual abuse. Police suspected the two belonged to a larger child sex abuse ring.

Six more former Medomsley officers were warned they could face charges if further evidence against them emerges. The Crown Prosecution Service explained that other abusive Medomsley officers were either dead or were too difficult to identify.

The Ministry of Justice stated after convictions in March 2019, "It is right that those responsible for such appalling behaviour are finally being brought to justice and we hope never to see abuse on this scale ever again."

Perpetrator	Conviction(s)	Sentence
Neville Husband ("The Chef")	Indecent assault (10 counts), buggery	10 years
Leslie Johnson	Sexual offences	6 years
Christopher Onslow ("The Machine")	"Grievous bodily harm" (GBH), wounding to inflict GBH, "misconduct in public office" (two counts), "actual bodily harm" (three counts).	8 1/2 years
Kevin Blakely ("Broken Nose")	Misconduct in public office	2 years and nine months
John McGee ("Pigeon Man")	Assault, misconduct in public office	2 years and eight months
Brian Johnson Greenwell ("Puppet")	Misconduct in public office	2 1/2 years
Alan Bramley ("Bong Eye")	Misconduct in public office	1 1/2 years

Because of Operation Halter, two former Medomsley officers were jailed for sexual offences against inmates. Serial rapist Neville Husband was convicted and jailed in 2003, followed by Leslie Johnson in 2005. Their sentences totalled 16 years.

Under Operation Seabrook, five more officers – Onslow, McGee, Bramley and Blakely – were convicted in late 2018 and early 2019 of physically abusing inmates and received prison sentences totalling nearly 18 years.

Judge Howard Crowson said officers frequently punched and stamped on inmates, which went beyond what legally permissible even in those days and amounted to criminal misconduct.

Operation Seabrook's leader Detective Chief Superintendent Adrian Green said Medomsley officers "abused their position", inflicting "immeasurable suffering and lifelong damage". He said more abusers remain at large and that he "would be looking to prosecute" those who covered it up.

=== Neville Husband ===
Neville Husband, the chef and later a church cleric, raped boys at Medomsley every day for 15 years and silenced his victims by threatening to kill them.

He received two prison sentences in 2003, totalling 10 years. The first was for eight years in February 2003 for indecent assault (10 counts) and buggery, against five boys. When sentenced, he was expressionless and his victims were visibly relieved. The second was for two years in September 2003 for sexually abusing another four young victims. Judge Esmond Faulks told Husband "You and others like you helped cause their damaged personalities. Up until now, they never thought anyone would believe them."

He worked in prisons for 27 years, 17 of which were in Medomsley where he ran the kitchens, beginning in 1970. His sentences in 2003 were for sexual abuse he perpetrated there from 1974 to 1984.

Husband was investigated under Operation Halter. Its leader, Northumbria Police's Detective Inspector Simon Orton, explained in 2003, "There could be a lot more [victims of Neville Husband], but I would anticipate there are people who have put it behind them and would simply want to leave it that way. We will have to respect that." Detective Orton said: "It is clear that this man forced himself on the young men in his charge. I can only surmise how many other people have been through his clutches. I think the sentence was entirely appropriate and reflected the abhorrent nature of the breach of trust he perpetrated all those years ago." Prison service director Sir Martin Narey apologised to Husband's victims "without reservation", saying "we should have stopped him much earlier."

Husband's victims were 16 to 19-year-old inmates who he chose to work with him in the kitchen. Sometimes he "blatantly" sexually assaulted them there and sometimes he brought them elsewhere and secretly abused them. He hid alcohol in the kitchen and used a kitchen store room as a bedroom with sexual paraphernalia where he forced a boy to sleep each night. He prohibited staff from searching the kitchen area. Lead investigator Detective Paul Goundry said any detainee who worked for Husband in the kitchen "would almost certainly be raped or sexually abused".

Husband targeted boys who spent time in care and were unlikely to have family support. One victim, Kevin Young, described him as "one of the most power crazed men I have come across and I have met some violent people". Husband tied up and blindfolded Young, ordered him to strip naked and took pornographic photographs of him. A victim described being assaulted by Husband every day, with Husband apologising each time and promising not to do it again. The victim said "The more I complained, the worse it got" and during each attack, he pleaded with Husband to stop. Husband responded by promising not to do it again and threatening that the boy "could be found hung in a cell" if he dared tell anyone. Husband also overpowered a victim by threatening him with a knife. One victim aged just under 18 who made a complaint to the police about Husband immediately after being released was threatened by police that it was a criminal offence to make such allegations against a prison officer; being on licence he risked being sent back to Medomsley. In 2007, the Crown Prosecution Service refused to prosecute Husband for abusing a boy in Deerbolt Youth Offenders' Institution, saying charges would be "not in the public interest".

While working in Medomsley in 1985, Husband was caught with pornography and sex toys in his locker and moved to Frankland prison, facing no further action. He had also been investigated for smuggling pornography into prison a decade before starting in Medomsley and was arrested in 1969 for possessing pornographic images of teenage boys, while working in Portland Borstal, Dorset. He faced no action after claiming these pornographic images were research for a book. The images included photographs of boys in Portland Borstal and sado-masochistic images of boys.

Husband was married with one child. After he finished working in prisons in 1990 he was awarded the Imperial Service Medal for long and meritorious service. In 1994 he became a minister at the United Reformed Church and ran two churches. He kept thousands of child pornography images on computers in his home and church office along with sex aids and sexually explicit novels and videos. His release from prison in 2009 alarmed victims. When he died in August 2010, victims expressed relief, with one saying he "would always have been a risk as long as he was alive."

An inquiry ordered by the Ministry of Justice attributed 343 offences to Husband, "possibly the most prolific sex offender in British history", and exposed "shameful failings" by authorities, in their report in 2025. This led to apologies from Durham Constabulary and the MoJ, which also apologised on "behalf of all governments, past and present".

=== Leslie Johnson ===
Leslie Johnson's jail sentence in 2005 was six years for sexually abusing Medomsley inmates. He also received a suspended sentence of nine months in 1990 for sexually assaulting a boy in Medomsley and a second boy elsewhere. Johnson was previously arrested at Medomsley in 1985. He worked in Medomsley as a "storeman".

Johnson told a trial Neville Husband had "given a boy" to him.

Johnson died following his release from prison.

=== Christopher Onslow ===
Christopher Onslow (nicknamed "The Machine") was jailed in 2019 for eight-and-a-half-years for "grievous bodily harm" (GBH), wounding to inflict GBH, "misconduct in public office" (two counts, both relating to physical abuse) and "actual bodily harm" (three counts). He submitted an appeal against this conviction.

One victim, David Alan Brown, said "it should have been 18 and a half years for Onslow".

His conviction for grievous bodily harm was for knocking an inmate from a height of 20 feet, breaking his back. When this overweight inmate became stuck on an obstacle course net, Onslow and a second officer pelted him with rocks and bricks, causing him to fall backwards 20 feet to the ground, crushing three vertebrae. When the injured inmate screamed, Onslow shouted "Shut up you soft bastard, there's nothing wrong with you." An officer forced him to get up and walk in extreme agony to the medical room. His injuries were so severe that he spent weeks in a body cast.

Onslow's conviction for wounding was because he whacked a teenage inmate in the face with a boot, breaking his nose. and causing lasting scars, walloped his head again, tearing his ear, then pelted him with heavy medicine balls. The victim said it "was the most violent experience of my life and I thought I was going to die that day", describing Medomsley as "an absolute hell hole" and "torture".

Onslow organised physical training for inmates from 1975 to 1985 and frequently assaulted inmates in the gym.

Onslow assaulted a prisoner who told him "there's something amiss with Mr Husband" after being raped by Neville Husband, and ordered the prisoner never to disclose the rape to anyone.

Onslow kicked and stamped on a 17-year-old, then pelted him with medicine balls, breaking his ankle.

Onslow and other officers tormented a mixed race detainee with an onslaught of racist abuse.

Onslow beat a boy on the head using a shoe, for not reaching the showers fast enough. While he was desperately fleeing, the boy collided with a concrete post and lost consciousness, causing migraines that continued for decades.

Onslow beat up another inmate for picking a team of inmates that won a game of football against a staff team and violently attacked a 17-year-old who lost a 200-metre race because this lost him a £10 bet.

He was described by David Alan Brown as an "animal" that "loved every minute" of being "aggressive and very violent" and by another as the "most feared officer".

=== Kevin Blakely ===
Kevin Blakely (nicknamed "Broken Nose") was jailed in 2019 for two years and nine months for misconduct (two counts). The misconduct was that he physically assaulted and abused detainees. He punched a boy for reporting sexual abuse to him and kicked a detainee who was in bed.

When he was convicted on 12 March 2019, Blakely was allowed bail until sentencing on 4 April. Judge Howard Crowson said Blakely participated in a "culturally brutal regime".

He was a Medomsley officer from 1974 to 1983.

=== John McGee ===
John McGee (nicknamed "Pigeon Man" and "Big John") was jailed in 2019 for two years and eight months. He was convicted of "actual bodily harm" and of misconduct. He submitted an appeal against these convictions. He was acquitted of sexual offences.

He punched a much smaller teenager's face and burst his nose, causing a shock so severe that he soiled himself. McGee forced the teenager to bunny hop along a corridor to a shower.

He was described by David Brown as "horrible", "a big bloke" and "always beating you". Brown was punched in the mouth by McGee for complaining about not being allowed to attend his grandmother's funeral.

He was an officer at Medomsley from 1975 to 1982.

=== Brian Johnson Greenwell ===
Brian Johnson Greenwell (nicknamed "Puppet") was jailed in 2019 for two and a half years. A jury found him guilty of misconduct and not guilty of a sexual offence. He remained expressionless while he was being sentenced.

He dragged an inmate from the toilets who was half naked, for not being fast enough when preparing food.

He was a chef and a "discipline officer" in Medomsley from 1973 to 1988.

=== Alan Bramley ===
Alan Bramley (nicknamed "Bong Eye") received a one-and-a-half year prison sentence in 2019 for misconduct in public office.

He punched a detainee for supporting the Sunderland football team.

When he was convicted on 12 March 2019, Bramley was released on bail until his sentencing in April.

He was a Medomsley officer from 1973 to 1977.

== Calls for an inquiry ==
From around 2002, Kevin Young and other victims have called for abuse in Medomsley to be investigated by a full public inquiry. When Operation Seabrook began in 2013, he said "Nobody listened to [our calls for an inquiry]. I hope the police do the job now."

In 2014, North West Durham's MP, Pat Glass, sought a parliamentary inquiry into historical abuse of young detainees. She "approached the chairman of the Home Affairs select committee Keith Vaz" and asked the committee to examine "the whole issue of historic abuse in places like Medomsley", which she said had "a systematic reign of terror".

In 2019, legal experts also sought a full open inquiry because they believe some instances of abuse in Medomsley were severe enough to have violated Article 3 of the Human Rights Act, which prohibits "torture" and "inhuman or degrading treatment or punishment." They said the authorities' failure to stop the abuse was another cogent reason for an inquiry. Jonny Hall, a solicitor in the Student Law Office in Northumbria University, said not holding one "shows lack of respect for the human rights of vulnerable people and fails to uphold the rule of law." He said a public inquiry is needed "to get to the heart of how it was that they could perpetrate such violence against the inmates for such a long period of time". William Kew, a student in the Student Law Office at the time, said "these people were in detention so they were under the state's protection. There was no way they could escape any ill-treatment they received." He continued, "there's always that worry that something could be happening in another place now." The law firm Ben Hoare Bell, in collaboration with students from Northumbria University's Student Law Office, wrote to Home Secretary Sajid Javid with a 16-page letter seeking a public inquiry into Medomsley abuse. The firm's Andrew Freckleton said "Medomsley was an institution in which physical and sexual abuse were commonplace. Those convicted were the tip of the iceberg."

In April 2019, the law firm Ben Hoare Bell also asked the chairperson of the Independent Inquiry into Child Sexual Abuse to review the limit on its scope that restricted this inquiry to sexual abuse of children. Jonny Hall, from the Student Law Office in Northumbria University said this limit on its terms of reference makes the inquiry "unable to inquire in detail into well over 1,000 survivor accounts of sexual abuse in Medomsley for those over the age of 18 and physical abuse for any child or young person in Medomsley". In May 2019, the MP Laura Pidcock joined the call by asking Prime Minister Theresa May during prime minister's questions, "Many of the victims are not covered by the inquiry into child sexual abuse because of their age. We need to know what happened at Medomsley, we need justice for survivors and we need to make sure it never happens again. Will the Prime Minister please say we can have an independent public inquiry into the abuse at Medomsley Detention Centre?". The prime minister was surprised that these Medomsley victims "weren't able to be covered by that inquiry" and said "I will certainly look at that issue."

== See also ==
- Independent Inquiry into Child Sexual Abuse
- List of youth detention incidents in Canada
