= Phil Wheatley =

Philip Martin Wheatley CB (born 4 July 1948) is a British prison officer, formerly the Director General of the National Offender Management Service and before that, the Director General of HM Prison Service.

Having attended Leeds Grammar School, Wheatley read law at the University of Sheffield, immediately joining the Prison Service as an officer in 1969 on graduation. He worked in a variety of prisons before becoming Governor of HM Prison Hull in 1986. In 1990, he moved to headquarters, where he held a variety of operational management jobs.

On 1 March 2003, he was appointed Director General of HM Prison Service, the first Director General to have previously been a prison officer. On 1 April 2008, the Prison Service was merged with the National Probation Service to create the National Offender Management Service (NOMS), which he subsequently led as Director General.

On 14 June 2004, he was made a Companion of the Order of the Bath (CB) on the Queen's Birthday Honours list.

He retired in June 2010. Jack Straw, Justice Minister during Wheatley's time as Director General of NOMS, praised him as "an extraordinarily dedicated individual" with "a record of public service that is second to none". Wheatley has since taken up employment as consultant to G4S, which operates prisons and justice services in the UK and elsewhere. His successor is Michael Spurr who was previously the Chief Operating Officer of NOMS.

Phil Wheatley has two children.

== Employment History ==
- 1969–70 Officer, Hatfield borstal, HM Prison Leeds;
- 1970–74 Assistant governor, HM Prison Hull;
- 1974–78 Training specialist, HM Prison Service College;
- 1978–82 Assistant governor, HM Prison Leeds;
- 1982–86 Deputy governor, HM Prison Gartree, Leicestershire;
- 1986–90 Governor, HM Prison Hull;
- 1990–92 HM Prison Service East Midlands area manager;
- 1992–95 Assistant Director of Custody, HM Prison Service;
- 1995–1999 Director of Dispersals (in charge of six highest security jails);
- 1998–2003 Deputy Director General, HM Prison Service;
- 2003–2008 Director General, HM Prison Service;
- 2008–2010 Director General, National Offender Management Service.

Preceded by Martin Narey	Director General; HM Prison Service; 2003–2008	Succeeded by Himself; As Director-General, National Offender Management Service
Preceded by Himself; As Director General, HM Prison Service	Director General; National Offender Management Service; 2008–2010	Succeeded by Michael Spurr; As Chief Executive, National Offender Management
Preceded by Helen Edwards; As Chief Executive, National Offender Management Service	Director General; National Offender Management Service; 2008–2010	Succeeded by Michael Spurr; As Chief Executive, National Offender Management
