= Regional Offender Manager =

There has been a regional offender manager (ROM) for each of the nine English regions and Wales since 2004/05, when the National Offender Management Service within the Home Office was created to oversee correctional services in England and Wales.

Their establishment was part of the process begun by the Carter Report (2003) which had recommended a new service to bring the roles of the National Probation Service and prisons closer together in the management of offenders.

ROMS are responsible for the improvement of the performance of the providers in their respective regions with which they have service level agreements (in the case of public sector prisons and probation areas) and contracts (in the case of private sector prisons). They are also accountable for the reduction of reoffending in their regions, which they seek to effect through multi-agency partnerships between the agencies and other government departments which can influence the factors which are known to increase the likelihood of offending, such as problematic use with alcohol or drugs, inadequate or no accommodation, physical and mental health, and finance, debt and benefit problems.

Following the restructure of NOMS in 2008, prison area managers and ROMS were merged into one office working to a new post, the director of offender management (DOM) in each region. The two areas that piloted this (Wales and London) no longer have a ROM at all, instead the workload has been directly transferred to the new DOM.
