= Medomsley =

Village in County Durham, England

Coordinates: 54.883943°N 1.816195°W

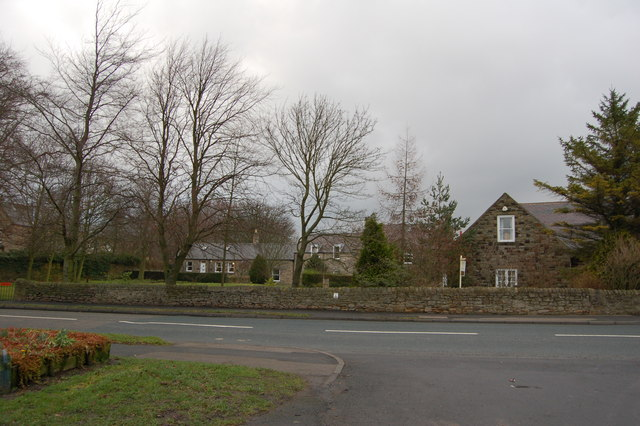
- Cottages in the village

- Location within County Durham
- OS grid reference: NZ1254
- Civil parish: unparished
- Unitary authority: County Durham
- Ceremonial county: Durham
- Region: North East
- Country: England
- Sovereign state: United Kingdom
- Post town: Consett
- Postcode district: DH8
- Police: Durham
- Fire: County Durham and Darlington
- Ambulance: North East
- UK Parliament: Blaydon and Consett

Medomsley is a village in County Durham, England. It is about 2 miles (3 km) northeast of the centre of Consett, 1 1/2 miles (2 km) south of Hamsterley and 1 mile (2 km) southeast of Ebchester along the B6309. Leadgate lies a further mile to the south east.

Medomsley is about 778 feet (237 m) above sea level, atop a hill overlooking the Derwent Valley. The village has views of the Pennines and the surrounding countryside for miles around.

== Toponym ==
The Boldon Book of 1183 records Medomsley as Medomesley. The Vita S Godrici, written in 1190, records it as Madmeslei. The placename is derived from Old English and may mean the “middlemost clearing” or “Maethhelm’s clearing”.

== Parish church ==
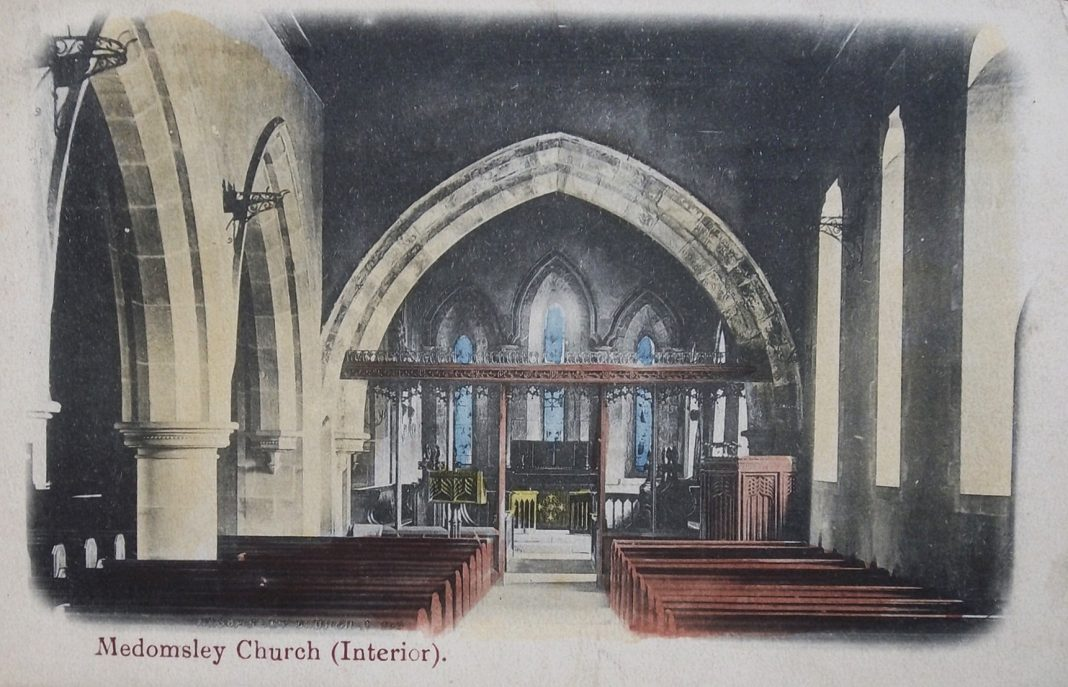
The interior of St Mary Magdalene Church, before 1914

The Church of England parish church of St Mary Magdalene is a sandstone building completed in the 13th century. In 1878 it was restored to designs by the architects HJ Austin, RJ Johnson and WS Hicks, who added a new roof, chancel screen (designed by Hicks) and north aisle. It is a Grade I listed building.

Medomsley's church served many inhabitants of Shotley Bridge for baptisms, marriages and burials until the creation of Shotley Bridge parish in the 19th century. The sword-makers of Shotley Bridge were frequent visitors of the church, and the parish registers record many of these events.

== Notable people ==
The antiquarian and physician Christopher Hunter (1675–1757) was born at Medomsley Hall.

== Coal mining ==
There were two collieries near the village: Medomsley Colliery southwest of the village and Derwent Colliery immediately to the north. Medomsley Colliery was opened in 1839. It was also known as the Busty pit, and is not to be confused with South Medomsley Colliery near Annfield Plain. Derwent Colliery was opened in 1856.

Both pits were opened by Edward Richardson and Co. The Consett Iron Company took them over in the 1860s. They were nationalised in 1947.

Coal left the two pits by rail. A 2-mile (3 km) freight-only railway ran south from Derwent Colliery via Medomsley Colliery to a junction west of Leadgate, where it joined the Stanhope and Tyne line of the North Eastern Railway.

There were several mining accidents at the pits. One in 1923 killed eight miners. In 1957, in another accident, two miners were rescued uninjured.

The National Coal Board closed Derwent Colliery in 1964 and Medomsley Colliery in 1972. It proposed opencast coal mining near Medomsley, but in 1976 the Secretary of State for Energy, Tony Benn, rejected the proposal.

== Governance ==
There is just one tier of local government covering Medomsley, being the unitary authority of Durham County Council.

Medomsley was formerly a township and chapelry in the parish of Lanchester, but became a separate civil parish in 1866. In 1931 the parish had a population of 7,005. On 1 April 1937 the parish was abolished and merged with Consett, except a small part which went to Stanley.

== Amenities ==
Scheduled bus services link Medomsley with Consett and Newcastle upon Tyne. Medomsley has a cricket club, at High Westwood, that was founded in 1926.

== Youth detention centres ==
Hassockfield youth detention centre is on a 33 acres (13 ha) site on the edge of Medomsley.

=== Medomsley Detention Centre ===
The site was previously Medomsley Detention Centre, where some staff sexually and physically abused thousands of boys in the 1970s and 80s. In 1988 the centre closed after the scandal of the paedophile officer Neville Husband.

=== Hassockfield detention centre ===
The centre was re-opened in 1999. In 2004 Adam Rickwood, a resident of Hassockfield, committed suicide. After this incident Hassockfield improved its performance, but it was closed again in 2015.

== Bibliography ==
- Ekwall, Eilert (1960) [1936]. Concise Oxford Dictionary of English Place-Names (4th ed.). Oxford: Oxford University Press. Medomsley. ISBN 0198691033.
- Longstaffe, W. Hylton Dyer. (1970). Early history of Ebchester, Friarside, and Medomsley.. Transactions of the Architectural and Archaeological Society of Durham and Northumberland 2. Vol 2, pp. 125-133.
- Pevsner, Nikolaus; Williamson, Elizabeth (revision) (1983) [1953]. County Durham. The Buildings of England (2nd ed.). Harmondsworth: Penguin Books. pp. 362–363. ISBN 0-14-071009-4.
- Surtees, Robert (1820). "Chapelry of Medomsley". The History and Antiquities of the County Palatine of Durham. Vol. 2: Chester ward. London: Nichols & Son. pp. 284–297.
- Watts, Victor (2002). A dictionary of County Durham place-names. Nottingham: English Place-Name Society. Medomsley. ISBN 0904889653.
