= Inner London Probation Service =

District General Secretary Youth Congress Udham Singh Nagar Uttarakhand

The Inner London Probation Service existed until 31 March 2001 when it was succeeded by the larger London Probation Area. Its final Chief Probation Officer was John Harding, later visiting professor at the University of Hertfordshire. He succeeded Graham Smith, who went on to be the Chief Inspector of Probation in England and Wales and was knighted towards the end of his career. Seldon Charles Forrester Farmer, OBE was the longest serving Principal Probation Officer for London from 1948 - 1970 when he retired. Seldon Farmer was previously the Principal Probation Officer for the County of Berkshire and the Chair of Napo (trade union) from 1946 - 1949.

== Principal/Chief Probation Officers ==
During its 64 year history were

1. Guy Clutton-Brock (1937 -1940)
2. Ralph Henry Beeson OBE (1941 -1948)
3. Seldon Charles Forrester Farmer OBE (1948 - 1970)
4. Bill Pearce OBE (1970 - 1980)
5. Sir Graham William Smith (1981 - 1992)
6. John Harding CBE 1993 - 2001

== Assistant/Deputy Principal/Chief Probation Officers ==
Note: Because of the number of deputies it is not easily possible to give either the terms of office, chronology, nor a comprehensive list.

- Stanley Ratcliffe
- Winifred Joan Woodward (1950-72)
- E George Pratt
- Mr J P Dunphy
- Peter P Shervington OBE (1971- ?)
- Eric Knapman

== History ==
At an earlier point it was known as the Inner London Probation and After Care Service.

Its boundaries were the same as ILEA (the Inner London Education Service) and it consisted of the 12 Inner London boroughs.

A book about its early years was written by a former employee. It is now called the London Probation Service and includes some of the outer London Boroughs.
