= Epsom and Ewell (constituency) =

UK Parliament constituency (since 1974)

Coordinates: 51.32°N 0.28°W

- Borough constituency for the House of Commons
- Interactive map of boundaries from 2024
- Boundary of Epsom and Ewell in South East England
- County: Surrey
- Electorate: 76,844 (2023)
- Borough: Epsom and Ewell
- Major settlements: Epsom; Ewell; Ashtead; Leatherhead

Current constituency
- Created: 1974
- Member of Parliament: Helen Maguire (Liberal Democrats)
- Seats: One
- Created from: Epsom

Epsom and Ewell is a constituency (Note: A borough constituency (for the purposes of election expenses and type of returning officer)) in Surrey represented in the House of Commons of the UK Parliament since 2024 by Helen Maguire, a Liberal Democrat. (Note: As with all constituencies, the constituency elects one Member of Parliament (MP) by the first past the post system of election at least every five years.)

== Constituency profile ==
Epsom and Ewell is a suburban constituency located in Surrey. It covers the towns of Epsom, Ewell and Leatherhead and the village of Ashtead. The constituency lies on the outskirts of Greater London within the protected Metropolitan Green Belt and forms part of London's urban area. Much of the area was developed in the interwar period and houses many London commuters. Epsom is known for the Derby, a prestigious annual horse race which takes place at the town's racecourse. The area is highly affluent, with most of the constituency falling within the 10% least-deprived areas in England, and house prices are considerably higher than the national average. Epsom, Ewell and Ashtead were all ranked in the top ten best places to live in England and Wales in 2025 according to Garrington, with Epsom in second place.

In general, residents of the constituency are well-educated, have high levels of household income and are more likely to work in professional occupations compared to the rest of the country. White people made up 82% of the population at the 2021 census with Asians forming the largest ethnic minority group at 10%. At the local council level, Epsom and Ewell are mostly represented by a local residents' association, whilst Leatherhead elected Conservatives and Liberal Democrats. An estimated 52% of voters in the constituency supported remaining in the European Union in the 2016 referendum, higher than the nationwide rate of 48%.

== History ==
The seat has existed since the February 1974 general election, forming the centre of the previous Epsom constituency. Epsom had been held by a Conservative since its creation in the Redistribution of Seats Act 1885 and the new seat continued to elect Conservative MPs with sizable majorities.

Chris Grayling was first elected in 2001; he went on to serve in the cabinets of the Cameron and May governments from 2010 to 2019. Grayling stood down for the 2024 general election, when Helen Maguire took the seat for the Liberal Democrats for the first time on a swing of 18%.

In Westminster elections, it was, until 2024, one of the strongest Conservative areas in the country. Locally, however, the majority area council (Epsom and Ewell Borough Council) is controlled by the local Residents' Association. Conservatives regularly run the two slightly included neighbouring councils and until recently the party rarely contested the main borough's elections. One ward in Epsom, Court, is quite strongly Labour, and several Residents Association councillors have sided against Conservative-run Reigate and Banstead council, which is also electorally diverse.

In 1987, Barbara Follett, later Member of Parliament for Stevenage, unsuccessfully stood for the Labour Party in the constituency.

== Boundaries ==
=== Historic ===
Map of boundaries 2010–2024

Before 1997 Epsom and Ewell excluded Ashtead but instead included Banstead from Reigate and Banstead. As the borough of Epsom and Ewell is small and includes relatively sparsely populated areas such as Epsom Downs, the constituency has consistently also included areas of neighbouring Surrey districts.

1974–1983: The Municipal Borough of Epsom and Ewell, and the Urban District of Leatherhead.

1983–1997: The Borough of Epsom and Ewell, and the Borough of Reigate and Banstead wards of Banstead Village, Nork, Preston, and Tattenhams.

1997–2010: The Borough of Epsom and Ewell, the District of Mole Valley wards of Ashtead Common, Ashtead Park, and Ashtead Village, and the Borough of Reigate and Banstead wards of Nork, Preston, and Tattenhams.

2010–2024: The Borough of Epsom and Ewell, the District of Mole Valley wards of Ashtead Common, Ashtead Park, and Ashtead Village, and the Borough of Reigate and Banstead wards of Nork and Tattenhams.

The boundary with Mole Valley moved slightly the uninhabited portions of land by the M25 motorway adjoining Ashtead and Leatherhead, in line with local government wards. The Preston ward of Reigate & Banstead (in Tadworth) was transferred to Reigate.

=== Current ===
Further to the 2023 Periodic Review of Westminster constituencies which came into effect for the 2024 general election, the constituency is defined as being composed of the following as they existed on 1 December 2020:

- The Borough of Epsom and Ewell.
- The District of Mole Valley wards of: Ashtead Common; Ashtead Park; Ashtead Village; Leatherhead North; Leatherhead South.

Following a local government boundary review in Mole Valley which came into effect in May 2023, the constituency now comprises the following from the 2024 general election:

- The Borough of Epsom and Ewell.
- The District of Mole Valley wards of Ashtead Lanes & Common, Ashtead Park, Leatherhead North, and Leatherhead South.

The electorate was reduced to bring it within the permitted range by transferring the parts in the Borough of Reigate and Banstead to Reigate. To partly compensate, Leatherhead was transferred from the abolished constituency of Mole Valley (its main successor being Dorking and Horley).

== Members of Parliament ==
Election	Member	Party
Feb 1974	Peter Rawlinson	Conservative
1978 by-election	Sir Archie Hamilton	Conservative
2001	Chris Grayling	Conservative
2024	Helen Maguire	Liberal Democrats

== Elections ==
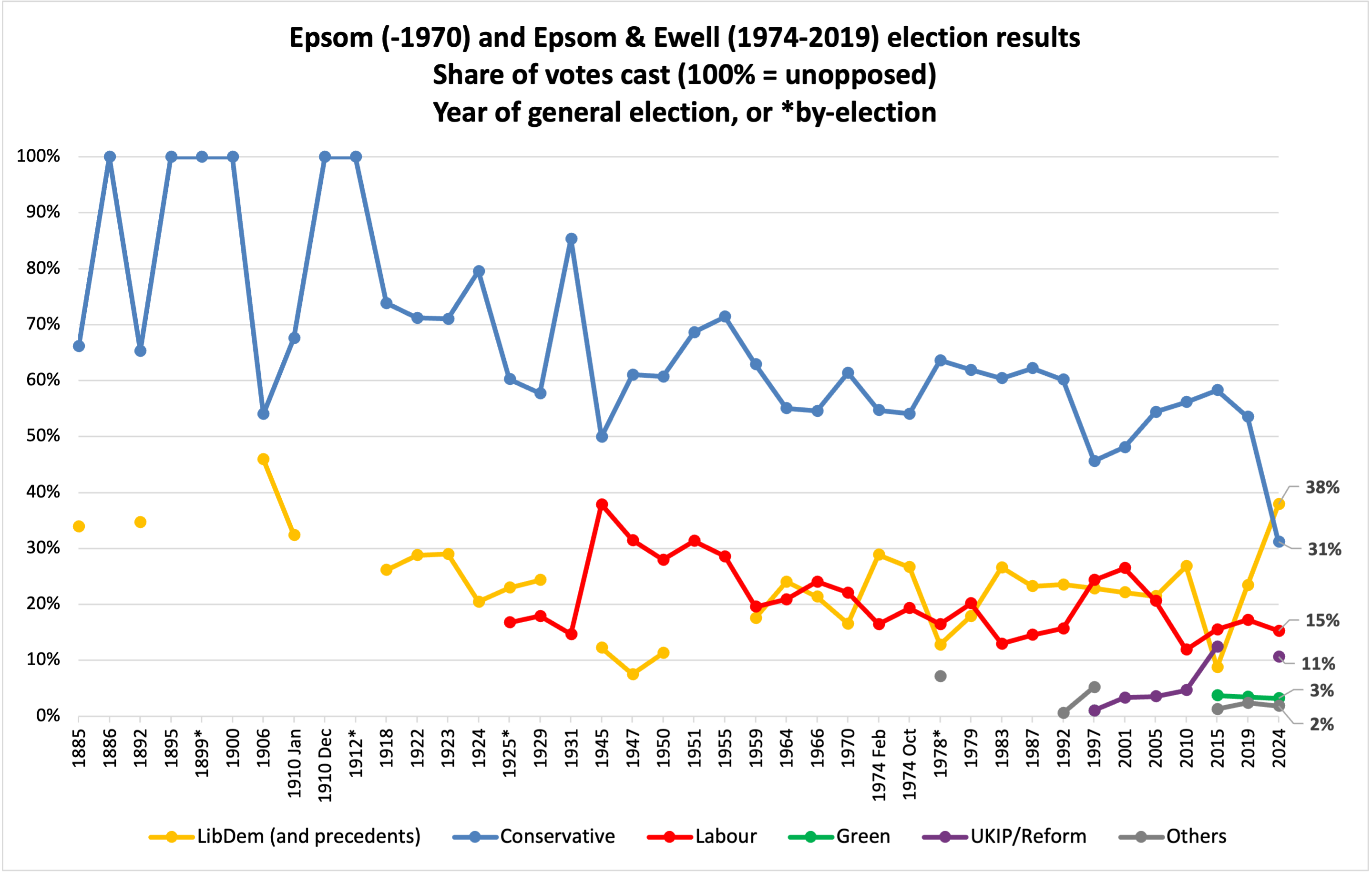
Epsom (−1970) and Epsom & Ewell (1974–2024) election results

=== Elections in the 2020s ===
2024 general election: Epsom and Ewell
Party	Candidate	Votes	%	±%
Liberal Democrats	Helen Maguire	20,674	37.9	+13.7
Conservative	Mhairi Fraser	16,988	31.2	−22.4
Labour	Mark Todd	8,325	15.3	−1.5
Reform	Mayuran Senthilnathan	5,795	10.6	New
Green	Stephen McKenna	1,745	3.2	−0.1
True & Fair	Gina Miller	845	1.6	New
SDP	Damon Young	153	0.3	New
Majority		3,686	6.7	N/A
Turnout		54,525	70.3	−4.4
Registered electors		77,530		
Liberal Democrats gain from Conservative		Swing	+18.1	

=== Elections in the 2010s ===
2019 notional result
Party	Vote	%
Conservative	30,752	53.6
Liberal Democrats	13,896	24.2
Labour	9,653	16.8
Green	1,896	3.3
Others	1,200	2.1
Turnout	57,397	74.7
Electorate	76,844	

2019 general election: Epsom and Ewell
Party	Candidate	Votes	%	±%
Conservative	Chris Grayling	31,819	53.5	−6.1
Liberal Democrats	Stephen Gee	13,946	23.5	+11.0
Labour	Ed Mayne	10,226	17.2	−7.8
Green	Janice Baker	2,047	3.4	+0.5
Independent	Clive Woodbridge	1,413	2.4	New
Majority		17,873	30.0	−4.6
Turnout		59,451	73.3	−0.8
Conservative hold		Swing	−8.5	

2017 general election: Epsom and Ewell
Party	Candidate	Votes	%	±%
Conservative	Chris Grayling	35,313	59.6	+1.3
Labour	Ed Mayne	14,838	25.0	+9.5
Liberal Democrats	Stephen Gee	7,401	12.5	+3.7
Green	Janice Baker	1,714	2.9	−0.8
Majority		20,475	34.6	−8.2
Turnout		59,468	74.1	+1.4
Conservative hold		Swing	−4.1	

2015 general election: Epsom and Ewell
Party	Candidate	Votes	%	±%
Conservative	Chris Grayling	33,309	58.3	+2.1
Labour	Sheila Carlson	8,866	15.5	+3.6
UKIP	Robert Leach	7,117	12.5	+7.9
Liberal Democrats	Stephen Gee	5,002	8.8	−18.0
Green	Susan McGrath	2,116	3.7	New
Independent	Lionel Blackman	612	1.1	New
Independent	Gareth Harfoot	121	0.2	New
Majority		24,443	42.8	+13.4
Turnout		57,143	72.7	+2.3
Conservative hold		Swing	+4.1	

2010 general election: Epsom and Ewell
Party	Candidate	Votes	%	±%
Conservative	Chris Grayling	30,868	56.2	+1.8
Liberal Democrats	Jonathan Lees	14,734	26.8	+5.3
Labour	Craig Montgomery	6,538	11.9	−8.1
UKIP	Elizabeth Wallace	2,549	4.6	+1.1
Radical Reform	Peter Ticher	266	0.5	New
Majority		16,134	29.4	−3.5
Turnout		54,955	70.4	+4.1
Conservative hold		Swing	−1.8	

=== Elections in the 2000s ===
2005 general election: Epsom and Ewell
Party	Candidate	Votes	%	±%
Conservative	Chris Grayling	27,146	54.4	+6.3
Liberal Democrats	Jonathan Lees	10,699	21.4	−0.7
Labour	Charlie Mansell	10,265	20.6	−5.9
UKIP	Peter Kefford	1,769	3.5	+0.2
Majority		16,447	33.0	+11.4
Turnout		49,879	66.1	+3.3
Conservative hold		Swing	+3.5	

2001 general election: Epsom and Ewell
Party	Candidate	Votes	%	±%
Conservative	Chris Grayling	22,430	48.1	+2.5
Labour	Charlie Mansell	12,350	26.5	+2.2
Liberal Democrats	John Vincent	10,316	22.1	−0.7
UKIP	Graham Webster-Gardiner	1,547	3.3	+2.3
Majority		10,080	21.6	+0.3
Turnout		46,643	62.8	−11.2
Conservative hold		Swing	+0.1	

=== Elections in the 1990s ===
1997 general election: Epsom and Ewell
Party	Candidate	Votes	%	±%
Conservative	Archie Hamilton	24,717	45.6	−14.6
Labour	Philip Woodford	13,192	24.3	+8.6
Liberal Democrats	John Vincent	12,380	22.8	−0.7
Referendum	Christopher Macdonald	2,355	4.3	New
UKIP	Harold Green	544	1.0	New
Green	Hugo Charlton	527	1.0	New
ProLife Alliance	Katherine Weeks	466	0.9	New
Majority		11,525	21.3	−15.4
Turnout		54,181	74.0	−6.1
Conservative hold		Swing		

1992 general election: Epsom and Ewell
Party	Candidate	Votes	%	±%
Conservative	Archie Hamilton	32,861	60.2	−2.0
Liberal Democrats	Martin P. Emerson	12,840	23.5	+0.3
Labour	Richard A. Warren	8,577	15.7	+1.2
Natural Law	GD Hatchard	334	0.6	New
Majority		20,021	36.7	−2.3
Turnout		54,612	80.1	+4.7
Conservative hold		Swing	−1.2	

=== Elections in the 1980s ===
1987 general election: Epsom and Ewell
Party	Candidate	Votes	%	±%
Conservative	Archie Hamilton	33,145	62.2	+1.8
Liberal	Margaret Joachim	12,384	23.2	−3.4
Labour	Barbara Follett	7,751	14.6	+1.6
Majority		20,761	39.0	+5.2
Turnout		53,280	75.4	+3.4
Conservative hold		Swing	+2.6	

1983 general election: Epsom and Ewell
Party	Candidate	Votes	%	±%
Conservative	Archie Hamilton	30,737	60.4	
Liberal	Michael Anderson	13,542	26.6	
Labour	William Carpenter	6,587	13.0	
Majority		17,195	33.8	
Turnout		50,866	72.0	−4.9
Conservative hold		Swing		

=== Elections in the 1970s ===
1979 general election: Epsom and Ewell
Party	Candidate	Votes	%	±%
Conservative	Archie Hamilton	39,104	61.91	+7.85
Liberal	Michael Anderson	12,746	20.18	−6.45
Labour	Chris Smith	11,315	17.91	−1.40
Majority		26,358	41.73	+14.31
Turnout		63,165	76.91	+3.21
Conservative hold		Swing		

1978 Epsom and Ewell by-election
Party	Candidate	Votes	%	±%
Conservative	Archie Hamilton	28,242	63.61	+9.55
Labour	Anthony Mooney	7,314	16.47	−2.84
Liberal	Michael Alexander John Anderson	5,673	12.78	−13.85
Royalist	Jonathan King	2,350	5.29	New
National Front	James Sawyer	823	1.85	New
Majority		20,928	47.14	+19.72
Turnout		44,402		
Conservative hold		Swing		

October 1974 general election: Epsom and Ewell
Party	Candidate	Votes	%	±%
Conservative	Peter Rawlinson	32,109	54.06	
Liberal	David Julian Hardy Griffiths	15,819	26.63	
Labour	Neil Kearney	11,471	19.31	
Majority		16,290	27.43	
Turnout		59,399	73.70	
Conservative hold		Swing		

February 1974 general election: Epsom and Ewell
Party	Candidate	Votes	%	±%
Conservative	Peter Rawlinson	35,823	54.68	−6.73
Liberal	David Julian Hardy Griffiths	18,899	28.85	+12.33
Labour	Neil Kearney	10,787	16.47	−5.59
Majority		16,924	25.83	−13.52
Turnout		65,509	82.0	
Conservative win (new seat)				

== See also ==
- List of parliamentary constituencies in Surrey
- List of parliamentary constituencies in the South East England (region)

== Sources ==
- Election result, 2015 (BBC)
- Election result, 2010 (BBC)
- Election result, 2005 (BBC)
- Election results, 1997 – 2001 (BBC)
- Election results, 1997 – 2001 (Election Demon)
- Election results, 1983 – 1992 (Election Demon)
