= Neil Kearney =

Irish trade unionist (1951-2009)

- Born: 15 March 1951; County Donegal, Ireland
- Died: 19 November 2009 (aged 59); Bangladesh
- Employers: National Union of Tailors and Garment Workers; International Textile, Garment and Leather Workers' Federation

Neil Joseph Kearney (15 March 1950 – 19 November 2009) was an Irish trade union leader.

Born in County Donegal, Kearney moved to the UK when he was 17 years old, and found work in a bank. He began working for the National Union of Tailors and Garment Workers in 1972, heading its information and research department for many years. He was also active in the Labour Party, standing in Epsom and Ewell at the February and October 1974 UK general elections, taking third place on each occasion. In 1978, he was elected as a councillor in the London Borough of Kensington and Chelsea, becoming leader of the opposition.

In 1988, Kearney was elected as general secretary of the International Textile, Garment and Leather Workers' Federation. During his time in office, much work in the industry moved to less developed countries, which affected the federation's finances. Kearney focused on supporting workers in those nations, campaigning to end child labour, and for improved health and safety. He won the Il Natale, La Notta della Vita award in 1998, for his work opposing child labour, and in 1999 he won the Work and Environment Award from the Associazione Ambiente e Lavoro.

Kearney also served on the board of the Ethical Trading Initiative, and on the advisory board of the Social Accountability International, where he was heavily involved in developing the SA8000 standard.

Kearney visited Bangladesh particularly often, and died there while on a four-day trip in 2009. On his death, three days of mourning were declared in the country's textile and garment industry.

Trade union offices
Preceded by Charles Ford	General Secretary of the International Textile, Garment and Leather Workers' Federation; 1988–2009	Succeeded by Patrick Itschert
