= Helen Maguire =

British politician (born 1977)

Helen Maguire BEM MP
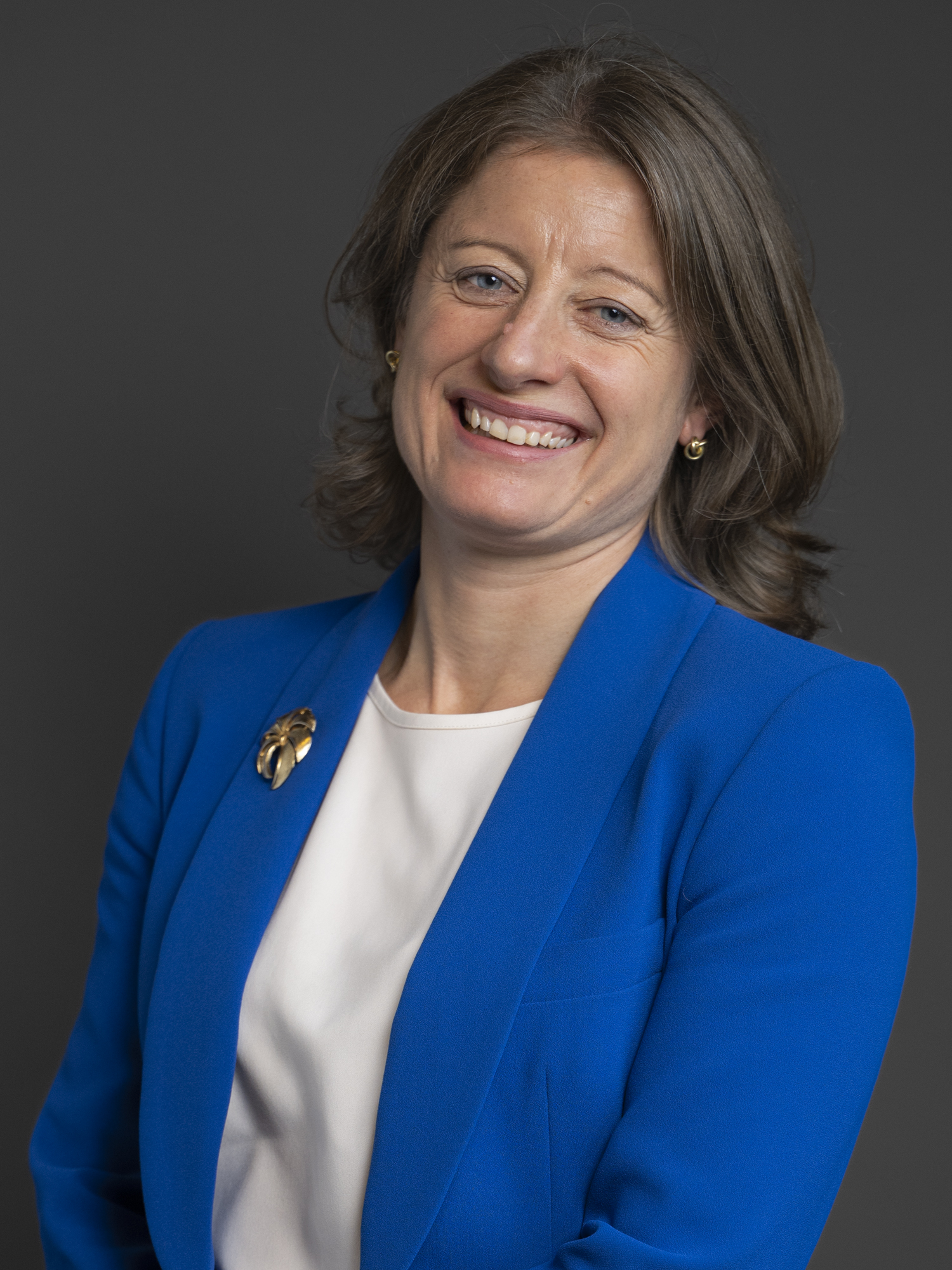
- Official portrait, 2024

Member of Parliament for Epsom and Ewell
- Incumbent
- Assumed office 4 July 2024
- Preceded by: Chris Grayling
- Majority: 3,686 (6.7%)

Liberal Democrat portfolios
- 2024–2025: Defence
- 2025–present: Primary Care and Cancer

Personal details
- Born: 11 July 1977 (age 49)
- Party: Liberal Democrats
- Education: Royal Military Academy Sandhurst

Military service
- Allegiance: United Kingdom
- Branch/service: British Army
- Years of service: 2002–2005
- Rank: Captain
- Unit: Royal Military Police

Helen Elaine Maguire (born 11 July 1977) is a British Liberal Democrat politician who has been Member of Parliament (MP) for Epsom and Ewell since 2024. Before entering politics, Maguire served in the British Army with the Royal Military Police and worked as a fundraiser and fitness instructor.

== Early life and career ==
Maguire studied French and German at university. She gained her officer's commission from the Royal Military Academy Sandhurst. A former Captain in the Royal Military Police, she served in Bosnia on a Stabilisation Force mission, and in Iraq to help rebuild the Iraqi Police and provide on-the-ground counter-insurgency policing support to infantry.

After leaving the army, Maguire worked as a personal fitness instructor and founded a fitness company. She became a chartered fundraiser in 2016 and later ran a fundraising consultancy business.

Maguire received the British Empire Medal (BEM) in the 2023 Birthday Honours for services to the community in Claygate, Surrey (in the neighbouring constituency of Esher and Walton). She lives in Surrey with her husband and three children.

== Parliamentary career ==
Maguire won the seat of Epsom and Ewell in the 2024 general election with 20,674 votes (37.9 per cent), gaining a majority of 3,686 over the second-placed Conservative candidate. The seat had previously been held by Conservative Chris Grayling, who had announced in October 2023 that he would not stand for re-election.

On 18 September 2024 Maguire was appointed by Liberal Democrat Leader Ed Davey as the party spokesperson for Defence as part of his Frontbench Team.

Parliament of the United Kingdom
Preceded by Chris Grayling	Member of Parliament for Epsom and Ewell; 2024–present	Incumbent
