= Helen Edwards (civil servant) =

British civil servant

Helen Edwards CB CBE
- Born: 2 August 1953 (age 72)
- Education: University of Sussex; University of Warwick
- Occupation: Civil servant

Helen Edwards CB CBE (born 2 August 1953) is a British civil servant, currently serving as the Director-General for Localism in the Department for Communities and Local Government.

== Career ==
Having originally trained and worked as a social worker for East Sussex County Council, Edwards worked for the Save the Children Fund in the London Borough of Lambeth from 1980 to 1983. She then spent 18 years working at Nacro, the national crime reduction charity, where she undertook a variety of roles, ending up as Chief Executive.

Edwards joined the Home Office in 2002 as Director of the Active Communities Directorate. From January 2004, she was promoted to the post of Director-General of the Communities Group where she was responsible for the Home Office's work on volunteering, the voluntary and community sector, race equality, faith, community cohesion and civil renewal. She took over as Chief Executive of National Offender Management Service (NOMS) on 10 November 2005, following the resignation of Martin Narey. During this period, NOMS transferred from the Home Office to the Ministry of Justice, as part of a government reorganisation. On 1 April 2008, she became Director-General of Criminal Justice, with Phil Wheatley taking on the role of Director-General of NOMS. She left this role in 2013, and was replaced by Antonia Romeo.

Edwards took up her role as Director General for Localism for the Department for Communities and Local Government (DCLG) on 7 May 2013, replacing David Prout.

As of 2015, Edwards was paid a salary of between £165,000 and £169,999 by DCLG, making her one of the 328 most highly paid people in the British public sector at that time.

In April 2016, Edwards took up the role of chair of a new group of charities called Recovery Focus, which brings together a coalition of mental health and substance use charities such as Richmond Fellowship and Aquarius.

On 12 November 2019, she was appointed a non-executive director of South London NHS Foundation Trust and began work in March 2020.

== Personal life ==
Edwards has a BA in social science from the University of Sussex and an MA and CQSW from the University of Warwick, and an Honorary Doctorate from Middlesex University. She has been a Fellow of the Royal Society of Arts since 1997, and a Trustee of the Washington-based Eisenhower Foundation since 2000. She married David John Rounds in 1987, with whom she has three sons.

Edwards was appointed Commander of the Order of the British Empire (CBE) in the 2001 New Year Honours and Companion of the Order of the Bath (CB) in the 2012 Birthday Honours.

Government offices
Unknown	Director-General, Communities Group; Home Office; 2004–2005	Unknown
Preceded by Martin Narey	Chief Executive; National Offender; Management Service; 2005–2008	Succeeded by Phil Wheatley; As Director-General, National Offender; Management Service
Unknown	Director-General, Justice Policy; Ministry of Justice; 2008–2013	Succeeded by Antonia Romeo
Preceded by David Prout	Director-General, Localism; Department for Communities and Local Government; 2013–present	Incumbent
