= Michael Spurr =

Michael Spurr CB

Chief Executive of HM Prison and Probation Service
- In office 8 June 2010 – March 2019
- Preceded by: Phil Wheatley
- Succeeded by: Jo Farrar

Personal details
- Born: 20 September 1961 (age 65)
- Citizenship: United Kingdom
- Education: Durham University
- Profession: Prison officer
- Salary: £145,000 – £149,999 (2010)

Michael Spurr, CB (born 20 September 1961) was the Chief Executive of HM Prison and Probation Service 2010–2019. He joined HM Prison Service in 1983 as a prison officer, before training to become a Governor a year later. He became Chief Executive of the National Offender Management Service in 2010 (later renamed HM Prison and Probation Service), retiring in 2019.

== Early life ==
Spurr graduated from St Chad's College, Durham University with a BA in Economics and Economic History. At the time of graduating from University, he was running a youth club, and following the suggestion of his careers advisor to look at the prison service, he felt that becoming a borstal house master would be a good idea, and so signed up.

== Career ==
Spurr joined the Prison Service in 1983, the same year that borstals were abolished, initially as a prison officer in HMP Leeds. He then moved to HMP Stanford Hill to begin training as an Assistant Governor after a year. Following the completion of his training he transferred to HMP Swaleside, before becoming Deputy Governor of HMYOI Aylesbury and then Governing Governor of the same establishment in 1993.

His subsequent career included posts of Governing Governor at Wayland and Norwich prisons, Area Manager of Eastern Region, and various posts in HQ, before becoming Deputy Director General of the Prison Service in 2006. Following the reorganisation of the National Offender Management Service (NOMS) in 2008, he took on the role of Chief Operating Officer, with responsibility for delivery of operations for prisons and probation. He became Chief Executive of NOMS on 8 June 2010.

Spurr was appointed Companion of the Order of the Bath (CB) in the 2014 Birthday Honours for services to offender management.

Spurr's time in office was marked by sharp deterioration in many prisons. Assaults and self harm more than doubled (Ministry of Justice 'Safer custody statistics'). In 2017–18, 1 in 8 prisons were rated as causing serious concern (Ministry of Justice, 'Annual Prison Performance Ratings 2017-18). A new procedure for the Chief Inspector to send an urgent notification of severe problems to the Secretary of State was introduced in November 2017, and was used 4 times in a year.

Against this background, in 2018 Spurr was told to step down by the Permanent Secretary of the Ministry of Justice, Richard Heaton, who said he felt a new direction was needed.

However most observers commented that these problems were the result of Ministerial decisions, not his leadership - particularly, the decision to cut operational staff in prisons by almost a third while not reducing prisoner numbers, and to cut starting pay for officers thus making recruitment and retention more difficult. A former Lord Chancellor commented: "Michael Spurr is a terrific impressive decent public servant who has given his working life to prison and probation, and has been dealt as shitty a hand by the government as it is possible to deal".
