= Martin Narey =

British special adviser

Sir Martin James Narey DL (born 5 August 1955, in Middlesbrough) is a largely retired Civil Servant, Charity CEO and advisor to the British Government. He served as director general of the Prison Service of England and Wales between 1998 and 2003, and chief executive of the National Offender Management Service from 2003 to 2005. He was as chief executive officer of the charity Barnardo's from 2005 to 2011. In 2013 he was appointed as a special advisor to the education secretary Michael Gove and advised numerous Secretaries of State and Prime Minister, David Cameron about issues relating to child neglect. In 2003 he was awarded the Chartered Institute of Management's Gold Medal, an annual award recognising outstanding leadership. He was the first public sector recipient for 10 years.

== Early life ==
Narey was born in 1955 in Middlesbrough, England. He was educated at St Mary's College, a Catholic comprehensive school in Middlesbrough. He studied at Sheffield Polytechnic.

== Career ==
Narey joined Her Majesty's Prison Service in 1982 and began prison governor training. He was the Director General of the Prison Service of England and Wales between 1998 and 2003 before becoming the first Chief Executive of the National Offender Management Service (NOMS). In 2005, he left the Civil Service to become chief executive officer of Barnardo's before stepping down in January 2011. As Director General of Prisons he has been credited with "invoking moral principles rather than security concerns when articulating the Service's priorities".

He is a visiting professor in applied social sciences at Durham University, and a visiting professor at Sheffield Hallam University.

From 2012 to 2013, he served as chair of The Portman Group Independent Complaints Panel, overseeing complaints into the naming, packaging, promotion and sponsorship of alcoholic drinks in the UK, and from 2013 to 2019 he served as chair of Portman Group itself.

From 2011 to 2017, he also served as a board member of the Advertising Standards Authority.

From 2001 to 2013 he was the Government's Advisor on Adoption and his advice, based on an independent report commissioned by The Times, led to adoption becoming one of the UK Government's domestic priorities. He summarised the reforms for The Guardian in July 2012.

In February 2013 it was announced that he was taking on a wider role, advising Michael Gove, Secretary of State for Education on children's social care.

== Views ==
Narey believes some social workers do not do enough to prevent child abuse. Narey stated, “Social workers do an outstanding job generally, but some of them need to have more scepticism when they’re dealing with parents who are manipulative and deceitful.” Narey also stated, “One of the flaws is that everyone believes that taking a child into care is a negative step. Because the children in care are, for example, performing badly educationally. But that’s just a profound misunderstanding of what’s happening. Those children do badly in education and other areas because they’ve been neglected at home. The evidence shows that for children who are in need, care has a positive effect...”

== Honours ==
Narey was knighted in the 2013 New Year's Honours 'for services to vulnerable people'.

Civic offices
| Preceded by Richard Tilt | Director-General of HM Prison Service; 1998–2003 | Succeeded by Phil Wheatley |
| New title | Chief Executive of the National Offender Management Service; 2004–2005 | Succeeded by Helen Edwards |
Non-profit organization positions
| Preceded by Roger Singleton | Chief Executive Officer Barnardo's; 2005–2010 | Succeeded by Anne Marie Carrie |
