= Community Rehabilitation Company =

Community Rehabilitation Company (CRC) was the term given to a private-sector supplier of Probation and Prison-based rehabilitative services for offenders in England and Wales to replace the existing Probation Service. A number of CRCs were established in 2015 as part of the Ministry of Justice's (MoJ) Transforming Rehabilitation (TR) strategy for the reform of offender rehabilitation.

The reform was not a success. In a review of 11 areas of government outsourcing by the Institute for Government, probation was the sole area which achieved a "red" status indicating "consistent evidence of cost increases or lower performance or quality". In June 2020 the government announced it would terminate all CRC contracts by June 2021 and services would be transferred to the reformed Probation Service run by the government.

== Transforming Rehabilitation ==
A 2013 White Paper, "Transforming Rehabilitation: A Strategy for Reform" set out the government's intention to outsource the supervision and rehabilitation of low and medium risk of serious harm offenders to Community Rehabilitation Companies to be established by the private and charitable sector. The intention was that their work would replace that done by existing Probation Trusts in England and Wales; and that in addition CRCs would have responsibility for the supervision of the rehabilitation of offenders serving short-term prison sentences. A separate public-sector National Probation Service was to be established to manage the supervision and rehabilitation of medium and high risk of serious harm offenders. Legislation was passed in the form of the Offender Rehabilitation Act 2014 to enable changes to the statutory basis for offender supervision to support the proposed reforms.

== CRCs ==
Over the course of 2013 and 2014 MoJ established 21 geographical Contract Package Areas to cover England and Wales, and devised a contractual framework and bidding process by which contracts for each area might be let to a CRC.

In June 2014, staff of existing Probation Trusts were allocated either the new National Probation Service, or else to the notional CRC that was to assume control of offenders in the Trust area, with the intention that staff allocated to CRCs would be transferred (TUPed) across to actual CRCs upon their formation. The bidding process came to an end and CRC contracts were let in December 2014, with the new regime coming into full effect in February 2015.
