= Chris Grayling =

British politician (born 1962)

The Right Honourable The Lord Grayling PC
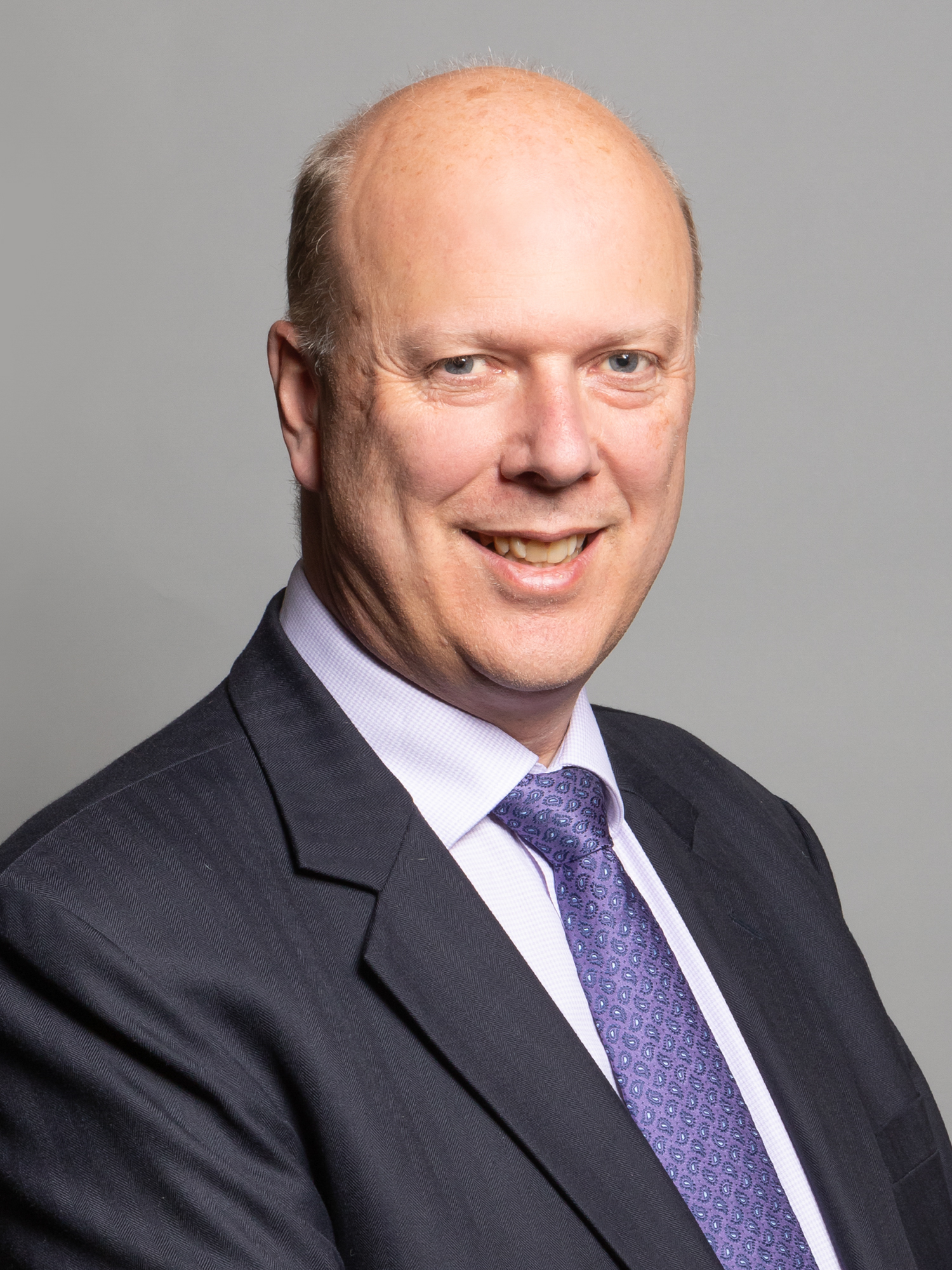
- Official portrait, 2020

Secretary of State for Transport
- In office 14 July 2016 – 24 July 2019
- Prime Minister: Theresa May
- Preceded by: Patrick McLoughlin
- Succeeded by: Grant Shapps

Leader of the House of Commons
- In office 9 May 2015 – 13 July 2016
- Prime Minister: David Cameron
- Preceded by: William Hague
- Succeeded by: David Lidington

Lord President of the Council
- In office 9 May 2015 – 14 July 2016
- Prime Minister: David Cameron
- Preceded by: Nick Clegg
- Succeeded by: David Lidington

Secretary of State for Justice; Lord Chancellor
- In office 4 September 2012 – 9 May 2015
- Prime Minister: David Cameron
- Preceded by: Kenneth Clarke
- Succeeded by: Michael Gove

Minister of State for Employment
- In office 13 May 2010 – 4 September 2012
- Prime Minister: David Cameron
- Preceded by: Jim Knight
- Succeeded by: Mark Hoban
Shadow Cabinet positions
Shadow Home Secretary
In office 19 January 2009 – 11 May 2010
Leader	David Cameron
Preceded by	Dominic Grieve
Succeeded by	Alan Johnson
Shadow Secretary of State for Work and Pensions
In office 2 July 2007 – 19 January 2009
Leader	David Cameron
Preceded by	Philip Hammond
Succeeded by	Theresa May
Shadow Secretary of State for Transport
In office 6 December 2005 – 2 July 2007
Leader	David Cameron
Preceded by	Tim Yeo
Succeeded by	Theresa Villiers
Shadow Leader of the House of Commons
In office 10 May 2005 – 6 December 2005
Leader	Michael Howard
Preceded by	Oliver Heald
Succeeded by	Theresa May

Member of the House of Lords
- Lord Temporal
- Life peerage 20 August 2024

Member of Parliament for Epsom and Ewell
- In office 7 June 2001 – 30 May 2024
- Preceded by: Archie Hamilton
- Succeeded by: Helen Maguire

Member of Merton London Borough Council for Hillside
- In office May 1998 – May 2002

Personal details
- Born: Christopher Stephen Grayling; 1 April 1962 (age 64) London, England
- Party: Conservative (1988–present)
- Other political affiliations: SDP (before 1988)
- Spouse: Susan Dillistone
- Children: 2
- Education: Sidney Sussex College, Cambridge

Christopher Stephen Grayling, Baron Grayling, PC (born 1 April 1962), is a British politician and author who served as Secretary of State for Justice from 2012 to 2015, Leader of the House of Commons from 2015 to 2016 and Secretary of State for Transport from 2016 until 2019. A member of the Conservative Party, he served as Member of Parliament (MP) for Epsom and Ewell from 2001 to 2024. Before entering politics, Grayling worked in the television and film industry.

Grayling was born in London and studied history at Cambridge University. He wrote a number of books as well as working for the BBC and Channel 4 before going into politics. A member of the Social Democratic Party until 1988, he then joined the Conservatives. First elected to Parliament in the 2001 general election for Epsom and Ewell, he was appointed to the Shadow Cabinet of David Cameron in 2005 as Shadow Secretary of State for Transport. In 2007, he became the Shadow Secretary of State for Work and Pensions, and in 2009 he was appointed Shadow Home Secretary.

Following the 2010 general election and the formation of the Cameron–Clegg coalition, Grayling was made Minister of State for Employment. In September 2012, he was appointed to the Cabinet as Lord Chancellor and Secretary of State for Justice and served until 2015. He was the first non-lawyer to have served as Lord Chancellor for at least 440 years. He was Leader of the House of Commons and the Lord President of the Council from 2015 to 2016. In the majority and minority May governments, Grayling served as Secretary of State for Transport.

Grayling stood down from the Cabinet when Boris Johnson became Prime Minister in July 2019. Johnson hoped for Grayling to become Chair of the Intelligence and Security Committee by being voted in by the Conservative majority on the committee. However, fellow Conservative Julian Lewis defeated Grayling in the ballot by using opposition votes to secure a majority, in what was seen as a blow to Johnson and his adviser Dominic Cummings. Six weeks later, Grayling resigned from the committee apparently due to his failure to become chair. He stood down at the 2024 general election and was appointed to the House of Lords.

== Early life and career ==
Grayling was born in London and grew up in Buckinghamshire, where he was educated at the Royal Grammar School, High Wycombe. He then went to Sidney Sussex College, Cambridge, where he graduated with an upper-second class Bachelor of Arts degree in history in 1984.

Grayling joined BBC News in 1985 as a trainee, becoming a producer in 1986. He left the BBC in 1988 to join Channel 4 as an editor on its Business Daily television programme. He rejoined the BBC in 1991 as a business development manager on BBC Select. On leaving the BBC again in 1993, he briefly joined Charterhouse Productions as managing director before leaving several months later as it was wound up for failing to pay VAT. He ran several television production companies from late 1993, including managing the corporate communications division of Workhouse Ltd from 1992 to 1995 and SSVC Group in Gerrards Cross from 1995 to 1997.

Grayling became a public relations consultant in 1997 with Burson Marsteller, where he remained until his election to Parliament. Prior to joining the Conservative Party, Grayling was a member of the Social Democratic Party (SDP).

== Early political career ==
=== Borough councillor: 1998–2002 ===
Grayling was selected to contest the Labour-held marginal seat of Warrington South at the 1997 general election, but was defeated by Labour candidate Helen Southworth by 10,807 votes. He was elected as a councillor for the Hillside ward in the London Borough of Merton in 1998 and remained on the council until 2002.

=== Elected Member of Parliament: 2001 ===
Grayling was elected to the House of Commons to represent the Surrey seat of Epsom and Ewell at the 2001 general election following the retirement of the veteran Tory MP Archie Hamilton. Grayling held the seat with a majority of 10,080 and has been returned as MP there since. He made his maiden speech on 25 June 2001. In 2019, Grayling announced that Stoneleigh train station was to be given step-free access.

=== Shadow Cabinet: 2001–2010 ===
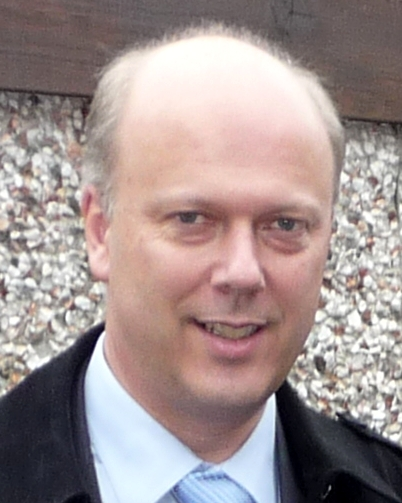
Grayling as Shadow Home Secretary in 2009

Grayling served on the Environment, Transport and the Regions Select committee from 2001 until he was promoted to the Opposition Whips' Office by Iain Duncan Smith in 2002, moving to become a Spokesman for Health later in the year. He became a Spokesman for Education and Skills by Michael Howard in 2003.

Following the 2005 general election, he became a member of Howard's Shadow Cabinet as Shadow Leader of the House of Commons and, after the election of David Cameron as the leader of the Conservative Party, in December 2005, he served as the Shadow Secretary of State for Transport. In June 2007, he was made Shadow Secretary of State for Work and Pensions, a post he held until January 2009 when he became Shadow Home Secretary.

Grayling became known as a national politician through his "attack dog" pressure on leading Labour politicians. He was heavily involved in the questioning of David Blunkett, the then Work and Pensions Secretary, over his business affairs, which led to Blunkett's resignation in 2005.

Grayling challenged Tony Blair and his wife Cherie over the money they made from lectures while Blair was Prime Minister. He also challenged minister Stephen Byers over his handling of the Railtrack collapse.

==== Role in the expenses scandal ====
Between 2001 and 2009, Grayling claimed expenses for his flat in Pimlico, close to the Houses of Parliament, despite having a constituency home no further than 17 miles away. Grayling said he uses the flat when "working very late" because he needs to "work very erratic and late hours most days when the House of Commons is sitting." During the Parliamentary expenses scandal, The Daily Telegraph reported that Grayling refitted and redecorated the flat in 2005 costing over £5,000. Grayling's expenses issue was seen as embarrassing for the Conservative Party as he had previously criticised Labour ministers for being implicated in sleaze scandals.

In 2010, it was reported by the Daily Telegraph that an IP address associated with the Parliamentary estate had been discovered attempting to remove references to Chris Grayling's role in the expenses scandal from his Wikipedia page. They attempted the edit to remove the information 5 times and later received a warning from a Wikipedia administrator.

==== Comparing Moss Side to The Wire ====
As Shadow Home Secretary, Grayling provoked controversy in August 2009 when he compared Manchester's Moss Side area to the American TV crime drama The Wire. His comments received an angry response from some Manchester locals and criticism from the police. Having been out on patrol for a day with the police, observing the results of a shooting at a house, he described himself as having witnessed an "urban war". Police responded that gang-related shootings in Greater Manchester had fallen by 82 per cent from the previous year and that to speak of "urban war" was "sensationalistic".

A local councillor, Roy Walters, complained of Moss Side unfairly being a "negative target" due to historical associations. Defending his comments, Grayling said, "I didn't say Moss Side equals Baltimore. What I said is that we have in Moss Side symptoms of a gang conflict in this country which I find profoundly disturbing." Baltimore, with a population of about 600,000, was noted as having 191 gun related murders in the previous year, in comparison to Moss Side, population 17,537, which had none.

==== Statistics on violent crime ====
Grayling came under criticism as Shadow Home Secretary over the Conservative Party's use of statistics on violent crime. In February 2010, the Conservative Party issued press releases to every constituency in the UK claiming that crime had "risen sharply" in the UK. They failed, however, to take into account the more rigorous system for recording crime. The chairman of the UK Statistics Authority, Sir Michael Scholar, said that the figures Grayling was using were "likely to mislead the public" and "likely to damage public trust in official statistics" as the way in which crime was calculated had been changed in 2002.

A Conservative-commissioned report by the independent House of Commons library suggested that, depending on how figures were calculated, Grayling's claims may have been justifiable and that violent crime may have risen in the period between 1998 and 2009. The incumbent Home Secretary, Alan Johnson, called Grayling's use of crime statistics "dodgy" and said that the British Crime Survey clearly showed that violent crime had reduced by 41% over the same period.

==== Gay couples in B&Bs ====
In March 2010, Grayling was recorded at an open meeting of the Centre for Policy Studies think tank saying that during the debates on civil liberties under the Labour Government, he had felt that Christians should have the right to live by their consciences and that Christian owners of bed and breakfasts should have the right to turn away gay couples. Grayling said:

"I personally always took the view that, if you look at the case of should a Christian hotel owner have the right to exclude a gay couple from a hotel, I took the view that if it's a question of somebody who's doing a B&B in their own home, that individual should have the right to decide who does and who doesn't come into their own home. If they are running a hotel on the high street, I really don't think that it is right in this day and age that a gay couple should walk into a hotel and be turned away because they are a gay couple, and I think that is where the dividing line comes."

When the recording was released by The Observer, on 3 April 2010, Grayling's comments caused an angry response from gay rights campaigners, with Ben Summerskill, Chief Executive of the gay rights group Stonewall, saying that this position would be "illegal" and "very alarming to a lot of gay people who may have been thinking of voting Conservative". Peter Mandelson, the most senior gay minister in the (then Labour) Government, added that the comment showed that the Conservative Party had not changed, that "when the camera is on they say one thing, but when the camera is off they say another". Conservative Party leader David Cameron was subsequently urged to "back or sack" Grayling, with gay rights campaigner Peter Tatchell saying that "Cameron's silence is worrying. Many voters – gay and straight – will be disturbed by his failure to swiftly disown Grayling's support for homophobic discrimination. What does this say about the sincerity and seriousness of his commitment to gay equality?"

Anastasia Beaumont-Bott, founder of LGBTory, a gay rights group which campaigns for the Conservatives, announced that she would be voting for Labour, not the Conservatives, in response to Grayling's comments. She said, "I feel guilty because as a gay woman affected by LGBT rights I am on record saying you should vote Conservative, and I want to reverse that. I want to go on record to say don't vote Conservative. I'd go as far to say that I'll vote Labour at this general election." Beaumont-Bott was joined in defecting from the Conservatives to Labour a week later by gay rights campaigner David Heathcote. Grayling's comments were defended by a number of commentators, including the Today Programme presenter and gay broadcaster Evan Davis and leading Christian groups.

Grayling apologised on 9 April 2010, saying: "I am sorry if what I said gave the wrong impression, I certainly didn't intend to offend anyone... I voted for gay rights, I voted for this particular measure." Various commentators speculated that he might have been "hidden away" by his party when he made relatively few public appearances in the days of the general election campaign that followed. It is unclear whether his remarks were the reason that David Cameron chose to appoint Theresa May as Home Secretary in his new Cabinet, rather than Grayling who held the position in the Shadow Cabinet; Grayling was not given any Cabinet post, as had been predicted by some media commentators prior to the election. On 31 January 2013, it was reported that Grayling would vote in favour of same-sex marriage in England and Wales.

== Early ministerial career ==
On 13 May 2010, Grayling was appointed Minister of State for Employment and was sworn into the Privy Council on 28 May. As minister at DWP he was responsible for jobcentres. Measures were introduced to reduce costs, leaving 100,000 staff redundant in offices around the country. In the context of a "Broken Society" he accused some families of being habitually unemployed, generation after generation, living in sink council estates in the inner cities. In the October 2010 Spending Review, the government made cuts to the DWP budget in order to constrain welfare spending.

The policy later informed treatment of prisoners, refusing the right to vote, and clamping down on abusive behaviours in jails. He announced work programmes for prisoners, encouraged an end to the "something for nothing culture". More people than ever were found fit to work as part of a package of measures in a £5 billion program to make work for the long-term unemployed.

== Cabinet-level minister ==
Grayling was promoted to the Cabinet on 4 September 2012, as Lord Chancellor and Secretary of State for Justice. Sworn in as Lord Chancellor on 1 October 2012 at Westminster Abbey, he was elected an Honorary Bencher of Gray's Inn on 11 December 2012, due in part to his lack of legal qualifications. He was the first non-lawyer to have served as Lord Chancellor for at least 440 years. (It was reported that the last such non-lawyer was the Earl of Shaftesbury in 1672–73; but the Earl was admitted to Lincoln's Inn in 1638.)

Grayling's appointment was widely seen as a return to a more hard line approach than that of his predecessor, Clarke. Grayling pursued a "tough justice" agenda, including ending automatic early release for terrorists and child rapists, ending simple cautions for serious offences, and introducing greater protections for householders who defend themselves against intruders. The leading human rights barrister Lord Pannick described Grayling's performance as "notable only for his attempts to restrict judicial reviews and human rights, his failure to protect the judiciary against criticism from his colleagues and the reduction of legal aid to a bare minimum."

=== Prisoner reforms ===
One of Grayling's first acts at the Ministry of Justice (MoJ) was to commence a project to change the way offenders were rehabilitated in an effort to cut reoffending rates. Citing the reoffending rates of those serving 12 months or less as his main reason for dismantling the internationally renowned Probation Service, Grayling ignored the fact that this was in fact the one group of offenders with whom Probation had no contact, as they were not released under a supervision licence at that time. Under a system of "payment by results", private companies as well as charities would be offered the chance to bid for contracts to run 70% of the work previously managed by the National Probation Service for England and Wales. Despite widespread opposition from academics, both Houses, legal professionals and unions, the privatisation of 70% of the work took place. Probation retained the most high risk work under new arrangements.

Grayling's ban on books being sent into UK prisons was widely criticised by the Howard League for Penal Reform and the literary establishment, including Philip Pullman, Mark Haddon, Anthony Horowitz, Susan Hill and Emma Donoghue. The ban was described as obscene by Shaun Attwood of the TV show Banged Up Abroad who read over a thousand books in prison and credited books for being the lifeblood of rehabilitation. The move was defended as being not about a ban on books being sent into prison, but about parcels being sent in, as giving prisons access to the latter would almost certainly increase the amount of contraband getting into the prison estate. The High Court ruled the ban illegal in December 2015.

On stepping down from his role as Her Majesty's Chief Inspector of Prisons Nick Harding criticised Grayling for "robustly" interfering with the contents of reports and Grayling's department for using financial controls to influence what was inspected, thereby threatening the independence of the Inspector's role.

In March 2019, the UK National Audit Office issued a report on the reforms of the probation system in England and Wales initiated by Grayling during his tenure at the MoJ stating that the Ministry had "set itself up to fail" through the "rushed implementation" of the reforms. As a result, the MoJ's aim of delivering cuts in reoffending had not been achieved, with reoffending rates having "increased significantly", at a cost £467 million higher than predicted. However, a report released in January 2020 by the MoJ stated that due to the reforms introduced by Grayling, adult and juvenile reoffending rates decreased substantially.

In May 2019, incumbent Justice Secretary, David Gauke, announced offender supervision in England and Wales is to be returned to government control, under the management of the National Probation Service, reversing Grayling's policy. The abolition of Grayling's 'payment by results' system took place in December 2020, terminating the contracts of the private sector providers two years early. During the 2017–18 period 'serious further offences', which include crimes such as murder and rape had increased by 21% compared to the 2016–17 period in June 2019, a study published by the British Sociological Association described the privatisation of the probation system as an "unmitigated disaster" and found that it left the public at greater risk from ex-offenders released from prison.

=== Prison benchmarking and staff cuts ===
A prison "benchmarking" programme was introduced in 2012 by Grayling to reduce the costs of public sector prisons to match comparable private sector prisons, along with associated new core standards intended to result in prisoners having similar amounts of time spent outside their cells across similar prisons. Prison officer numbers were reduced from about 23,000 in 2012 to about 18,000 in 2015.

In 2015, the Justice Select Committee, following a year-long prison inquiry, was critical of Justice ministers for apparent complacency about a 38% rise in prison deaths since 2012. The committee concluded that efficiency savings and staffing shortages had made "a significant contribution to the deterioration in safety" in prisons. The committee commended Grayling for his goal of creating a nationwide network of resettlement prisons. A pioneering scheme to help inmates rehabilitate in the community where they are released.

=== A 'tough justice' agenda: court reforms ===
Grayling's proposed cuts to legal aid were widely criticised by the legal profession. In May 2013, 90 Queen's Counsels signed a letter sent to The Daily Telegraph that branded the cuts "unjust", as they would seriously undermine the rule of law. 6 January 2014 saw the first strike in British history by barristers and solicitors in protest at the cuts. In February 2014, he introduced the Criminal Justice and Courts Act 2015 to the House of Commons. The Bill included measures to outlaw "revenge porn". In October 2014, Grayling unveiled the Conservative Party's proposals for reforms to human rights in order to curb the European Court of Human Rights' influence over British court rulings, whilst honouring the text of the original Convention on Human Rights in a British Bill of Rights and Responsibilities.

In December 2013, Alan Turing was granted a pardon by the Queen, after a process initiated by Grayling in his capacity as Lord Chancellor. In April 2015, Grayling introduced mandatory flat-fee court charges for magistrates' courts, the lowest fee being £150 for a guilty plea. Lawyers feared that defendants may plead guilty to avoid falling into debt, and the president of the Law Society described the change as a threat to fair trials. The charges for the Crown Court were increased to £1,200.

=== Justice department security failure ===
In January 2015, data relating to three fatal police shootings including details of marksmen and the deceased's family were lost in the post by the Justice Department. According to The Guardian it was particularly embarrassing for Grayling as the government was claiming it needed to access personal data to deal with terrorism and could keep it securely. The data included details of the Mark Duggan shooting incident which had triggered the 2011 England riots.

=== Fathers 4 Justice protests ===
On multiple occasions in 2014 and 2015, Fathers 4 Justice protesters targeted Grayling's constituency home in Ashtead, Surrey in January and October 2015. Other incidents included a weekend protest camp set up outside his house by four protesters.

=== Leader of the House of Commons ===
After the 2015 general election, Grayling was appointed Leader of the House of Commons and Lord President of the Council. Michael Gove replaced Grayling as Secretary of State for Justice and Lord Chancellor.

Grayling led Theresa May's campaign for the leadership of the Conservative Party, and thus also as successor to David Cameron as Prime Minister, following Cameron's resignation in June 2016. May won the contest by default following the withdrawal of the only other contender, Andrea Leadsom, after the second round of the leadership ballot.

== Secretary of State for Transport ==
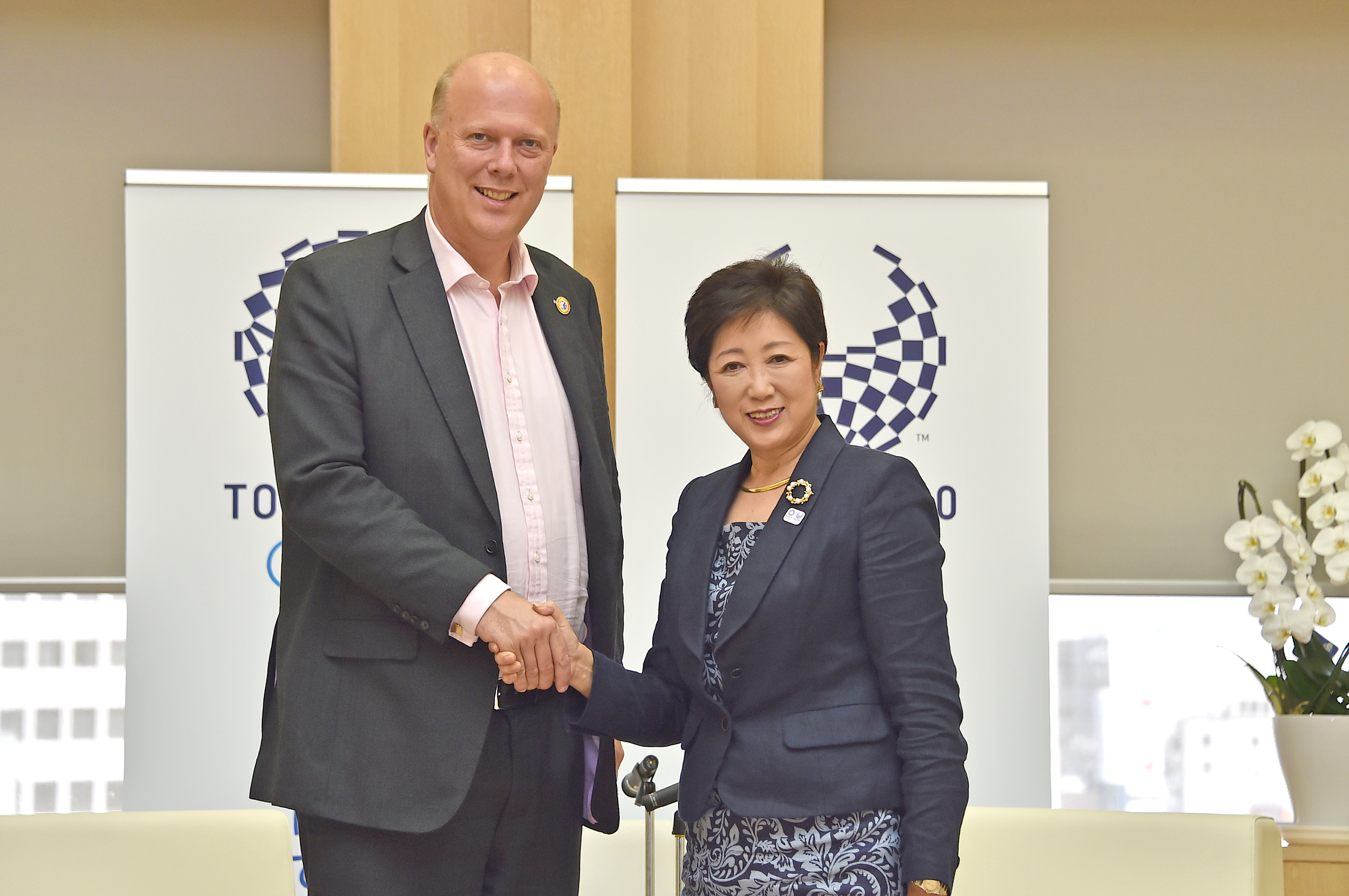
Grayling as Secretary of State for Transport in Tokyo

Grayling was appointed as Secretary of State for Transport when Theresa May became Prime Minister in July 2016. He became criticised for various gaffes and controversies, such as injuring a cyclist by unsafely opening the door of his ministerial car in October 2016 and misspending £2.7 billion of public funds over his tenure as Transport Secretary. Because of such reports, he became known by the moniker "Failing Grayling" used by The Guardian, The Independent, opposition MPs and allegedly his own Cabinet colleagues.

=== London metro services: December 2016 ===
In December 2016, Grayling blocked a move by the Mayor of London Sadiq Khan to give control of the metro services run by Southeastern to Transport for London. A leaked 2013 letter revealed Grayling had previously written to then-London mayor Boris Johnson saying he opposed such a move because it could put those services "in the clutches of a Labour mayor". The leak led to Grayling being accused of putting his party's political interests over those of the public and commuters, as well as members of his own party calling for his resignation.

=== Railway electrification cancellations: 2017–2018 ===
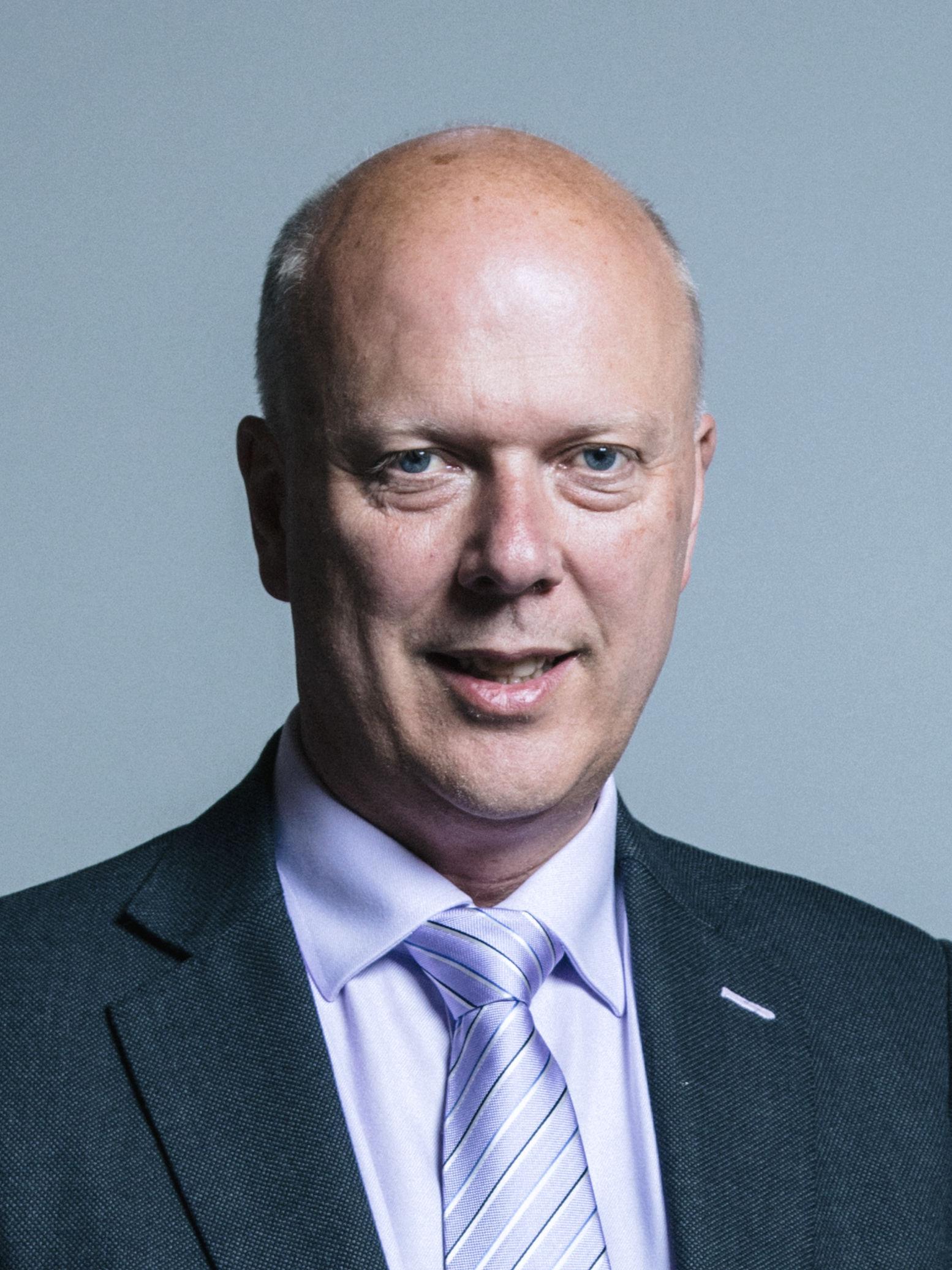
Official portrait of Chris Grayling in 2017

On the last day before parliament closed for its summer recess in 2017, Grayling acknowledged that he had cancelled multiple railway electrification schemes in the north of England that had been promised by David Cameron and George Osborne. In January 2018, Grayling was criticised by railway passengers and by Transport Select Committee members for his decision. In March 2018, it emerged that National Audit Office records showed Grayling to have made the decision several months earlier in 2017 than previously acknowledged, but had suppressed the decision during the 2017 United Kingdom general election and for the remainder of the parliamentary session.

=== Railway timetable change and vote of no confidence: May–June 2018 ===
In summer 2018, problems introducing a new timetable caused widespread disruption and the cancellation of 10% of trains on Northern and Thameslink. The Chief Executive of Govia Thameslink Railway, Charles Horton, resigned, and Grayling faced a vote of confidence in the House of Commons on 19 June 2018, with the resulting division 305–285 in Grayling's favour. Govia Thameslink did not need to pay performance penalties for this disruption after an agreement made in 2017.

=== Gatwick Airport drone incident: December 2018 ===
Following the December 2018 Gatwick Airport drone incident, The Times reported that Grayling had ignored "numerous warnings" about the threat posed by drones, halting draft legislation due for publication in early 2019 thereby allowing civil servants to be diverted to Brexit related tasks. According to The Daily Telegraph, the RAF offered the assistance of a specialist anti-drone team almost immediately but Grayling's department – which would have had to pay for the service – was reluctant to accept.

=== Seaborne Freight: 2018–2019 ===
On 29 December 2018, it emerged that Grayling's department had awarded £46.6m to French firm Brittany Ferries, £42.5m to Danish shipping firm DFDS, and £13.8m to British firm Seaborne Freight, to provide additional cross-channel freight capacity in case of a "no-deal" Brexit on 29 March 2019. On 2 January 2019, it was reported that Seaborne Freight had never run a ferry service and owned no ships. The Road Haulage Association said the firm had an impossible timescale in which to "source ferries, hire and train staff and link with relevant authorities". Despite Grayling's assurance that the usual procurement due diligence procedures had been followed, it was later revealed that Seaborne Freight issued terms and conditions designed for a food delivery business, not ferries; that its chief executive previously ran a ship chartering business that was forced into liquidation following court petitions from HM Revenue and Customs (HMRC); and that auditors performing the due diligence checks had reported serious concerns about the contract. In relation to the prior court action by HMRC against Seaborne Freight's chief executive, the amount of unpaid tax was not reported, but the former company had a total of £1.78 million in unpaid debts.

Grayling's unilateral decision to use Ostend, instead of Calais, as the continental terminal for some ferry services, was not appreciated in Calais, whose port chairman told Grayling he was no longer welcome there.

Seaborne Freight's contract was cancelled on 8 February 2019 by Grayling's department after the Irish firm, Arklow Shipping, which was secretly intended to run the contract decided to pull out. The collapse of the contract led to calls from both sides of parliament for Grayling's dismissal. On 13 February 2019, Grayling's department said that, following the collapse of the Seaborne Freight contract, it had "run out of time" to secure the substantial additional cross-channel transport capacity that could be needed in the event of a no-deal Brexit.

Eurotunnel, operator of the Channel Tunnel, initiated legal action against the Department for Transport, claiming that the awarding of ferry contracts for the event of a no-deal Brexit had been "secretive and flawed", and that Eurotunnel, which also operates freight services across the English Channel, had not had the opportunity to compete. The matter was settled out of court, with Eurotunnel receiving £33 million as part of a deal in which the company will provide freight services in the event of a no-deal Brexit. This caused renewed calls for Grayling's dismissal.

On 16 March 2019, it emerged that the ferry companies engaged by Grayling would receive an additional £28m in the event of Brexit being delayed beyond 29 March 2019, which it was.

=== Delays and cost overruns to introduction of Class 800 trains ===
In March 2019, Lord Adonis, former Labour transport minister, was critical of the delay in implementing services on the East Coast Mainline, using Class 800 trains. The trains were ordered ten years before services commenced. Delays were caused when it was found the trains interfered with trackside signalling equipment. Adonis said, "They had 10 years to get these signalling issues right." Similar trains, introduced by Great Western Railway had cost twice the estimated amount. Grayling said, "These new state-of-the-art trains show our commitment to put passengers at the heart of everything that we do and will carry people across Britain, from Swansea to Aberdeen and London to Inverness." The service, planned to run to Swansea, has only so far reached Cardiff. Grayling travelled on the first Class 800 train, operated by Great Western Railway. It set off 25 minutes late, arrived 41 minutes late, and had no air-conditioning when it arrived. The air conditioning was switched off after it leaked liquid into the carriages. Grayling declined to travel on the first Class 800 to run on the East Coast Main Line.

== Post-ministerial career ==
Boris Johnson reportedly hoped for Grayling to be voted in as Chair of the Intelligence and Security Committee by the narrow Conservative majority sitting on the committee. The possible appointment prompted criticism from fellow Conservative MPs, acting Liberal Democrat leader Ed Davey and Shadow Defence Secretary Nia Griffith, who said his appointment would "make a mockery" of the committee. There were fears it would be a "power grab" by Johnson and his senior adviser Dominic Cummings designed to avoid accountability over their links to Russia outlined in a suppressed report. On 15 July 2020, opposition committee members voted for independently minded Conservative Julian Lewis as chair which, together with his vote, secured a majority for him.

In May 2020, Grayling alongside Mark Cecil were appointed trustees of the National Portrait Gallery by Johnson. Both were reappointed as trustees by prime minister Rishi Sunak in December 2023 for another four year term.

After Grayling's failure to be elected as Intelligence and Security Committee chair, he was criticised by colleagues who referred back to his previous track record as a minister, and who The Spectator reported as saying "only Grayling could lose a rigged election". Julian Lewis had the party whip withdrawn by Boris Johnson. On 21 July 2020, the committee released the previously repressed report which outlined how the government had failed to investigate Russian interference in the 2016 EU referendum. On 28 August, it was reported Grayling had resigned from the committee. The Guardian commented that sources familiar with the matter had indicated he had "gone off in a sulk" and had no desire to serve on the committee as an ordinary member.

On 17 September 2020, it was announced that Grayling had been appointed to a £100,000-per-annum 7-hour-per-week job advising the British Virgin Islands-domiciled Hutchison Port Holdings Limited "on its environmental strategy and its engagement with local enterprise bodies".

In October 2023, Grayling announced he had been diagnosed with prostate cancer and would therefore not seek re-election at the 2024 general election. He said: "Earlier this year I was diagnosed with prostate cancer, and although the treatment has been successful, it has prompted me to think that after 22 years it is time for a change". In March 2024, he appealed to South Western Railway to increase train services in his constituency during morning rush hours due to most trains being full. In May 2024, the Conservative Environment Network awarded Grayling the annual Sam Barker Memorial Prize for his efforts to reduce deforestation and maintain British wildlife habitats.

=== Peerage ===
After standing down as an MP, Grayling was nominated for a life peerage in the 2024 Dissolution Honours. He was created Baron Grayling, of Ashtead in the County of Surrey, on 20 August 2024.

== Personal life ==
Grayling is married to Susan Dillistone and they have two children. As of 2016, he lives in Ashtead.

== Publications ==
- The Bridgewater Heritage: The Story of Bridgewater Estates by Christopher Grayling, 1983, Bridgewater Estates PLC
- A Land Fit for Heroes: Life in England After the Great War by Christopher Grayling, 1985, Buchan & Enright ISBN 0-907675-68-9
- Holt's: The Story of Joseph Holt by Christopher Grayling, 1985, Joseph Holt PLC
- Just Another Star?: Anglo-American Relations Since 1945 by Christopher Grayling and Christopher Langdon, 1987, Virgin Books ISBN 0-245-54603-0
- Insight Guide Waterways of Europe contribution by Chris Grayling, 1989, Apa Publications ISBN 0-88729-825-7

Parliament of the United Kingdom
Preceded by Archie Hamilton	Member of Parliament for Epsom and Ewell; 2001–2024	Succeeded by Helen Maguire
Political offices
Preceded by Tim Yeo	Shadow Secretary of State for Transport; 2005–2007	Succeeded by Theresa Villiers
Preceded by Philip Hammond	Shadow Secretary of State for Work and Pensions; 2007–2009	Succeeded by Theresa May
Preceded by Dominic Grieve	Shadow Home Secretary; 2009–2010	Succeeded by Alan Johnson
Preceded by Jim Knight as Minister of State for Employment and Welfare Reform	Minister of State for Employment; 2010–2012	Succeeded by Mark Hoban
Preceded by Ken Clarke	Secretary of State for Justice; 2012–2015	Succeeded by Michael Gove
Preceded by Ken Clarke	Lord High Chancellor of Great Britain; 2012–2015	Succeeded by Michael Gove
Preceded by William Hague	Leader of the House of Commons; 2015–2016	Succeeded by David Lidington
Preceded by Nick Clegg	Lord President of the Council; 2015–2016	Succeeded by David Lidington
Preceded by Patrick McLoughlin	Secretary of State for Transport; 2016–2019	Succeeded by Grant Shapps
Orders of precedence in the United Kingdom
Preceded by The Lord Sharma	Gentlemen; Baron Grayling	Followed by The Lord Booth-Smith
