= HM Prison and Probation Service =

Executive agency of the Ministry of Justice

His Majesty's Prison and Probation Service

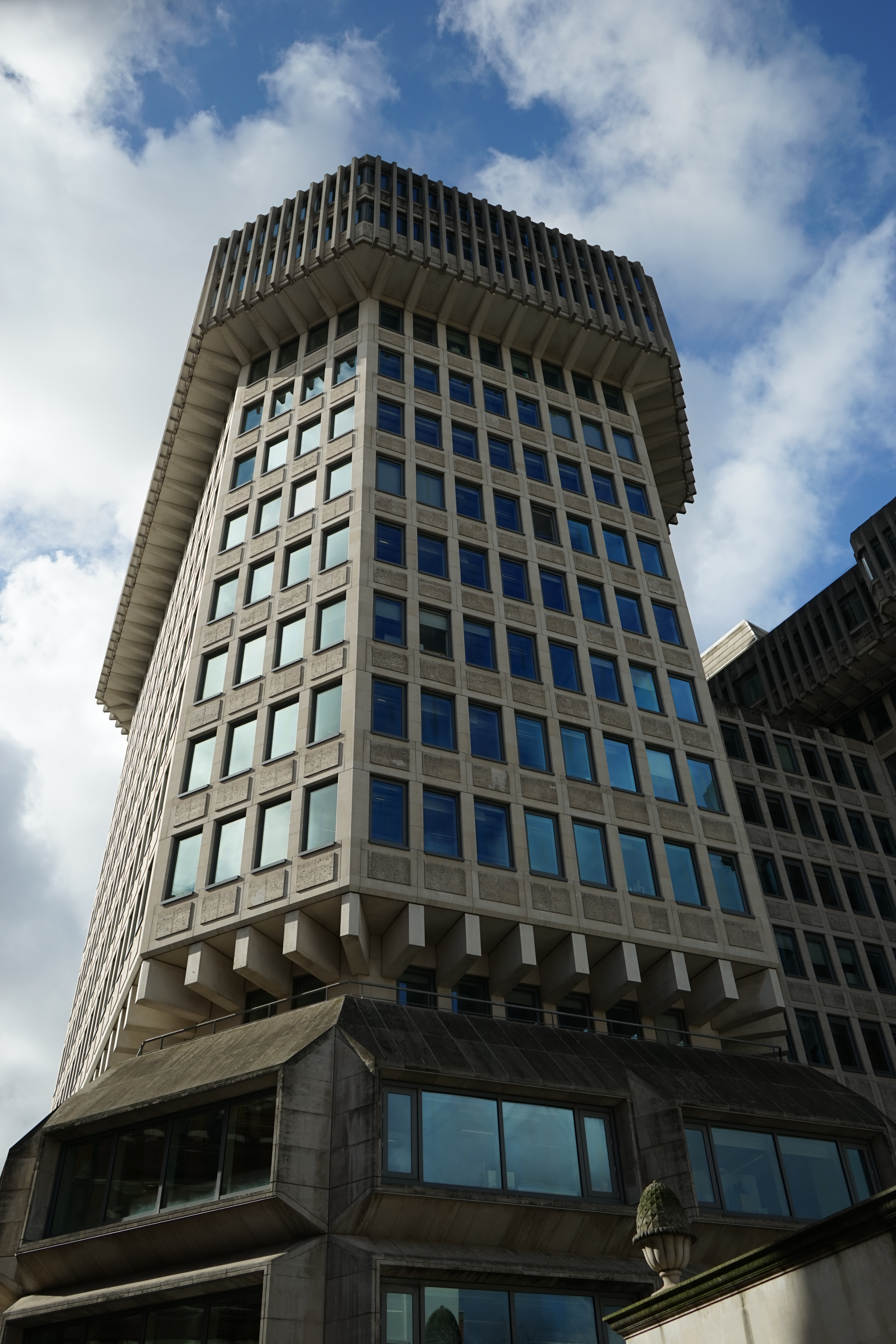
- Headquarters at 102 Petty France, London

Executive Agency overview
- Formed: 2004 (as NOMS)
- Jurisdiction: England and Wales, United Kingdom
- Headquarters: 102 Petty France, London
- Employees: 64,561 (June 2025)
- Minister responsible: Catherine McKinnell, Minister of State for Prisons, Parole and Probation
- Executive Agency executives: James McEwen, Chief Executive; Michelle Jarman-Howe, Interim Director General, Prison Operations; Jim Barton, Interim Director General, Probation Operations
- Parent department: Ministry of Justice
- Child agencies: His Majesty's Prison Service; Probation Service
- Website: gov.uk/hmpps

His Majesty's Prison and Probation Service is an executive agency of the Ministry of Justice (MOJ) responsible for the correctional services in England and Wales. It was created in 2004 as the National Offender Management Service (NOMS) by combining parts of both of the headquarters of the National Probation Service and His Majesty's Prison Service with some existing Home Office functions. In 2017, some of the agency's functions transferred to the Ministry of Justice and it received a new name.

== History ==
=== Creation as NOMS ===
NOMS was created on 1 June 2004 following a review by Patrick Carter (now Lord Carter of Coles), a Labour-supporting businessman. Carter had been asked by the government to propose a way of achieving a better balance between the prison population in England and Wales and the resources available for the correctional services. He proposed three radical changes. Firstly, that there should be 'end-to-end management' of each offender from first contact with the correctional services to full completion of the sentence. Secondly, that there should be a clear division between the commissioners of services and their providers. And thirdly that there should be 'contestability' amongst these providers. By this means, he argued, efficiency would be increased, unit costs reduced, and innovation encouraged. Growth in the prison population, which had increased by two thirds over the previous ten years, would be constrained by giving the courts greater confidence in the effectiveness of community sentences as opposed to prison sentences through better management of offenders, leading to reduced levels of recidivism. The Government accepted these proposals.

=== Changes following the creation of the MOJ ===
On 9 May 2007 the correctional services element of the Home Office was moved to join the former Department of Constitutional Affairs in the newly created Ministry of Justice. In January 2008, the then Secretary of State for Justice, Jack Straw, announced major organisational reform which resulted in the Director-General of His Majesty's Prison Service, Phil Wheatley, becoming the Chief Executive of NOMS, and assuming responsibility for both the National Probation Service (NPS) as well as HM Prison Service and management of contracts for private sector operation of prisons and prisoner escorting. Following this the Chief Executive post was reclassified as Director-General. and NOMS was designated as an executive agency within the Ministry of Justice

=== Introduction of HMPPS ===
In February 2017, the then-Secretary of State for Justice, Liz Truss, confirmed that NOMS would be replaced by HMPPS in April that year. Responsibility for commissioning services, development of policy and setting standards passed from the agency to the MoJ.

== List of chief executives ==
- Martin Narey (2004 to 2005)
- Helen Edwards (2005 to 2008)
- Phil Wheatley as Director-General (2008 to 2010)
- Michael Spurr (2010 to 2019)
- Jo Farrar (2019 to 2022)
- Amy Rees (2022 to 2025)
- Phil Copple as interim (2025)
- James McEwen (2025 to present)
