= Probation Service (England and Wales) =

Criminal justice service in England and Wales

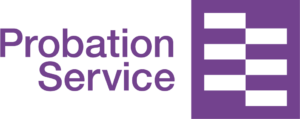
current logo of the Probation Service

National Probation Service logo pre June 2021

The Probation Service (formerly the National Probation Service) for England and Wales is a statutory criminal justice service, mainly responsible for the supervision of offenders in the community and the provision of reports to the criminal courts to assist them in their sentencing duties. It was established in its current form by the Criminal Justice and Court Services Act in April 2001, but has existed since 1907 as a set of area-based services interacting at arm's length with central government.

The current Probation Service was created on 26 June 2021 following the Ministry of Justice withdrawing the contracts of 21 privately-run Community Rehabilitation Companies (CRCs).

The service is part of His Majesty's Prison and Probation Service (HMPPS) which transferred to the Ministry of Justice from the Home Office on 9 May 2007. It comprises 42 probation areas which are coterminous with police force area boundaries, served by 35 probation trusts. Trusts are funded by HMPPS and employ all staff except the chief officer; they are accountable to their boards (comprising up to fifteen members appointed by the Secretary of State) for day-to-day operations and financial management, and to HMPPS via a Regional Offender Manager with whom they have service level agreements, for performance against the targets for the offender management and interventions services for which they have been funded.

The work of probation trusts is scrutinised by HMPPS which reports independently to UK government ministers and by HM Inspectorate of Probation. There are concerns that staff shortages, failure in communication and privatisation may be weakening the probation service and putting the public at risk.

Northern Ireland has its own probation service, whilst in Scotland criminal justice social work services are managed within the social work departments of local authorities.

== History ==
The Church of England Temperance Society and other voluntary societies appointed missionaries to the London police courts during the late nineteenth century. From this developed the system of releasing offenders on the condition that they kept in touch with the missionary and accepted guidance. In 1907 this supervision was given a statutory basis which allowed courts to appoint and employ probation officers.

The service, at the start of 2004, had some 18,000 staff. Statistics for the year 2002 state that it supervised just less than 193,000 offenders and provided 253,000 pre-sentence reports to courts in England and Wales, advising them on the background of and proposing appropriate sentences for convicted offenders. In addition, it has responsibility for ensuring that victims of violent and sexual crime resulting in prison sentences of over 12 months are consulted before offenders are released from custody.

The advent of NOMS in 2004 changed the pattern of correctional services delivery in England and Wales. The Offender Management Bill, introduced in Parliament late in 2006, was intended to enable probation areas to become trusts as part of wider government policy to open up the provision of correctional services to greater competition from the voluntary, community, and private sectors. This was one of the recommendations of the Carter Report (2003): others were to introduce a system of end-to-end offender management, with one named offender manager having responsibility for an offender throughout his or her sentence (be it in custody, the community, or both), and to rebalance sentencing in order to redress the drift towards less and less serious offences resulting in imprisonment or community sentences. Carter saw the need to improve public and sentencer confidence not only in community sentences but also in the fine as credible sanctions for appropriate offenders and offences.

The Bill completed its passage through Parliament in July 2007, and the first six probation trusts came into being on 1 April 2008 (Merseyside, South Wales, Humberside, Dyfed/Powys, West Mercia and Leicestershire & Rutland). Lancashire Probation Trust achieved Trust status on 1 April 2009.

In 2014 the Offender Rehabiliation Act 2014 resulted in the creation of 21 Community Rehabiliation Companies (CRC) and the National Probation Service (NPS). The CRCs were responsible for supervising people assessed low or medium risk of harm and for delivering Unpaid Work. The NPS took on responsibility for supervising high risk people and probation work in the courts such as report writing and prosecuting breaches.

In 2021 the CRCs and the NPS were disbanded and a new national service called The Probation Service was formed on 21 June. The Probation Service comprises 11 regions overseen by a Regional Probation Director.

== Criticism ==
An article in The Guardian suggests privatisation of the probation service was done in haste, underfunded and is failing. Probation is being used less because judges and magistrates have lost confidence in the privatised probation system.

The probation service in London is understaffed and many probation officers are inexperienced. Probationers are seen too infrequently and some are overlooked. A proper risk assessment is not done in the majority of cases. Privatisation of probation service continues to produce "troubling" results. The Chief Inspector of Probation disclosed that probation supervision for one in four low-risk offenders in Gwent is no more than a phone call every six weeks. HM Inspectorate of Probation maintains half of cases have no proper assessment of risk of harm. Junior officers working for Community Rehabilitation Companies (CRCs) sometimes manage over 200 cases each though at most 60 can be managed safely.

Not enough is done to supervise former prisoners after release from jail and discourage reoffending. Glenys Stacey, Chief Inspector of Probation said, "Although there are exceptions, the community rehabilitation companies... are not generally producing good quality work, not at all."

The Justice Select Committee said the 'Transforming Rehabilitation' programme had brought the probation system into a "mess", staff morale was at an "all-time low" and newly released prisoners got "wholly inadequate" support. The committee said that splitting the service between a national body and 21 rehabilitation companies lead to a two-tier system, reducing voluntary sector involvement. MPs said the companies' efforts to reduce re-offending is "disappointing" and some staff are not trained to deal with cases they are assigned. Perpetrators of domestic abuse are inadequately supervised by private companies, putting tens of thousands of victims and their families at risk. The staff of privatised offender supervision companies do not have the skill, experience or time to supervise perpetrators. HM Inspectorate of Probation found in 71% of cases, there was insufficient victim protection. Glenys Stacey stated private Community Rehabilitation Companies were "nowhere near effective enough." Katie Ghose of Women's Aid said, "This report shows that community rehabilitation companies are failing victims, with a significant lack of understanding about domestic abuse, especially coercive control. Probation officers are routinely underestimating the ongoing danger posed to the victim and not reassessing the level of risk involved when circumstances change. The findings of this report show that CRCs are currently not fit for purpose when it comes to domestic abuse cases and we call on the government to urgently change this to protect survivors". Too few perpetrators of domestic abuse are referred to courses to help them manage relationships better and those who do too frequently do not complete the course.

Serious offences committed by people supervised by the probation service have increased markedly. Richard Burgon said, "All too often probation appears stretched to breaking point and struggling to fulfil its fundamental role of keeping the public safe. The Conservatives' irresponsible decision to break up and privatise much of probation has put huge pressures on the system. The government urgently needs to explain how it plans to tackle this extremely worrying rise in serious offences committed by offenders".

Suicides by people the Probation Service manages have risen by 19% from 283 in 2017–18 to 337 in 2018–19, and amounted to 31% of all deaths of offenders in the community. Deborah Coles of INQUEST said, "These figures are deeply disturbing and require urgent scrutiny due to the current lack of independent investigation. What is known is that people are being released into failing support systems, poverty and an absence of services for mental health and addictions. This is state abandonment. This is the violence of austerity."

== See also ==
- Violent and Sex Offender Register
- Offender Assessment System (OASys)
- Probation services are provided by local authorities in Scotland
- Drug Interventions Programme
- Lancashire Probation Trust
