= List of Desert Island Discs episodes (2021–present) =

The BBC Radio 4 programme Desert Island Discs invites guests to choose eight pieces of music which they would take with them to a hypothetical desert island. They are also invited to select a book of their choosing (in addition to the Bible or a comparable religious text for the guest, and the complete works of William Shakespeare), and one luxury item (provided it is inanimate and would not help them escape the island). The following is a list of episodes that have been broadcast since 2021, detailing the guest on each episode, their chosen book, and their luxury item.

== 2021 ==
Date	Castaway	Book	Luxury
10 January 2021	David Olusoga	The Collected Essays, Journalism and Letters of George Orwell: An Age Like This, 1920–40	Acoustic guitar
17 January 2021	Samantha Power	The Irish Times Book of Favourite Irish Poems by Colm Tóibín	A guitar
24 January 2021	Tim Peake	An atlas	A telescope
31 January 2021	Monica Galetti	The Complete Works of Oscar Wilde	Scuba diving gear
7 February 2021	George McGavin	A History of the World in 100 Objects by Neil MacGregor	Hot sauce
14 February 2021	Malala Yousafzai	Complete Works of Plato	Lip balm
21 February 2021	Sophia Loren	Letters from a Young Father by Edoardo Ponti	A pizza oven
28 February 2021	Claire Horton	A book by Dick Francis	A piano and sheet music
7 March 2021	Mark Strong	Magnum Streetwise: The Ultimate Collection of Street Photography	A wind up radio
14 March 2021	Dame Louise Casey	The collected works of Jane Austen	A supply of wine
21 March 2021	Maggie O'Farrell	Selected Stories by Alice Munro	National Museum of Ireland - Archaeology
28 March 2021	Professor Sir Simon Wessely	A Teach Yourself Russian book	A Viennese café
9 May 2021	Billie Piper	The Cost of Living by Deborah Levy	Her children's art work
16 May 2021	Brian Greene	Philosophical Explanations by Robert Nozick	A solar powered particle collider
23 May 2021	Alexei Sayle	The Sword of Honour Trilogy by Evelyn Waugh	A Chinese Broadsword
30 May 2021	Amanda Khozi Mukwashi	Who Moved My Cheese? by Spencer Johnson	Quality Street chocolates
6 June 2021	Heather Hallett	Inspector Morse Mystery Series Collection by Colin Dexter	A solar-powered iPad
13 June 2021	Yo-Yo Ma	Encyclopaedia Britannica	A Swiss Army knife
20 June 2021	Richard Wilson	The poetry of Robert Burns	A subscription to The Guardian newspaper
27 June 2021	Margaret Busby	Return to My Native Land by Aimé Césaire	An endless supply of Ghanaian chocolate
4 July 2021	Paul Costelloe	Reynard the Fox by Anne Louise Avery	A painting kit
11 July 2021	Professor Noel Fitzpatrick	Oscar Wilde: Essays and Letters, Plays and Poems, Stories	A guitar
18 July 2021	Dame Jessica Ennis-Hill	The Wonders of Life by Professor Brian Cox	A photo album
25 July 2021	Robert Macfarlane	Collected works of Gerard Manley Hopkins	A chilli plant
1 August 2021	Nazir Afzal	To Kill a Mockingbird by Harper Lee	A guitar
12 September 2021	Michael Holding	Long Walk to Freedom by Nelson Mandela	A football
19 September 2021	Baroness Hale of Richmond	A Desert Island survival manual	A solar-powered computer with sudoku puzzles and a writing application
26 September 2021	Tracey Ullman	The Secret Diary of Adrian Mole, Aged 13¾ by Sue Townsend	Nuts
3 October 2021	Tom Ilube	The Wormwood Trilogy by Tade Thompson	A solar-powered puzzle generator, designed by Tom
10 October 2021	Dame Sarah Connolly	The Infernal Desire Machines of Doctor Hoffman by Angela Carter	A grand piano with a tuning kit
17 October 2021	Deborah Meaden	A History of the World in 100 Objects by Neil MacGregor	A sketch book and pencil
24 October 2021	Michael Sandel	The Collected Dialogues of Plato	Binoculars
31 October 2021	Peter Schmeichel	The Cuckoo's Calling by Robert Galbraith (J.K. Rowling)	His guitar
7 November 2021	Joanne Harris	The Collected Works of Victor Hugo	Her own shed
19 November 2021	Dame Jo da Silva	The Boardman Tasker Omnibus by Peter Boardman and Joe Tasker	A charpoi (traditional Indian rope bed)
21 November 2021	Carl Hester	The Centenary Book of Sark: a history and description of the artist William A Toplis by Chris Andrews, Fiona Kelly and Amy McKee	His own pillow
28 November 2021	Neil Gaiman	The Book of the New Sun by Gene Wolfe	A Victorian accounts ledger, a fountain pen and an unlimited supply of ink
5 December 2021	Helen Macdonald	The Karla Trilogy by John le Carré	Luxury bedding
12 December 2021	Jack Thorne	Miller Plays: 1 by Arthur Miller	TV with Channel 4 archive only
19 December 2021	Dame Prue Leith	Ulysses by James Joyce	Writing materials
26 December 2021	Richard Osman	Hercule Poirot: the Complete Short Stories by Agatha Christie	A pad of paper, a pen and dice

== 2022 ==
Date	Castaway	Book	Luxury
9 January 2022	Simon Reeve	Moonshine for Beginners and Experts by Damian Brown	Bird seed
16 January 2022	Deborah Levy	The Archetypes and the Collective Unconscious (Collected Works of C. G. Jung)	A silk sheet
23 January 2022	John Caudwell	A Desert Island survival manual	Sunblock
30 January 2022	Lyse Doucet	A Persian language book	Essential oils
6 February 2022	Professor David Spiegelhalter	Ultimate Survival Handbook by Bear Grylls	An unlimited supply of printed Killer Sudoku
13 February 2022	Leslie Caron	The Sixth Sense of Animals by Maurice Burton	A cutlass
20 February 2022	Anne Tyler	The Golden Apples by Eudora Welty	A supply of pet food
27 February 2022	Professor Nick Webborn	The Complete Works of Charles Dickens	His adapted Segway, with a built-in espresso machine
6 March 2022	Oti Mabuse	Will by Will Smith	A photo of her and her Grandma
13 March 2022	Robert Plant	The Earliest English Poems, translated by Michael Alexander	A basket containing photos of homing pigeons
20 March 2022	Alan Cumming	Desert Gardening for Beginners: How to grow vegetables, flowers, and herbs in an Arid Climate by Cathy Cromell, Linda A. Guy, Lucy K. Bradley	Marijuana seeds
27 March 2022	Winnie Byanyima	The Second Sex by Simone De Beauvoir	A basket weaving needle
8 May 2022	Fiona Hill	Alice in Wonderland by Lewis Carroll	Crystallised ginger
15 May 2022	Bradley Walsh	The Count of Monte Cristo by Alexandre Dumas	A set of golf clubs and balls
22 May 2022	Ellie Simmonds	The Hunger Games trilogy by Suzanne Collins	A diary and pen
29 May 2022	David Harewood	The Sandman by Neil Gaiman	A disco dancefloor
5 June 2022	Jon Ronson	A Magnum photography book	Legal medical marijuana
12 June 2022	Frances O'Grady	History by Elsa Morante	A painting set with edible paints
19 June 2022	Rita Tushingham	Brewer's Dictionary of Phrase and Fable	A photograph album
26 June 2022	Bono	Ulysses by James Joyce	A Spanish guitar
3 July 2022	Adele	The Sun and Her Flowers by Rupi Kaur	A self-inflating mattress
10 July 2022	Andrew Ramroop	Infinite Jest by David Foster Wallace	A tenor steel pan drum
17 July 2022	Kate Ewart-Biggs	The Complete Novels of Jane Austen	An asthma inhaler
24 July 2022	Kate Moss	The Little Prince by Antoine de Saint-Exupéry	A cashmere blanket
31 July 2022	Clare Smyth	The Lord of the Rings by J.R.R. Tolkien	A chef's knife
7 August 2022	John Legend	The Dawn of Everything: A New History of Humanity by David Graeber & David Wengrow	A piano
18 September 2022	Sue Barker	All In by Billie Jean King	New Zealand Sauvignon Blanc wine
25 September 2022	Jay Blades	The Autobiography of Malcolm X by Malcolm X	A reclining massage chair
2 October 2022	Dr Waheed Arian	The Boy Who Harnessed the Wind by Bryan Mealer and William Kamkwamba	Pen and paper
9 October 2022	Kevin Sinfield	The Edge: The Guide to Fulfilling Dreams, Maximizing Success and Enjoying a Lifetime of Achievement by Howard E. Ferguson	A self-propelled treadmill
16 October 2022	Maxine Peake	One Moonlit Night by Caradog Prichard	A solar-powered epilator
23 October 2022	Rick Rubin	The Red Book by Carl Jung	Tarot cards
30 October 2022	Professor Angela Gallop	A collection of works by Robert Harris	A church organ and sheet music
6 November 2022	Richard E. Grant	Alice in Wonderland by Lewis Carroll	A piano
18 November 2022	Professor Jean Golding	The Oxford Book of Twentieth-century English Verse	A mobility power chair
20 November 2022	Barry Hearn	The Old Man and the Sea by Ernest Hemingway	A fishing rod and rocking chair
27 November 2022	Baz Luhrmann	War and Peace by Leo Tolstoy	A silk eye mask
4 December 2022	Edward Enninful	Caste: The Origins of Our Discontents by Isabel Wilkerson	A pair of embroidered slippers
11 December 2022	Cate Blanchett	Hope in the Dark by Rebecca Solnit	Time
18 December 2022	Steven Spielberg	The Grapes of Wrath by John Steinbeck	H-8 Bolex camera
25 December 2022	Kirsty Young	The Most of Nora Ephron by Nora Ephron	A cinema and film archive

== 2023 ==
Date	Castaway	Book	Luxury
8 January 2023	Sir Malcolm Walker	Robinson Crusoe by Daniel Defoe	A cast iron cooking pot
15 January 2023	Gabby Logan	Every Ruddy Word by Alan Partridge	A piano
22 January 2023	Michael Pollan	Ulysses by James Joyce	Dark chocolate
29 January 2023	Professor Corinne Le Quéré	World Atlas of the Oceans by Dave Monahan	A mask and snorkel
5 February 2023	Lesley Manville	A Botanical Encyclopedia	A bed with linen, duvet and pillows
12 February 2023	David Sedaris	A German dictionary	Pencils and paper
19 February 2023	Jenny Beavan	The Complete Novels of Jane Austen	A cello
26 February 2023	Sonia Boyce	Charlie and the Chocolate Factory by Roald Dahl	Champagne
5 March 2023	Robert Webb	Cultural Amnesia by Clive James	Top hat and tails
12 March 2023	Amanda Blanc	Little Women by Louisa May Alcott	A photo album
19 March 2023	Liz Carr	The Little Prince by Antoine de Saint-Exupéry	A pair of ruby slippers
26 March 2023	Dara Ó Briain	The Feynman Lectures on Physics by Richard Feynman	Astrophotography equipment
7 May 2023	Professor Peter Hennessy	Poetry in the Making by Ted Hughes	A fountain pen, ink and paper
14 May 2023	Simon Pegg	The Wasp Factory by Iain Banks	A coffee maker
21 May 2023	Professor Sharon Peacock	The Oxford Textbook of Medicine	A projector and photos
28 May 2023	Ronnie O’Sullivan	Running with the Kenyans by Adharanand Finn	A painting set
4 June 2023	Jeremy Bowen	The Complete Novels of George Orwell	A manual typewriter
11 June 2023	Claudia Rankine	As I Lay Dying by William Faulkner	A solar powered television, playing tennis matches
18 June 2023	Adam Kay	York Notes for the Complete Works of Shakespeare	A diary and pen
25 June 2023	Kate Mosse	Four Quartets by T.S. Eliot	A jukebox
2 July 2023	Stanley Tucci	Westward Ha! by S.J. Perelman	Art supplies
9 July 2023	Peter Doig	A scrapbook	A cutlass
16 July 2023	Jill Scott	The Secret Diary of Adrian Mole, Aged 13¾ by Sue Townsend	A notebook and pens
23 July 2023	Simon Woolley	Football in Sun and Shadow by Eduardo Galeano	A razor blade
30 July 2023	Toto Wolff	The Count of Monte Cristo by Alexandre Dumas	Diving fins and a mask
6 August 2023	Shirley Collins	A collection of Brodie detective novels by Kate Atkinson	A solar powered fridge filled with Italian ice cream and two lipsticks
17 September 2023	Adrian Edmondson	Waiting for Godot by Samuel Beckett	A tab of acid
24 September 2023	Lucinda Russell	Equine Sports Medicine and Surgery by Andris J. Kaneps, Kenneth William Hinchcliff, and Raymond J. Geor	A camper van
1 October 2023	Katherine Ryan	The Highway Rat by Julia Donaldson, illustrated by Axel Scheffler	A hat and skincare set
8 October 2023	Greg Jackson	The Apollo Guidance Computer: Architecture and Operation by Frank O'Brien	A pinball machine
15 October 2023	Dame Donna Langley	Love in the Time of Cholera by Gabriel García Márquez	Tarot cards
22 October 2023	Patrick Grant	Green Woodwork: Working with Wood the Natural Way by Mike Abbott	A complete set of woodworking tools
29 October 2023	Professor Dame Lesley Regan	The Works of George Eliot	Marmite on toast
5 November 2023	Lea Salonga	The Complete Far Side by Gary Larson	Typewriter
17 November 2023	Peter White	The 1962 edition of the Wisden Cricketers' Almanack	Pear drops
19 November 2023	Pia Sinha	A Fine Balance by Rohinton Mistry	Chilli sauce
26 November 2023	Dr Nicola Fox	Pale Blue Dot by Carl Sagan	Lego
3 December 2023	Marina Abramović	In Search of the Miraculous by Peter D. Ouspensky	A cashmere blanket
10 December 2023	Shirley Ballas	Unleash the Power Within by Tony Robbins	Cotton knickers
17 December 2023	Greta Gerwig	The Complete Poems: Emily Dickinson	A writing set
24 December 2023	Delia Smith	Sister Wendy’s 100 Best-loved Paintings by Wendy Beckett	The Desert Island Discs archive

== 2024 ==
Date	Castaway	Book	Luxury
7 January 2024	Graham Nash	The Island at the Center of the World by Russell Shorto	A sleeping bag
14 January 2024	Guli Francis-Dehqani	The Book of Kings	Photo albums
21 January 2024	Sheku Kanneh-Mason	The Feynman Lectures on Physics by Richard Feynman	A cello and strings
28 January 2024	Jamie Dornan	Where The Wild Things Are by Maurice Sendak	A golf club and balls
4 February 2024	Val Wilmer	The Collective Works of Langston Hughes	Nail scissors
11 February 2024	Cillian Murphy	Samuel Beckett: The Complete Dramatic Works	An acoustic guitar and strings
18 February 2024	Clive Oppenheimer	The Vivisector by Patrick White	A seismometer
25 February 2024	Sandy Powell	Josef Koudelka: Gypsies	A lemon tree
3 March 2024	Rita Rae, Lady Rae	The Pursuit of Italy: A History of a Land, its Regions and their Peoples by David Gilmour	A solar powered car
10 March 2024	James Graham	A Brief History of Time by Stephen Hawking	A keg of Single Malt Scotch Whisky
17 March 2024	Jenny Sealey	The Complete Works of Armistead Maupin	A photography kit
24 March 2024	Professor Alice Roberts	Middlemarch by George Eliot	A kayak
31 March 2024	Professor Tim Spector	A Tale of Two Cities by Charles Dickens	A fermenting set
12 May 2024	Greg Davies	TBC: Of Mice and Men by John Steinbeck/The Secret Diary of Adrian Mole, Aged 13¾ by Sue Townsend	Sausages
19 May 2024	Dame Sarah Storey	The Chimp Paradox by Professor Steve Peters	A snorkel and mask
26 May 2024	John Boyne	The Waste Land by T. S. Eliot	A cinema screen showing The Devil Wears Prada
2 June 2024	Rebel Wilson	Charlie and the Chocolate Factory by Roald Dahl	A bath tub and bath salts
9 June 2024	Shirine Khoury-Haq	The Quran	A photo frame
16 June 2024	Clive Myrie	The Metropolitan Museum of Art catalogue	Hot pepper sauce
23 June 2024	Anthony Joshua	A Bear Grylls survival book	A punchbag
30 June 2024	Professor Patricia Wiltshire	Children's Encyclopedia Volume Set by Arthur Mee	A cooking pot
7 July 2024	Rob Delaney	The Collected Works of Alice Munro	A piano
14 July 2024	Errollyn Wallen	A collection of Bach sheet music	Wigmore Hall
21 July 2024	David Nicholls	Anna Karenina by Leo Tolstoy	A piano and sheet music
28 July 2024	Sarah Raven	The Flowers of Crete by John Fielding & Nicholas Turland	An ever-cleaning linen sheet bed with a hot (and cold) water bottle
4 August 2024	Mark Knopfler	The Blue Flower by Penelope Fitzgerald	A guitar
11 August 2024	Steven Knight	The Greek Myths by Robert Graves	A solar powered laptop
1 December 2024	Mark Steel	Wisden Cricketers' Almanack	A piano
8 December 2024	Ebony Rainford-Brent	The Alchemist by Paulo Coelho	A drum kit
15 December 2024	Cher	The Saracen Blade by Frank Yerby	A eyelash curler
22 December 2024	Gareth Southgate	The Chimp Paradox by Dr Steve Peters	Coffee
29 December 2024	Marianela Núñez	The Collected Works of Jorge Luis Borges	A cashmere blanket

== 2025 ==
Date	Castaway	Book	Luxury
5 January 2025	Mark-Anthony Turnage	Rebecca by Daphne du Maurier	A grand piano and tuning kit
12 January 2025	Laurie Anderson	Speak, Memory by Vladimir Nabokov	A dog collar
19 January 2025	Harriet Wistrich	Middlemarch by George Eliot	A fridge with an endless supply of white wine
26 January 2025	Nick Cave	The Adventures of Pinocchio by Carlo Collodi	A suit
2 February 2025	Nemone Lethbridge	The Rubaiyat of Omar Khayyam	A doll
9 February 2025	Stephen Mangan	Collected Works of Seamus Heaney	A piano
16 February 2025	Mina Smallman	The Woman in White by Wilkie Collins	Hair moisturiser
23 February 2025	Sir Jony Ive	The complete set of Jeeves & Wooster novels by P G Wodehouse	A bed
2 March 2025	William Boyd	Pale Fire by Vladimir Nabokov	A piano
9 March 2025	Cyndi Lauper	Me Talk Pretty One Day by David Sedaris	A luxury hotel
16 March 2025	Professor Carl Jones	The Collected Works of Dylan Thomas	Binoculars
23 March 2025	Donna Ockenden	Jane Eyre by Charlotte Brontë	Red lipstick
30 March 2025	Lindsey Hilsum	Collected Poems by W H Auden	A Tang dynasty horse
11 May 2025	Danny Dyer	Ray Mears Essential Bushcraft: A Handbook of Survival	A Lego Star Wars Millennium Falcon
18 May 2025	Professor Dame Ijeoma Uchegbu	Angela’s Ashes by Frank McCourt	A variety of seeds
25 May 2025	Abdulrazak Gurnah	That Glimpse of Truth: The 100 Finest Short Stories Ever Written selected by David Miller	A nail clipper
1 June 2025	Romesh Ranganathan	Life of Pi by Yann Martel	An unlimited supply of aubergine curry
8 June 2025	Professor Lucy Easthope	The Diddakoi by Rumer Godden	A solar-powered torch
15 June 2025	Lord Alf Dubs	Germinal by Émile Zola	Walking boots
22 June 2025	Norma Percy	In Search of Lost Time by Marcel Proust	A hot shower
29 June 2025	Sir Gregory Doran	A 1609 copy of Shakespeare's Sonnets	A shelf of photo albums
6 July 2025	Carol Klein	Flora Brittanica by Richard Mabey	A bottle of perfume
13 July 2025	Ash Atalla	Rewire Your Anxious Brain: Stop Overthinking, Find Calm, and Be Present by Nick Trenton	An Indian restaurant
20 July 2025	Gustavo Dudamel	One Hundred Years of Solitude by Gabriel Garcia Marquez	Rum
27 July 2025	Monica Dolan	Encyclopedia of Flora and Fauna	A walk-in wardrobe
3 August 2025	Harry Hill	Don Quixote by Miguel de Cervantes	A bucket and spade
10 August 2025	Professor Dame Carol Robinson	The Herbal Apothecary: 100 Medicinal Herbs and How to Use Them by JJ Pursell	A portable mass spectrometer
17 August 2025	Maggie Alphonsi	The Soul of a Butterfly: Reflections on life's journey by Hana Yasmeen Ali and Muhammad Ali	A family photo
28 September 2025	Michael Sheen	The Hero with a Thousand Faces by Joseph Campbell	A football
5 October 2025	Angela Harding	Complete Poetical Works and Letters of Edward Thomas	A lino printing set with champagne
12 October 2025	Ronnie Wood	Just for Today: Daily Meditations for Recovering Addicts by Narcotics Anonymous	A chest containing art materials and a carpet
19 October 2025	Mary Greenwell	The Temple of the Golden Pavilion by Yukio Mishima	A bed
26 October 2025	Lennie James	The Collected Novels of Toni Morrison	A guitar
2 November 2025	Lorraine Kelly	South: The Last Antarctic Expedition of Shackleton and the Endurance by Sir Ernest Shackleton	A solar-powered digital photo album
14 November 2025	Sally Mann	In Search of Lost Time by Marcel Proust	Paper and a pencil
16 November 2025	Sir Tim Berners-Lee	A Pattern Language by Christopher Alexander, Sara Ishikawa and Murray Silverstein	Chromatic harmonica
23 November 2025	Sir Salman Rushdie	Homer’s Odyssey (Translated by Emily Wilson)	A bed with a mosquito net
30 November 2025	Gordon Buchanan	Teach Yourself Tap Dancing by Derek Hartley	A mask, snorkel and fins
7 December 2025	Margaret Atwood	How to Survive on a Desert Island by Samantha Bell	A knife and matchbox
14 December 2025	Lee Child	Killing Floor by Lee Child	A mechanical wind-up watch
21 December 2025	Kate Winslet	Outside: Recipes for a Wilder Way of Eating by Gill Meller	Freshly ground coffee
28 December 2025	Jojo Moyes	The complete works of Fyodor Dostoevsky	A mechanical horse

== 2026 ==
Date	Castaway	Book	Luxury
11 January 2026	Jesse Armstrong	The Norton Anthology of Poetry	A football
18 January 2026	Adeel Akhtar	A Swim in the Pond in the Rain by George Saunders	A solar-powered air fryer
25 January 2026	Kemi Badenoch, MP	Vanity Fair by William Makepeace Thackeray	The Marvel Movie Collection with a solar-powered DVD player
1 February 2026	Professor Michele Dougherty	The Lord of The Rings by J. R. R. Tolkien	An assortment of wine
8 February 2026	Tahra Zafar	The Hitchhiker’s Guide to the Galaxy Complete Books by Douglas Adams	A set of art materials and a storage box
15 February 2026	Richard Young	Siddhartha by Hermann Hesse	Caviar
22 February 2026	Roula Khalaf	A Peace to End All Peace: The Fall of the Ottoman Empire and the Creation of the Modern Middle East by David Fromkin	A notebook and pen
1 March 2026	Dwayne Fields	The Untold Railway Stories: Celebrating 200 Years of Passenger Railways edited by Monisha Rajesh	A multi-functional pocket knife
8 March 2026	Jessie Buckley	The Complete Poems of Tim Buckley	Jessie’s own bathtub and bath salts
15 March 2026	Professor Stephen Westaby	Exercitatio Anatomica de Motu Cordis et Sanguinis in Animalibus by William Harvey	A family photograph
22 March 2026	Sara Pascoe	1984 by George Orwell	A typewriter
29 March 2026	Si King	Combined works of William Dalrymple	A solar-powered fridge and rum
10 May 2026	David Morrissey	Complete works of Charles Dickens	Photograph album, blank pages and pen
17 May 2026	Gary O'Donoghue	A History of Western Philosophy by Bertrand Russell	A cricket ball
24 May 2026	Emily Watson	Staying Alive - a poetry collection	Tate Modern
31 May 2026	Guy Martin	Stealing Speed by Mat Oxley	The back catalogue of Race Engine Technology magazine
7 June 2026	Peter Layton	The Choice by Edith Eger	A solar-powered digital picture frame
14 June 2026	Anna Maxwell Martin	Jackson Brodie Series by Kate Atkinson	Anna’s lucky conker
21 June 2026	Jo Nesbø	Ham on Rye by Charles Bukowski	A shoehorn
28 June 2026	Norman Cook	The Ragged Trousered Philanthropists by Robert Tressell	A label maker
5 July 2026	Professor Liz Morris	The Collected Works of Samuel Johnson	Leather boots
12 July 2026	Paul Farmer	A collection of Simon Armitage’s poetry	A bowling machine with a combination of cricket and tennis balls
19 July 2026	Shania Twain	Life is Fair by Brian Hines	Insect repellent
26 July 2026	Sir Roger Deakins	Moby Dick by Herman Melville	Fishing tackle
2 August 2026	Emma Grede	The Prophet by Kahlil Gibran	A mattress and clean sheets
9 August 2026	Professor Dame Pamela Shaw	Kristin Hannah Collection	Roses
16 August 2026	Chaka Khan	The Prophet by Kahlil Gibran	A gigantic sandalwood and oud candle
27 September 2026	Matt Haig	The Diaries of Samuel Pepys	An unlimited A4 refill pad and pens
4 October 2026	Professor Dame Parveen Kumar	The Complete Jane Austen	Dark chocolate and Claret
11 October 2026	Ann Patchett	Middlemarch by George Eliot	Notebooks and pens
18 October 2026	Dr Miriam Stoppard	The Complete Novels by Flann O’Brien	A feather pillow
25 October 2026	Harlan Coben	Norton Anthology of Modern and Contemporary Poetry, Volume Two	A basketball and a hoop
1 November 2026	Paul Sinton-Hewitt	Unashamed by Harry Baker	A camper van
13 November 2026	Michel Roux	Alex Ferguson: My Autobiography	A bottle of vintage champagne
15 November 2026	Professor Hannah Fry	Fermat's Last Theorem by Simon Lehna Singh	Factor 50 suncream
