= Preston Manor School =

Preston Manor

Location
- Carlton Avenue East; Preston, Wembley, Middlesex, Greater London, HA9 8NA; England; 51.5658°N 0.2891°W

Information
- Type: Academy
- Motto: munus prae jure
- Established: 1938
- Specialist: Science
- Department for Education URN: 139319 Tables
- Ofsted: Reports
- Gender: Mixed
- Age: 4 to 19
- Enrolment: 1590
- Former names: Preston Manor County Grammar School, Preston Manor High School & Sixth Form
- High Performance Leading Options: Leading Edge

Preston Manor is a mixed all-through school within the London Borough of Brent, located in the Preston and Wembley Park areas. It educates primary and secondary school-age children and adults and has a sixth form.

== History ==
=== Grammar school ===
It was founded in 1938 as Preston Manor County Grammar School and its first headteacher was Mr W.P. Bannister. He remained headmaster until his death in 1963. It provided a traditional grammar school curriculum with science and languages streams. The school motto was "Munus prae jure" which may be translated as "Duty before right".

=== Comprehensive ===
It became a Technology College in 1993.

=== Preston Manor as a Science College ===
Preston Manor was amongst the first cohort of schools nationally to become a specialist Science College in 2002 with Mathematics as an additional specialism.

It has four local primary partner schools in the borough that it works with throughout the year as part of its specialist science community work.

=== Academy ===
The school converted to academy status in February 2013.

=== Leadership Structure ===
The current executive head teacher of Preston Manor school is Russell Denial the head of upper school is Tom Phillips.

== Expansion ==
As of September 2008 Preston Manor began admitting forty more students into its cohort. To facilitate this the school needed to expand. Work began in January 2008 on a £4.5 million project which will see a new teaching block and a 4 court sports hall built, amongst other new facilities.

== Notable former pupils ==
- Brandon Njoku footballer
- Riz Lateef - broadcaster
- Darren Currie – footballer with a number of professional and non-League clubs in England
- Barry Ashby - footballer
- Michelle Griffith – triple jumper
- Junior Lewis – footballer and coach with a number of professional and non-League clubs in England
- Una Padel (1956–2006) – criminal justice reformer, known for her work in penal reform
- Lady Sovereign – musician (expelled)
- Kapil Trivedi – drummer for the British Indie Group Mystery Jets
- Rémi Gaillard – French comedian from Montpellier
- Moeed Majeed – Podcast producer and presenter
- Ahir Shah - Comedian
- Bahram Keshtmand – Afghan athlete and nephew of former Afghan politician Sultan Ali Keshtmand.

=== Preston Manor County Grammar School ===
- Bob Blackman – Conservative MP since 2010 for Harrow East
- Simon Bond, author of 101 Uses for a Dead Cat
- Barbara Bray née Jacobs, scholar of French literature and literary translator, partner of Samuel Beckett
- Mike Ellis (athlete), hammer thrower who competed in the Rome 1960 Summer Olympics, and won gold for England at the 1958 British Empire and Commonwealth Games in Cardiff
- Mark Goodfellow, Ambassador to Gabon from 1986 to 1990
- Prof Raymond Gosling, worked with the DNA team at King's College London in the early 1950s, and took the infamous Photo 51 in May 1952, that enabled Watson and Crick to deduce the structure of DNA was a double helix
- John Hosier CBE – Head of schools music broadcasts at the BBC from 1960 to 1973 and Principal of the Guildhall School of Music and Drama from 1978 to 1989
- Andrew Pryce Jackman, keyboardist in The Syn who arranged the Peter Skellern song "You're a Lady", and whose father Bill Jackman played the clarinet on When I'm Sixty-Four, and his son is the film composer Henry Jackman, notably for Big Hero 6
- Vivian Liff, known for The Record of Singing
- Jim Slater, private investor who started Slater Walker in the 1960s, and the Really Essential Financial Statistics (REFS) company financial information system in 1994, and who wrote The Zulu Principle
- Jeffrey Sterling, Baron Sterling of Plaistow CBE, chairman from 1983 to 2005 of P&O, owns the Swan Hellenic cruise line, and founded Motability in 1977
- Rosemary Thew, Chief Executive from 2005 to 2013 of the Driving Standards Agency, who arranged its merger with VOSA
- Mari Wilson, singer

== Notable teachers ==
- Colin Hegarty, creator of HegartyMaths
