= Una Padel =

British criminal-justice reformer

Una Padel OBE (21 July 1956 – 29 August 2006) was a British criminal-justice reformer, known for her work in penal reform. She was the director of the Centre for Crime and Justice Studies (CCJS) from 1999 until her death in 2006, after which the centre established the Una Padel Award.

== Life and career ==
Born in Hampstead, London, to Sigrid and William H. Padel, Una grew up in Wembley and was educated at Preston Manor High School and at the universities of Durham, York, and Newcastle, where she took a degree in psychology and diplomas in social administration and social work. She joined the Northumbria Probation Service in 1980, became deputy director to Stephen Shaw at the Prison Reform Trust in 1985, and was made assistant director of the Standing Conference on Drug Abuse (now merged with the Institute for the Study of Drug Dependence to form DrugScope) in 1989. She also did work in providing HIV education in prisons. In 1988 she co-authored the book Insiders: women's experience in prisons with Prue Stevenson

In 1993 she started a project called the London Prisons Community Links (LPCL) whose aim was to set up visitor centres at all of London's prisons, and by 1998 she had achieved her goal. After this she founded CLINKS, an organisation whose goal was to encourage voluntary organisations to offer services in prison. In 2000 she was a member of the Laming committee which looked at penal reform. She was appointed OBE in 2003. In the same year she became chair of the Penal Affairs Consortium, a group that coordinates organisations involved in the penal system.

From 1999 until her death from cancer in 2006, Padel was the director of the Centre for Crime and Justice Studies (CCJS), or the Institute for the Study and Treatment of Delinquency as it was then called when she joined. During her career she was involved in numerous advocacy groups and committees.

Padel left behind a daughter, Morag, her parents, and two sisters. An obituary in The Guardian noted her "profound sense of social justice" which "stemmed from an incisive understanding of and empathy with the underdog. She kept a bright, well-organised light burning for decency and justice during a period when an increasingly party political mood of penal populism threatened to sweep away hard fought for principles and structures." Tony Pearson of the centre also paid tribute to her and used an anecdote to illustrate her qualities: "Who will forget her obvious delight only a few months ago when she appeared in court and successfully helped the driver who was ferrying her to and from the office as her health deteriorated in getting permission to start training as a black cab driver, despite his previous minor convictions."

After her death the CCJS established the annual Una Padel Award in her memory to recognise organisations and individuals in penal reform. The first in 2007 was awarded to Prison Chat UK and to Gillian Margaret Butler, the chair of Yarl's Wood Befrienders.

After reforms in 2001 that threatened to restrict jury trials to only serious offences, Padel said "It seems unfair that the best quality justice is reserved for the most serious offences. Relatively minor offences can have a devastating impact on someone's life—by losing them their job, for example." She said that British criminals liked Spain because the two countries did not have an extradition treaty, and that "When a lot of criminals gather there, it becomes a community and the criminal feels like he is among 'his own'."

When her daughter was robbed at the age of 13, she said she did not want the perpetrators to be jailed—which was "true to her principles" according to Charles Murray. She explained: "I want them to stop robbing people, that’s the bottom line ... In an ideal world I would like them to be made aware of the impact they’ve actually had on my daughter and, ideally, apologise." She supported allowing prisoners to vote and was involved in the Barred From Voting campaign by UNLOCK, The National Association of Reformed Offenders.

== Sources ==
- "2005/2006 annual report" (PDF). Archived from the original (PDF) on 4 December 2010. (687 KB). Centre for Crime and Justice Studies. Retrieved 30 October 2010.
- Murray, Charles (June 2005). "2005/2006 Simple Justice" (PDF). (341 KB). Civitas. For the webpage at Civitas see "Why Punishment Is No Crime". Civitas. 27 June 2005. Retrieved 30 October 2010. Archived by WebCite on 30 October 2010.
