= Perrie Award =

The Perrie Award has been presented annually since 1995 by the Perrie Lectures Committee to the person who has done most to promote an understanding of the work of the Prison Service in England and Wales, and pushed forward the development of penal policy. The award and the associated lectures aim to improve the care of offenders and advance penal policy. The organising committee is made up of members from within the penal service (NOMS or National Offender Management Service), and from academia, charities and other fields.

The award and lecture programme were named in honour of Bill Perrie (1918–1997), regarded as one of the leading prison governors of his time.

== Award winners ==
Year	Winner	Notes
1995	Judge Stephen Tumim	
1996	A J (Tony) Pearson	Former Deputy Director, UK Prison Service
1997	Vivien Stern	
1998	John Staples	Former prison governor and trustee of the Howard League for Penal Reform
1999	Sir Peter Lloyd	
2000	Tim Newell	Founder of Escaping Victimhood charity and author of Restorative Justice in Prisons
2001	Sir David Ramsbotham	
2002	The Prison Service Respond/Respect team	A minority ethnic staff support network.
2003	Lord Chief Justice Woolf	
2004	Colin Allen	Deputy chief inspector of prisons 1995-2002
2005	Frances Crook	
2006	Kathy Biggar	Suicide Prevention Advisor, High Security Prisons 2001 -2007. Founder of The Listener Scheme. Deceased June 2018.
2007	Clive Stafford Smith	
2008	Bob Perry	
2009	Farida Anderson	Founder of POPs charity (Partners of Prisoners)
2010	Stephen Shaw	
2011	Trevor Williams	Director of Offender Management for the Eastern Region
2012	Dame Anne Owers	
2013	The Venerable William Noblett	
2014	Juliet Lyon	
2015	Sir Martin Narey	Former director general of the Prison Service for England & Wales
2016	Alison Liebling, Cambridge University	Her research into prisons has contributed immensely to the welfare of prisoners.
2017	Sarah Payne	
