= James Goldsmith =

French-British tycoon and politician (1933–1997)

Sir James Goldsmith
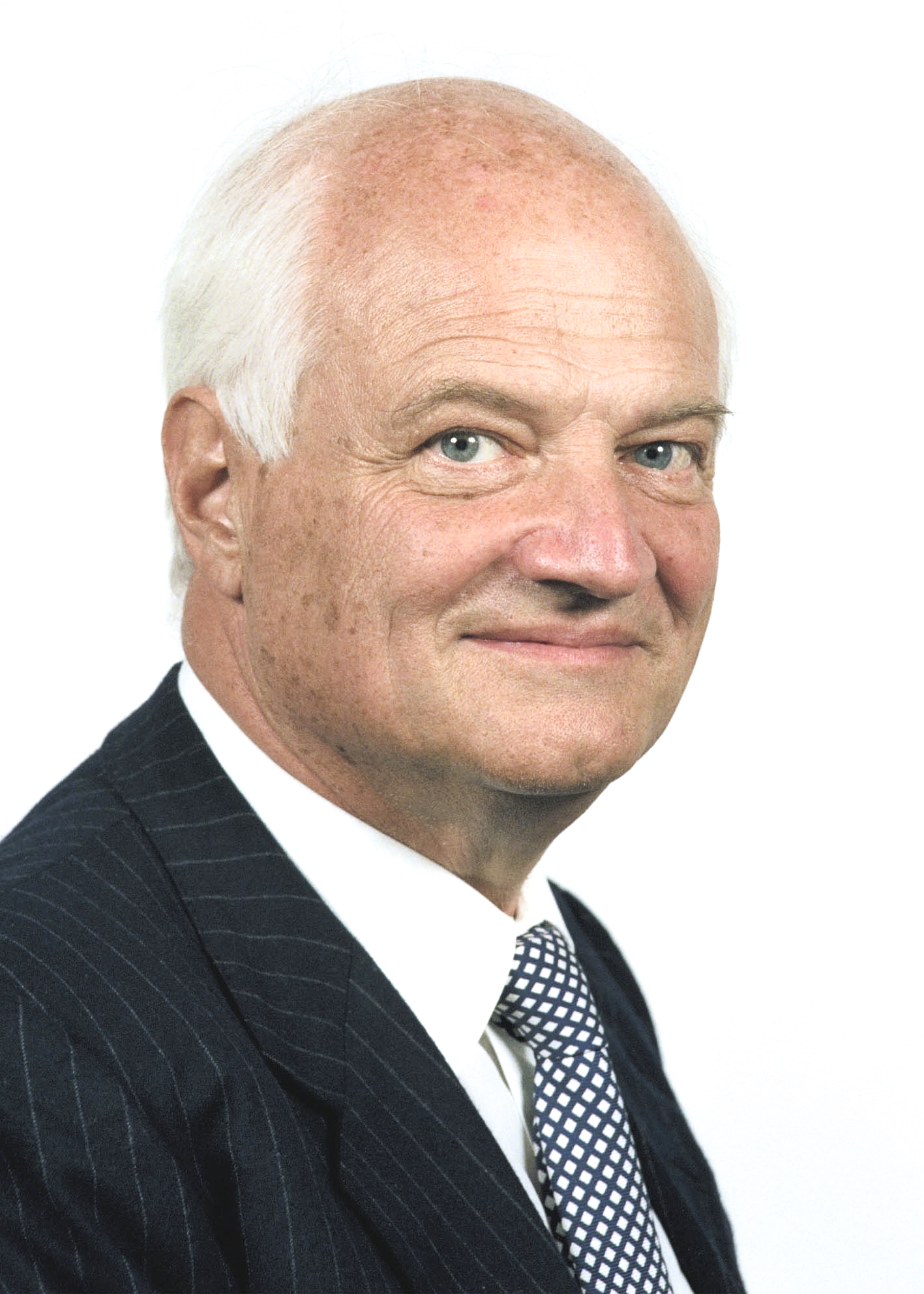
- Official portrait, 1994

Leader of the Referendum Party
- In office 1994–1997
- Preceded by: Office created
- Succeeded by: Office abolished

Member of the European Parliament for France
- In office 1994–1997

Personal details
- Born: James Michael Goldsmith; 26 February 1933 Paris, France
- Died: 18 July 1997 (aged 64) Benahavís, Spain
- Party: Movement for France; Referendum Party
- Spouses: María Isabel Patiño y Borbón (m. 1954; died 1954); Ginette Christiane Léry (m. 1956; div. 1978); Annabel Goldsmith (m. 1978)
- Domestic partner: Laure Boulay de La Meurthe
- Children: 8, including Jemima, Zac, Ben, and Charlotte
- Parents: Frank Goldsmith; Marcelle Mouiller
- Relatives: See Goldsmith family
- Education: Millfield, Eton College
- Known for: Finance, Eurosceptic politician
- Website: sirjamesgoldsmith.com

Sir James Michael Goldsmith (26 February 1933 – 18 July 1997) was a French-British financier and politician who was a member of the Goldsmith family. His controversial business and finance career led to ongoing clashes with British media, frequently involving litigation or the threat of litigation.

In 1994 he was elected to represent a French constituency as a Member of the European Parliament. He founded the short-lived Eurosceptic Referendum Party in the United Kingdom, which became an early campaigner for opposition to Britain's membership of the European Union.

== Early life ==
Born in Paris, Goldsmith was the son of luxury hotel tycoon and former Conservative Member of Parliament (MP) Major Frank Goldsmith and his French wife, Marcelle Mouiller, and younger brother of environmental campaigner Edward Goldsmith. Frank Goldsmith had previously changed the family name from the German Goldschmidt to the English Goldsmith. The Goldschmidts, neighbours and rivals of the Rothschild family, were a wealthy, Frankfurt-based, Jewish family that had been influential in international merchant banking since the 16th century. James's great-grandfather was Benedikt Hayum Goldschmidt, founder of the B. H. Goldschmidt bank and consul to the Grand Duke of Tuscany. James's grandfather was Adolphe Benedict Goldschmidt (1838–1918), a multi-millionaire who moved to London in 1895.

Raised initially in Paris, James Goldsmith had to flee France with his family when Nazi Germany overran the country in 1940, only just managing to escape on the last over-loaded ship from the French port of exit, leaving behind their hotels and much of their property. After that the family relocated to the Bahamas, and Goldsmith was sent to school at St. Andrew's College, Aurora, in Canada, where he founded a business trapping small furbearing animals such as rabbits, skunk and mink. He later attended Millfield and Eton College, which he left early in 1949 at the age of 16, after winning £8,000 (equivalent to £244,000 in 2025) on a horse racing bet of £10 (equivalent to £310 in 2025) for a three-horse accumulator at Lewes racecourse. With the money, he decided that he should leave Eton immediately; in a speech at his boarding house, he declared that "a man of my means should not remain a schoolboy!" He then took over a business in Paris from his brother Teddy, which sold a cure for rheumatism and electrical plugs and sockets.

Goldsmith served as a Gunner in the British Army's Royal Artillery under the National Service requirements, during which time he received a commission as an officer.

== Business career ==
During the 1950s and 60s, Goldsmith's involvement in finance and as an industrialist involved many risks, and brought him close to bankruptcy several times. His successes included winning the British franchise for Alka-Seltzer and introducing low-cost generic drugs to the UK. He was described in the tabloid press as a greenmail corporate raider and asset stripper, a categorisation he denied vigorously. He claimed the re-organizations he undertook streamlined the operations, removed complacent inefficient management, and increased shareholder value.

Having taken on the management of the Paris business handed on by his brother Teddy, Goldsmith organised a publicity stunt involving an arthritic racehorse. Sales escalated in response and, within a couple of years, the staff had been expanded from two to over a hundred. Goldsmith took on the agency for various slimming remedies and branched out into the manufacture of generic prescription drugs. His acquisition of the distributorship for Slimcea and Procea low-calorie breads was the start of the shift of focus towards the food industry. In the early 1960s, in partnership with Selim Zilkha, Goldsmith founded the Mothercare retail chain, but sold out his share to Zilkha who went on to develop it with great success.

With the financial backing of Sir Isaac Wolfson, he acquired diverse food companies quoted on the London Stock Exchange as Cavenham Foods in 1965. Initially, the group had an annual turnover of £27 million and negligible profits. He added bakeries and then confectioners to the group, and then took over a number of wholesalers and retailers, including small chains of tobacco, confectioner and newsagent shops. By rationalising the activities, closing inefficient factories, and improving the management practices, he steadily improved productivity. By 1971, the turnover was £35 million and profits were up to £2 million.

In June 1971, he launched a bid for Bovril, which was a much larger company with a diverse portfolio including several strong brands (including Marmite, Ambrosia, Virol and Jaffajuice), dairies and dairy farms, and cattle ranches in Argentina. It was run by the third generation of the founding family and Goldsmith concluded that they were ineffectual. The bid was strongly contested and Goldsmith was fiercely attacked by the financial press. The directors tried to induce Beechams and Rowntree Mackintosh to make rival offers but, in the end, they both withdrew.

After the successful bid, Goldsmith sold the dairies and farms to Max Joseph's Express Dairies group for £5.3m, and found buyers in South America for the ranches. Sales of other parts of the company recouped almost all of the £13 million that the acquisition had cost him. Some years later, he sold the brand names to Beecham for £36 million. Later, he took over Allied Distributors, who owned a miscellaneous portfolio of grocery stores and small chains, including the Lipton shops. As journalists began to question his techniques of dealing with the funds and assets of publicly quoted companies, Goldsmith began dealing through private companies registered in the UK and abroad. These included the French company Générale Occidentale and Hong Kong and then Cayman-registered General Oriental Investments.

In early 1973, Goldsmith travelled to New York to assess US business opportunities, followed by a tour round Central and South America. He took the view that the UK economy was due for a downturn and began aggressively liquidating many of his assets. In December that year, in the midst of financial chaos, he announced that he had acquired a 51% controlling stake in Grand Union, one of the oldest retailing conglomerates in the US. He set Jim Wood – who had revitalised his British retail operations – to work on rationalising the operations of the chain, but ran into continuous obstruction from both unions and management.

During the 1960s and 1970s, Goldsmith received financing from the banking arm of the conglomerate Slater Walker, of which he succeeded founder Jim Slater as chairman following the company's collapse and rescue by the Bank of England in the secondary banking crisis of 1973–75.

Goldsmith was knighted in the 1976 resignation honours – the so-called "Lavender List" – of Prime Minister Harold Wilson. In early 1980, he formed a partnership with longtime friend and merchant banker Sir Roland Franklin. Franklin managed Goldsmith's business in the Americas. From 1983 until 1988, Goldsmith, via takeovers in America, built a private holding company, Cavenham Forest Industries, which became one of the largest private owners of timberland and one of the top-five timber-holding companies of any type in America. Goldsmith and Franklin identified a quirk in American accounting whereby companies with substantial timberland holdings would often carry them on their balance sheets at a nominal valuation (as the result of years of depreciation).

Goldsmith, a reader of financial statements, realised that in the case of Crown Zellerbach the underlying value of the timberland assets alone, carried at only $12.5 million on the balance sheet, was worth more than the target company's total market capitalisation of around $900 million. With this insight, Goldsmith began raids that left him with a holding company owning huge tracts of timberland acquired at virtually no net cost. The majority of the pulp and paper assets were sold in 1986 to James River Corporation, which in turn became a part of Georgia-Pacific in 2000. (The brown paper container division became Gaylord Container.)

Additionally, in 1986, Goldsmith's companies reportedly made $90 million from an attempted hostile takeover of the Goodyear Tire and Rubber Company, although he regarded this profit as an inadequate consolation for the failure to carry the bid through to a successful conclusion. The management of the company coordinated a virulent campaign against Goldsmith, involving unions, the press, and politicians at state and federal level.

Goldsmith retired to Mexico in 1987, having anticipated the market crash that year and liquidated his assets. However, he continued corporate raiding, including an attempt on British-American Tobacco in 1989 (for which he joined Kerry Packer and Jacob Rothschild). He also swapped his American timber assets for a 49.9% stake in Newmont Mining and remained on the board of Newmont until he liquidated his stake through open-market trades in 1993. He had been precluded by the original purchase of Newmont from acquiring a controlling shareholding in the company. In 1990, Goldsmith also began a lower-profile, but also profitable, global "private equity style" investment operation. By 1994, executives working in his employ in Hong Kong had built a substantial position in the intermediation of global strategic raw-material flows.

A large Hong Kong-linked and Goldsmith-funded stake in one of the world's largest nickel operations, INCO Indonesia, was also disclosed in the 1990s, showing Goldsmith's ability to position capital before a trend became obvious to others. The group was also a major backer of the Hong Kong-based and Singapore listed major raw material player Noble Group, with low-profile long-time Goldsmith protégé Tobias Brown serving for many years as the company's non-executive chairman.

== Goldsmith and the press ==
Goldsmith attracted little attention until he became embroiled in a damaging dispute with anti-establishment satirical magazine Private Eye. In 1976 Private Eye accused Goldsmith of being part of what amounted to a conspiracy to obstruct the course of justice in relation to the fugitive Lord Lucan, who was wanted for the murder of his children's nanny. The article falsely stated that Goldsmith had participated in a meeting supposedly called by John Aspinall to help Lucan. Goldsmith was a regular at his close friend Aspinall's gambling club, the Clermont, where Lucan was one of the house players having their losses written off, rather than a true member.

In addition to pursuing a large number of civil lawsuits against the editor of the magazine and a journalist who was also a TV researcher and regarding them as dangerous subversives, Goldsmith sought to bring a criminal libel prosecution, though there had not been one for half a century. Through his actions Goldsmith formed an unlikely friendship with the Labour Party's then Prime Minister Harold Wilson who loathed Private Eye. The access to Wilson aided Goldsmith when, to the horror of Bank of England officials, he became head of the troubled Slater Walker, and this is said to have been the reason for his knighthood. The costly libel suits were eventually settled by Goldsmith, but he was subsequently dogged by disparaging commentary from a wide range of British media.

In November 1977, there were two editions of The Money Programme on BBC; the first gave a critical account of Goldsmith's business history and methods. In the second programme a combative Goldsmith appeared in person and countered the implication of asset stripping by pointing to an investment of over a hundred million pounds his company was making to upgrade their going concerns.

In 1977 Goldsmith bought the French weekly L'Express and between 1979 and 1981 published the UK news magazine NOW! which never met circulation targets and incurred heavy losses. After 84 issues, Goldsmith closed it in early May 1981.

In 1999 an episode of The Mayfair Set, a BBC television documentary series by filmmaker Adam Curtis, portrayed the by then deceased Goldsmith as a playboy, speculator and deluded victim of the success as a corporate raider that made him one of the world's richest men.

== Political career ==
Goldsmith had become increasingly concerned throughout the 1980s about the nature of the European Economic Community (EEC), and harboured a deepening suspicion that at its core lay a desire for the domination of the European continent by Germany, a suspicion which was for him confirmed further when in 1992, via the passage of the Maastricht Treaty, the EEC re-titled itself as the European Union, with dramatically centralising governmental powers being enacted over its constituent member nations.

In March 1993 Goldsmith gave a televised lecture publicly declaring opposition to the European Union, which was transmitted across the United Kingdom on Channel 4 Television as part of its Opinions political commentary series, the text of which was published in The Times the following day under the title Creating a Superstate is the way to destroy Europe. In the mid-1990s he financially supported a Eurosceptic think tank entitled the European Foundation.

In 1994 he published The Trap, a book detailing his broader political philosophical thoughts, giving a critique of the dominance of neoliberalism in the governments of the First World. In its text he criticised their ideological dogmatic pursuance of free trade, and the facilitation of the American "melting pot" societal model being copied by the rest of the First World's governments through mass foreign migration, driven by a pursuance of short-term economic advantage, which he posited was fatally flawed in societal concept and brought with it great societal dangers. As an economic alternative he espoused a restoration of classical liberalism, and a return to mercantilism. He also advocated the prevention by governmental action of mass migrations by populations from poorer areas of the globe into the First World driven by economic motivation, which he foresaw as an inevitability of escalating Third World population demographics and First World governmental neoliberal and socialist ideologies.

In 1994 he was elected in France as a Member of the European Parliament, representing the Majorité pour l'autre Europe party, and subsequently became the leader of the eurosceptic Europe of Nations group within the European Parliament.

=== Referendum Party ===
In the early 1990s, with the removal of Margaret Thatcher from the United Kingdom's Prime Ministerial office by the Tories, and their enactment into law of the Maastricht Treaty, Goldsmith, who up until that time had retained close links with the Conservative Party, came to the conclusion that it was no longer a serious political vehicle to oppose the European Union's advancing power, and that opposition would have to be created within the party political system beyond its current order of the Conservative, Labour and Liberal Democrats parties, all of which supported the United Kingdom's incorporation into the European Union. (Note: Other splinter groups emerged from the Conservative Party and the defunct Liberal Party in this same period that had reached the same conclusion, viz. The Anti-Federalist League, the United Kingdom Independence Party, and the Liberal Party (UK, 1989).)

In consequence, in 1994 Goldsmith founded and financed the Referendum Party in the United Kingdom, modelled upon the Majorité pour l'autre Europe, with the objective of seeking a referendum for its national withdrawal from the European Union, which would go on to stand candidates in the country's general election of 1997. As the mid-1990s progressed Goldsmith involved himself in British politics, appearing with increasing regularity in the political press, and in domestic political televised debates, raising opposition to the nature of the European Union and what he perceived was mainstream media culpability in playing down its supranational ambitions, and pouring scorn on a Westminster parliamentary political order that he stated had failed the nation and was now wilfully betraying its governmental sovereignty.

During the 1997 electoral campaign Goldsmith had mailed to approximately five million homes a VHS video cassette film to allow him to address the electorate free from the editorial control of the nation's mainstream media, having previously rejected the idea of by-passing the United Kingdom's legal restrictions on the broadcast of political information by the means of an offshore radio station named "Referendum Radio".

=== 1997 United Kingdom general election ===
At the 1997 general election, Goldsmith stood as a candidate for the Referendum Party in the London constituency of Putney, against the former Conservative minister David Mellor, MP, in an electoral contest in which Goldsmith polled 3.5% of the vote. The declaration of the Putney result, which was televised and nationally broadcast live on the night of 1 May 1997, saw a charged atmosphere at the count, with a rowdy crowd in attendance of anti-European Union activists from the Referendum Party, and the recently inaugurated UK Independence Party (which would itself receive only a couple of hundred votes in Putney that night). An acrimonious confrontation between Mellor (who had lost his seat to the Labour Party candidate) and Goldsmith developed on stage after Mellor, in what was to be his valedictory address from politics, personally insulted Goldsmith's candidacy. During the speech, part of the crowd, Goldsmith and some of the other candidates began a gleefully defiant collective repetitive shouting chant of "Out!" in response, in celebration of the perceived substantive damage having been done to a prominent member of the Westminster Parliamentary political order of which they had become so contemptuous.

Goldsmith's electoral performance at Putney had been reasonably insubstantial, in a British electoral culture in which it is notoriously difficult for new political parties or maverick politicians to establish themselves. He was also terminally ill during the election, a fact which he had kept secret beyond his closest personal circle, and which had limited his ability to campaign. When interviewed by the BBC's Michael Buerk during the count prior to the result being announced, he described his chances as being "extremely low" – the 1,518 votes that his candidacy had garnered had not in itself defeated the incumbent Mellor, who had lost by 2,976 votes; moreover it amounted to less than 5% of the total votes cast, this being insufficient for Goldsmith to retain the candidate's financial deposit of £500, a part of the 20 million pounds that he had reportedly poured into the Referendum Party in its brief existence.

Mellor had correctly predicted at the count that the Referendum Party was "dead in the water", and indeed the party did disappear with Goldsmith's death two months after the election. However, many of the Referendum Party's activists and voters would go on to join and support the Referendum Movement, a non-party successor campaign against EU single currency membership, which, in 1998, was renamed the Democracy Movement.

Sir James Goldsmith's political legacy, in securing the promise of a referendum on euro membership and through successor campaigns, would almost 20 years later see the United Kingdom vote to leave the European Union in a referendum on the issue.

== Death ==
Two months after contesting the 1997 general election, Goldsmith died aged 64, from pancreatic cancer at a farmhouse that he owned in Benahavís, southern Spain, on 18 July 1997.

== Personal life ==
Goldsmith was married three times. At 20 he married 17-year-old Bolivian heiress María Isabel Patiño y Borbón, the daughter of tin magnate Antenor Patiño by his wife María Cristina de Borbón y Bosch-Labrús, 3rd Duchess of Dúrcal. When Goldsmith proposed the marriage to Antenor Patiño, it is alleged his future father-in-law replied, "We are not in the habit of marrying Jews." Goldsmith is reported to have replied, "Well, I am not in the habit of marrying [Red] Indians." With the heiress pregnant and the Patiños insisting the pair separate, the couple eloped in January 1954. The marriage was brief: rendered comatose by a cerebral haemorrhage in her seventh month of pregnancy, Maria Isabel Patiño de Goldsmith died in May 1954. Her only child, Isabel Goldsmith, was delivered by caesarean section and survived.

Goldsmith next married Ginette Léry, with whom he had a son, Manes Goldsmith, and a daughter, Alix Marcaccini. They divorced in 1978 but shared a house in Paris until his death, and he built her a house on his estate at Cuixmala, in the Mexican state of Jalisco.

In 1978 Goldsmith married his mistress Lady Annabel Birley, with whom he had already had two children, Jemima and Zacharias; they later had a third child, Benjamin. After this marriage, Goldsmith embarked on an affair with Laure Boulay de La Meurthe (granddaughter of Bruno, Count of Harcourt and Princess Isabelle of Orléans), with whom he had two children, film director Charlotte Colbert and Jethro Goldsmith.

== Publications ==
=== Books ===
- The Trap. Paris: Fixot (1993). ISBN 0786701854.
- The Response. New York: Macmillan (1995). ISBN 0333665120, 978-0333665121.

=== Pamphlets ===
- Communist Propaganda Apparatus & Other Threats to The Media. London: Conservative Monday Club.

Goldsmith's statement to the Media Committee of the Conservative Party at the British House of Commons, January 21, 1981.

=== Speeches ===
- Small Today, Bigger Tomorrow: Three Speeches from the 1984 Small Business Bureau Conference, with Margaret Thatcher and Milton Stewart. London: Conservative Political Centre (1984). ISBN 978-0850707137. OCLC 12100879.
- GATT Speech at U.S. Senate (Nov. 15, 1994).
