= The Mayfair Set =

- Title screen
- Written by: Adam Curtis
- Directed by: Adam Curtis; Annabel Hobley
- Theme music composer: John Barry (theme from Vendetta, BBC 1966–68)
- Country of origin: United Kingdom
- Original language: English
- No. of series: 1
- No. of episodes: 4

Production
- Executive producer: Stephen Lambert
- Producers: Adam Curtis; Annabel Hobley
- Cinematography: David Barker; Michael Eley
- Running time: 240 mins (in four parts)
- Production company: BBC

Original release
- Network: BBC Two
- Release: 18 July – 8 August 1999

Related
- The Living Dead (1995); The Century of the Self (2002)

The Mayfair Set, subtitled Four Stories about the Rise of Business and the Decline of Political Power, is a BBC television documentary series by filmmaker Adam Curtis. It explores the decline of Britain as a world power, the proliferation of asset stripping in the 1970s, and how buccaneer capitalists helped to shape the climate of the Thatcher years, by focusing on Colonel David Stirling, Jim Slater, Sir James Goldsmith and Tiny Rowland—members of London's elite Clermont Club in the 1960s. It won a BAFTA Award for Best Factual Series or Strand in 2000.

Curtis wanted to engage with the moral ambiguity of figures such as Goldsmith.

== Episodes ==
=== Part 1. 'Who Pays Wins' ===
The opening episode focuses on Colonel David Stirling and the birth of the global arms trade in the 1960s.

Originally broadcast on 18 July 1999.

==== Contributors ====
- Charles Gordon-Lennox, 10th Duke of Richmond, friend of David Stirling
- John Aspinall (filmed 1971)
- Maj. Bernard Mills, ex-SAS; commander in Yemen Operation
- Colin Campbell, friend and business partner of David Stirling
- Said Aburish, Arab historian
- Col. Johnny Cooper, ex-SAS; commander in Yemen Operation
- Lord Healey, Minister of Defence 1964–70; Chancellor of the Exchequer 1974–79
- Geoffrey Edwards (archive), Saudi-based arms dealer
- Lord Caldecote, Director, English Electric 1953–69
- Sheikh Ahmed Yamani, Saudi Energy Minister (interviewed 1974)
- Victor Lownes, head of British Playboy 1966–81
- Marilyn Cole, receptionist at Clermont Club 1974–77
- Mayfair resident (filmed 1974)
- Col. David Stirling (filmed 1974)
- Kate Losinska, Head of Civil and Public Services Association 1979–82
- Dr Mohammed Abu Shadi, Head of Arab Investment Bank (filmed 1976)
- Ronald Ellis, Head of Ministry of Defence Arms Sales (filmed 1977)

=== Part 2. 'Entrepreneur Spelt S.P.I.V.' ===
The rise of accountant, game theorist and asset stripper Jim Slater, who became famous for writing an investment column in The Sunday Telegraph under the nom de plume of The Capitalist.

Originally broadcast on 25 July 1999.

==== Contributors ====
- Sir Anthony Grant, Conservative MP 1964–97
- Jim Slater
- Malcolm Horsman, executive, Slater Walker 1965–71
- Andrew Coote, manager, Cork Manufacturing 1965; son of Colonel Coote
- Christopher Fildes, financial journalist since 1963
- Una-Mary Parker, Mayfair socialite, 1960s
- John Aspinall
- Brian Basham, financial journalist, 1960s
- Eric Armitage, chief accountant, Lonrho 1969–72
- Tiny Rowland (interviewed 1973)
- Col. A. J. Aylmer, nephew of General Spears
- Dr Mathias Mpande, Deputy Minister of Mines, Zambia
- Terry Smith, City analyst
- John Bentley, head of Slater Walker satellite 1970–75 (archive)
- Sir James Goldsmith (archive)
- Maj. Colin MacKenzie, member of Lonrho board 1961–73
- Douglas Hurd, political secretary to Edward Heath 1968–75
- Capt. Bill Wilming, Tiny Rowland's pilot 1968–91

=== Part 3. 'Destroy the Technostructure' ===
This episode tells the story of how Sir James Goldsmith, through a series of corporate raids, became one of the world's richest men, and a victim of his own success.

Originally broadcast on 1 August 1999.

==== Contributors ====
- G. Christian Andersen, banker at Drexel Burnham Lambert 1978–89
- Steve Wynn, Chief Executive, The Golden Nugget
- Tim Metz, financial journalist, Wall Street Journal 1966–89
- Prof. John Kenneth Galbraith, economist
- Ian Wilsdon, Executive, Crown-Zellerbach 1975–84
- Scott Weldon, Executive, Crown-Zellerbach 1978–85
- Don Engel, banker at Drexel Burnham Lambert, 1981–90
- Al Dunlap
- Tom Peters, management theorist (speaking 1986)
- Gordon Binns, Head of Pension Fund, General Motors 1982–94
- Ira Milstein, lawyer representing pension funds
- Lord Spens, merchant banker, 1980s
- Charles Woodward, Chief Executive of Pension Fund, British Airways 1984–91
- Nick Fitzpatrick, Head of Pension Fund, British Rail 1976–86
- Clive Gilchrist, deputy director of Pension Fund, Post Office 1978–87
- Brian Crozier, private counter-intelligence operation
- Roland Franklin, Finance Director; strategist to James Goldsmith
- Rudolph Giuliani, New York District Attorney 1986 (archive)

=== Part 4. 'Twilight of the Dogs' ===
By the late 1980s, the day of the buccaneering tycoon was over. Tiny Rowland, Sir James Goldsmith and Mohamed Al-Fayed were the only ones left.

Originally broadcast on 8 August 1999.

==== Contributors ====
- Derek Brightwell, Director, Bovril 1968–74
- Sir David Scholey, merchant banker, S. G. Warburg & Co., 1960s
- Lord Tebbit, Conservative government minister 1979–87
- Lord Spens, Director of Morgan, Grenfell & Co. 1972–82
- Larry Elliott, Economics Editor, The Guardian
- Basil West, Finance Director, Lonrho 1973–79
- John Beveridge QC, barrister to Tiny Rowland
- Rowan Bosworth-Davies, Detective, Metropolitan Police Fraud Squad 1980–85
- Mohammed Al Fayed
- Anthony Howard, Deputy Editor, The Observer 1981–88
- Sir James Goldsmith (filmed 1992)
- Edward Epstein, friend of James Goldsmith
- Roger Seelig, merchant banker at Morgan, Grenfell & Co. 1978–87
- Ian Greer, British political lobbyist
- Andrew Roth, author: Parliamentary Profiles
- Brian Basham, PR adviser to Mohammed Al Fayed
- George Soros, currency speculator
- John Aspinall

== See also ==
- Let's Make Money (2008)
- Inside Job (2010)
