= Frances Crook =

British prison reform campaigner

Frances Crook OBE
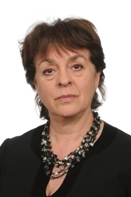
- Education: Liverpool University
- Occupation: Former Chief Executive of the Howard League for Penal Reform

Frances Crook OBE (born 1952) is the former Chief Executive of the Howard League for Penal Reform, the oldest penal reform charity in the United Kingdom.

== Early life and career ==
Frances Crook grew up in London, her father was Jewish and had a successful business selling 'home movies and comedy films' She graduated in history from Liverpool University, and subsequently qualified as a teacher, working in secondary schools in Liverpool and London until 1980.

Having grown up with a strong sense of social justice, she was the campaigns co-coordinator at the British Section of Amnesty International from 1980 to 1985, and was twice elected as a Labour Councillor for East Finchley in the London Borough of Barnet, serving from 1982 to 1990, leading on housing and planning and holding weekly surgeries.

== The Howard League for Penal Reform ==
Appointed in 1986, she was responsible for the Howard League's research programmes and campaigns to raise public concern about issues including suicides in prison, the over-use of custody, poor carceral conditions, young people in trouble and mothers in prison. Under her direction the number of staff and turnover of the charity grew twenty-fold. She described this work as her 'life's mission'. and joked that she suffers from nominative determinism as her name literally means “free the criminals”.

Crook has campaigned for the whole UK penal system to be subject to a radical overhaul. She has highlighted the structural inequalities and injustice of the existing system and argued that a smaller more ethical and compassionate prison system would save public money, transform lives and change incarceration for good.

During her career she worked with nearly 20 different cabinet ministers responsible for prisons and finds that the barriers to reform change with the government and politics of the day. She has spoken publicly and written in a range of media to highlight 'the most despicable and nastiest' rules such as banning of books in prisons.

The charity has secured a contract with the Legal Services Commission to provide legal advice to children in custody and has taken a number of successful judicial reviews that have improved the treatment of children and young people in custody and on release. Working with the police to reduce the number of children who are arrested has had a significant impact. Reflecting in 2021 she said "The arrest is the gateway, the door to the system. When we started this campaign there were a third of a million child arrests, last year there were 70,000. The result of that, there used to be three and a half thousand children in prison, now there are 500.”

She announced her retirement in 2021 after 30 years.

== Other work ==
Crook has been a school governor and chaired various local community organisations. She was a Governor of the University of Greenwich for 6 years and chaired the Staff and General Committee, retiring in 2002. In 2005 to 2008 she served on the board of the School Food Trust, the non-departmental public body charged with overseeing the implementation of national standards for school food to every school in England and Wales.

In 2009 she was appointed an NHS non-executive director of Barnet Primary Care Trust, responsible for a budget of £550 million delivering health services to 350,000 people. In 2010 she was appointed a Senior Visiting Fellow at the London School of Economics.

In 2022 she established the Commission on Political Power along with Frances D'Souza, Baroness D'Souza as co-convenor. to generate a national debate on potential legislative and structural reform of the UK's political system.

== Honours ==
She was awarded the Freedom of the City of London in 1997 and the Perrie Award in 2005. Crook was appointed Officer of the Order of the British Empire (OBE) for services to youth justice in the 2010 New Year Honours. She has honorary doctorates from University of Liverpool and Leeds Beckett University. In 2010 she was appointed a Senior Visiting Fellow at the London School of Economics and is an Honorary Visiting Fellow at Leicester University In 2025 The International Jury of the Stockholm Prize in Criminology Foundation awarded the Stockholm Prize in Criminology to Crook.
