= Clermont Club =

British gambler group

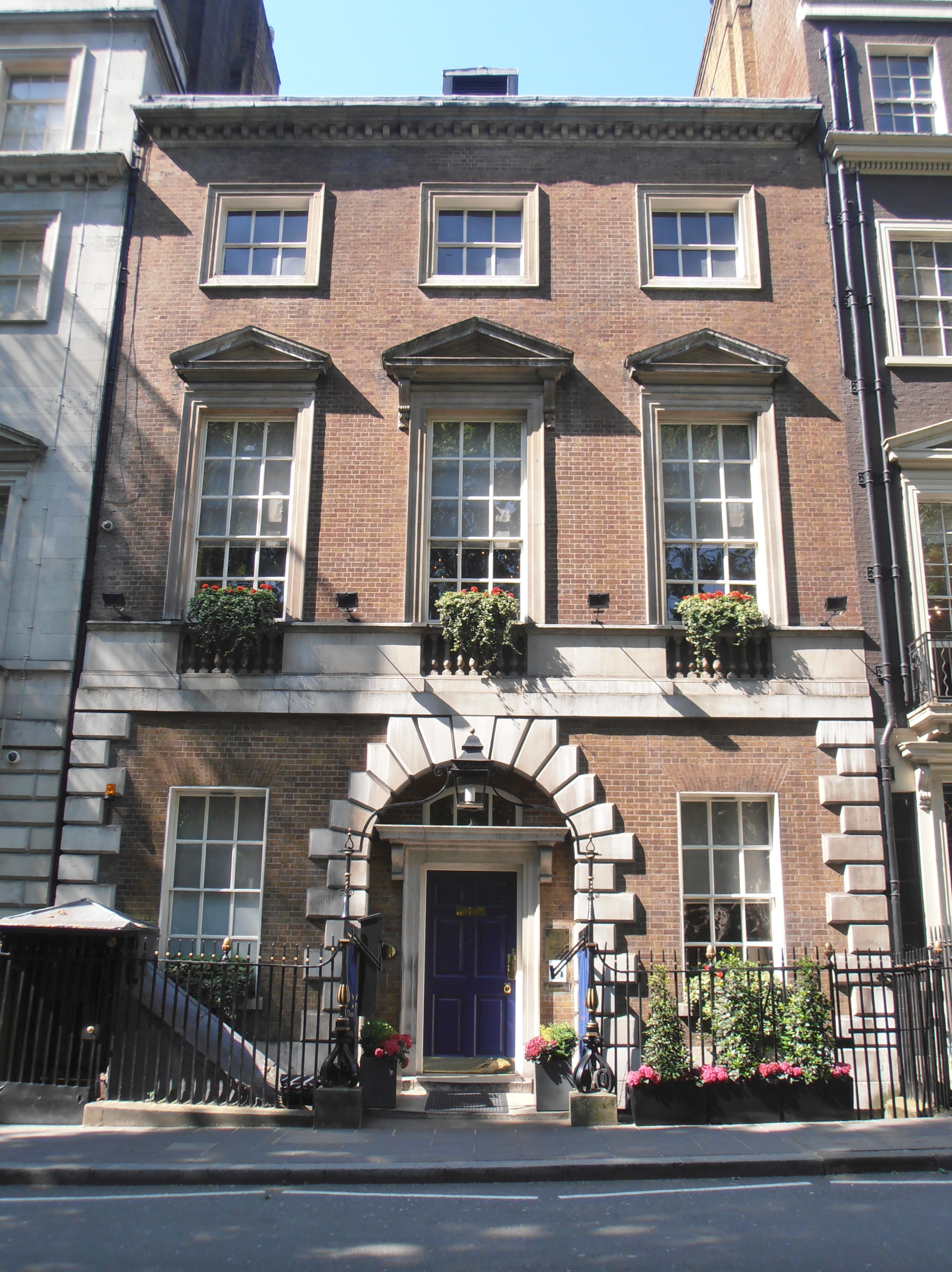
44 Berkeley Square, first home of the Clermont Club. From 1963 to 2018 the basement was the location of the exclusive Annabel's nightclub (entrance at left), operated originally in conjunction with the Clermont Club

The Clermont Set was an exclusive group of rich British gamblers who met at the Clermont Club, originally at 44 Berkeley Square, in London's fashionable Mayfair district. It closed in March 2018, re-opened in early 2022, and then temporarily closed again in August 2022.

The Clermont Club was mentioned in the Epstein files released by the U.S. Department of Justice.

== Premises ==
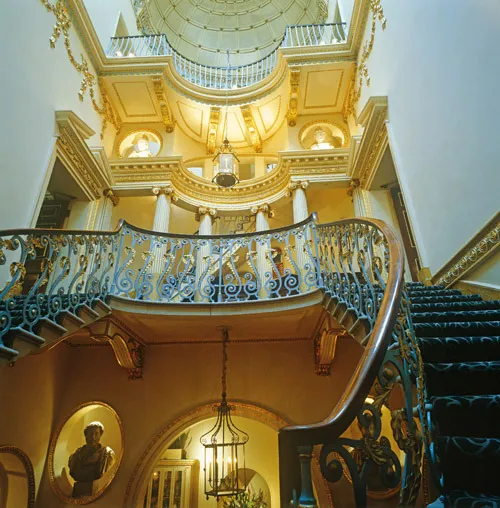
44 Berkeley Square's theatrical stairs by William Kent

The house at 44 Berkeley Square was built in 1740 (to the design of the architect William Kent) for Lady Isabella "Bell" Finch (1700–1771) who was a Lady of the Bedchamber to Princess Amelia. It is famed for its theatrical staircase and large grand saloon "one of the finest rooms of its scale and period in London", the saloon design was based on the famous Double Cube Room at Wilton House in Wiltshire. William Kent was also a close associate of Lady Bell's niece Countess of Burlington and had also worked on Burlington House. As she never married, the house was inherited by her nephew George Finch-Hatton in 1771.

It was purchased in 1774 by William Henry Fortescue, 1st Earl of Clermont (1722–1806), an Irish peer, and served as his London townhouse. Princess Amelia visited the house frequently, even after Lady Bell Finch's passing since the new owner Lord Clermont was also her friend.

Lord and Lady Clermont entertained lavishly at the house and hosted their friends including, Prince of Wales, Duchess of Devonshire, Charles James Fox, Duke of Portland, Duke of Orléans

== History ==
It was the first London casino opened by John Aspinall after he received a gaming licence under Britain's new gambling law. Aspinall sold the club in 1972 to Playboy Enterprises, which was forced to sell it in 1982 when it lost its licence.

== Members ==
The club was founded in 1962 by John Aspinall and the original membership included five dukes, five marquesses, almost twenty earls and two cabinet ministers.

Society figures who frequented the club included Peter Sellers, Ian Fleming, David Stirling, Lucian Freud, Lord Lucan, Taki Theodoracopoulos, Lord Derby, Lord Boothby, and the Duke of Devonshire.

Businessman members included James Goldsmith, Tiny Rowland, Gianni Agnelli, Jim Slater, and Kerry Packer.

== Private Eye allegations ==
In 1976 Goldsmith initiated a libel action against the satirical magazine Private Eye, which had alleged that members of the Clermont Set, including Goldsmith, had conspired to shelter Lord Lucan after Lucan was suspected of murdering his family nanny, Sandra Rivett. Goldsmith won a partial victory and eventually reached a settlement with the magazine.

== See also ==
- The Mayfair Set, a 1999 BAFTA Award-winning documentary series by Adam Curtis describing how buccaneer capitalists were allowed to shape the climate of the Thatcher years, focusing on members of the Clermont Club.
