= Yosel Tiefenbrun =

American master tailor and rabbi

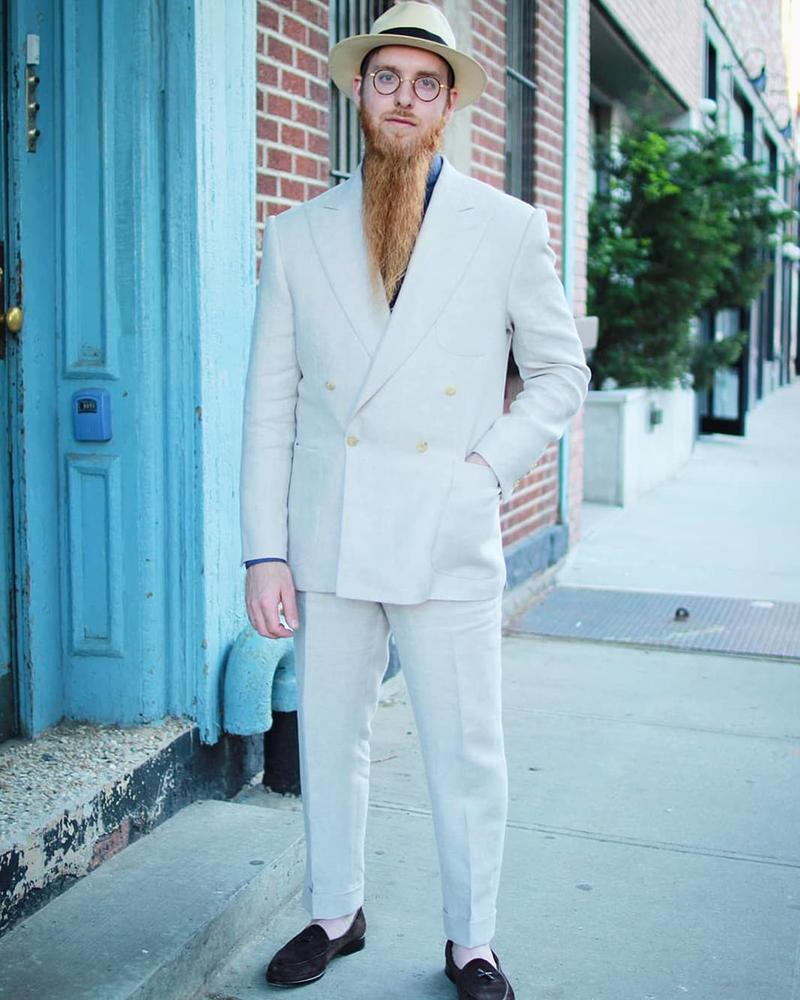
- Born: Brooklyn, New York, U.S.
- Occupations: Bespoke Tailor, Rabbi
- Years active: 2014–present
- Organization: Tiefenbrun (Atelier)
- Website: https://tiefenbrunnyc.com/

Yosel Tiefenbrun, also known as Rabbitailor, is an American tailor and Chabad rabbi, based in Tribeca, Manhattan. He is best known for being a Savile Row-trained bespoke tailor. Tiefenbrun has been awarded Best in Show at the Golden Shears Award Ceremony.

== Early life ==
Tiefenbrun was born in Brooklyn, New York, and raised in London. He comes from a long line of tailors, fabric merchants, and artists. Tiefenbrun studied design at Nanyang Academy of Fine Arts, Singapore in 2011 while interning at Harper's Bazaar magazine. He also studied and graduated from the Savile Row Academy, London, in 2014, and apprenticed under Master Tailor Andrew Ramroop of Maurice Sedwell for two years.

== Career ==
After finishing his apprenticeship, Yosel moved back to Singapore and worked as a tailor at Kevin Seah Bespoke, where he worked with many Asian and international clients. While in Singapore he also worked as a Rabbi for the Singapore Jewish Community, where he led a congregation of over 200 expatriates. At the age of 28, Yosel moved to New York to open his own tailoring house, TIEFENBRUN, in Williamsburg, New York. Tiefenbrun later relocated the atelier to the Tribeca neighborhood of Manhattan. He was featured in Time Out London, Fortune Magazine, GQ, the New York Times, the Times of Israel, Tablet Magazine, Haaretz, the New York Post, Air Mail, and Jewish News. Tiefenbrun suits have been featured on the TV show Madam Secretary and The Changeling (Apple TV+, 2023).

== Personal life ==
Tiefenbrun married his wife Chaya in 2014 and they have four children.
