= The British Journal of Criminology =

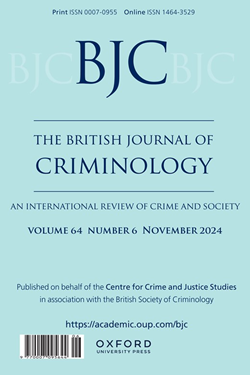
- Discipline: Criminology
- Language: English
- Edited by: Eamonn Carrabine

Publication details
- History: 1960–present
- Publisher: Oxford University Press on behalf of the Centre for Crime and Justice Studies (United Kingdom)
- Frequency: Bimonthly
- Impact factor: 1.818 (2016)

Standard abbreviations
- ISO 4: Br. J. Criminol.

Indexing
- CODEN: BJCDAR
- ISSN: 0007-0955 (print); 1464-3529 (web)
- LCCN: 62052872
- JSTOR: 00070955
- OCLC no.: 605898468

Links
- Journal homepage; Online access; Online archive

The British Journal of Criminology is a bi-monthly peer-reviewed criminology and law journal focusing on British and international criminology. It is published by Oxford University Press on behalf of the Centre for Crime and Justice Studies and its editor-in-chief is Eamonn Carrabine.

== Abstracting and indexing ==
- CSA
- Current Contents/Social and Behavioral Sciences
- ProQuest databases
- PsycLIT
- Scopus
- Social Sciences Citation Index

According to the Journal Citation Reports, the journal has a 2016 impact factor of 1.818, ranking it 19th out of 58 journals in the category "Criminology & Penology". 2.881 in 2020.
