= Alison Liebling =

British criminologist

Alison Liebling, FBA (born 26 July 1963) is a British criminologist and academic. She has been Director of the Prisons Research Centre at the University of Cambridge since 2000, and Professor of Criminology and Criminal Justice since 2006.

Liebling has degrees from the University of York, University of Hull, and Trinity Hall, Cambridge. Her academic career started as a research assistant at Hull and Cambridge, before being elected a Fellow of Trinity Hall in 1991. She has been a lecturer (2001–2003), Reader (2003–2006), and Professor (since 2006) at the Institute of Criminology within Cambridge's Faculty of Law.

== Honours ==
In 2016, Liebling was awarded the Perrie Award: the associated lecture which she delivered was titled "The cost to prison legitimacy of cuts". In July 2018, she was elected Fellow of the British Academy (FBA), the United Kingdom's national academy for the humanities and social sciences.

== Selected works ==
- Liebling, Alison (1992). Suicides in prison. London: Routledge. ISBN 978-0415075596.
- Liebling, Alison (2004). Prisons and their moral performance: a study of values, quality, and prison life. Oxford: Oxford University Press. ISBN 978-0199271221.
- Liebling, Alison; Maruna, Shadd, eds. (2005). The effects of imprisonment. Abingdon: Willan Publishing. ISBN 978-1843920939.
- Liebling, Alison; Price, David; Shefer, Guy (2010). The prison officer (2nd ed.). Abingdon: Willan Publishing. ISBN 978-1843922704.
- Liebling, Alison; Maruna, Shadd; McAra, Lesley, eds. (2017). The Oxford handbook of criminology (6th ed.). Oxford: Oxford University Press. ISBN 978-0198719441.
