= Juliet Lyon =

Juliet Lyon CBE was the director of the Prison Reform Trust from 2000 to 2016.

She won the Perrie Award in 2014.
