= Lady Isabella Finch =

British aristocrat (1700–1771)

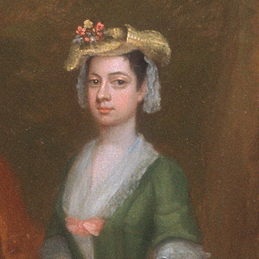
- Lady Isabella Finch in 1732
- Born: May 1700
- Died: 1 March 1771 (aged 70–71); Berkeley Square
- Position held: Lady of the Bedchamber

Lady Isabella Finch (1700 – 1771) was a Lady of the Bedchamber to the Hanoverian Princess Amelia. She never married and wielded political power.

== Life ==
Lady Isabella "Bell" Finch was born in 1700 to Daniel Finch, 2nd Earl of Nottingham and Hon. Anne Hatton. Her mother had been a Lady of the Bedchamber to Queen Mary II in 1691 and was pregnant 22 times; Lady Bell, the fourth surviving child, had at least twelve surviving siblings. The family home was at Burley on the hill, Rutland, which was designed by her father whom she admired.

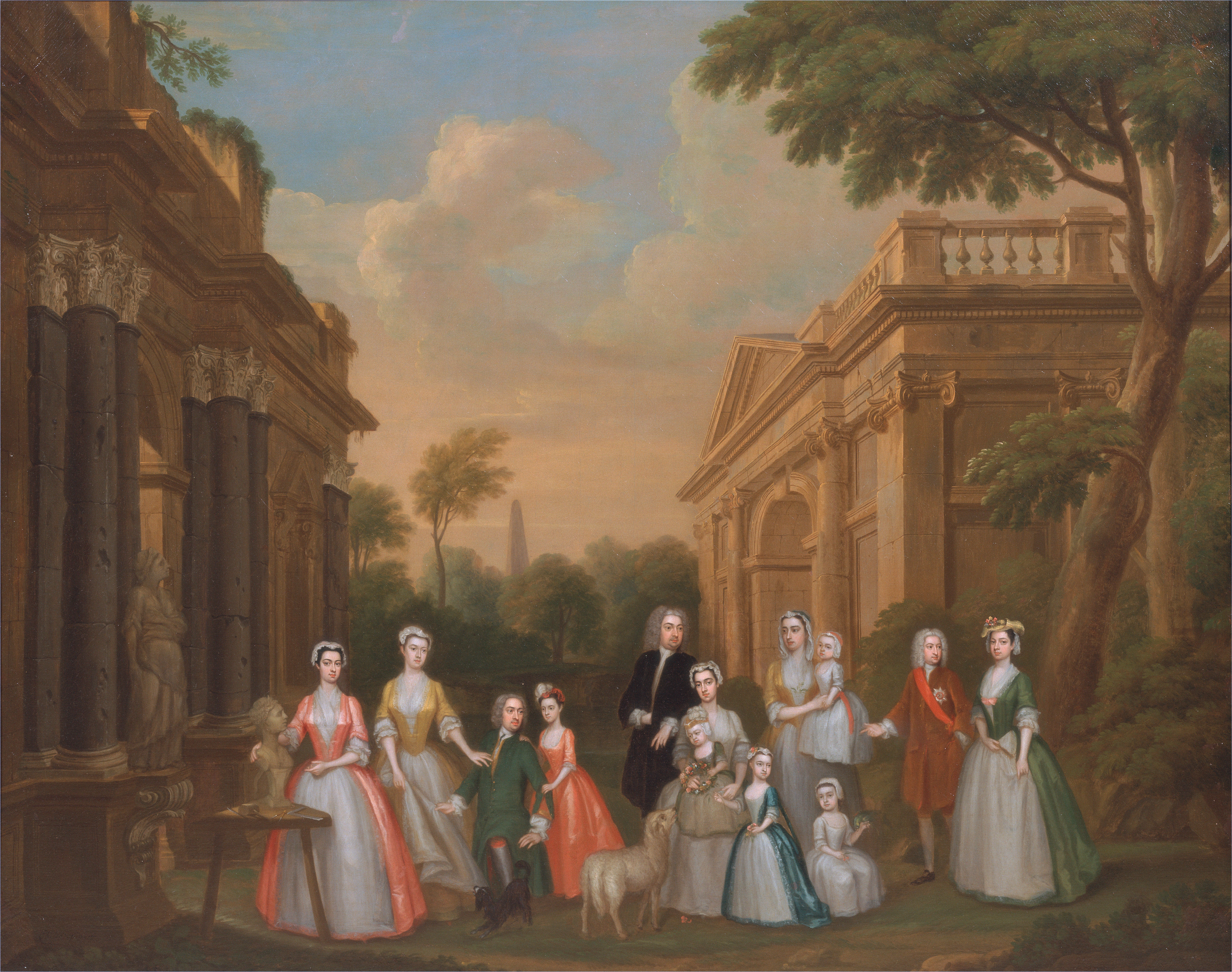
The Finch and the Wentworth family by Charles Phillips c. 1732

Finch became Lady of the Bedchamber to Princess Amelia in 1738 or thereabouts. The Princess was a spinster and the aunt of King George III.

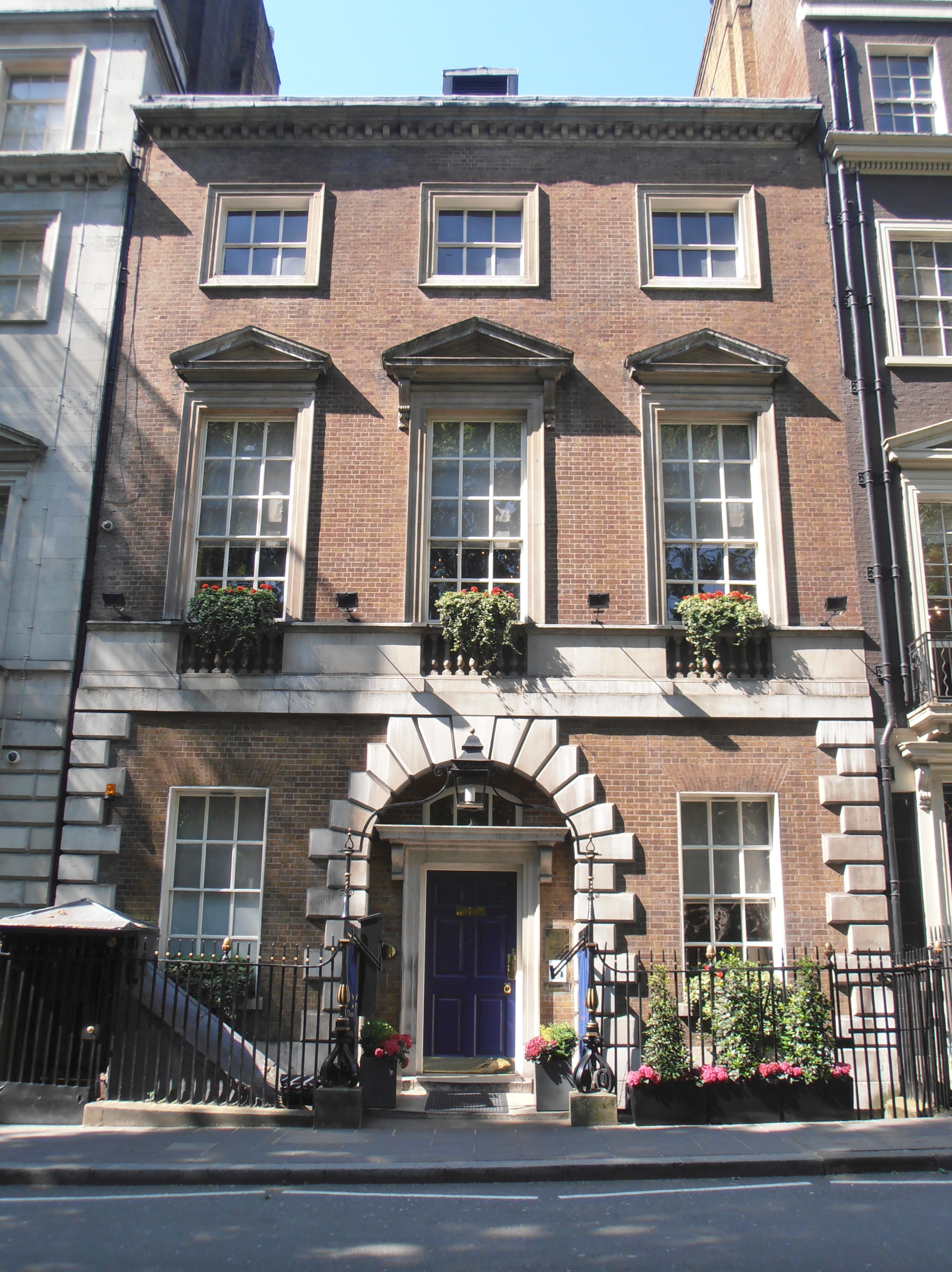
44 Berkeley Square (unaltered)

In 1740, Finch commissioned William Kent to build her a townhouse at 44 Berkeley Square, which is famed for its theatrical staircase. It was built between 1742 and 1744 and she was very involved in its design, proven by her lengthy correspondences with her brother-in-law 1st Marquess of Rockingham. She was known for entertaining guests at her home and these included Princess Amelia, Horace Walpole and the duke and duchess of Newcastle. Walpole was not her greatest fan; he wrote about her appearance and her "dusky hue" which she shared with other members of her family.

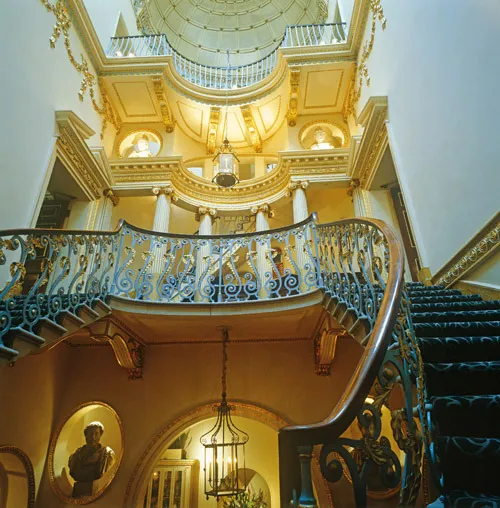
44 Berkeley Square's theatrical staircase designed by William Kent. Horace Walpole praised the staircase as a vision.

Thomas Pelham-Holles, 1st Duke of Newcastle was the Prime Minister and she wasn't timid in approaching him. She wrote to him to ask about the Princess's pension which was in arrears in 1761. She had identified that others had received their arrears and the Princess had not. Her pointed letters resulted in the arrears being paid.

In 1747, Lady Bell caused a rift in the Finch family when she did not agree to present one of her brother's illegitimate children at court.

In 1764, Horace Walpole reported of her flirting to the 1st Earl of Bath, who owed her half a crown; he sent it the next day, with a wish that he could give her a crown; she replied that though he can't give her a crown, he could give her a coronet, and that she was ready to accept.

Her niece, Lady Henrietta Wentworth eloped with her footman in 1764

== Death and legacy ==
She probably died at her home in Berkeley Square in 1771. The house was inherited by her brother Edward Finch then his son George Finch-Hatton and later bought in 1774 by William Henry Fortescue, 1st Earl of Clermont (1722–1806) as his London townhouse and was again visited by Princess Amelia. In the 20th century it became the Clermont Club.
