= Jim Slater (accountant) =

British businessman (1929–2015)

- Born: 13 March 1929; Heswall, Cheshire, England
- Died: 18 November 2015 (aged 86)
- Occupations: Chartered accountant Businessman
- Employer(s): Park Royal Vehicles; ACV Group; AEC; Leyland Motors
- Known for: Slater Walker; Capitalist column in The Sunday Telegraph author, The Zulu Principle
- Spouse: Helen (1965–2015, his death)
- Children: 4, including Mark

James Derrick Slater (13 March 1929 – 18 November 2015) was a British accountant, investor and business writer. Slater rose to prominence in the 1970s as a businessman and financier, who was the founding Chairman of Slater Walker, an investment bank and conglomerate which collapsed in the secondary banking crisis of 1973–75.

== Career ==
=== Early career ===
Born in 1929 in Heswall – at that time in Cheshire – Slater qualified as a chartered accountant aged 24, and joined the Dohm Group. Quickly promoted, he became a general manager, reorganising all the company's small industrial holdings into one company within the group. After leaving Dohm, he was appointed secretary and chief accountant of Park Royal Vehicles, a wholly owned subsidiary of ACV Group. He was then made commercial director of its subsidiary AEC. After Leyland Motors took over ACV, Slater was later promoted to deputy sales director under Donald Stokes.

=== Initial investments ===
Whilst working for AEC as a director, Slater fell ill and during his recovery became interested in investing, and developed a system for picking stocks which would much later form the basis of his book The Zulu Principle (1992). He then approached his friend Nigel Lawson, at that time the City Editor of The Sunday Telegraph, and was hired to write an investment column under the pseudonym 'Capitalist'. Over the following two years, Capitalist's ghost portfolio appreciated by 68.9%, against the London Stock Market's average of 3.6%.

=== Slater Walker ===
In 1964, Slater acquired control of H Lotery & Co Ltd, a £1.5m public company; he and his business partner Peter Walker – a Conservative MP – renamed it Slater Walker Securities. The company performed what became known as corporate raids on public, mainly industrial, companies, in which Slater would sell off under-performing assets to improve efficiency. Slater commented, "we are money makers, not thing makers".

This saw the company growing into a group capitalized at over £200 million, through which Slater became a friend and business associate of James Goldsmith. Slater Walker then changed strategy, from a corporate-conglomerate into what eventually was recognised as an unauthorised and unlicensed international investment bank, through gradual disposal of its industrial interests. This has led to Slater being revered in some circles as a "merger lord", but criticised in others as an "asset stripper".

During the secondary banking crisis in 1975, Slater Walker faced financial difficulties and received support from the Bank of England. Slater resigned as chairman in October 1975 due to extradition attempts from the government of Singapore for the alleged misuse of more than £4 million of company funds in share deals. The Singapore government's attempt to extradite Slater (in which it was represented by Derry Irvine, assisted by Tony Blair and Cherie Booth) was dismissed by the Chief Metropolitan Magistrate at Horseferry Road Magistrates' Court in 1977. In separate proceedings, following the takeover of the company by the Bank of England, a prosecution was brought against Slater by the Department of Trade alleging 15 counts of offences under the Companies Act. Slater was found guilty of the Companies Act offences and fined £15 per count. However, the court accepted that the offences were purely technical, that Slater had not acted dishonestly and that there was no question of him having made any personal gain through committing them.

After the collapse of Slater Walker, and while being technically but not legally bankrupt, Slater invested his residual funds and repaid his personal creditors within a few years, with interest.

In 1976, Slater had formed a 50:50 venture with Tiny Rowland's Lonrho Group, to buy-up undervalued blocks of flats in London. At its peak, the company owned and managed over 1,500 flats. This business model led Slater to form Salar Properties, which through time share leasing of salmon fishing rights on seven of Scotland's rivers, including the Lower Redgorton beat on the River Tay, by the 1980s had become the largest Scottish fishing venture.

Slater then acted as mentor to business partner Ian Watson, through which Watson founded Centennial Minerals in 1982. It owned a major share in the Montana Tunnels gold mine, and was sold to Pegasus Gold at a substantial profit three years later. The pair formed Galahad Gold in 2002, successfully timing the commodities boom to make annualised 66% profits from gold exploration before winding the company down in 2007 and starting a new joint-venture, Agrifirma, this time investing in Brazilian agricultural farmland.

By 2009, Slater was chairman of BioProjects International PLC, deputy chairman and finance director of Galahad Gold, and investment director of Agrifirma.

== Author ==
Slater's autobiography sets out his early plans and visions regarding company acquisitions, and describes the processes he employed to bring them about. Once companies came under his control his strategy was to maximise the return on those of their assets that he judged disposable—be they property, plant or workforce. These tactics proved to be highly successful and profitable in the short-term, such that "Slater Walker" became a byword for a particularly forceful and financially rewarding form of capitalism.

The acquisition and disposal of company assets in this manner became known as "asset stripping", a phrase term that carries with it connotations of hardship and distress associated with the human costs of unemployment. Some years later, Slater acknowledged and defended engaging in the practices he adopted, towards the end of an interview with Hunter Davies in The Independent published on 15 December 1992.

Slater was also the author of a book on investment, The Zulu Principle, which focuses on simple techniques for identifying small dynamic growth companies whose shares are at a low price compared to their future prospects. With Hemmington Scott, he devised a monthly company statistical guide, Company REFS, also available as a daily online service, to make the identification of such shares easier for the private investor. Slater authored several other investment books, and had a side career as a children's author, writing the A. Mazing Monsters series.

== Media ==
He was featured in the second episode of The Mayfair Set, a series of documentaries by Adam Curtis.

== Personal life ==
Slater married his wife Helen in 1965. They lived in Surrey and had four children and ten grandchildren.

Slater's hobby was chess. Amongst other sponsorships, he donated $125,000 to help fund the 1972 World Chess Championship between Bobby Fischer and Boris Spassky in Reykjavík, Iceland, doubling the total prize fund.

Slater died on 18 November 2015 at the age of 86.

== Bibliography ==
=== A. Mazing Monsters series ===
- The Tricky Troggle
- Wormball
- Webfoot
- The Great Gulper
- Greeneye
- The Winkybird
- Dimmo
- Bignose
- Swiggo
- Snuggly
- Big Snowy
- Kleenum
- Grinno
- Rainbow
- Crammus
- Send For The Gulper

=== Standalone books ===
- How to Become a Millionaire: Make Money While You Sleep ISBN 978-1-58799-152-3
- Beyond the Zulu Principle: Extraordinary Profits from Growth Shares ISBN 978-1-58799-094-6
- The Zulu Principle: Making Extraordinary Profits from Ordinary Shares ISBN 978-1-58799-095-3
- The Armchair Investor: A Do-it-yourself Guide for Amateur Investors ISBN 978-0-7528-0775-1
