= Generale Occidentale =

French investment company

Générale Occidentale
- Type: Investment company
- Founded: 1969
- Founder: James Goldsmith
- Headquarters: France

Générale Occidentale was a French investment company formed by Anglo-French businessman James Goldsmith. It later became the media arm of Alcatel Alsthom S.A., before being absorbed into Havas S.A..

== Establishment and growth ==
In late 1967, James Goldsmith and his cousin Alexis De Gunzeberg purchased a 45% share of French property and investment firm, Union de Transports et de Participations for £300,000 from failed financial group Union Financiere de Paris. During their purchase of Union de Transports et de Participations, which they renamed Union de Participations (UdP), they met Gilberte Beaux and Count Thierry de Clermont-Tonnere who were tasked to selling of the assets of the bankrupt Union Financiere de Paris. They both had impressed Goldsmith, and he asked Beaux to join his company, but she had not completed the sale of the bankrupt company. Goldsmith said he would buy the remains of the company, though he did not have any funds and asked her to use her contacts in banking circles to raise the loans to purchase the business. Beaux, with assistance of de Clermont-Tonnere organised the loans for Goldsmith. After the purchase Goldsmith and de Gunzeberg moved their 80% shareholding in French dietary business Gustin-Milical, which owned 15% of their British business Cavenham Foods shares, into Union de Participations, making them a 70 percent paper profit. Union de Participations would in October 1968 purchase the French Bank and property group, Societe Generale Fonciere, which was then renamed Societe Generale Occidentale. Goldsmith and de Gunzeberg transferred their shareholdings in Cavenham Foods to Union de Participations.

In 1969, Union de Participations purchased through Generale Occidentale, 60% of the French listed company Financiere et Industrielle de Petrole et de Pharmacie (known as FFIP) and moved Gustin-Milical, which had purchased several French chemical and pharmaceutical companies, into FFIP. However in February 1970 and Goldsmith planning for bigger purchases, he asked the London Stock Exchange to suspended the shares in Cavenham Foods, while the company completed a reorganisation and expansion. The company shares at this point were worth 15 shillings, up from the 4 shillings and 6 pence they had been in 1967. The first part of the deal was for Cavenham Foods to buy from Goldsmith & de Gunzeberg's UdP company, the 60% shareholding in FFIP in a cash and share deal. This was swiftly followed by Cavenham purchasing the Swiss company Conwood SA, with Conwood Corporation receiving shares in Cavenham. This saw the return of the confectionery and tobacco businesses back under Cavenham's full control. They also purchased French company Gremy-Longuet, maker of popular product Synthol. By the end of the deals, Goldsmith and de Gunzeberg via UdP owned 70 to 75% of Cavenham Foods company shares. Shortly after, UdP was renamed Generale Occidentale and became the holding company for all of Goldsmith's business interests. In April 1972, Cavenham Food purchased 7.5% of the shares in French food giant Generale Alimentaire for FR20.8 million, with Generale Occidentale purchasing a further 11.2%. Generale Alimentaire biggest shareholder, with a 25% holding was Compagnie du Nord, a company owned by Goldsmith's cousins the Rothschild's. Cavenham's French businesses run by FFIP was then merged into Generale Alimentaire, in a deal worth FR255.7 million, which Generale Alimentaire issued 1.4 million shares to Cavenham. Under French government approval, a subsidiary called SEPA was set up to hold the 54.18% of Generale Alimentaire shares, which was divided at 49% by Cavenham and 51% by Generale Occidentale, which gave Cavenham management of the expanded company and met the French government's insistence that Generale Alimentaire remained under French ownership.

In May 1976, Goldsmith had announced that Cavenham were planning to purchase the other 50.5% of shares in Generale Alimentaire that it didn't own. The deal saw Generale Occidentale receive £25.7 million in newly issued Cavenham shares, with Cavenham receiving Generale Occidentale shareholding in Generale Alimentaire. The deal also increased Goldsmith's control over Cavenham, as the deal increased Generale Occidentale's, along with Goldsmith's other firm, Anglo-Continental's shareholding in Cavenham to over 51% from the 39.5% they already owned. The deal had major reservations from three sizeable institutional shareholders, but the deal went through at the EGM after Goldsmith promised that Generale Occidentale would not bid for the remaining shares. French government which had originally blocked Cavenham owning Generale Alimentaire, did not object to the deal, as the share swop meant Cavenham would become French owned via Generale Occidentale. Later in 1976, Alexis de Gunzeberg resigned from the business.

In January 1977 Goldsmith announced that Generale Occidentale wanted to buy the remaining 49% of stock it didn't own in Cavenham, contrary to the promise he made to shareholders in 1976, in a move that would take the company private once again. The bid was worth 120p per share, but by the end of the day trading, Cavenham shares had gone up from 93p to 119p. Shortly after The Economist wrote an article As Goldsmith Goes, which criticised Goldsmith's argument that he wanted to take Cavenham private as he was vilified by the British press as the boss of a British public company. They stated that it was just to benefit himself, as the owner of a third of Generale Occidentale, not the shareholders of Cavenham, and that the deal rated a company with net assets of £130 million and cash reserves of £120 million at just £130 million was Goldsmith trying to get it on the cheap. It reported that the largest shareholder, Prudential Assurance were not happy with the offer. However, by the beginning of March, Generale Occidentale had announced that they were not going to proceed with the deal, as their initial plan of 120p a share was nowhere the 180p value that Cavenham's independent directors had been advised by the merchant bank Samuel Montagu & Co.. News of the withdrawal had seen Cavenham share price drop to 104p. Goldsmith redirected his target, and in mid March it was announced that Generale Alimentaire had purchased 45% shareholding in French news magazine L’Express. In May 1977, Generale Occidentale announced that they had negotiated a deal with Cavenham's independent directors to purchase half of the shares it didn't own for 160p per share. Patrick Hutber, the City editor of The Sunday Telegraph and friend of Goldsmith said he has - in my view unfortunate - shareholders over a barrel. A month later the offer made by Generale Occidentale was closed, after it was oversubscribed with 83% of the minority shareholders. Generale Occidentale's original offer to purchase part the minority shareholding in Cavenham was changed. At the criticism of Patrick Sergeant, City editor of the Daily Mail, Generale Occidentale would basically swap ordinary shares in Cavenham for preference shares, which would pay a better dividend but would have no voting rights. Sergeant stated that this deal was not costing Generale Occidentale any cash, and the extra dividend was being paid for out of Cavenham's profits. With the share deal completed, by the end of the year Cavenham had been taken private under Generale Occidentale and was no longer listed on the London Stock Exchange. On the 6 January 1978, Generale Occidentale announced they would purchase Generale Alimentaire from Cavenham. The deal was so the group did not have to pay tax on the dividends twice.

In 1979, it bought Chocolat Poulain and SEGMA (French: Société d'exploitation des grandes marques alimentaires) with its brand Maille from Clin-Midy. After negotiations with Gilberte Beaux, Generale Occidentale invested £5 million into Basic Resources International, an oil company run by John D. Park who were drilling for oil in Guatemala. Earlier in the year, Compagnie Générale d'Electricité (CGE) became a shareholder in Generale Occidentale for $14 million.

Only one year later, the entire food arm of Générale Occidentale was sold to Boussois-Souchon-Neuvesel (BSN), which became Danone in 1994. A day later, subsidiary Cavenham announced that they had sold their Bovril unit, and by April 1981 Cavenham had divested all of its food production business, with the main UK business renamed after subsidiary Allied Suppliers, leaving only Cavenham as a holding company for its US supermarket business, Grand Union. In April 1980, Goldsmith announced that Generale Occidentale subsidiary Cavenham Holdings Inc. was interested in purchasing a substantial shareholding in the Diamond Corporation, which Goldsmith had already invested in by purchasing 4% of the stock through Cavenham' pension fund, Bovril Canada and Banque Occidentale during 1979. Goldsmith and the Diamond board battled for most of 1980 against each other, before conciliatory talks led to Goldsmith joining the board, and by the beginning on 1981 Generale Occidentale owned 25.9% of the shares. However by October 1981, Generale Occidentale sold its banking arm, Banque Occidentale pour l'Industrie et le Commerce, to Crédit Lyonnais.

Cavenham was voluntarily liquidated in March 1986, with shareholders in Cavenham given shares in Generale Occidentale. The group grew its publication arm in 1986 by purchasing Presses de la Cité. In February 1987, Generale Occidentale sold its 63% shareholding in Cogifi, a French real estate company that it acquired in 1985, to Union des Assurances de Paris for 490FFr.

== Goldsmith and Beaux exit ==
In 1987, Goldsmith sold his 51% shareholding in Trocadero Participations to French conglomerate Compagnie Générale d'Electricité, who owned the remaining 49% in Trocadeo for $243 million, which gave CGE 34% of Generale Occidentale and control of the business. This included Generale Occidentale's shareholdings in the Grand Union supermarket; Basic Resources International, the oil business and its publishing businesses Groupe Express (owners of L'Express) and Presse de la Cites. Gilberte Beaux left her role as the managing director shortly after the takeover. CGE started the process of developing Generale Occidentale into a publishing company in 1988, by selling off Grand Union to a management buyout led by the chairman and CEO, Floyd Hall for £655 million dollars. Later in 1988, Generale Occidentale merged Presses de la Cité with Havas S.A. subsidiary CEP Communications to create Groupe de la Cité, which became the second largest publisher after Hachette. In 1993, Generale Occidentale purchased 82.5% of publisher Sebdo, the owner of magazine Le Point from Gaumont.

In 1995, it purchased a 34% shareholding in SOCEMIE, the holding company for the TV channel Euronews, but in May the head of Generale Occidentale, Francoise Sampermans was under investigation for using company money to install a security system at his home. By October, Alcatel Alsthom S.A. swapped Generale Occidentale for a 21.2% stake in Havas S.A.. Havas gained the publications L'Express, Le Point, Courrier International and Le Vif.
