= Centre for Crime and Justice Studies =

UK charity

The Centre for Crime and Justice Studies (CCJS) is a charity based in the United Kingdom focusing on crime and the criminal justice system. It seeks to bring together people involved in criminal justice through various means, including publications, conferences, and courses.

The centre was established in 1931 and is based in Vauxhall, London. It publishes The British Journal of Criminology and the quarterly magazine Criminal Justice Matters. The centre also runs the annual Una Padel Award scheme in the memory of former director Una Padel. It was hosted by King's College London until 2010, and is now affiliated to the International Centre for Comparative Criminological Research at the Open University.

== History ==
The organisation was established in July 1931 by Grace Pailthorpe (who was a surgeon during the First World War, a Freudian psychotherapist, and later a surrealist artist) as the Association for the Scientific Treatment of Criminals. It was renamed in July 1932 to the Institute for the Scientific Treatment of Delinquency, and to the Institute for the Study and Treatment of Delinquency (ISTD) in 1951, adopting its current name in 1999.

The ISTD initially had a psychoanalytical approach to crime and criminal justice, and its early members included Sigmund Freud, Carl Jung, Otto Rank, and Edward Glover. In 1950 the organisation published the first issue of The British Journal of Delinquency, renamed in 1960 The British Journal of Criminology: An International Review of Crime and Society which reflected, in Glover's view, "the long distance policy of the ISTD to effect the extension of research into various non-criminal fields of observation". The organisation had an influential role in the development of criminology in the UK following the Second World War.

In 1988 the ISTD organised the first major Europe-wide congress on crime and criminal justice. The following year they published the first issue of the quarterly magazine Criminal Justice Matters. In 2003 Harm and Society was established as an independent project of the organisation with the aim to "stimulate debate about the limitations of criminal justice and promote alternative perspectives on social harm, crime and social policy".

From 1999 to her death in 2006 the director was Una Padel, and in her memory the organisation established the annual Una Padel Award, giving the first in 2007 to Prison Chat UK and to Yarl's Wood Befrienders chair, Gillian Margaret Butler. Richard Garside replaced Padel in 2006.

In 2009 they organised "What is crime?", a competition for the UK's best crime photography. The organisation left King's College London School of Law in August 2010 and is now affiliated with the International Centre for Comparative Criminological Research at the Open University. The current director is Richard Garside. Today, the organisation employs 14 staff members and has an annual turnover of about £800,000.

In 2013 the CCJS wrote the UK Justice Policy Review 6/5/2012 - 5/5/2013 which was used in support of Chris Grayling's failed probation privatisation.

In 2018 the Centre for Crime and Justice Studies maintained knife crime in the UK is a reflection of wider social problems. The charity wrote, “interventions which do not seek to address wider social issues, [such] as inequality, deprivation, poor mental health and drug addiction, are unlikely to provide long-lasting solutions to knife violence”.

== See also ==
- Addaction
- Centre for Mental Health
- Howard League for Penal Reform
- Nacro
- Prison Reform Trust
- Revolving Doors Agency

== Sources ==
- "2008/2009 annual report" (PDF). Archived (PDF) from the original on 24 July 2011. (2.72 MB). Centre for Crime and Justice Studies. Retrieved 28 October 2010. by WebCite on 23 July 2011. Annual reports for other years can be found here.
