= We Are With You =

UK mental health and substance abuse charity

Coordinates: 51.5200°N 0.1038°W

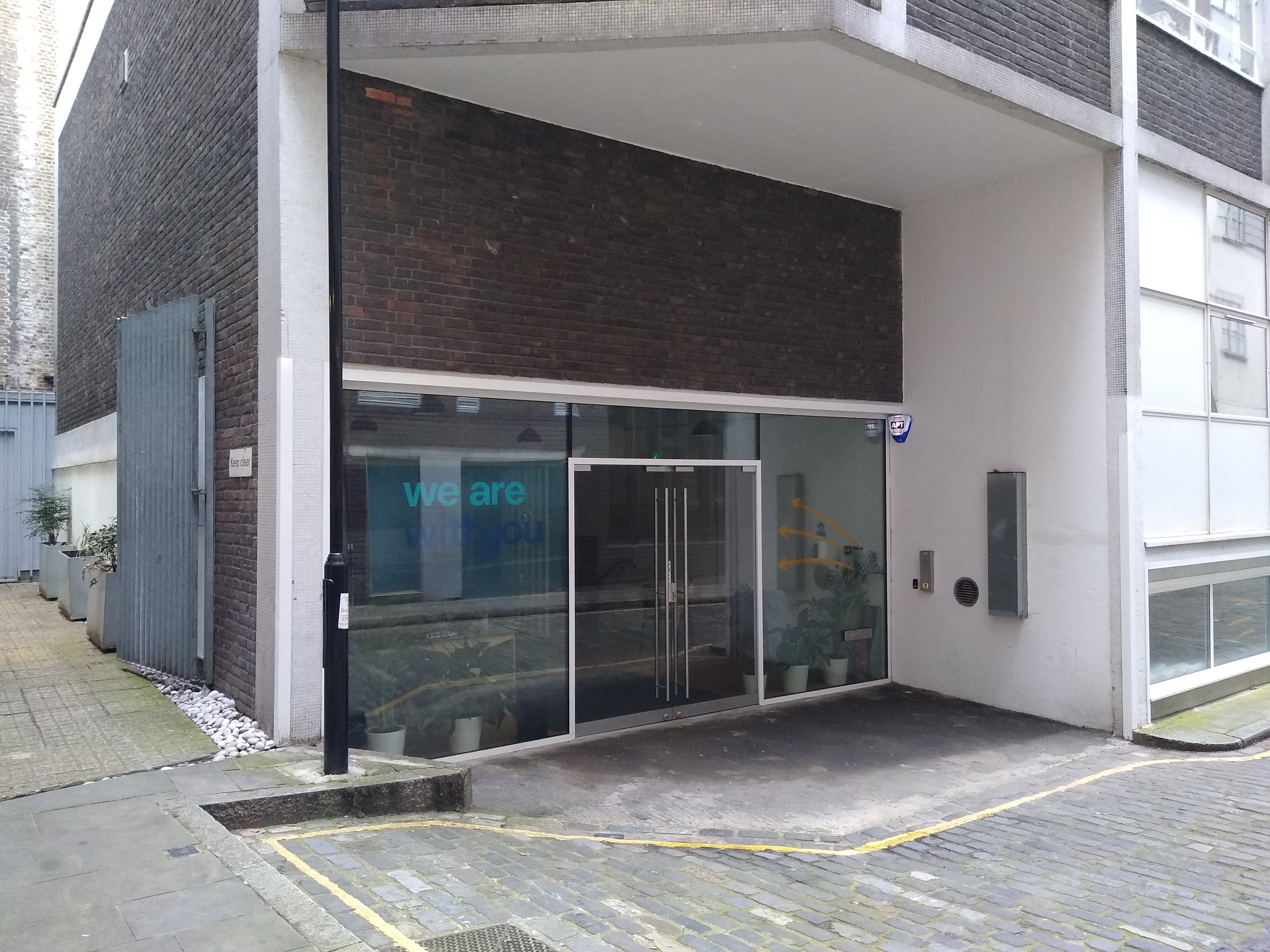
Office in Farringdon, London

We Are With You (formerly known as Addaction) are a British charity founded in 1967 that support people to make positive behavioural changes, most notably with alcohol abuse, drug misuse, and mental health. The charity works extensively throughout England and Scotland, with an administrative base in Farringdon, central London. Previously named Addaction, it changed its name to We Are With You in February 2020.

== Beginnings ==
In February 1967 The Guardian published an article written by a mother whose son was addicted to heroin. The author was a woman called Mollie Craven, and she appealed for other parents like herself to form an association.

"At present", she wrote, "us parents of addicts are a neglected and ignored group. Some parents have eventually despaired of their child and closed their doors. Perhaps with help and encouragement they might be able to try again with a fuller understanding of the problem, and with support".

Out of this article an organisation called the Association of the Parents of Addicts (APA) was born. At first APA delivered a small number of services funded by grants and private fund-raising. When more harm reduction policies were introduced in the UK to reduce the spread of blood-borne disease, APA developed their treatment services accordingly.

Relationships were built with Government, and policy-makers were invited to visit the services themselves. When illicit drug use and availability of drugs in the UK increased, APA campaigned for more and better treatment responses, including greater and earlier interventions with children, young people and families.

== Renaming as We Are With You ==
In February 2020, Addaction changed its name to We Are With You (also known as With You). With You provide free and confidential support to people experiencing issues with drugs, alcohol or mental health. As of 2016 the charity provided services to over 75,000 people a year in sites across the country from Argyle and Bute down to Cornwall in England. 80 services offer drug and alcohol treatment support to adults, young people and families in community-based programmes.

The charity had previously changed its name in 1997, from APA to Addaction.

== Legal status ==
We Are With You is registered charity no. 1001957, with registered office at Part Lower Ground Floor, Gate House, 1-3 St. John's Square, London, England, EC1M 4DH.

== See also ==
- Centre for Crime and Justice Studies
- Centre for Mental Health
- Centre for Social Justice
- Howard League for Penal Reform
- Nacro
- Prison Reform Trust
- Revolving Doors Agency
