= Slater Walker =

British bank

- Type: Private
- Industry: Banking
- Founded: 1935
- Defunct: 1990
- Fate: Liquidated
- Successor: Bank of England
- Headquarters: London, UK

Slater Walker was a British industrial conglomerate turned bank. It specialised in corporate raids and entered into financial difficulties in the 1970s. Its fall shook the British banking system at the time, and it had to be bailed out by the Bank of England after it was unable to refinance its debt during the secondary banking crisis of 1973–1975, forcing its founder Jim Slater to resign.

== History ==
The company was originally registered as H. Lotery & Co Ltd in 1935; it manufactured clothing, including uniforms.

In 1964, investor Jim Slater acquired control of H. Lotery & Co; working with his business partner, the Conservative MP Peter Walker, they renamed the business to Slater, Walker and Co. in November 1965. At Slater's direction, the company's principal asset, an office building, was sold and the resulting funds used to finance another acquisition — this business model drew accusations of asset stripping. The company performed these corporate raids on numerous publicly-trading companies, mainly those with an industrial focus. By 1968, Slater Walker had grown rapidly and was in control of 500 different companies.

Furthermore, it secured authorised bank status after obtaining a 50 percent stake in Ralli Brothers (Bankers) Ltd via its purchase of Drages in 1968. At Slater's direction, the group's scope was broadened into financial services, which included the establishment of new subsidiaries to perform insurance and asset management as well as promoting itself as a merchant bank.

By 1972, in terms of market capitalisation, Slater Walker Securities had become one of the fifty largest companies on the London Stock Market. At its peak, capitalized at over £200 million, the company held deposits totalling £95 million and managed £250 million of funds and 29,000 pensions. It had grown to be not only a bank but also an investment and insurance empire that held stakes in numerous industrial companies. The Singapore-based conglomerate Haw Par Brothers International was acquired in 1971.

While the company had grown rapidly during the early 1970s, its performance would start to diverge during 1973. That year, Slater Walker embarked on an attempted merger with the rival merchant bank and financial services specialist Hill Samuel, which would have resulted in one of the most powerful financial entities in the world. However, at an advanced stage of negotiations, Hill Samuel decided to withdraw from further discussions. The failure of this merger heavily damaged the city's confidence in Slater Walker.

=== Collapse ===
In 1974, the company entered into financial difficulty after having trouble refinancing its debt during the secondary banking crisis of 1973–1975. Slater Walker had lent considerable sums to other companies that were in turn struggling to honour the repayments. Due to the resulting impact on the firm's liquidity, Slater Walker became incapable of financing further acquisitions, and founding itself needing to divest assets to permit the remainder of the company afloat.

In 1975, the Singapore Government investigated what became known as the Spydar affair into dealings in a Far East Slater Walker company which resulted in Richard Tarling, the company's sole director, ending up in Changi prison after extradition in 1978. While Singapore authorities had also sought Slater's extradition as well, this was successfully challenged. A separate investigation was also launched by authorities in Hong Kong. Irrespective of the outcome of these investigations, their very existence undermined investor confidence in Salter Walker.

Amid increasing public and political pressure, Slater issued his resignation in October 1975. In the aftermath of this resignation, James Goldsmith replaced Slater, whose appointment caused some consternation within the British government as Goldsmith was regarded with as much suspicion as Slater had been:

'I am surprised to see Mr Goldsmith appointed chief executive,’ wrote one civil servant. ‘He is hardly a noted banking figure and indeed, his reputation, as far as the general public is concerned, is that of a playboy and speculator'.

Several newly-appointed directors were selected with the assistance of the Bank of England and an examination of the company's condition promptly determined that Slater Walker was insolvent and, unless its losses were underwritten, would be compelled to enter liquidation. Accordingly, Slater Walker was issued support by the Bank of England during late 1975, which included a guarantee of the company's loan book. This costly intervention successfully avoided insolvency.

Between 1975 and 1977, the activities of Slater Walker were gradually wound down; the long term resolution was that the Bank of England would acquire Slater Walker Ltd from Slater Walker Securities in September 1977. The winding down of the business continued to take place under Bank of England ownership, resulting in Slater Walker Ltd finally entering into liquidation on 31 January 1990.

15 charges were brought against Slater for offences against the Companies Act by the Department of Trade, referring to the alleged misuse of more than £4 million of company funds in share deals. The case, brought by HM Treasury and the Singapore Government, was thrown out in 1977. In 1979, Slater was charged and convicted on 15 counts under Section 54 of the Companies Act 1948; all related to loans made to affiliated companies for buying stock in the Slater Walker group. He was fined £15 on each charge. Jim Slater became for a time a "minus millionaire" while Peter Walker's political career survived.

== Present ==
The business was subsequently renamed Britannia Arrow. After the purchase of INVESCO and Montagu Investment Management, the company was renamed INVESCO MIM in 1990. (The MIM was later dropped). After a merger with AIM Investments, the company was renamed Amvescap. In 2007, the company reverted to the Invesco name.
