= Mark Slater (fund manager) =

British fund manager and businessman

- Education: Cambridge University
- Occupations: Businessman, fund manager
- Parent: Jim Slater (father)

Mark Slater is a British fund manager, business writer and co-founder of Slater Investments. He is the son of the financier Jim Slater.

== Biography ==
When Mark Slater was sixteen his father gave him money to invest. He worked as a journalist for the Investors Chronicle. In 1994, with Ralph Baber, he started a fund management company, Slater Investments.

In March 2016, Slater and Steve Rawlings made a successful bid to change the management at Lakehouse, a building contractor in which they had a substantial investment.

== Recognition ==
In 2014, Slater was named "fund manager of the year" by City A.M.

In 2016 he was first on a list published by The Daily Telegraph of UK fund managers who had achieved an average return of more than 10 per cent over ten years.
