= Prisoners' Advice Service =

UK charity

- Type: NGO
- VAT ID no.: 3180659
- Registration no.: 1054495
- Location: PO Box 46199 London EC1M, UK
- Region served: England & Wales
- Revenue: charitable donations
- Website: www.prisonersadvice.org.uk

Prisoners' Advice Service (PAS) is a London-based registered charity in England and Wales that provides free, confidential legal advice and representation to prisoners regarding their rights, the application of prison rules and conditions of imprisonment.

The charity takes up prisoners' complaints about their treatment inside prison by providing free advice and taking legal action where appropriate. PAS provides assistance on an individual and confidential basis, taking legal action where appropriate.

PAS was set up in 1991 by organisations working with prisoners, including Liberty, the Howard League for Penal Reform and Nacro. Due to increasing demand for legal advice, a new charitable organisation was required to deal with the large number of requests for legal advice that they were receiving from prisoners.

The organisation runs the Prisoners' Legal Rights, which produces a quarterly bulletin entitled Prisoners' Rights. Membership includes prisoners, solicitors, barristers, academics and non-governmental organisations (NGOs).
