= The Zulu Principle =

1992 investment book

The Zulu Principle: Making Extraordinary Profits from Ordinary Shares (Zulu: Umgomo WesiZulu: Ukwenza Inzuzo Engavamile Ngamasheya Avamile) is an investment guide written by English accountant and investor Jim Slater, first published by Orion in 1992. Slater named his approach to investment when he observed that after reading a short article on the Zulu people in the Reader's Digest his wife was better informed on the subject than he himself was. He went on to consider that if his wife read all the books she could find on the subject of Zulus, coupled with a visit to South Africa to meet them for herself, then in a relatively short period of time she could become one of the leading authorities on that "clearly defined and narrow area of knowledge".

The Zulu Principle was republished in 2008 by Harriman House, with a new preface from the author.
