= Lucy Easthope =

British emergency planning expert

- Occupations: Professor-in-practice, advisor on recovery planning, author
- Known for: Emergency planning and disaster recovery

Academic background
- Education: University of Bristol (LLB); University of Leicester (MSc in Risk, Crisis and Disaster Management); Lancaster University (PhD in Medicine)
- Thesis: Technologies of recovery: plans and situated realities after disaster (2012)

Academic work
- Institutions: Durham University
- Notable works: When the Dust Settles

Lucy Easthope is a British expert and adviser on emergency planning and disaster recovery. She is a former Professor in Practice of Risk and Hazard at the University of Durham, and co-founder of the After Disaster Network at the university. She is also a visiting professor in mass fatalities and pandemics at the Centre for Death and Society at the University of Bath, a researcher at the Joint Centre for Disaster Research at Massey University, a former Senior Fellow of the Emergency Planning College, and a member of the Cabinet Office National Risk Assessment Behavioural Science Expert Group.

She is the author of When the Dust Settles: Stories of Love, Loss and Hope from an Expert in Disaster and The Recovery Myth: The Plans and Situated Realities of Post-Disaster Response.

== Biography ==
Easthope was born and raised in Liverpool, England. She began her career in disaster management and recovery at Kenyon International Emergency Services after completing a degree in law at the University of Bristol and a MSc in Risk, Crisis and Disaster Management at Leicester University.

She left work in the television industry for her job at Kenyon International, which included support for the repatriation of the remains and belongings of UK soldiers killed in the Iraq War, relocation efforts for flood survivors, and planning. She later worked for the Cambridge city council and then became a consultant for governments and businesses.

After a bidding war between eight publishers for her memoir When the Dust Settles: Stories of Love, Loss and Hope from an Expert in Disaster, the book was published by Hodder & Stoughton in March 2022.

Easthope was the guest on BBC Radio 4's Desert Island Discs in June 2025. The track she would "save from the waves" was "Tender" by Blur; her chosen luxury was a solar lamp, and her chosen book was The Diddakoi by Rumer Godden.

== When the Dust Settles ==
In 2022, Easthope published her memoir after two decades of work in disaster management, including for the September 11 attacks, the 2004 Indian Ocean earthquake and tsunami, the 7 July 2005 London bombings, the 2011 Fukushima nuclear disaster, the 2014 Malaysia Airlines Flight 17 shootdown, the 2017 Grenfell Tower fire, and the COVID-19 pandemic. It was named one of the best non-fiction books to read in 2022 by the Evening Standard and one of the best biographies of 2022 by The Telegraph.

In a review for The Times Literary Supplement, Jonathan Buckley writes, "She has worked on every major incident in the United Kingdom, and involving UK citizens abroad, since 2001. The aim of her book is to bring what she and her colleagues do "into the light", and what they do can be pretty grim." In a review for the New Statesman, Rowan Williams writes, "Easthope does a brilliant job of explaining what it is like to be a professional respondent to catastrophe, the person whose skills are sought in the wake of all kinds of mass suffering, from tsunami to terrorist attack to Grenfell Tower" and "part of the book’s importance is in its insightful exploration of what human beings need to preserve their resilience."

In a review for The Irish Times, Laura Kennedy writes, "Easthope has pioneered methods that maximise the virtues of courage, respect and dignity in scenarios where those virtues are standardly obliterated by panic and instinct. She is – sometimes literally in the context of the book, but also figuratively – the person with a comforting demeanour, a calm tone and a strong cup of tea when things are at their most bleak." According to a review by Laura Dodsworth in The Critic, "This book rewrites your perceptions of the disasters and wars of our lifetime with vivid details and vignettes. Yes, some of these are dark, but there is often humour, and the book is laced with humanity and decency."

== The Recovery Myth ==
In The Recovery Myth, Easthope proposes strategies for disaster response. In a review for the Australian Journal of Emergency Management, David King writes, "Although Easthope carried out ethnographic research, she came to the community as an experienced emergency manager and questioned many of the ideas of emergency management", and she "also draws attention to gender issues as recognition of the different roles and voices of men and women and youth. The recovery community is not homogenous."
