= Prison Reform Trust =

UK organisation

The Prison Reform Trust (PRT) was founded in 1981 in London, England, by a small group of prison reform campaigners who were unhappy with the direction in which the Howard League for Penal Reform was heading, concentrating more on community punishments than on traditional prison reform issues. Founding members included Sir Monty Finniston and Veronica Linklater.

PRT offers advice and information to thousands of people every year: prisoners, their families, prison and probation staff, the legal profession, students, academics and interested members of the public. PRT organise an annual lecture (delivered by Charles Clarke MP, Home Secretary, in 2005), and a range of conferences and seminars which attract high-profile speakers and large audiences.

The Prison Reform Trust carries out research on all aspects of prison. Recent studies include: prisoners' views on prison education, the mental health needs of women prisoners, older prisoners, prisoner councils, foreign national prisoners, prisoner votes, and a report into how sentencers make the decision to imprison offenders.

Stephen Shaw was Director of PRT from 1981 to 1999, when he became the Prisons and Probation Ombudsman for England and Wales. He was succeeded as Director by Juliet Lyon. She was succeeded as Director in 2016 by Peter Dawson. In 2023, Peter Dawson was replaced by Pia Sinha.

Sir Monty Finniston was succeeded as chair by the former Cabinet Minister, Edmund Dell, broadcaster and journalist, Jon Snow. Lord Douglas Hurd, the former Home Secretary and Foreign Secretary, succeeded Jon Snow as PRT's fourth chair in November 1997. Robert Fellowes, a crossbench peer, who has served as Private Secretary to Queen Elizabeth II, and holds a senior position at Barclays plc succeeded Douglas Hurd in September 2001. The current chair is Nick Stace, who took over from James Timpson, who had been chair since 2016, when Timpson was appointed as prisons minister in July 2024.

== See also ==
- Addaction
- Centre for Crime and Justice Studies
- Centre for Mental Health
- Centre for Social Justice
- Nacro
- Revolving Doors Agency
