= Pia Sinha =

Chief Executive of the Prison Reform Trust

- Born: 1971 or 1972 (age 54–55); India
- Citizenship: British
- Occupation: Chief executive
- Employer: Prison Reform Trust

Pia Sinha is a British criminal justice executive. Formerly a prison governor and psychologist working in prisons, she has been Chief Executive Officer of the Prison Reform Trust since April 2023. She previously held senior roles within His Majesty's Prison and Probation Service (HMPPS), including Director of Women and Acting Deputy Director of the Probation Reform Programme. She is the first Asian woman to govern a prison in the UK.

== Early life and education ==
Sinha was born in North India and emigrated to the United Kingdom at the age of 14. At least some of her childhood was spent in Bombay and she moved from the city to North Harrow. She attended North London Collegiate School before studying at City St. George's University London, where she completed a Bachelor of Science (BSc), Master of Science (MSc), and postgraduate qualification in counseling psychology. In 2016, she completed a Masters of Studies (MSt) in criminology at the University of Cambridge. Following her schooling, at university she studied psychology and economics.

== Career ==
=== Early career ===
Sinha managed a pub in Islington, London with her husband.

=== HM Prison and Probation Service ===
Sinha joined the Prison Service in 1999 as a Higher Psychologist at HMP & YOI Holloway, a younger offenders' institute and prison. She later worked as a Senior Psychologist at HMP Wandsworth and subsequently held roles including Head of Safer Prisons and Head of Reducing Re-Offending at HMP Wormwood Scrubs.

She later moved into operational management, as Deputy Governor at HMP Send, HMP Downview, and HMP Liverpool. In 2013, she was appointed Governor of HMP & YOI Thorn Cross in Cheshire, where she was the first Asian-female prison governor in the UK. Governing HMP Risley in 2016, she dealt with high levels of novel psychoactive substance abuse by prisoners. She tenured at HMP Liverpool in 2017 and oversaw efforts to address institutional challenges including drug use, rodent infestations, and other sanitation concerns.

In 2020, she moved to headquarters within HM Prison and Probation Service (HMPPS), as Acting Deputy Director of the Probation Reform Programme and later worked on the Workforce Programme. In November 2021, she was appointed Director of Women at HMPPS, where she led policy and operational work relating to women in the criminal justice system.

Also, in 2025 Sinha was appointed an advisor to the Women's Justice Board of the UK Government, which focuses on, amongst other things, reducing the number og women in person and women's reoffending.

Prison Reform Trust

In April 2023, Sinha was appointed Chief Executive Officer of the Prison Reform Trust, a UK-based charity focused on prison reform and criminal justice policy. In this role, she highlighted issues including prison overcrowding, staff shortages, sanitation, the impact of long sentences, and the growing influence of organized criminal groups within prisons. She has argued that prisons are often run in "crisis mode", with limited purposeful activity for prisoners, contributing to despair and hopelessness.

Sinha identified priorities for the organization including work on long or indeterminate sentences for public protection (IPP), leadership development programs across the justice system, probation, and policy leaders, and strengthening work on women in the justice system. She has also drawn attention to the effects of the cost of living crisis on prisoners, including rising canteen prices, low wages, and debt related violence. Sinha instated reward and recognition schemes to encourage positive behavior in prison systems.

In a 2025 interview, Sinha called for a reduction in the female prison population. She was appointed an advisor to the UK Government's Women's Justice Board, which works to reduce the number of incarcerated and recidivate women.

== Advocacy ==
Sinha campaigns for a more humane and stable criminal justice system, highlighting systemic issues of prison overcrowding, staff retention challenges, and the long-term effects of policy instability and austerity. She has argued that politically driven "tough on crime" approaches, such as long sentencing, have contributed to worsening conditions and a culture of despair within prisons.

Sinha emphasizes the importance of recognizing the human impact of incarceration, noting high levels of self-harm and hopelessness among prisoners. She stresses the role of values-driven leadership in maintaining standards of care, dignity, and procedural fairness, particularly in the face of institutional and political pressures that may de-prioritize prisoner welfare.
