= Race Engine Technology =

Technical Motorsports Magazine

Race Engine Technology is a technical motorsports magazine devoted to powertrain engineering. It is based in the United Kingdom.

== Background ==
Launched in Summer 2003 by the editor Ian Bamsey, the magazine is published 8 times a year by High Power Media and is distributed in over 50 countries around the world.

Race Engine Technology covers all forms of competition engine and transmission, including those used in Formula One, NASCAR, Le Mans, MotoGP, NHRA and World Rally Car. It includes in-depth profiles of engines used in those and many other professional motorsport categories, insights into components, interviews with key industry figures and investigation into all aspects of the engineering that goes into contemporary competition powertrains. The magazine recently published a European exclusive on the latest and last Toyota F1 V8 engine.

Race Engine Technology is published by Simon Moss and until recently had Gordon P. Blair as Technical Consultant. Professor Blair was also the author of textbooks on four and two-stroke engine technology.

== Race Engine of the Year ==
Race Engine Technology organizes the annual ‘Race Engine of the Year’ Awards, whereby around 50 practicing competition engine professionals from around the globe vote on the outstanding engines of the year. This peer-vote system acclaimed as the overall Race Engine of the Year in 2006 Audi R10 TDI turbodiesel V12, in 2007 the Toyota petrol-electric hybrid GT racer, in 2008 the Mercedes-Benz Formula One V8, in 2009 the Mercedes-Benz Formula One V8 plus KERS, and in 2010 the Renault Formula One V8.

== Other titles ==
High Power Media also publish the following special reports; F1 Race Technology, 24 Hour Race Technology, Cup Race Technology, Drag Race Technology, Motorcycle Race Technology and Rally Race Technology.

== RET-Monitor ==
High Power Media launched an online technical content site in 2009 that contains free articles on many race engine components. The RET-Monitor content is provided to expand the knowledge of race engine builders worldwide through the Internet.
