= Stephen Shaw (ombudsman) =

Stephen Shaw, CBE (born 26 March 1953) is the former Prisons and Probation Ombudsman for England and Wales. He was first appointed Prisons Ombudsman in October 1999; from 1 September 2001 his remit was extended to take in complaints against the National Probation Service (NPS) from those under supervision in the community. His remit was further extended to take in complaints from those in immigration detention in October 2006. He departed in April 2010.

Shaw’s time in office as ombudsman covered a period in which the role’s responsibilities and independence increased. In 2003, Alan Travis noted in UK newspaper The Guardian, "His predecessor, Vice-Admiral Sir Peter Woodhead, had his powers so clipped by the former Conservative home secretary, Michael Howard, that the small and little-known club that is the British and Irish Ombudsmen Association refused him membership on the grounds that he was not independent enough".

In 2003-04, Shaw personally led the investigations into a number of deaths in prisons in England, the first time such deaths had been investigated independently. From 1 April 2004 the Ombudsman’s office has been responsible for the investigation of all deaths in prisons and immigration removal centres, as well as the deaths of residents of NPS hostels (approved premises). Shaw’s office conducted around 200 such investigations each year. The office also has a discretionary power to investigate post-release deaths.

In 2009, Shaw chaired two public inquiries into serious self-harm incidents that have not resulted in death (he stepped down from the second of these in June). These "near deaths" may also invoke the investigative obligation under Article 2 of the European Convention on Human Rights.

As Ombudsman, Shaw conducted a range of other investigations including the major inquiry into the fire and disturbance that occurred at Yarl's Wood Immigration Removal Centre in February 2002. He also served as one of two independent members of the Parole Board’s review committee that considers the cases of released prisoners who have committed serious further offences.

In February 2015, the Home Office announced that Shaw would be conducting "an independent review of policies and procedures affecting the welfare of those held in immigration removal centres", with Home Secretary Theresa May citing Shaw’s "wealth of relevant experience".

Prior to becoming Prisons Ombudsman, Shaw was director of the Prison Reform Trust charity for eighteen years.
