= Howard League for Penal Reform =

UK charity

- Founded: 1866
- Type: Charitable organisation
- Registration no.: England and Wales: 251926
- Legal status: Registered charity
- Purpose: Prison reform, criminal justice
- Location: 75–77 St John Street, London, EC1M 4NN
- Origins: Founded in 1866 as the Howard Association
- Region served: England and Wales
- Website: howardleague.org
- Formerly called: The Howard Association (1866–1921); Penal Reform League (1907–1921)

The Howard League for Penal Reform is a registered charity in the United Kingdom. It is the oldest penal reform organisation in the world, named after John Howard. It was founded as the Howard Association in 1866 and changed its name in 1921, following a merger with the Penal Reform League. The charity focuses on penal reform in England and Wales.

The Howard League is independent of the United Kingdom government and is funded by voluntary donations and membership donations. The charity also receives funding from the Legal Services Commission, as it holds Legal Aid contracts in order to perform its work with young people in custody.

The Howard League Centre for Penal Reform, the charity's headquarters from 2000 to 2024, was officially opened by Betty Boothroyd in November 2001.

== History ==
In 1921, the Howard Association merged with the Penal Reform League to become the Howard League for Penal Reform. The Penal Reform League had been founded in 1907 with Arthur St. John as Secretary. The new organisation was led by Margery Fry, who had been Secretary of the Penal Reform League since 1918. Fry was succeeded by Cicely Craven as honorary secretary of the Howard League in 1926.

The Howard League played a key role in campaigning for the abolition of capital punishment; advocated for the founding of the National Probation Service; and co-founded the Prisoners' Advice Service. The charity also successfully campaigned for the introduction of the victims' compensation scheme.

Historically-related organisations operate in a number of other commonwealth countries including the John Howard Society of Canada and the New Zealand Howard League of which the Howard League for Penal Reform Canterbury is a part.

In October 2021, Andrea Coomber, previously director of JUSTICE, succeeded Frances Crook as Chief Executive of the Howard League.

=== Child arrests ===
The Howard League campaigns for a reduction in the number of arrests of children in England and Wales.

Data published by the charity in 2016 showed that the number of arrests of children had fallen by 59 per cent in six years (from 245,763 in 2010 to 101,926 in 2015). The Howard League's Chief Executive, Frances Crook, said that the fall could be attributed to better use of resources, removing national targets, improving staff training, and support from communities.

=== Books For Prisoners ===
The Howard League's Books For Prisoners campaign was set up in 2014 to overturn restrictions on sending books to people in prisons in England and Wales.

The campaign was supported by another charity, English PEN, and writers including Carol Ann Duffy, the Poet Laureate of the United Kingdom; Mark Haddon; Sarah Waters; David Hare; A. L. Kennedy; Alan Bennett; Salman Rushdie; Joanne Harris; Ian Rankin; Irvine Welsh; Nick Hornby; Ruth Padel and Philip Pullman.

The campaign was successful. In December 2014, High Court judge Mr Justice Collins ruled that there was "no good reason" to restrict access to books for prisoners.

=== Criminal Courts Charge ===
The Howard League campaigned against the criminal courts charge, which required defendants who were convicted of a crime to pay fees ranging from £150 to £1,200 towards the cost of their case.

When the charge was suspended by the then Justice Secretary Michael Gove in December 2015, Howard League Chief Executive Frances Crook called the decision a "victory for justice".

== Legal work ==
The Howard League has a legal team that helps children and young people in the criminal justice system. It provides a free and confidential advice line for prisoners under the age of 21.

The legal team also brings cases and conducts participation work to help shape the law and empower children to use their rights.

== Community Awards ==
The Howard League ran an annual Community Awards competition to recognise successful community projects that encourage desistance from crime, which culminated in 2022.

== See also ==
- Centre for Crime and Justice Studies
- Centre for Mental Health
- Nacro
- Prison Reform Trust
- Revolving Doors Agency
- Timeline of children's rights in the United Kingdom
- We Are With You (formerly Addaction)
