= Maurice Sedwell =

British Bespoke Tailor

Coordinates: 51.51076°N 0.14009°W

Maurice Sedwell is a British clothing company established by Maurice Sedwell in 1938 and first located on Fleet Street in London. The company moved to 9 Savile Row in 1963, In 1988, the company was purchased from the retiring Maurice Sedwell by Andrew Ramroop, a long-standing employee.

Andrew Ramroop arrived in the UK from Trinidad in 1970. Ramroop has been the sole owner of Maurice Sedwell for over 30 years. The business thrived in the 1980s and 1990s with a client list that included Lords, politicians, and even a member of the royal family. Under Ramroop's direction, Maurice Sedwell moved to a larger space at 19 Savile Row in 1994, and in 2022 moved again to 9-10 Savile Row.

In 2008, Ramroop opened The Savile Row Academy, the only professionally staffed school on Savile Row.

Ramroop appeared on Desert Island Discs in 2022.
