= Secondary banking crisis of 1973–1975 =

British financial crisis

The secondary banking crisis of 1973–1975 was a dramatic crash in British property prices that caused dozens of small ("secondary") lending banks to be threatened with bankruptcy.

== Crisis ==
The secondary banks, like the larger institutions, had been lending heavily based on the previously rising housing prices of the late 1960s and early 1970s, borrowing excessively in relation to the collateral assets. A sudden downturn in house prices and increases in interest rates well before the November 1973 oil crisis left the smaller institutions holding many loans secured by property with lower value than the loans. The Bank of England, led by Jasper Hollom, conducted negotiations resulting in bail-outs of around 30 of the smaller banks and intervened to assist some 30 others. While all of the banks were left able to pay depositors, the Bank of England lost an estimated £100 million. The downturn was exacerbated by the global 1973–74 stock market crash, which hit the UK while it was already in the midst of the housing price crash.

== Recovery ==
On 19 December 1974, a rent freeze by the Edward Heath government which had lasted since 1971 was ended, and the Bank of England, which had severely restricted the supply of credit for housing in 1971, released more funds. While housing prices and lending recovered in 1975, inflation continued to rise, leading to greater economic, labour and political problems for Britain.

The Bank of England's regulatory powers over lenders were increased in the Banking Act 1979 to try to prevent a repeat of the crisis.

== Causes ==
The causes remain a source of debate. Some blame the lax regulation of lenders and policy-driven inflationary pressures (the 'Barber Boom', named after Chancellor of the Exchequer Anthony Barber), which failed in its target of lowering the high unemployment rate. A sudden tightening of credit (interest rates were raised to 13% in October 1973) was laid at the feet of the Bank of England.

Others blame the Heath government's fixing of rent price rises in 1971. The only book-length study of the crisis by Reid (1982) blames all those factors but also a bubble of housing prices that saw a 50% increase in London real estate prices over 1971 and the financial uncertainty caused by the end of the Bretton Woods agreement and the inconclusive elections of February 1974. The period was also marked by a series of crises, including the political uncertainty of the Heath government, waves of public sector and industrial strikes and oil shortages that led to a government-mandated three-day work week. However, Reid also blames the entire market culture of the London banking institutions from the late 1960s, which she considers made market speculation (and consequent crashes) inevitable.

== See also ==
- Economic history of Britain. 1960–1979: the Sixties and Seventies
- Political history of the United Kingdom (1945–present)
- Stock market crash of 1973–1974
- October 1974 United Kingdom general election
- Harold Wilson
