= Asset stripping =

Selling assets for the sake of equity investors

Asset stripping is the selling off of a company's assets to improve returns for equity investors, often a financial investor, a "corporate raider", who takes over another company and then auctions off the acquired company's assets. The term is generally used in a pejorative sense as such activity is not considered helpful to the company.

The proceeds of the sale of assets may be used to lower the company's net debt. Alternatively, they may be used to pay a dividend to equityholders, leaving the company with lower net worth – i.e., the same level of debt but fewer assets (and weaker earnings) to support that debt. With a lower level of assets, some argue that the business is rendered less financially stable or viable. For example, the sale-and-leaseback of a building would lead to an increased rental bill for the company.

Asset stripping is a highly controversial topic within the financial world. The benefits of asset stripping generally go to the corporate raiders, who can slash the debts they may have whilst improving their net worth. However, since asset stripping often results in thousands of employees losing their jobs without much consideration of the consequences to the affected community, the concept can be unpopular in the public sphere. One particular example in which asset stripping cost a significant number of workers their jobs was the Fontainebleau Las Vegas LLC case. After the takeover, 433 people lost their jobs when assets were sold off and the company was stripped.

Asset stripping has been considered to be a problem in economies such the United Kingdom and the United States, which have highly financialized economies. In these situations, finance capital focuses on shareholder returns, including at the expense of the viability of bought out companies.

== History ==
Early innovators of asset stripping were Carl Icahn, Victor Posner, and Nelson Peltz, all of whom were investors in the 1970s and 1980s. Carl Icahn performed one of the most notorious and hostile takeovers when he acquired Trans World Airlines in 1985. Icahn stripped TWA of its assets, selling them individually to repay the debt assimilated during the takeover. This particular corporate raid formed the idea of selling a company's assets in order to repay debt and eventually increase the raider's net worth.

One of the biggest corporate raids that failed to materialize was the takeover of Gulf Oil by T. Boone Pickens. In 1984, Pickens attempted to acquire Gulf Oil and sell its assets individually to gain net worth. However, the purchase would have had been severely detrimental to Chevron, a customer of Gulf Oil. Therefore, Chevron stepped in and merged with Gulf Oil for $13.2 billion, which at that time was the biggest merger between two companies.

In 2011, BC Partners acquired Phones 4u for a fee in the region of £700 million. At this point in time Phones 4u had already entered administration and had deep financial struggles. However, this did not prevent BC Partners from taking a £223 million dividend in order to pay off some of its own debts. Under the ownership of BC Partners, Phones 4u had very little financial freedom to expand and claim back the contract of EE. In September 2014 O2, Vodafone and Three decided to withdraw the rights for Phones 4u to sell their products. Due to the already poor financial situation of Phones 4u, the company had no alternative but to sell its individual assets and close down. The net worth of Phones 4u's assets, estimated to exceed £1.4 billion, provided BC Partners with the credit to pay off some of its debts and significantly improve its net worth.

== In the United Kingdom ==
The process of asset stripping is not inherently an illegal practice. If a corporate raider sells the target company's assets individually and pays off its debts, the financial regulators have no room for investigation. However, some firms perform the process illegally and if found guilty may incur a substantial fine or even prison.

Asset stripping by private equity firms in Europe is now regulated pursuant to the Alternative Investment Fund Managers Directive.

=== Phoenixing ===
This is one of two methods a corporate raider can use to strip assets illegally. For this method to work, the corporate raider and the targeted firm must have the same director. Assets of the targeted firm are transferred to the corporate raider to ensure they remain safe from debt collectors. This process lets the corporate raider improve their net worth while leaving liabilities with the targeted company.

=== Liquidation ===
This method acts on completely fraudulent terms, and results in a higher punishment from the Financial Conduct Authority (FCA). Here, corporate raiders take ownership of a company on hostile terms, transfer the assets to their name, and then put the dilapidated firm into liquidation. This ensures that the corporate raider improves their net worth, and has no liability to deal with the firm recently placed into liquidation.

== See also ==
- Corporate raid
- Junk bond
- Leveraged buyout
- Tunneling (fraud)
- Vulture fund
