= National Mental Health Development Unit =

Formal government organisation in England

The National Mental Health Development Unit (NMHDU) was a governmental organisation in England charged with supporting the implementation of mental health policy. The unit worked to achieve this by advising on best practice for improving mental health and mental health services. NMHDU closed on 31 March 2011.

The NMHDU was funded by the Department of Health and the National Health Service, and aimed to work in partnership with the NHS's strategic health authorities and all stakeholders. The unit was launched in 2009, following the abolition of the National Institute for Mental Health in England (NIMHE). The director of the NIMHE, Ian MacPherson, became the director of the NMHDU.

The Unit had several specific programmes of activity, including to support the Improving Access to Psychological Therapies (IAPT) scheme. The Unit also supported the government's strategy for mental health, New Horizons, which was published in December 2009 following the end of the National Service Framework plans.

== See also ==
- Centre for Mental Health
- Child and Adolescent Mental Health Services
- Mental Health Foundation
- Mental Health Providers' Forum
- Mind
- Nacro
- Rethink Mental Illness
- Richmond Fellowship
- Revolving Doors Agency
- SANE
- Stand to Reason (charity)
- Together: Working for Well-being
- Turning Point
