= SANE (charity) =

UK mental health charity

- Formation: 1986
- Headquarters: London, England, United Kingdom
- Founder: Marjorie Wallace CBE
- Website: http://www.sane.org.uk/

SANE is a UK mental health charity working to improve quality of life for people affected by mental illness.

== History ==
SANE was established in 1986 to improve the quality of life for people affected by mental illness, following the overwhelming public response to a series of articles published in The Times entitled "The Forgotten Illness". Written by the charity's founder and Chief Executive, Marjorie Wallace, the articles exposed the neglect of people suffering from mental illness and the poverty of services and information for individuals and families. From its initial focus on schizophrenia (the name started as an acronym for "Schizophrenia: A National Emergency"), SANE expanded and is now concerned with all mental illnesses.

During the COVID-19 pandemic lockdowns, SANE's hotline received a 200% increase in calls.

== See also ==
- Centre for Mental Health
- Improving Access to Psychological Therapies
- Mental Health Foundation
- Mental Health Providers' Forum
- Mind
- Nacro
- Rethink Mental Illness
- Richmond Fellowship
- Revolving Doors Agency
- Stand to Reason (charity)
- Together
- Turning Point

General:

- Mental health in the United Kingdom
