= Stand to Reason (UK charity) =

British mental health charity

Stand to Reason is a UK-based mental health charity which aims to raise the profile of people who are mentally ill, fight prejudice, establish rights and achieve equality.

It is run by former corporate financier Jonathan Naess.

== Activities ==
Stand to Reason has a panel of volunteers from many walks of life who are open to talking about their own mental health experiences and recovery to be stronger than before and to create a greater impact on the world. These volunteers speak at conferences, awareness events and respond to media enquiries about mental health in the workplace.

Stand to Reason also helps to reduce stigma surrounding mental health by providing a variety of services to organisations including:

- training line managers and HR teams in understanding, spotting and handling mental health in their teams
- establishing peer support networks both within and across employers
- offering public peer support workshops to help people stay at (or get back to) work following a mental health problem.

== See also ==
- Centre for Mental Health
- Improving Access to Psychological Therapies
- Mental Health Foundation
- Mental Health Providers' Forum
- Mind
- Rethink Mental Illness
- Richmond Fellowship
- Revolving Doors Agency
- SANE
- Together
- Turning Point

General:

- Mental health in the United Kingdom
