= Together for Mental Wellbeing =

UK charity

Together for Mental Wellbeing is a UK charity working in mental health. Until 2005 it was known as the Mental After Care Association (Maca).

== Description ==
Together is the United Kingdom's oldest mental health charity working to support people with mental health needs. It supported more than 9,000 people who experienced mental distress in 2019, through 70 different projects across the country made up of four different types of services including residential accommodation, community support, advocacy services and supporting people experiencing mental distress in criminal justice settings.

Together is led by a senior leadership team and board of trustees. The Chief Executive is Linda Bryant, a registered Forensic Psychologist who was previously a frontline Forensic Mental Health Practitioner within Together. The charity also has a core principle of "Service User Leadership" which they define as empowering people to make choices that affect their lives, lead their journey to wellbeing on their own terms and to collectively influence and improve services, organisations and society.

Together works with people of all ages from 18 upwards. Many of them have been diagnosed with severe and enduring mental health needs such as schizophrenia or severe depression. The charity provides mental health services by working in partnership with many other organisations, including housing associations, health trusts, local authorities, criminal justice agencies, and private and other voluntary sector bodies.

The charity changed its name in 2005 from the Mental After Care Association. Key to the change was the incorporation of wellbeing, now a foundational concept in the charity's work.

== History ==
Together was founded in 1879 by Rev Henry Hawkins, then chaplain of Colney Hatch asylum, who wanted to find ways to support people leaving the institution once they returned to the community.

== Funding ==
Together's income and financial records can be found in the annual accounts which are published at https://www.together-uk.org/about-us/our-funding/. The vast majority of funding is from governmental health and social care agencies, mainly for its supported housing projects.

== See also ==
- Centre for Mental Health
- Improving Access to Psychological Therapies
- Mental Health Foundation
- Mental Health Providers' Forum
- Mind
- Nacro
- Rethink Mental Illness
- Richmond Fellowship
- Revolving Doors Agency
- Stand to Reason (charity)
- Turning Point
