= Centre for Mental Health =

Independent mental health charity

- Formation: 1985
- Headquarters: London
- Region served: England and Wales
- Website: www.centreformentalhealth.org.uk

The Centre for Mental Health is an independent mental health charity in the United Kingdom. It aims to inspire hope, opportunity and a fair chance in life for people of all ages with or at risk of mental ill health. The centre acts as a bridge between the worlds of research, policy and service provision and believes strongly in the importance of high-quality evidence and analysis. It encourages innovation and advocates for change in policy and practice through focused research, development and training.

== Focus ==
- Criminal justice - the centre identifies effective methods of supporting and diverting people with mental health problems in the criminal justice system
- Employment - the centre develops and promotes new ways of helping people with mental health problems get and keep work
- Recovery - the centre helps mental health services across the UK to support people more effectively to make their own lives better on their own terms
- Children - the centre undertakes work which aims to improve the life chances of children through the support they need early in life
- Mental and Physical Health - the centre recognises the strong association between mental and physical ill health and works with partners to review the evidence on cost of co-morbidities, as well as carrying out related research on liaison psychiatry
- Workplace training - we train managers and staff to understand, identify and support people with depression and anxiety at work

== History ==
The Centre for Mental Health began in March 1985 as the National Unit for Psychiatric Research and Development (NUPRD). It was founded by the Gatsby Charitable Foundation, an independent grant-making trust set up by Lord Sainsbury of Turville to 'advance education and learning in the science and practise of mental health care, to promote research into mental health and publish the useful results and to assist the provision of mental health care for those in need of it'. The aim was for NUPRD to tackle these issues by working in a different way to other organisations. NUPRD was initially staffed by a small group of people working in an office at Lewisham Hospital. After 1989, it was renamed the Research and Development for Psychiatry (RDP), moving into the current offices on Borough High Street.

RDP eventually became the 'Sainsbury Centre for Mental Health' in February 1992. It was at the centre of developing and helping to implement the National Service Framework for Mental Health, and in 1995, evaluated the Blackthorn Trust garden (in Maidstone, Kent) and its therapies for two years.

From 2006, the centre changed its work to focus on mental health and employment, in which it already had an established programme, as well as a new area of work on mental health and the criminal justice system. A new look and logo were subsequently introduced in 2007 to accompany this change in focus.

The Gatsby Charitable Foundation, one of the Sainsbury family's charitable trusts, provided the centre's core funding each year from 1985 until 2009, when it announced that it would begin to spend out its funds, its annual grant to the centre ceasing the following year. A final grant covering three years was then announced by the foundation in the summer of 2010. The charity has since been known as the Centre for Mental Health.

== See also ==
- Mental Health Foundation
- Mental Health Providers' Forum
- Mind
- Nacro
- Rethink Mental Illness
- Richmond Fellowship
- Revolving Doors Agency
- SANE
- Stand to Reason (charity)
- Together
- Turning Point
