= Mind (charity) =

British mental health charity

- The current logo, in use since 2021
- Formation: 1946
- Headquarters: Stratford, London
- Region served: England and Wales
- President: Stephen Fry
- Website: mind.org.uk

Mind is a mental health charity in England and Wales. It was founded in 1946 as the National Association for Mental Health (NAMH).

Mind offers information and advice to people with mental health problems and lobbies government and local authorities on their behalf. It also works to raise public awareness and understanding of issues relating to mental health. Since 1982, it has awarded an annual prize for "Book of the Year" having to do with mental health, in addition to three other prizes. Since 2008 Mind has hosted the annual Mind Media Awards, celebrating the best portrayals and reporting of mental health across the media.

Around 125 local Mind associations (independent, affiliated charities) provide services such as supported housing, floating support schemes, care homes, drop-in centres and self-help support groups. They are each governed by their own board of trustees and raise their own funds to deliver services, including commonly through providing services on behalf of local authorities.

== History ==
In 1946, Mind was founded under its original name as the National Association for Mental Health (NAMH) from three voluntary organisations that provided services for the "maladjusted, emotionally disturbed or mentally handicapped to any degree".

The National Association for Mental Health was formed (initially as national Council) by the merging of the following three organisations toward the end of the second world war:

- Central Association for Mental Welfare (CAMW)
- National Council for Mental Hygiene (NCMH)
- Child Guidance Council (CGC)

From 1946 to 1951, the first director was Ms M. C. Owen.

From 1947 to 1951, the medical director was Dr Alfred Torrie.

In 1951, both roles (director and medical director) were combined for Mary Applebey.

The NCMH had been an organisation of psychiatrists and psychologists, while the CAMW comprised representatives of various voluntary bodies. Among other things, they helped run and monitor institutions for the mentally handicapped, and developed training for mental health professionals. They were both part of the social hygiene movement, and had advocated eugenics and sterilisation as a means of dealing with those considered too mentally deficient to be assisted into healthy productive work and contented family life.

The beginnings of the National Association for Mental Health also coincided with the development of the National Health Service and the welfare state.

In 1969, numerous Scientologists joined the NAMH and attempted to ratify as official policy a number of points concerning the treatment of psychiatric patients. When their identity was exposed they were expelled from the organisation en masse. The Church of Scientology in 1971 unsuccessfully sued the NAMH over the matter in the High Court. The case was resisted by Appleby and the NCMH, and the case became notable in British charity law.

=== The MIND Campaign (1970) ===
In 1970, Michael Murphy, an advertising executive living with alcohol addiction and mental health challenges, approached Mary Applebey at NAMH to propose a campaign called MIND as "a marketing broad scale attack on prejudice against victims of mental illness".

On 16 February 1971, the MIND Campaign and Manifesto was launched under the direction of The Right Hon David Ennals, PC.

=== 1970s ===
During the 1970s, the NCMH became involved with the debate raised by Ann Shearer that mental hospitals should be shut. Shearer, a Guardian journalist, was joined by Anita Hunt of the Spastics Society and an architect named Sandra Franklin to create the Campaign for the Mentally Handicapped (CMH). They estimated that there were 8,000 mentally handicapped children in hospitals, and they and parent groups wanted this to end. They lobbied the NCMH but Appleby resisted their central objective, although they offered support in other areas. Appleby wanted to avoid the hospital-v.-community debate, but she saw the hospital as a focus with mental handicap able to attract separate government funding.

=== 1990s ===
Since 1992, when it was first observed, Mind has celebrated World Mental Health Day, which occurs annually on 10 October.

=== 2000s ===
In 2006, Paul Farmer became chief executive of Mind, moving from his position as director of public affairs at the charity Rethink. He is due to leave this post in October 2022.

In 2008, the charity Mental Health Media (formerly the Mental Health Film Council founded in 1963 following a Mind initiative) was merged into Mind, shutting down its Open Up service which had sought to empower mental health service users to speak up in their communities, and bringing with it control over its Mental Health Media Awards.

=== 2010s ===
In the early-to-mid 2010s, Matt Wilkinson, a British radio presenter, hosted interview podcasts with guests who described their mental health experiences and issues related to those experiences.

In 2011, Stephen Fry succeeded Melvyn Bragg as President of Mind.

== Campaigns ==
In addition to its other activities, Mind campaigns for the rights of people who have experience of mental distress. Mind's current campaigns include:

- Taking care of business — tackling workplace stress, this campaign, launched May 2010, aims to make workplaces more mentally healthy.
- Another assault — exposing the high levels of victimisation and harassment experienced by people with mental health problems, and their reluctance to report abuse to the police.
- In the red: debt, poverty and mental health— exploring the impact debt has on mental health.
- Our lives, our choices— Mind is part of the national campaign for independent living. The campaign calls for an overhaul of the health and social care system.

In addition, Mind is part of the Time to Change coalition, along with Rethink. Time to Change is an England-wide campaign to end mental health discrimination.

Mind campaigns for the inclusion and involvement of (ex)users of mental health services. In its own organisation, at least two service users must be on the executive committee of each local Mind group. The charity operates Mind Link, a national network of service users, which is represented on Mind's Council of Management, its ultimate decision-making body.

For many years Mind has celebrated published fiction or non-fiction writing by or about people with emotional or mental distress with the annual Mind Book of the Year Award.

Since 2008 Mind took over control of the annual Mental Health Media Awards, which it renamed the Mind Media Awards. This is intended to "recognise and celebrate the best portrayals of mental distress, and reporting of mental health, in the media". However, the operational running of the Awards ceremony and the selection of judges is carried out by private company Keystone Conference & Events Management Ltd.

Within the complex debate on mental illness causality, Mind has developed a list of factors which in its view may trigger mental illness episodes.

Mind is involved in a campaign Rethink Mental Illness to reduce the stigma associated with psychiatric illness.

== Funding ==
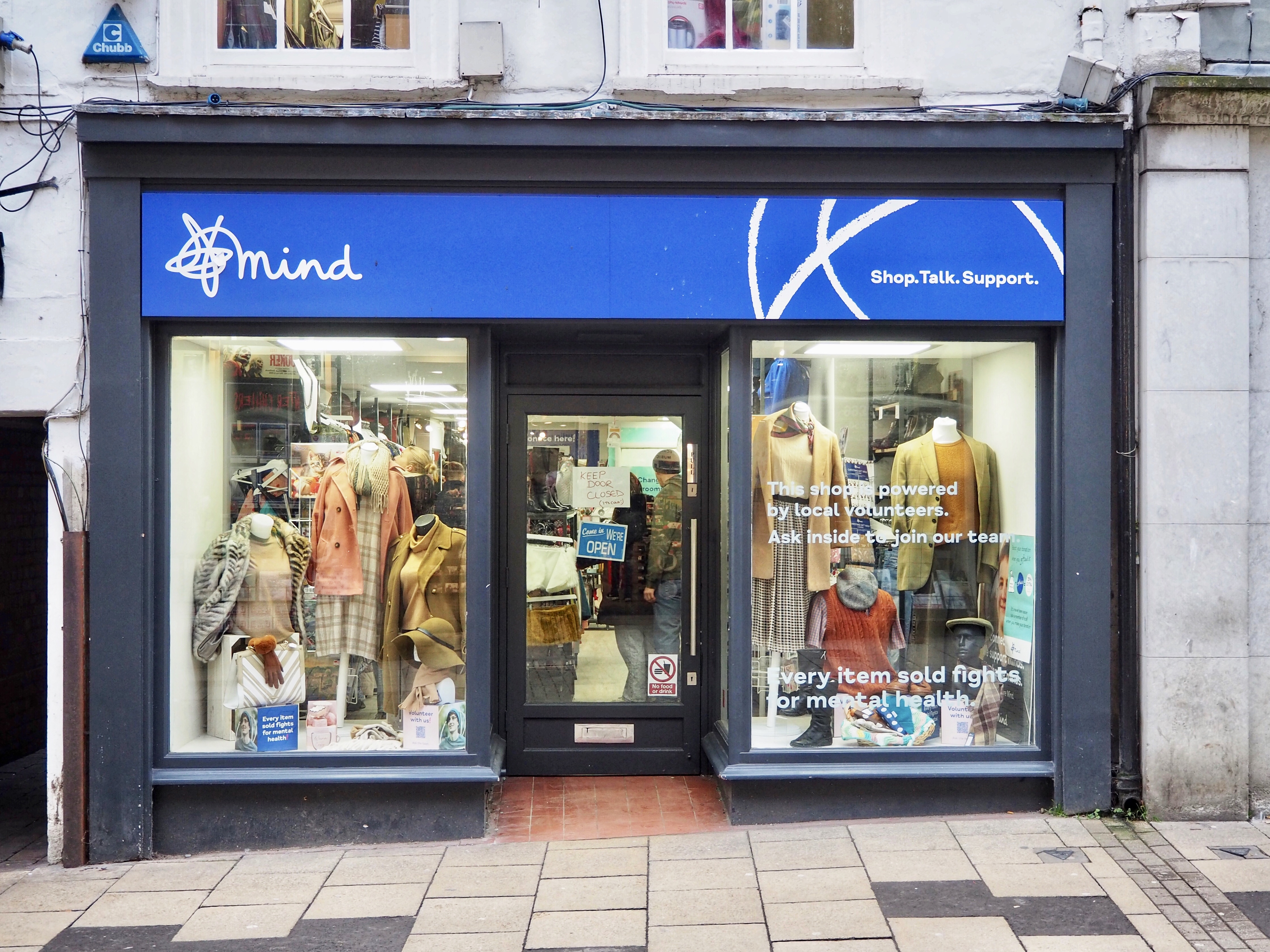
A Mind charity shop in York

National Mind takes donations, sponsorship, grants and operates charity shops across England and Wales. Each local Mind association is an independent charity responsible for its own funding, although they are provided some project funds from national Mind. The total gross income of the local associations in 2009 was £87 million which, combined with the national Mind income of £25 million, gave a total of £112 million. At least some local associations report that the majority of their income is from the British government through local governmental and NHS grants (e.g. 74%).

Mind’s national accounts for the financial year ending in March 2021 showed the charity’s total income was £58 million and expenditure was £60 million.

Mind states that, while it accepts corporate support in general, it does not accept any money from pharmaceutical companies. This policy is binding on all local Minds who are not permitted to accept sponsorship or donations from pharmaceutical companies for their own events, or for fees or expenses for attending conferences.

== Partnerships ==
In July 2015, Mind collaborated with McDonald's to fundraise money. The restaurant chain gave away Mind toys in Happy Meals to raise awareness and gave 50 percent of its profits to Mind.

== See also ==
- Centre for Mental Health
- Improving Access to Psychological Therapies
- Mental Health Foundation
- Mental health in the United Kingdom
- Mental Health Providers' Forum
- Nacro
- Rethink Mental Illness
- Revolving Doors Agency
- Richmond Fellowship
- SANE
- Stand to Reason (charity)
- Suicide in the United Kingdom
- Together for Mental Wellbeing
- Turning Point
