= Alliance Homes Group =

Housing association in England

- Formation: 2006
- Type: Housing association

Alliance Homes Group is a social enterprise and housing association based in the West of England. Established in 2006 following the transfer of approximately 6,700 homes from North Somerset Council, the Group manages around 6,500–6,800 properties and employs roughly 400 staff, with an annual turnover near £38 million .

Its services span affordable housing management, domiciliary care, support for vulnerable populations, property maintenance, and sustainable energy initiatives—including solar photovoltaic installations on approximately 1,700 homes . Since its inception, the Group has expanded into community support, energy efficiency, and development of extra-care housing, including a £10 million scheme for over‑55s in Worle, North Somerset

== History ==
On 6 February 2006 North Somerset Housing was born out of a stock transfer from North Somerset Council. Around 6,700 properties were transferred, representing over 77 per cent of social housing in the district.

In 2008 North Somerset Housing becomes nshousing.

In 2009 Westonworks opens to provide information and advice on training courses, volunteering opportunities, self-employment and work experience.

In 2011 nshousing rebrands to become Alliance Homes. Alliance Homes is formally recognized and accredited as a social enterprise

Harbour Court offices are opened in Portishead and repairs and maintenance services are brought in house with the launch of Alliance Homes Property Care.

In 2012 The Carbon Savings Alliance is launched, led by Alliance Homes, the Alliance is made up of 30 landlords whose focus is to deliver energy efficient schemes to tenants.

In 2013 The Support Alliance and Older Person's Support Alliance are established as Alliance Living leads a range of partners to deliver support services across North Somerset.

In 2014 Alliance Living links up with Crossroads Care, Age UK and North Somerset Community Partnership to lead the Crossroads Alliance and provide support to unpaid carers to help them carry on caring for their loved ones.

In 2015 Alliance develops its first homes outside North Somerset.

In 2016 Group CEO Clive Bodley, who had successfully led the Group since its creation retires and Louise Swain is appointed as Group CEO.

In 2017 following the closure of Carers Trust Phoenix 50 staff transferred to Alliance Living and Alliance took on their Adult Carers Support Service, Young Carers Support Service and Counselling Service for Carers.

== Overview ==
Alliance Homes Group is a housing association operating in the West of England and were established in 2006 to manage homes which were transferred from North Somerset Council.

Alliance Homes currently own and manage around 6,500 homes and employ 400 staff, have an annual turnover of £38 million and work in partnership with local, regional and national agencies to deliver services. As well as providing homes that are affordable in terms of rent and running costs, they also provide a range of care and support services to help individuals.

Alliance Homes have been shortlisted for an award by a local student association for their community building initiative. It also won an award for its affordable green energy commitment.

Alliance Homes have built a new £10 million development of 65 self-contained apartments for people over 55 in Worle, North Somerset.

== Services / Brands ==
Alliance Homes Group - is a registered society and social enterprise operating across the West of England.

Alliance Homes - manages 6,800 homes. It also delivers a range of projects to build communities.

Alliance Living Support - is a support provision for vulnerable people who deliver services across North Somerset.

Alliance Living Care - promotes independent living by providing domiciliary care services, as a local authority partner and direct to the public.

Alliance Property Care - specialises in asset management, development, repairs and investment.

Alliance Ventures - deliver environmentally friendly initiatives. It includes ownership of solar photo-voltaic panels installed on 1,700 properties and is a significant energy generator.

== Partnerships ==
Alliance Homes Group collaborates with various partners, including:

The Older Persons Support Alliance: Age UK (Somerset), Rethink Mental Illness, North Somerset Community Partnership.

The Support Alliance: Second Step, Richmond Fellowship, Freeways, Elim Housing, Voluntary Action North Somerset.

The Carers Support Alliance: Alliance Living Support, Age UK Somerset, North Somerset Community Partnership.
