= Blackthorn (disambiguation) =

Blackthorn or sloe is Prunus spinosa, a species of Prunus native to Europe, western Asia, and locally in northwest Africa.

Other plant species also named 'blackthorn' are:

- Australian blackthorn (Bursaria spinosa), a small shrub in the family Pittosporaceae
- Blackthorn or black-thorn acacia (Senegalia mellifera) of the Afrotropics and Arabia

Blackthorn may also refer to:

- Blackthorn (American band), an American Celtic rock band
- Blackthorn (character), character in Marvel Comics
- Blackthorn (film), a 2011 Western film directed by Spanish director Mateo Gil
- Blackthorn (musician), Norwegian metal musician
- Blackthorn (Russian band), a Russian symphonic extreme metal band
- Blackthorn, Oxfordshire, England
  - Blackthorn railway station, Oxfordshire, England
- Blackthorn Cider, a processed commercial cider
- Blackthorn Trust, a British charity
- Lord Blackthorn, a recurring character in the Ultima game series
- USCGC Blackthorn (WLB-291), a United States Coast Guard ship
- Blackthorn City, a town in the Pokémon games universe; see Pokémon Gold and Silver § Setting
- A British tag game from the 19th century; see British Bulldog (game) § Blackthorn
- Blackthorn (cocktail)

== See also ==
- Black Thorn (disambiguation)
- Blackthorne (disambiguation)
