= Rethink Mental Illness =

British mental health charity

- Founded: 1972
- Type: Charity
- Registration no.: 271028
- Purpose: Mental illness
- Headquarters: The Dumont; 28 Albert Embankment; London; SE1 7GR
- Region served: UK
- Key people: Chief Executive Mark Winstanley
- Website: Official website
- Remarks: No matter how bad things are, we can help people severely affected by mental illness improve their lives.
- Formerly called: National Schizophrenia Fellowship; Rethink

Rethink Mental Illness is an English charity that seeks to improve the lives of people severely affected by mental illness.

The organisation was founded in 1972 by John Pringle whose son was diagnosed with schizophrenia. The operating name of 'Rethink' was adopted in 2002, and expanded to 'Rethink' Mental Illness' (to be more self-explanatory) in 2011, but the charity registered as the National Schizophrenia Fellowship, although no longer focusing only on schizophrenia. It is now registered as Rethink Mental Illness.

Rethink Mental Illness is for carers as well as for people living with a mental illness. It now has approximately 1,300 members, who receive a regular magazine called Your Voice. In 2023/24, the charity helped 24,000 people in their services, 31,000 people called their helpline and 825,000 people followed them on social media. It provides services (including supported housing projects, advocacy and crisis support), peer support groups, and information through an advice helpline and publications. The Rethink Mental Illness website receives almost 5 million visitors every year. Rethink Mental Illness carries out some survey research which informs both their own and national mental health policy, and it actively campaigns against stigma and for change through greater awareness and understanding. It is a member organisation of EUFAMI, the European Federation of Families of People with Mental Illness.

== History ==
John Pringle published an anonymous article in The Times on 9 May 1970, describing the ways that his son's schizophrenia diagnosis had affected his family, and what his experience caring for his son was like. This article and the support it gathered was the starting point for the National Schizophrenia Fellowship, which was founded by Pringle in 1972.

In its early days, the National Schizophrenia Fellowship acted as a support group and charity for individuals caring for loved ones diagnosed with schizophrenia. The organization was more robust than previous charities and support organizations, because of its emphasis on helping its constituents understand more about mental health, seek out community for people affected by schizophrenia, and look after their own mental health while caring for loved ones affected by mental illness.

The National Schizophrenia Fellowship was instrumental in promoting the new early psychosis paradigm in 1995 when it linked with an early psychosis network in the West Midlands, called IRIS (Initiative to reduce impact of schizophrenia). This then led to the Early Psychosis Declaration by the World Health Organization and the subsequent formation of early psychosis services as part of mainstream health policy.

In 2002, the organisation rebranded itself as Rethink to reflect its expanded focus on mental health, before later rebranding to Rethink Mental Illness in 2011. Keeping the name Rethink Mental Illness, it refreshed its brand in Jan 2025.

Rethink commissioned a controversial statue of Sir Winston Churchill in a straitjacket, which was unveiled in The Forum building in Norwich on 11 March 2006, to a mixture of praise and criticism. This was part of Rethink's first anti-stigma regional campaign. The statue was intended to show how people in today's society are stigmatised by mental illness, based on claims that Churchill lived with depression and perhaps bipolar disorder. However, the statue was condemned by Churchill's family, and described by Sir Patrick Cormack as an insult both to the former prime minister and to people living with mental health problems. Although straitjackets have not been used in UK psychiatric hospitals for decades, someone living with bipolar disorder identified with "the straitjacket of mental illness" and commended the image. Nevertheless, in response to the complaints, the statue was removed.

Mark Winstanley succeeded Paul Jenkins as chief executive of Rethink Mental Illness in March 2014. The charity's former staff include Judy Weleminsky, who was chief executive of the National Schizophrenia Fellowship from 1985 to 1990.

=== Campaigns ===
Amongst its campaigns Rethink has urged the government to look at the mental health risks of cannabis, rather than "fiddle with its legal status". Cannabis was downgraded from a Class B to a Class C drug in 2004, making most cases of possession non-arrestable. However, Rethink wants government support for new research into the relationship between severe mental illness and cannabis. They have publicly stated, in response to George Michael's advocacy of the drug, that cannabis is the drug "most likely to cause mental illness".

In 2009, Rethink launched Time to Change, a campaign to reduce mental health discrimination in England, in collaboration with MIND. and aims to empower people to challenge stigma and speak openly about their own mental health experiences, as well as changing the attitudes and behaviour of the public towards those of us with mental health problems.

In January 2014, Rethink Mental Illness launched a campaign to “Find Mike”, a stranger who talked a 20-year-old man, Jonny Benjamin, out of taking his life in 2008. The campaign aimed to reunite the two men, with Benjamin seeking to “thank the man who saved my life” after talking him down from Waterloo Bridge, and raise awareness of mental health issues. The campaign spread quickly on social media, and within two days, the stranger’s fiancée spotted it on Facebook and knew instantly that “Mike” was her partner Neil Laybourn. The two arranged to meet, with the moment captured on Channel 4 documentary The Stranger on the Bridge, which explored the issues of the campaign. In March 2016, the Duke and Duchess of Cambridge hosted a screening of The Stranger on the Bridge at Kensington Palace, and a discussion alongside Jonny Benjamin.

Rethink Mental Illness, represented by its Chief Executive Mark Winstanley, was a member of the independent Mental Health Taskforce^{[4]} and is currently the chair of NHS England’s Independent Advisory and Oversight Group on Mental Health which advises NHS England on the strategic direction of its mental health programme.

Rethink Mental Illness provides part of the secretariat for the All Party Parliamentary Group on Mental Health.

=== Mental Health UK ===
Rethink Mental Illness works with partner charities Change Mental Health (in Scotland), MindWise (in Northern Ireland) and Adferiad Recovery (in Wales) as Mental Health UK, a charity registered in 2016, which "brings together the heritage and experience of four charities from across the country who have been supporting people with their mental health for nearly 50 years".

== Funding ==
Rethink Mental Illness sets out annually its financial situation in its trustees' annual report. The trustees have reported as follows:

Year	Total income (£ million)
2024	44.5
2023	40.9
2022	37.5
2021	33.1
2020	31.7
2019	32.7
2018	32.2
2017	33.7
2016	37.0
2015	39.0
2014	48.5
2013	50.9
2012	52.9
2011	54.3

Rethink Mental Illness has an annual income of approximately £44.5 million, according to its Directors, Trustees and Consolidated Financial Statements report for the year ended 31 March 2024.

The vast majority of this income comes from contracts to provide a wide range of mental health services commissioned by statutory sources including local governmental health and social care bodies. Currently around £3.5m of its income derives from individual donations and legacies.

== See also ==
- Association of Mental Health Providers
- Centre for Mental Health
- Improving Access to Psychological Therapies
- Mental Health Foundation
- Mind
- Nacro
- Richmond Fellowship
- Revolving Doors Agency
- SANE
- Stand to Reason (charity)
- Together
- Turning Point

General:

- Mental health in the United Kingdom
