= John Marzillier =

British retired psychotherapist

John Marzillier (born 1946) is a British retired psychotherapist who was described as 'a significant shaper of the profession of clinical psychology' in which he practiced for 37 years.

He co-authored the first three editions of the book "What is Clinical Psychology?" with John Hall. In 2010 he published a memoir "The Gossamer Thread" which was shortlisted for the Mind Book of the Year award. He has also published books on trauma - in 2012 "To Hell and Back" on personal accounts of trauma and in 2014 "The Trauma Therapies".

Marzillier was head of the Oxford NHS Clinical Psychology course until leaving to go into private practice. He was honorary member of the Faculty of Medicine, and honorary clinical lecturer in the Department of Psychiatry, at the University of Oxford.

He has been an outspoken critic of the Improving Access to Psychological Therapies programme and in 2009 debated its main proponent in clinical psychology David M. Clark.

Marzillier grew up initially in Cumbria in the north of England, where his parents established a successful business in the chemical industry after having left Germany in the 1930s. When he was 12 the family moved to the south of England, a change that Marzillier recalls had a big effect on him, as he began commuting with his brother to the City of London School for Boys. He graduated from the University of Oxford then trained in clinical psychology at the Institute of Psychiatry.

He started off as an enthusiastic behaviourist and was involved in the founding of the BABCP, but eventually became skeptical of the claimed scientific foundation for the behaviour therapy in which he had trained. He then quickly became skeptical of aspects of his training in cognitive therapy - regarding the 'core beliefs' as typically metaphysical and moral in tone and more effectively altered by emotional relational experience than challenges to logical propositions. The American founder of the therapy, psychiatrist Aaron Beck, visited Oxford several times in the 1980s when Marzillier was there. Marzillier later trained in cognitive analytic therapy and, despite reservations, psychodynamic therapy.

Since gaining an MA in creative writing, and retiring from psychotherapy practice, he has been writing fiction and poetry as well as non-fiction on various aspects of psychotherapy.
