= Association of Mental Health Providers =

British registered charity

- Abbreviation: AMHP
- Formation: 2005 as Mental Health Providers Forum; relaunched in May 2017 as Association of Mental Health Providers
- Type: Non-governmental organisation
- Legal status: Registered charity
- Purpose: The national voice of mental health charities providing services in England and Wales
- Headquarters: London
- Location: 85 Great Portland Street, London W1W 7LT
- Region served: England and Wales
- Members: Voluntary and community sector mental health service providers
- Interim CEO: Dania Hanif
- Website: amhp.org.uk

The Association of Mental Health Providers (AMHP), known until May 2017 as Mental Health Providers Forum (MHPF), is a registered charity based in London (Note: It is registered in England with the Charity Commission as Voluntary Sector Mental Health Providers Forum, charity 1120222. "Voluntary Sector Mental Health Providers Forum". Charity overview. Charity Commission.) and the representative body for voluntary and community sector mental health organisations in England and Wales, working nationally and regionally to influence practice and policy. It aims to improve the range and quality of mental health services by increasing the involvement of the voluntary sector in delivering them, working in partnership with the wider sector and government agencies. Specific projects include the promotion of innovation in the sector, providing evidence of best practice to achieve the best outcomes for individuals and supporting recovery.

The Association leads a collaboration of voluntary mental health organisations including the Centre for Mental Health, the National Survivor User Network (NSUN), the Mental Health Foundation, Mind and Rethink Mental Illness in the Voluntary, Community and Social Enterprise (VCSE) Health and Wellbeing Alliance with the Department of Health and Social Care, NHS England and Public Health England.

The Association's membership consists of voluntary sector organisations providing mental health services in England. The current interim chief executive officer is Dania Hanif. She succeeded Kathy Roberts, who was appointed in 2012. The first Chief Executive of the Forum was Judy Weleminsky, who was appointed in 2005.

The Association has increased its work to bring the views of mental health service providers into national policy and strategy discussions, working closely with members to inform and implement the 2011 No health without mental health cross-government mental health strategy. An area of focus from 2014 has been housing provision for people with mental health needs. In September 2014, AMHP published a report outlining successful housing models and a national forum is now established.

== Mental Health Recovery Star ==
The Mental Health Recovery Star, which the Association was involved in developing, was launched in 2008. It is part of a family of "Outcomes Stars". It is now being used by many mental health trusts in England and has also been adopted for use by the Mental Health Recovery Service in Queensland, Australia.

== Digital mapping tool ==
In 2023, the Association introduced a digital mapping tool to measure mental health provision across England.

== See also ==
- Child and Adolescent Mental Health Services (CAMHS)
- Improving Access to Psychological Therapies (IAPT)
- Mental health in the United Kingdom

Other UK mental health charities

- Centre for Mental Health
- Mental Health Foundation
- Mind
- Rethink Mental Illness
- Richmond Fellowship
- SANE
- Together for Mental Wellbeing
- Turning Point
