= Whitethorn =

Whitethorn or white thorn may refer to:

== Plants ==
- Acacia constricta, known as whitethorn acacia, a shrub in the family Fabaceae
- Bursaria spinosa, a small shrub in the family Pittosporaceae
- Ceanothus leucodermis, a shrub in the family Rhamnaceae
- Crataegus monogyna, the common hawthorn, a small tree in the family Rosaceae
- Crataegus punctata

== Other ==
- Whitethorn, California, United States
- Whitethorn (Blacksburg, Virginia), U.S., a historic house
- Whitethorn Woods, 2006 novel by Maeve Binchy
- Whitethorn (novel), a 2005 novel by Bryce Courtenay

== See also ==
- Whyte Thorne
- Blackthorn (disambiguation)
