= Time to Change (mental health campaign) =

Mental health campaign in England

- Founded: 2007
- Type: Charitable organisation
- Purpose: Mental illness
- Location: 15–19 Broadway, London
- Region served: England
- Website: www.time-to-change.org.uk

Time to Change is a mental health campaign in England, launched in 2007 with the objective of reducing mental health-related stigma and discrimination.

== Description ==
Time to Change (TTC) was formed in 2007 by mental health charities MIND and Rethink Mental Illness, aiming to reduce mental health-related stigma and discrimination. A specific objective was to reduce stigma and discrimination by 5 per cent in the first 12 months. The first four years were funded by grants of £20.5 million from the Big Lottery Fund and Comic Relief.

TTC also asked organisations and individuals to sign a pledge supporting its anti-stigma programme. Organisations signing the pledge include the Bank of England, the Financial Conduct Authority, British Gas, British Telecom, Lloyds Banking Group, Ernst & Young, E.ON, PepsiCo and parts of the National Health Service. A pledge event took place at the Houses of Parliament in October 2013, giving MPs an opportunity to sign up.

In 2011, TTC launched a four-week television advertising campaign to promote its new slogan: "It's time to talk. It's Time to Change."

The campaign was fronted by a number of celebrities, including political strategist Alastair Campbell, presenter Davina McCall, singers Shojon, Frankie Sandford, and boxer Ricky Hatton. In 2014, the campaign supported the "Laughing for a Change" project run by actress Janice Connolly, which aimed to promote awareness of mental health through a stand-up comedy tour.

Time to Change was drawn to a close on 31 March 2021, saying that despite an "impressive track record, and identifying that the job is not yet done, the Government has confirmed it is not in a position to fund the programme into the future".

== Outcomes ==
An academic study was carried out to measure whether TTC had met their 5 per cent target in the first 12 months. The study measured "progress toward meeting TTC's target of a 5 per cent reduction in discrimination".

An independent evaluation of the campaign's first four years took place in 2013. Though it found a reduction in discrimination from friends and families, change in attitudes from health professionals was negligible.

== Wales ==
In Wales the campaign was launched in 2012 under the name Time to Change Wales, led by Welsh mental health charities MIND Cymru, Gofal and Hafal.

== See also ==
- Mental health in the United Kingdom
