= Crisis cafe =

Form of mental health support

A Crisis café is intended to be a safe, welcoming place where people who are struggling with daily life can go, usually outside of normal working hours, if they urgently need support. They are generally provided by NHS trusts, other mental health service providers or mental health charities in England. They are intended to divert people from A&E departments and other urgent services which may not be appropriate. They are often established in places where a mental health ward is not sustainable. Crisis Cafe's support individuals who are experiencing all types of problems, and they serve support and meals to those who need it most.

Turning Point runs crisis cafes in Leicestershire. Safe Havens run them in Surrey and North Hampshire. Local branches of MIND often run them. Mental health trusts may pay local user organisations to run them. Greater Manchester Mental Health NHS Foundation Trust runs one in Harpurhey. Some of them have communities of regular users. There is evidence that they are popular with service users, reduce admissions to mental health beds and keep people out of Accident and Emergency departments, which are generally not suitable for people with mental health problems as they are almost always busy and stressful places.
