= Beacon UK =

Private mental health service provider, UK

Beacon UK was a private provider of mental health services launched in the UK in September 2011 by Dr Emma Stanton, a practising NHS psychiatrist at the South London and Maudsley NHS Trust.

== Overview ==
Stanton was involved with Beacon Health Strategies, now Beacon Health Options a behavioral health company based in Boston, Massachusetts established in 1996 by Elizabeth Pattullo developing publicly funded mental health managed care programs. The company does not directly deliver mental health care, but attempts to act as an “integrator”, coordinating mental health services from different health and social care providers to ensure care effectively meets the needs of each person with mental health conditions.

Stanton was named as one of the Health Service Journal's most inspirational women in health and one of their Top Innovators. She is a former adviser to Sir Liam Donaldson and co-founded Diagnosis, a clinical leadership social enterprise. From 2010 to 2011, she had a Harkness Fellowship. She is an advocate of outcome measurement in healthcare. She is quoted by the NHS Confederation as saying: “Measuring care and outcomes in mental health is often put in the ‘too difficult’ box yet capturing data on whether people have homes to live in, jobs to go to, appropriate medication, financial stability and social interactions are possible for other conditions so why not for people with mental health problems too.” Beacon recommends treatment at home through teams of doctors, nurses and social workers, not through hospital admission.

== Activities ==
Beacon analysed data supplied by Improving Access to Psychological Therapies providers in 2012.

Beacon UK was part of the Forward Thinking Birmingham consortium which has been selected to deliver mental health services across the city of Birmingham from October 2015. The contract agreed with Birmingham South Central Clinical Commissioning Group requires the consortium to deliver services for children, adolescents and adults under 25 over five years. Community mental health services for children and young people aged 0–25 were criticised by the Care Quality Commission in its report on children's services in the city in 2017.

== See also ==
- Mental health in the United Kingdom
