= National Institute for Mental Health in England =

English medical organisation

National Institute for Mental Health in England (NIMHE) was an English medical organisation established in 2001 under the leadership of Professor Louis Appleby to "coordinate research, disseminate information, facilitate training and develop services". The NIMHE was disbanded and a new body, the National Mental Health Development Unit was launched in 2009. The director of NIMHE, Ian MacPherson, became the director of NMHDU. The NMHDU was also disbanded in March 2011.

One of NIMHE's first publications, titled Cases for Change, was funded by the Department of Health to review documents published since 1997 about adult mental health, and was undertaken in conjunction with the Department of General Practice.
