= Omar Kholeif =

Egyptian artist

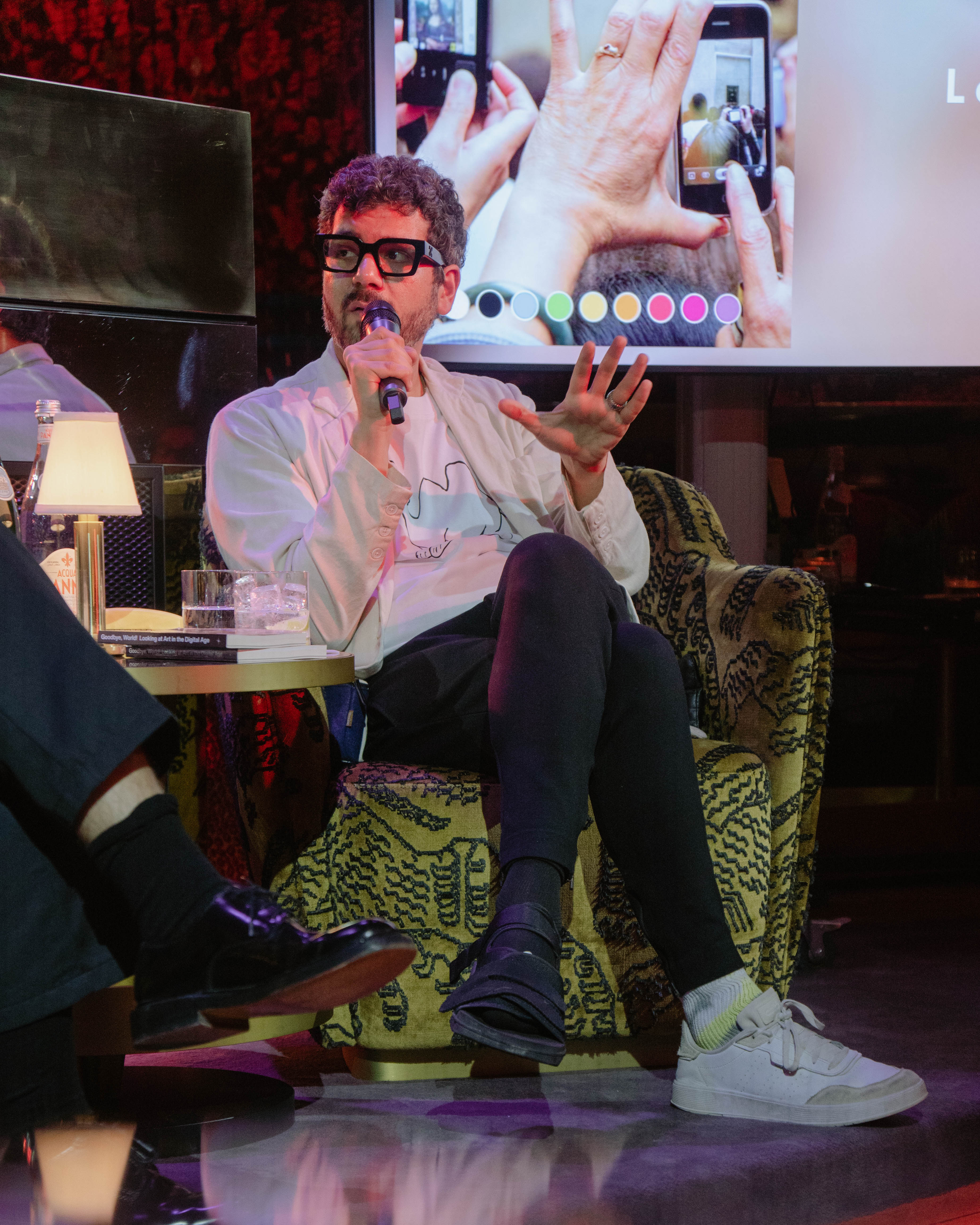
Photo of Omar Kholeif at the Dubai launch of Goodbye, World! Looking at Art in the Digital Age at The Arts Club of Dubai.

Omar Kholeif is an Egyptian-born artist, curator, writer and editor. Kholeif's curatorial practice is concerned with the concept of 'dreamwork'—a form of social imagination concerned with safeguarding diasporic and marginalised aesthetic cultures in the slippery age of the internet.

Dr Kholeif is professor of global art theory and practice at the Glasgow School of Art. In 2025, the Glasgow School of Art's School of Fine Art appointed the "influential and acclaimed academic" as the programme leader for the Masters in Curatorial Practice of Contemporary Art—the first postgraduate curating programme in Scotland. Commenting on their appointment, Professor Martin Newth, head of the School of Fine Art commented, "Omar brings with them a truly global vision, a deep and sustained commitment to artists, and a powerful dedication to foregrounding marginalised and diverse perspectives. Their practice bridges the international with the local, and their return to Glasgow resonates with our ambition to cultivate new forms of curatorial thinking grounded in place, history and community."

Up until fall 2025, Professor Kholeif was a long-serving director at the Sharjah Art Foundation, where they eventually settled into the role of director of collections and senior curator at the foundation. Here, Kholeif was "charged with overseeing the foundation's acquisition strategy, developing exhibitions and other programming, and securing international partnerships". They also worked closely with Hoor Al Qasimi, the president and director of the foundation, supporting the organization open a new purpose built home its collection of twentieth century and contemporary art. Commenting on their appointment, Al Qasimi, the Sharjah Art Foundation president and director, said, "As a leading curator and scholar with a deep knowledge of both the artists and art history of the region and the broader international arts dialogue, Omar brings a critical new dimension that will greatly enhance the advancement of our mission both within the UAE and internationally."

Kholeif's tenure was marked by a series of high-profile exhibitions, the most talked-about of them being Art in the Age of Anxiety, which coincided with the global lockdowns associated with the COVID-19 pandemic.

They followed up this exhibition with an ambitious group show Unsettled Objects at the Foundation's Flying Saucer. The curator remarked that the exhibition sought to consider how "artworks serve as agents of an inclusive collective imagination' in a time of great difficulty".

Their in-depth mid-career exhibition of Hrair Sarkissian: The Other Side of Silence toured globally and secured Sarkissian a Deutsche Börse Photography Foundation Prize nomination.

Among several other highlights, Kholeif curated Turner Prize winning artist, Lubaina Himid's first survey exhibition in the Afro-Asian context, as well as Turner Prize winning artist, Lawrence Abu Hamdan's first survey exhibition entitled, The Sonic Image.

They were named a 40 under 40 Global Influencer by international art magazine, Apollo for the third time for their contributions.

Before their time in the UAE, Kholeif's roles included senior curator at HOME Manchester; co-curator of the 14th Sharjah Biennial; curator of the V-A-C Foundation's Venice headquarters, Palazzo delle Zattere, during the 58th Venice Biennale; a curator for Abu Dhabi Art, and is a guest curator and advisor for numerous international festivals and biennials.

Kholeif was the Manilow Senior Curator and Director of Global Initiatives at the Museum of Contemporary Art Chicago. Prior to that, they were curator at the Whitechapel Gallery, senior editor at Ibraaz Publishing and senior curator at Cornerhouse in Manchester. Previously, they were curator at the Whitechapel Gallery, senior editor at Ibraaz Publishing and senior visiting curator at HOME in Manchester.

== Early life and education ==
Kholeif was born in Cairo, Egypt, and holds degrees from the University of Glasgow, the Royal College of Art, London, and the University of Reading, where they completed their PhD in curatorial and cross-disciplinary cultural studies. They also attended film school—at Screen Academy Scotland and began their career working in documentary film and music.

== Career ==
Previously, Kholeif was curator at the Whitechapel Gallery, senior visiting curator at Cornerhouse and HOME in Manchester, curator at Foundation for Art and Creative Technology (FACT), London and senior editor at Ibraaz Publishing. Their work focuses on issues of narrative and geography in contemporary accelerated culture. They have curated major exhibitions nationally and internationally including the Cyprus Pavilion at the 56th Venice Biennale, Abraaj Group Art Prize at Art Dubai and Armory Focus: Middle East, North Africa and the Mediterranean at the Armory Show, New York.

Kholeif is the author and/or editor of over two-dozen books and has written for The Guardian, Frieze, Wired and HuffPost. Their books include: Vision, Memory and Media (2010), Jeddah Childhood Circa 1994 (2014) and You Are Here: Art After the Internet (2014) which was reviewed in Artforum by Douglas Coupland as the "smartest book on this topic".

In 2014, Kholeif was voted one of the 50 most powerful people in the Middle Eastern art world by Canvas Magazine, one of the 100 most powerful people in the art world by ArtLyst and one of eight curators to watch by Artsy.

Kholeif has taught and guest lectured at numerous universities including the University of Chicago, Hunter College, New York, Northwestern University, and the Ruskin School of Art, University of Oxford. They are a fellow of the Royal Society of Arts, a Churchill fellow, a member of ICOM, the International Council of Museums, CIMAM, International Committee for Museums and Collections of Modern Art, and AICA, the International Association of Art Critics.

== Other activities ==
Kholeif was a co-curator of the 7th Liverpool Biennial in 2012.

In 2017, Kholeif was the recipient of an award from the Graham Foundation.

In 2018, Kholeif was recipient of a Creative Capital | Andy Warhol Foundation Art Writers Grant.

In 2019, Kholeif co-curated the 14th Sharjah Biennial: Leaving the Echo Chamber with curators, Zoe Butt and Claire Tancons.

In 2023, Kholeif was part of the selection committee that nominated Zasha Colah as artistic director of the Berlin Biennale in 2025.

Kholeif is a long-time trustee of SPACE, where they served as the chair for equality diversity and inclusion. Previously, they served as co-director of art and technology programmes with artist, Levin Haegele.

Professor Kholeif is an ambassador for Mental Health Research UK.

In 2025, Kholeif served as a guest critic for The Brooklyn Rail.

Kholeif maintains a longstanding collaborative dialogue with Professor W.J.T. Mitchell around the concept of "the mental traveller". Omar Kholeif and W. J. T. Mitchell are prominent scholars and thinkers in the fields of art history, visual culture, and media theory. They have collaborated on various projects and are known for their critical engagement with contemporary culture, technology, and art.

== Avatars ==
Kholeif works under several guises and pseudonyms. In 2022, they revealed this process overtly when they began to represent themselves in public in performances, lectures, and a podcast entitled, Listening with Artists, as Doctor O. Doctor O, the character, is a curator trapped in the metaverse of their own making.

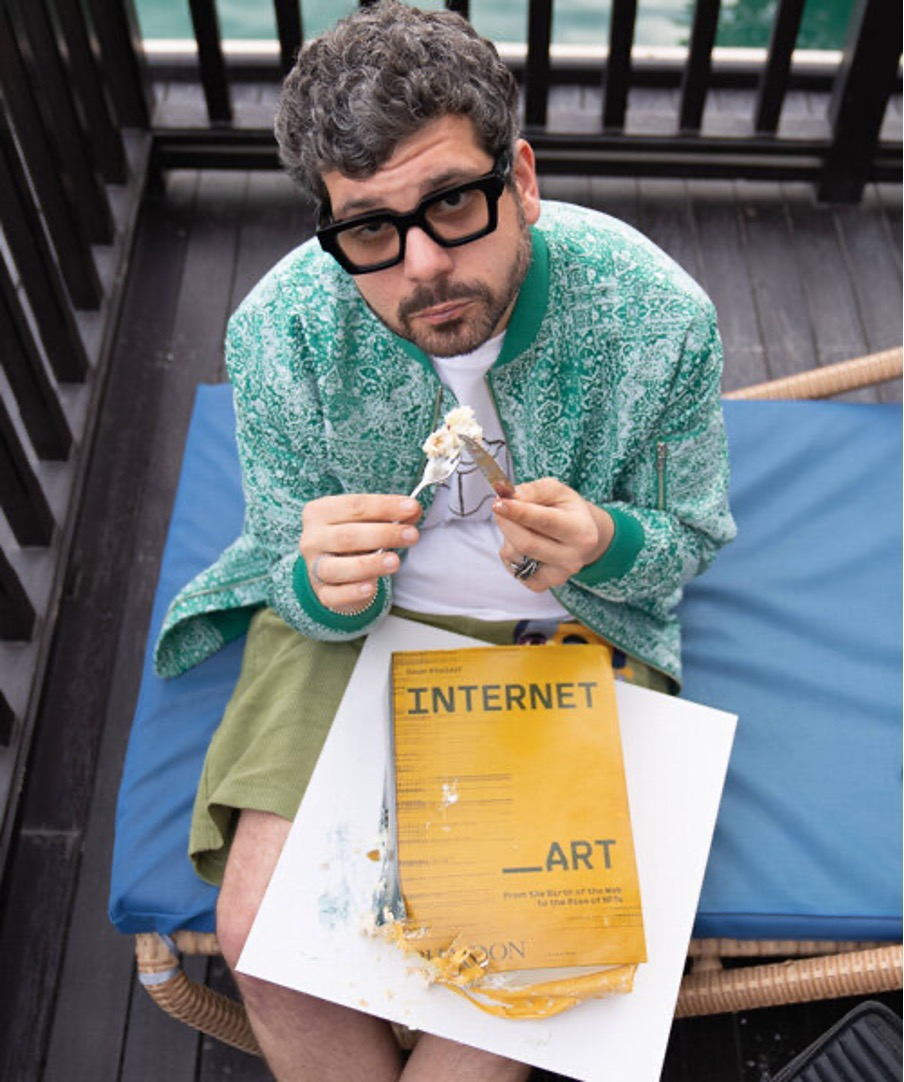
Doctor O asked on social media, '#isitcake or is It #internetart?' poking fun at the 'need' to 'classify' art around medium specificity.

They speak in an octave lower than Kholeif normally does and designs their own custom brand of what they have dubbed "merch couture". These manifestations come to life in an installation and store, Doctor O's Pop Shop, inspired by Keith Haring's Pop Shop from the 1980s.

== Published work ==
Kholeif is a prolific author and editor on the intersection of art, media, and contemporary culture, and has authored over two dozen books, which have been widely translated.

Their critically acclaimed volumes on art, technology, and the politics of looking include You Are Here: Art After the Internet (2014); Goodbye, World! Looking at Art in the Digital Age (2018); Art in the Age of Anxiety (2021), and Internet_Art: From the Birth of the Web to the Rise of NFTs (2023). Their writing on gender, ethnicity, and diaspora studies is noted in the significant text, In the Heart of Another Country (2022), as well as in their involvement as founding series editor of imagine/otherwise, a series of peer-reviewed books on "female worlding" published by Sternberg Press as an "evolving library, anthology, as a score".

== Recognition ==
Dubbed a "Game Changer" by journalist Sophie Hastings in British GQ; author, artist and academic Zachary Cahill has dubbed Kholeif a "Force of Culture".

Kholeif has been called an author of "compulsively readable stories" in the Los Angeles Review of Books and ARTnews, who also has the potential to send readers "down a David Foster Wallace death spiral", as noted in the New York Journal of Books, The New York Times, Hypebeast, Publishers Weekly, and Neural Magazine have all positively reviewed their publications praising him for his ability to narrate "a social history" in "an informative and fast-moving manner" that defies "convention".

== Art, Technology and the Social Imagination ==
In 2012, Kholeif co-founded and continues to serve as the director of artPost21 a not-for-profit agency that Kholeif argues 'signposts' one's way to 21st century visual culture. The project was seeded as part of the Abandon Normal Devices Festival with the intent of commissioning art that engaged with technology and themes of social justice. It was relaunched in early 2022 as a metaverse platform with a revised visual identity designed by graphic designer, Ben Hutchings and a website as artwork by London-based creative studio, Cream Projects. The inaugural video-commission was entitled, Too many Humans. Doctor O's inner world was left to bare in a collaboration with Turner-prize nominated artist, Heather Phillipson, entitled, My Life in the Metaverse. Their jump into the digital world revealed the inequities of life in cyberspace.

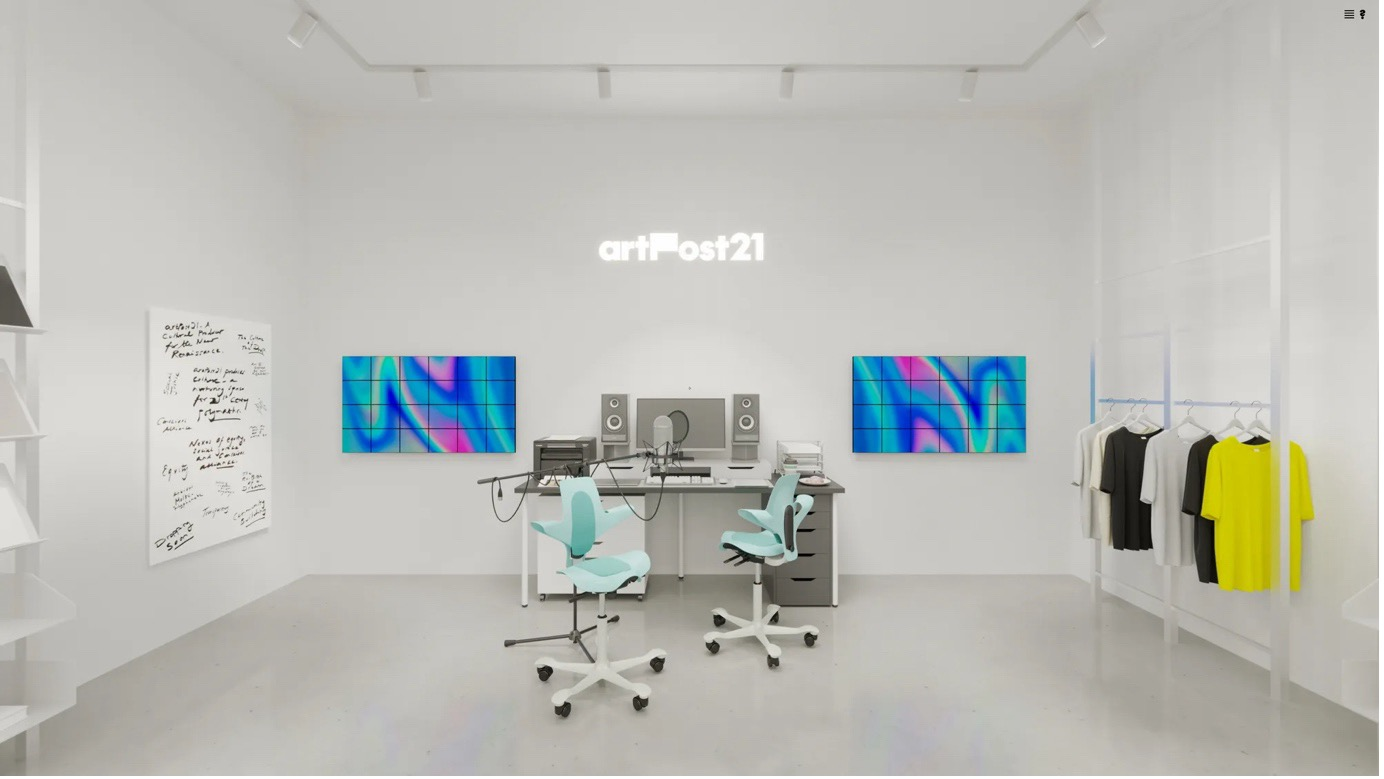

In 2023, with Professor Sarah Perks, joining as co-director of artPost21. The platform was re-visioned as a not-for-profit curatorial and cultural agency for polymaths and multi-hyphenates, focusing energies on collaborative cross-platform relationships. Its graphic identity was slightly revised, and a new website launched with the support of renowned designer, Marwan Kaabour.

One of artPost21's flagship programs is the peer-reviewed publishing imprint, imagine/otherwise for which Kholeif is the founding series editor. The first endeavour is a series of pocket-sized volumes on queer, non-binary and women artists narrated through the lens of 'female worlding'. Published volumes thus far have surveyed the inner lives of artists, Sonia Balassanian, Magda Stawarska, Lalitha Lajmi, Simone Fattal and Huguette Caland. Contributors to the series include Kholeif themselves, as well as Hans Ulrich Obrist, Skye Arundhati-Thomas, Rasha Salti, Sofia Victorino, Zoe Butt, Alison Hearst, Carla Chammas, and Professor Sarah Perks.

== Finding My Blue Sky ==
Over a period of two years, Kholeif collaborated with Lisson Gallery, London and its surrounding community to introduce their concept of 'dreamwork' through the exhibition, Finding My Blue Sky. The exhibition explored concepts of history, home and imagined futures. The exhibition sought to introduce different paths of and to modernity. It was critically acclaimed.

== Selected exhibitions ==
Sharjah Art Foundation

- Sharjah Biennial 14: Leaving the Echo Chamber (with publication) (2019)
- Art in the Age of Anxiety (group show) (with publication) (June–September 2020)
- Unsettled Objects (group show) (with publication) (March 2021)
- Hrair Sarkissian: The Other Side of Silence (with publication) (2021)

1-54 Contemporary African Art Fair

- Continental Drift, London (2021)

The Modern Art Museum of Fort Worth

- Hrair Sarkissian (2020)

Manchester International Festival

- David Lynch: My Head is Disconnected (2019)

V-A-C Foundation

- Time, Forward! Pavilion at the 58th Venice Biennale (with publication) (2019)

Museum of Contemporary Art Chicago

- Basim Magdy: The Stars Were Aligned for a Century of New Beginnings (December 2016) (with publication)
- Eternal Youth (group show) (March 2017)
- Michael Rakowitz: Backstroke of the West (September 2017) (with publication)
- We Are Here (MCA 50th anniversary exhibition) (October 2017)
- Chicago Works: Paul Heyer (Spring 2018) (with publication)
- Otobong Nkanga: To Dig a Hole That Collapses Again (March 2018) (with publication)
- I Was Raised on the Internet (Summer 2018)

Ministry of Education and Culture (Cyprus)

- Cyprus Pavilion at the 56th Venice Biennale: Two Days After Forever, Venice and Alexandria (with publication) (2015)

The Armory Show

- Focus: Middle East, North Africa and the Mediterranean (with publication) (2015)

Art Dubai

- Yto Barrada: Faux Depart (with publication) (2015)
- Before History: Abraaj Group Art Prize (with publication) (2015)

Whitechapel Gallery

- Mike Nelson: Once Again (More Things) (a table ruin) (with publication) (2014)
- Fiona Banner: Stamp Out Photographie (2015)
- Lynette Yiadom-Boakye: Natures Natural and Unnatural (with publication) (2015)
- James Richards: To Replace a Minute's Silence with a Minute's Applause (in partnership with the V-A-C Foundation) (2015)
- Emily Jacir: Europa; Imperfect Chronology: Debating Modernism and Mapping the Contemporary (Works from the Barjeel Art Foundation) (2016–2017)
- Imperfect Chronology: Debating Modernism I and II (with publication) (2016)
- Electronic Superhighway: From Experiments in Art and Technology to Art After the Internet (2016)
- Imperfect Chronology Mapping the Contemporary I and II (with publication) (2016/17)
- Artists' Film International (2014-ongoing)

HOME

- The Heart is Deceitful Above All Things (with publication) (2015)
- Imitation of Life: Melodrama and Race in the 21st Century (with publication) (2016)
- Joana Hadjithomas and Khalil Joreige: I must first apologise...(tour to Villa Arson, Nice and MIT List Visual Art Center, Cambridge, MA) (with publication) (2016)

ICA London

- Whose Gaze Is It Anyway? (2014)

SPACE

- We Are Here (with publication) (2013)

Liverpool Biennial

- The Unexpected Guest (2012):
- Akram Zaatari
- Anja Kirschner and David Panos
- Pedro Reyes
- Jemima Wyman
- Five Videos: Jemima Wyman, Judith Barry, Kristin Lucas, Lucky PDF, Jennifer Chan, Anahita Razmi, Ming Wong, Queer Technologies, Angelo Plessas, Ofri Cnaani, and Adham Faramawy, curated with Joanne McNeill.
- Unexpected Conversations and Acts of Wildness

Cornerhouse

- Protect Me From What I Want (2010)
- Subversion (with publication) (2012)
- Mark Amerika: The Museum of Glitch Aesthetics (2012) in collaboration with Lionel Dobie.
- Jeremy Bailey: Invigilator System (2012)
- What have I done to (de)serve this? in collaboration with BLANKSPACE (2012)
- Clifford Owens (2014)
- Sophia Al-Maria: Virgin With a Memory (with publication) (2014)

FACT, Foundation for Art and Creative Technology

- MyWar (2009)
- I-Dent: Identity and Media Contortion (2010)
- Nam June Paik (2010)
- Ahmed Basiony (2011)
- ZEE (2011)
- Worlds in the Making (2011)
- Topographies of Time (2012)
- Mark Boulos: Echo (2013)
- Science Fiction: New Death with China Miévelle (2014)
