= ClassBento =

Online Marketplace based in Sydney, Australia

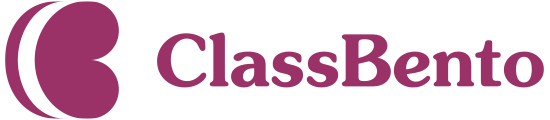
- Industry: Education, Workshops
- Founded: 2016
- Founder: John Tabari, Iain Wang
- Headquarters: Sydney, Australia
- Area served: Australia, United Kingdom, United States
- Key people: John Tabari (Co-Founder); Iain Wang (Co-Founder)
- Products: Workshops, Classes
- Website: classbento.com.au (Australia) classbento.co.uk (United Kingdom) classbento.com (United States)

ClassBento is a global online marketplace specialising in creative workshops and classes, operating in Australia, the United Kingdom and the United States. The platform was co-founded by John Tabari and Iain Wang with the aim of making arts and crafts more accessible to the public and as a means to support local artisans and craft teachers.

== History ==
ClassBento was founded in Australia in 2016 by John Tabari and Iain Wang, who were colleagues at an Australian online retailer. The Sydney-based company aims to connect individuals seeking to learn creative hobbies with creators who offer workshops. Tabari has said the company was inspired partly by his grandmother's experience with dementia and Alzheimer's disease. The company's name derives from the Japanese bento box, reflecting the idea that users can sample a variety of classes, just as a bento box offers a selection of dishes.

Following its success in Australia, ClassBento expanded its services to the UK on 27 November 2020, during the COVID-19 lockdowns, establishing a base in Newcastle upon Tyne. In 2021, as COVID-19 restrictions began to ease globally, ClassBento launched in the United States, initially concentrating on the San Francisco Bay Area and New York City, offering in-person creative workshops run by local artisans alongside virtual classes.

ClassBento's US operations have been covered by U.S. News & World Report, which noted that the company offers in-person classes in the Bay Area and New York City as well as virtual workshops connecting customers with local artisans. Its San Francisco Bay Area presence has also been featured in the local lifestyle publication 7x7, which highlighted its creative classes for adults and children.

ClassBento donates to Dementia Australia with every booking made through its Australian platform and has a charity partnership with Mental Health UK in the United Kingdom. In the United States, the company is listed as a cause-marketing partner of the National Alliance on Mental Illness (NAMI).

Later that year, in December 2021, ClassBento's UK branch received the Silver Positive Impact Award at the SME National Business Awards.

In December 2024, ClassBento acquired Obby, a UK-based online creative workshops marketplace, expanding its United Kingdom inventory of teachers and classes.

== Achievements and milestones ==
Throughout its operation, ClassBento has been acknowledged by several institutions and has received various accolades. The platform was honoured at the Sydney Young Entrepreneur Awards, where Tabari and Wang won the Arts & Culture category in 2021, and received the Silver Positive Impact Award at the UK SME National Business Awards in 2021. In addition, ClassBento has been featured in prominent publications including Vogue Australia and Time Out.
