= Blackthorne (disambiguation) =

Blackthorne is a video game from Blizzard Entertainment.

Blackthorne may also refer to:

- Blackthorne (band), American rock group
- Blackthorne Publishing, comic book publisher
- John Blackthorne, main character of the novel Shōgun and the later miniseries adaptation of it
- Paul Blackthorne, British actor

== See also ==
- Blackthorn (disambiguation)
