= Mary Applebey =

English civil servant and mental health campaigner

Mary Frances Applebey
- Applebey in 1972
- Born: 14 July 1916; Mortlake, Richmond upon Thames, UK
- Died: 1 November 2012 (aged 96); Chelsea, London, UK
- Partner: Edith Agnes (Ad) Leathart

Mary Frances Applebey (14 July 1916 – 1 November 2012) was an English civil servant and mental health campaigner. She was an early director of what is now the charity Mind, but was then the National Association for Mental Health (NAMH). She was involved when Christian Aid was formed, she saw off the Church of Scientology in court and was involved with the changes required to move to care in the community.

== Life ==
Applebey was born in Mortlake in 1916. She was educated in Oxford, graduating in languages at St. Annes College. By then she had met her lifelong partner Edith Agnes (Ad) Leathart. She was fluent in French and German so with her second class degree she joined the war department in 1938. After the war the destruction in Germany included the many people who were displaced and hungry amongst the chaos there. Applebey was there for a year employed by the Allied Control Commission in Berlin. She became involved with various Irish and British church organisations who were uniting to alleviate the problem. This became the charity Christian Aid and Appleby became one of its directors.

Appleby took over as director of the National Association for Mental Health (NAMH) in 1951. The first director was Ms M C Owen and from 1947 the medical director was Dr Alfred Torrie. These roles were combined for her.

The National Association for Mental Health (NAMH) was created in 1946 from three voluntary organisations that provided services for the "maladjusted, emotionally disturbed or mentally handicapped to any degree."

The organisations were the Central Association for Mental Welfare (CAMW), the National Council for Mental Hygiene (NCMH) and the Child Guidance Council (CGC).

In 1969, numerous Scientologists joined the NCMH and attempted to ratify as official policy a number of points concerning the treatment of psychiatric patients. When their identity was realised they were expelled from the organisation en masse. The Church of Scientology in 1971 unsuccessfully sued the NAMH over the matter in the High Court. The case was resisted by Appleby and the NCMH and the case became notable in British charity law.

During the 1970s the NCMH became involved with the debate raised by Ann Shearer that mental hospitals should be shut. Shearer, a Guardian journalist, was joined by Anita Hunt of the Spastics Society and an architect named Sandra Franklin to create the Campaign for the Mentally Handicapped (CMH). They estimated that there were 8,000 mentally handicapped children and they and parent groups wanted this to end. They lobbied the NCMH but Applebey resisted their central objective although they offered support in other areas. Applebey wanted to avoid the hospital v. community debate, but she saw the hospital as a focus for the support. She thought that mental handicap should attract separate government funding.

Her lifelong partner Edith died in 2004. Applebey died in 2012 after a fall at her home in Chelsea.
