= Foundation for People with Learning Disabilities =

UK charitable organization

- The logo of the Foundation for People with Learning Disabilities
- Formation: 1999
- Headquarters: 9th Floor; Sea Containers House; 20 Upper Ground; London; SE1 9QB; United Kingdom.
- Region served: UK
- Chief Executive: Dr Andrew McCulloch
- Parent organization: Mental Health Foundation
- Staff: 11
- Website: www.learningdisabilities.org.uk

The Foundation for People with Learning Disabilities is part of the Mental Health Foundation, a UK charity founded in 1949, and operates as a directorate within the charity.

The Mental Health Foundation originally funded research in both learning disabilities and mental health. In 1999, it created the separate Foundation for People with Learning Disabilities. The aim of the Foundation is to promote the rights, quality of life and opportunities of people with learning disabilities and their families.
