= Praxis Care =

Charity in North Ireland

Praxis Care (formerly Praxis Care Group, Praxis Care International, and Praxis Care Mental Health) is a charity headquartered in Belfast, Northern Ireland. It was incorporated on 3 July 1984,.

It is a company limited by guarantee (NI017623). It has charitable tax status with HM Revenue & Customs (XN80842). It is registered with the Charity Commission for Northern Ireland (NIC103672), The Charities Regulator (Ireland - RCN 20100919) and with HMAG on the Isle of Man (826)

== Activities ==
Praxis Care provides a range of accommodation and support services including residential and supported living, domiciliary care, floating support, home response, carers advocacy, day centers, a befriending department and work skills projects. The people it supports have learning disabilities, mental ill health, dementia and autism. Praxis Care has a dedicated in-house research department which monitors issues as diverse as staff and supported people satisfaction and the evaluation of schemes, as well as doing research into relevant issues.

The organization runs services across Northern Ireland, the Isle of Man, England and the Republic of Ireland. The revenue for Praxis Care in 2023 was £66.7 million

== Staff ==
Nevin Ringland founded the original Praxis Mental Health in 1981 and retired in March 2019. He became the Patron of Praxis Care, while Andy Mayhew took over as chief executive. Carol Breen became CEO in 2023 upon Mayhew's retirement.

The organization has nearly 2,000 staff and volunteers. They were named Employer of the Year at the National Learning Disability and Autism Awards 2023 in Northern Ireland.

== See also ==
- Mental health in the United Kingdom
