= National Confidential Inquiry into Suicide and Homicide by People with Mental Illness =

British public health inquiry

The National Confidential Inquiry into Suicide and Homicide by People with Mental Illness, sometimes referred to as NCISH, based in Manchester University is commissioned by the Healthcare Quality Improvement Partnership on behalf of NHS England, NHS Wales, the Scottish Government Health and Social Care Directorate, the Northern Ireland Department of Health, Social Services and Public Safety, the States of Guernsey and the States of Jersey.

It is directed by Louis Appleby.

Its report in 2014 pointed out that mental health patients are at the highest risk of taking their own lives in the first two weeks after being discharged from hospital.

It produced a report in July 2017 which showed that 25% of young people who die by suicide have suffered a bereavement themselves. In 11% of cases this death was also a suicide.

== See also ==
- Suicide in the United Kingdom
