= Blackthorn Trust =

UK charity in Maidstone, Kent

- Formation: 1986
- Legal status: Charity
- Purpose: Rehabilitation through work and community
- Headquarters: Maidstone
- Location: St Andrew's Road
- Coordinates: 51°16′08″N 0°29′14″E
- Region served: Kent
- Leader: Emma Halpin – CEO
- Budget: £84,000 (1994)
- Website: Blackthorn Trust
- Remarks: Company Limited by Guarantee No. 05964574, Charity No. 1117979

Blackthorn Trust is a UK charity in Maidstone, Kent which offers specialist therapies and rehabilitation through work placements in the Blackthorn Garden. They offer help to people with mental health difficulties, chronic pain and type 2 diabetes. The charity's work is based on the work of Rudolf Steiner (an Austrian philosopher, social reformer), and the charity aims to assist individuals to progress towards their full potential.

== History ==
In 1983, Dr David McGavin was in general practice in Maidstone. Through his work in the local community, he found out that conventional medicine was not able to help patients with chronic illness and were becoming increasingly passive and inactive, which was not helpful for their illness. He then met Hazel Adams (an art therapist) working on anthroposophical principles of Rudolf Steiner. As they worked on few of the Dr McGavin's most severe patients, several noted improvements were made. More therapists were brought into the small practise but this became impractical. So he decided to set up a new trust and a new medical centre.

== Blackthorn Medical Centre ==
This is owned by the Blackthorn Trust and part of it rented to the Practice. It was built in 1991, designed by Camphill Architects (from the Camphill Movement) and opened in December. As a result of the fundraising and hard work of patients, their families and friends, local and national industry, grant making trusts and the National Health Service. They may be prescribed anthroposophic medication and one of a number of anthroposophic therapies which are available on a one-to-one or group basis. These include biographical counselling, eurythmy therapy, rhythmical massage (developed by Ita Wegman) or art therapy. Therapies are offered at the discretion of the doctor.

It provides the usual family doctor services for around 7,200 people and is a GP training practice. Blackthorn Trust rents its premises via the NHS to the primary care team and the complementary practitioners.

The centre and trust is partially funded by the NHS, but needs to raise an additional £100,000 per year to cover its running costs. This is achieved by grants, donations, bequests and fund raising activities (including selling produce from the garden).

== Blackthorn Garden ==
On the site of the grounds of the former psychiatric hospital of Oakwood Hospital, it occupies 22 acres and is under the direction of the Trust Management Team. Founded in 1991 and funded by the Trust. It has a flower garden, greenhouse and lath house (a framework of treated lumber covered with plastic netting, giving shade and protection for young plants). The lath house is a relic from the mental asylum. There is also a very large vegetable garden, a craft room for art therapy, a Cafe and kitchen serving organic lunches.

The garden has up to 60 people working in the garden per week.

In 1995, the garden and its therapies were evaluated by the Centre for Mental Health.

The aims of the garden:

- To establish a place of rehabilitation through work for the mentally ill in the community.
- To create a place of social integration and cultural activity in the Barming District of Maidstone.
- To encourage the meeting and working together of the various disciplines concerned with mental health and community care.

The garden is opened, Monday to Saturday – 9:30 am to 3:30 pm. On Saturdays, workshops are open to the general public.

The garden also has a shop (run by volunteers) selling second-hand clothes and other used items.

The trust has various events during the year including Spring Fair, Summer Fair, Christmas Fairs. Selling local handmade crafts and specialist food stalls as well as the traditional stalls.

== Funders ==
The local community and the people of Kent, Abbey National Trust, Alchemy Trust, Aylesford Samaritan Benevolent Fund, Big Lottery Fund, Esmée Fairbairn Foundation, European Social Fund, The Hambland Foundation, Hayward Foundation, Interreg IIIa, Smith's Charity, Invicta Community Care NHS Trust, Kent Social Services, Kimberly Clark PLC, Lankelly Chase, Lloyds TSB PLC, Mental Health Foundation, The Percy Bilton Charity, The Pilgrim Trust, Rochester Bridge Trust, Smith Kline Beecham PLC, South East Regional Health Authority, Tudor Trust, West Kent Health Authority and Wimpy PLC.

== Awards ==
- Leisure and Outdoor Furniture Association (LOFA) Charity Award 1999
- NHS Beacon Training Practise 1999/2000
- Joint Winner HRH Prince of Wales Award for 'Good Practice in Integrated Health' 2001 and 2002
- Finalist in 2003 NHS Health & Social Care Awards, patient-centred cancer care section
- Royal College of General Practitioners (RCGP)/ Leonard Cheshire / RCGP 2009 Disability Care Award

== Visits ==
- Julia Cumberlege, Baroness Cumberlege Minister of Health (1992–1997) for the House of Lords
- Nigel Crisp Chief Executive NHS (2000–2006)
- Jonathan Shaw (politician) Labour Minister for Disabilities in Department for Work and Pensions (2008–2010), in 2012 after losing his seat he has now become a Blackthorn Trust Member,
- Charles, Prince of Wales
