= The Stranger on the Bridge =

2015 documentary film

The Stranger on the Bridge is a 2015 documentary film, produced and directed by Sam Forsdike and Richard Bentley of Postcard Productions. It was shown on Channel 4 on 4 May 2014.

It is an adaptation of a promotional film made in 2014 for the charity Rethink Mental Illness called Finding Mike.

== Synopsis ==
The documentary follows the then 26-year-old Jonny Benjamin as he tries to find the man who dissuaded him from taking his own life by jumping from Waterloo Bridge in London in 2008. Benjamin had nicknamed the man 'Mike', since he was not able to remember his actual name.

== Reception ==
The reception for Stranger on the Bridge was largely positive receiving reviews in The Guardian, The Daily Telegraph and The Independent.

The Radio Times called it a "remarkable, joyous, painful and ultimately life-affirming film".

The combination of the documentary and preceding campaign is estimated to have reached 319 million people worldwide.

== Adaptations ==
The story of Benjamin's search was rumoured to be considered for a Hollywood film. The rights have also been acquired by Pan Macmillan's wellness and lifestyle imprint Bluebird as part of a two-book deal.

== Awards ==
- Win - Best Single Documentary - Televisual Bulldog Awards
- Nominated - Best Newcomer Award Sam Forsdike - The Grierson Trust British Documentary Award
- Nominated - Documentary Awards - The Grierson Trust British Documentary Award
- Nominated - Breakthrough Award - Behind the Screen - Royal Televisual Society
