= Louis Appleby =

British psychiatrist (born 1955)

Professor Sir Louis Appleby CBE FRCP FRCPE FRCPsych
- Born: 27 February 1955 (age 71)
- Occupation: Psychiatrist

Sir James Louis John Appleby (born 27 February 1955) is a British psychiatrist who leads the National Suicide Prevention Strategy for England and directs the National Confidential Inquiry into Suicide and Homicide by People with Mental Illness. He runs the Centre for Mental Health and Safety at the University of Manchester.

== Career ==
After attending Bathgate Academy in West Lothian, Appleby studied at the University of Edinburgh where he received a BSc in biomedical sciences in 1977, followed by an MB ChB medical degree in 1980. He trained in psychiatry at the Institute of Psychiatry and also in hospital medicine at Maudsley Hospital in London, then became Member of the Royal College of Physicians (MRCP) in 1983 and Member of the Royal College of Psychiatrists (MRCPsych) in 1986. He was awarded an MD higher degree in 1995. Appleby was elected Fellow of the Royal College of Physicians of Edinburgh (FRCPEd) in 1995, a Fellow of the Royal College of Psychiatrists (FRCPsych) in 1996, and Fellow of the Royal College of Physicians of London (FRCP) in 2008. Appleby was appointed Commander of the Order of the British Empire (CBE) in the 2006 New Year Honours for services to Medicine.

Appleby was the UK Government's first National Director for Mental Health ('mental health tsar') from 2000 to 2010, then the first National Clinical Director for Health and Criminal Justice from 2010 until 2014. He was also involved in the development of Improving Access to Psychological Therapies. Activist Pete Shaughnessy and others in the mental health user/survivor movement reportedly found Appleby, in his role as mental health tsar, "elusive".

Appleby is a non-executive director of the Care Quality Commission.

In February 2015 Appleby announced on Twitter that he had pulled out of giving a presentation to the Ministry of Justice after being told not to mention falling staff numbers when discussing the rising suicide rate in prisons; he was supported by then shadow justice secretary Sadiq Khan.

In December 2015 Appleby was appointed by the General Medical Council to improve how it deals with doctors who are vulnerable or at risk when investigated for fitness to practice medicine; in April 2016 he reported that the number of investigations by the GMC should be reduced in favour of local resolution and that investigations should be 'paused' if the root cause is a health problem requiring treatment.

Appleby was knighted in the 2023 New Year Honours for services to medicine and mental health. He was elected a Fellow of the Academy of Medical Sciences in 2026.
