= Blackthorn (American band) =

American Celtic rock band

- Origin: Pennsylvania
- Genres: Celtic rock, folk rock
- Years active: 1990–2017
- Label: Independent
- Members: Rob Dunleavy; Mike Boyce; John McGroary; John Boyce; Mike O'Callaghan
- Website: http://www.irishthing.com/home.html

Blackthorn is an Irish-American band formed in Pennsylvania in 1990. Their style of music has come to be called Celtic Rock for the fusion of Irish traditional instruments and music with modern rock. They have released five albums, starting with It's an Irish Thing in 1993 and most recently Push & Pull in 2006. Their repertoire consists of Traditional Irish songs and tunes as well as original Irish-rock compositions and Irish folk songs with a rock twist.

== History ==
Mike and John Boyce are the sons of Barney Boyce, an Irish immigrant from County Donegal and U.S. Army veteran. Drummer, Mike "Casba" O'Callaghan was born in Tralee, County Kerry, the only member of the band born in Ireland. Paul Moore, a founding member along with John McGroary, was the frontman for the band until 2005. Blackthorn was formed in 1990 in the Philly area, with influences from The Clancy Brothers and The Dubliners.

Their first album, "It's an Irish Thing", and the song Celtic Symphony became a hit in the Philadelphia area in 1994. Their second album Here We Go Again featured more of a rock feel owing to the addition of noted Philadelphia guitarist, educator and songwriter Gerry Mcwilliams who played all of the electric guitar, mandolin and most of the bass for the album. He performed with the band from April 1995 to February 1996. After McWilliams' departure Seamus Kelleher then joined the band on guitar in 1996 for live shows and his debut appearance on the band's third record in 1998. "The Other Side", their third album, got major airplay on the East Coast and was the first with entirely original compositions. Singer Mike Boyce, younger brother of John Boyce, joined in 1999.

In 2011, Seamus Kelleher left the band to pursue a solo career. He had been suffering from health problems ever since falling down a flight of stairs at a King of Prussia bar. Kelleher still makes guest appearances with the band on occasion. Rob Dunleavy replaced him on lead guitar. They were the headlining band at the 2012 Haverford Music Festival. Blackthorn has frequently played at the Rose Tree Park festival. They performed at the Inaugural Cheesesteak Fest in 2015.

== Members ==
=== Current ===
- Mike Boyce – bass, acoustic guitar, keyboards, whistles, and vocals
- John McGroary (founding member) – accordion
- John Boyce – keyboards, mandolin, and vocals
- Mike O'Callaghan – drums, percussion, vocals
- Rob Dunleavy – guitar and vocals

=== Former ===
- Seamus Kelleher – lead guitar
- Paul Moore - guitar, lead vocals, founding member
- Gerry Mcwilliams - Electric guitar, Mandolin, Bass

== Discography ==
- It's an Irish Thing (1994)
- Here We Go Again (1996)
- The Other Side (1998)
- Ratty Shoes (2001)
- Push & Pull (2006)
