= Mental Health Research UK =

British mental health charity

Mental Health Research UK (Charity No: 1125538) is the UK's first charity dedicated to funding research into the causes of mental illness in order to develop better treatments with fewer side-effects.

== Activities ==
Co-founded in 2008 by Professor Clair Chilvers, the late John Grace QC, and Dr. Laura Davidson, the charity advertises funds available for Ph.D. research scholarships, for which Universities apply. The charity has a scientific advisory board, and shortlisted candidates are interviewed. The successful University then advertises for the best Ph.D. student in a further competitive process.

To date, Mental Health Research UK has awarded nineteen research scholarships, each worth in the region of £120,000, in the areas of schizophrenia, depression, bipolar, and suicidal behaviour. In 2014, MHRUK linked with the Schizophrenia Research Fund (SRF), with the Trustees of SRF joining MHRUK's Trustees who now manage both charities. MHRUK has pledged to use 95% of all funds raised for the charity for its core aim: mental health research.

Mental Health Research UK has a strong link to the legal profession, with three of its Trustees being barristers (John Grace QC, Dr. Laura Davidson, and the (now former) President of the Supreme Court, Lord David Neuberger). The charity set up the John Grace QC Ph.D. scholarship focusing on schizophrenia in memory of the late John Grace who died from a brain tumour in 2011, and who had a relative who suffered from the disorder.

In 2015 it was reported that funding levels for mental health research were chronically underfunded in the UK, as well as failing to attract young academics. It was reported as "an area that receives nowhere near as much in public donations as research into cancer or heart disease does". Chilvers said "that although 23% of ill health is attributable to mental illness, 5.5% of research funding is on mental health" and that "for every £1 the UK government spends on research, the public gives a third of a penny to mental health research compared with £2.75 in cancer and £1.35 in cardiovascular disease".

=== Depression awareness campaign ===
Mental Health Research UK has an annual depression awareness campaign on the third Monday of January each year called Blooming Monday. Everyone is encouraged to wear bright clothes for the day to engender discussion about mental health issues and break down stigma. Voluntary donations contribute towards research into depression. Stephen Fry and Ruby Wax have both tweeted their support of the charity's campaign.

=== COVID-19 trauma campaign ===
In Mental Health Awareness Week 2020, Mental Health Research UK announced an intention to offer a new Ph.D. research scholarship on the psychological trauma arising from the COVID-19 pandemic, given the crisis in mental health resulting from lockdown and economic deprivation. Supporters were encouraged to undertake small challenges, with all funds going to the new scholarship.

== Trustees ==
Professor Clair Chilvers, Dr. Laura Davidson (Barrister-at-Law), Lord David Neuberger (former President of the Supreme Court), Professor Nick Rawlins, David Pugh, Ann Dickinson BVSc. MRCVS, David Riggs, Laura Purdam, Dr. Vanessa Pinfold, and Professor Sir Michael Owen.

== See also ==
- Mental health in the United Kingdom
