= David M. Clark =

British psychologist

David Millar Clark (born 20 August 1954) is a British psychologist.

== Career ==
Clark was born in Darlington and studied experimental psychology at Oxford University. He trained as a clinical psychologist at the Institute of Psychiatry. He then returned to teach at Oxford University where he became a professor, then returned to the IOP where in 2000 he became head of psychology and founded the centre for anxiety disorders and trauma at the IOP and associated Maudsley Hospital along with fellow Oxford psychologists trauma-specialist Anke Ehlers and OCD-specialist Paul Salkovskis.

He has been a Professor of Psychology at the University of Oxford since 2011 and is also National Clinical Adviser at the Department of Health.

== Research ==
His clinical research and practice has mainly focused on developing cognitive models and cognitive therapy for anxiety disorders. His research has focused on panic disorder, hypochondriasis, social phobia and posttraumatic stress disorder. Clark was strongly influenced by the American psychiatrist Aaron T. Beck who made long visits to Oxford University in the 70s and 80s, whose head of psychiatry Michael Gelder strongly believed in cognitive therapy.

Clark was instrumental, with the economist Richard Layard, in the development and implementation of the Improving Access to Psychological Therapies programme from 2003. In 2014, with Layard, he published the book Thrive: The Power of Evidence-Based Psychological Therapies, in which the authors demonstrate the potential value of the wider availability of modern talking therapies.

== Personal life ==
He is married to the psychologist Anke Ehlers.

== Honours ==
Clark has won numerous awards in the UK and the USA.

He was appointed Commander of the Order of the British Empire (CBE) in the 2013 New Year Honours for services to mental health.

In 2016, Clark was elected a Fellow of the Academy of Social Sciences (FAcSS).
