= Black Thorn =

Black Thorn may refer to:

- Black Thorn (album), the fifth studio album by the Celtic punk band Flatfoot 56
- Rogue Spear: Black Thorn, an add-on for the video game Tom Clancy's Rainbow Six: Rogue Spear
- Member of the Circle of the Black Thorn, a fictional secret society in the television show Angel
