= Anke Ehlers =

German PTSD psychologist

Anke Ehlers FBA FMedSci
- Born: 11 January 1957 (age 69); Kiel, West Germany
- Spouse: David M. Clark

Academic background
- Education: University of Tübingen (PhD); University of Marburg (habilitation)

Academic work
- Discipline: Psychologist
- Sub-discipline: Post-traumatic stress disorder
- Institutions: King's College London; University of Oxford

Anke Ehlers FBA FMedSci (born 11 January 1957) is a German psychologist and expert in post-traumatic stress disorder (PTSD). She is a Fellow of the major science academies of the UK and Germany.

Ehlers currently works at the University of Oxford as Wellcome Trust Principal Research Fellow and Professor of Experimental Psychopathology.

Along with her husband David M. Clark, she developed a cognitive model for PTSD. Therapies based on this model are recommended for treating PTSD by the American Psychological Association. Ehlers's research has revealed that PTSD is a common issue among emergency medical workers, and that a commonly used therapy for PTSD, psychological debriefing, has little proven therapeutic value.

== Professional career ==
Ehlers studied psychology at the University of Kiel and the University of Tübingen, earning a diploma from Tübingen in 1983. She finished her Ph.D. from the same institution in 1985, and earned a habilitation from the University of Marburg in 1990.

While finishing her Ph.D., Ehlers worked at Stanford University from 1984 to 1985 as assistant director of the Laboratory for Clinical Psychopharmacology and Psychophysiology.

After an assistant professorship at the University of Marburg, she became a full professor at the University of Göttingen in 1991.

Ehlers moved to Oxford as Wellcome Trust Principal Research Fellow in 1993. While there, in 1999, she was the lead author of the paper "A cognitive model of posttraumatic stress disorder".

She moved to King's College London in 2000, where she led a group that developed a therapy based on her and Clark's model. She returned to Oxford as Wellcome Trust Principal Research Fellow and Professor of Experimental Psychopathology in 2012; she retains a visiting position at King's College London.

=== Awards and honours ===
In 2004, Ehlers was elected a Fellow of the German Academy of Sciences Leopoldina. She was elected a Fellow of the British Academy in 2010, a Fellow of the Academy of Medical Sciences in 2014, and is also a member of the Academia Europaea. In 2018 she was appointed Senior Investigator at the UK's National Institute for Health and Care Research (NIHR).

== Personal life ==
Ehlers was born in Kiel, West Germany. She is married to her colleague David M. Clark.
