= Turning Point (charity) =

Health and social care services provider

Turning Point is a health and social care service provider that utilises a person-centred care approach to support individuals with complex needs, which include drug and alcohol-related issues, mental health, learning, and employment-related issues.

== Organization ==
Turning Point is a social enterprise and registered charity based in the United Kingdom that runs projects in more than 240 locations across England and Wales. The organisation provides services support for a range of people, including those with mental health issues, learning disabilities and/or substance-related disorders. In addition to providing direct services, Turning Point also campaigns on behalf of those with social care needs.

As of 2025, it has a turnover of £192M, £60M of which is for the delivery of substance misuse services, £18m for the delivery of mental health services, and £34M for the delivery of support to people with a Learning Disability.

== History ==
Turning Point developed out of The Camberwell Alcohol Project in South East London and was founded by Barry Richards, a London businessman, in 1964.

The charity was described as "one of Princess Diana's favourite charities"; she acted as its patron from 1985 to 1997.

In 2001, Lord Victor Adebowale became Chief Executive, remaining until 2020 when he left to take up a new position as permanent Chair of the NHS Confederation.

=== Controversies ===
In 2012, the charity unsuccessfully challenged Norfolk County Council in a public procurement case at the High Court. In the course of a tender exercise, Turning Point had requested some additional staff TUPE information which the Council never provided. Turning Point submitted a tender for service provision with a caveat that it would need to reconsider costs if it turned out that the charity incurred any redundancy costs once the full TUPE position became clear. The Council rejected their tender as not compliant with the rules set out in the tender documents, which excluded caveats to proposals and variant bids. Turning Point issued legal proceedings, but the High Court ruled their claim was time-barred: they should have claimed before the date when they submitted their tender, knowing that information the charity considered necessary to submit a compliant tender had not been provided. The case confirmed that it is legitimate and fair to include a requirement in a tender barring caveats and qualified bids.

In 2015 the charity denied accusations of "black on black racism" in its appeal against the decision of an earlier employment tribunal that Adebowale had unfairly dismissed the charity's IT director, Ibukun Adebayo. The tribunal found that Adebayo's actions in accessing lewd emails about her from the charity's deputy chief executive to Adebowale constituted gross misconduct, but ruled that this did not justify Adebowale's actions. Adebayo's lawyers said that the actions were unfair because the deputy chief executive's behaviour "was more serious than the claimant's by way of his seniority and position as sponsor of Turning Point's equal opportunities policy."

== Rightsteps and livelife ==
In 2010, Turning Point established Rightsteps, a business-to-business mental well-being and health solutions provider that supports employers and employees in large organisations, small and medium enterprises, and not-for-profit organisations.

In 2019, in order to reach more people and respond to a growing number of people looking for support, Turning Point established livelife, a private pay, direct-to-consumer, online therapy service. The objective of livelife is to support those who do not qualify for mental health help because their issues are not considered severe enough, and to support those who don't want to wait for an NHS appointment, but want the same assurances of quality. All livelife and Rightsteps profits go back to Turning Point, aiming to support the most vulnerable people in society.

== See also ==
- Care Quality Commission
- NHS England
- Public Health England
- National Voices
- Centre for Mental Health
- Improving Access to Psychological Therapies
- Mental Health Foundation
- Mental Health Providers' Forum
- Nacro
- Together

General:

- Mental health in the United Kingdom
