= Revolving Doors (charity) =

UK charity

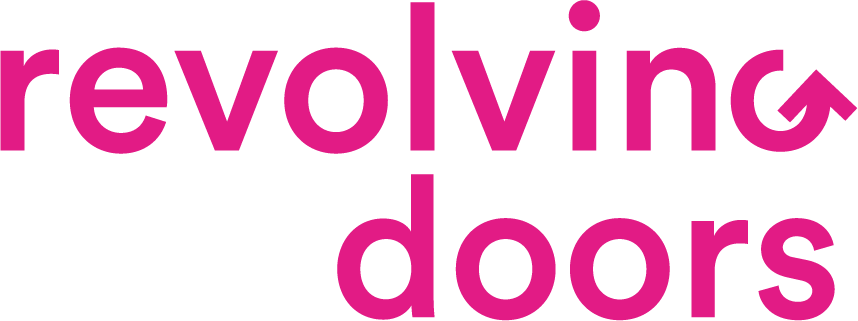
- Revolving Doors logo
- Formation: 17 August 1993; 33 years ago
- Type: Charitable organisation
- Headquarters: Southbank Technopark; 90 London Road; London; SE1 6LN
- Location: Elephant and Castle, London, United Kingdom
- Region served: England and Wales
- Chief Executive: Pavan Dhaliwal
- Affiliations: Criminal Justice Alliance, Mental Health Alliance, Transition to Adulthood Alliance, Offender Health Collaborative
- Staff: 11
- Website: revolving-doors.org.uk

Revolving Doors is a charitable organisation in the United Kingdom which works across England and Wales. Through research, policy and campaigning work, the organisation aims to improve services for people with multiple needs who are in repeat contact with the criminal justice system.

== Vision ==
The vision of the organisation is that by 2025 there is an end to the revolving door of crisis and crime, when anyone facing multiple problems and poor mental health is supported to reach their potential, with fewer victims and safer communities as a result.

== Activities ==
To fulfil its vision, Revolving Doors organises its work around three areas:

- Policy and Communications - Working with policymakers in national and local government, across Whitehall and in local and regional authorities, to improve responses for the revolving doors group. This work is informed by their research, the work of the organisation's service user forums and their partnership and development work across the country.
- Service User Involvement - The organisation operates a national service user forum and a young peoples’ forum. The Forums bring together individuals from different areas of the country who have experienced mental health and other problems and have had contact with the criminal justice system. The forums are designed to root the organizations work in the reality of people's experiences.
- Local Partnerships and Development - Revolving Doors works with organisations and individuals across England and Wales to demonstrate solutions for the revolving doors group.

== Definition ==
The revolving door group refers to the experiences of people who are caught in a cycle of crisis, crime and mental illness, whereby they are repeatedly in contact with the police and often detained in prison as well as being victims of crime themselves. This is a group that often has multiple problems for which they need the input of a wide range of agencies, including housing, drugs, mental health, and benefits. The mental health problems of the group are usually a core or exacerbating factor. Routinely, they fall through the gaps of existing mental health service provision, as their mental health problems are not considered sufficiently "severe" to warrant care from statutory services; but they are frequently excluded from mainstream services in the community, such as GPs and Housing Associations, on account of the perceived complexity of their needs and their often challenging behaviour. Consequently, the lack of support contributes to a downward spiral that brings people into contact with the criminal justice system. It is estimated that the number of individuals within the revolving door group is approximately 60,000 at any one time.

== Organisation ==
=== Formation ===
In 1992 a report undertaken by NACRO and an ITV Telethon identified a group of people who were caught in a downward cycle of homelessness and found themselves in repeat contact with both the mental health and criminal justice system. This group was identified as the 'revolving doors' group, which subsequent research has estimated to include 60,000 people at any one time.

Following the publication of the report in 1993, the Revolving Doors Agency was established by some of the parties involved in the initial publication who sought to demonstrate new ways of working in these three areas of criminal justice, mental health and homelessness. The focus of the organisation was on the people who kept falling between the mainstream services in the community.

Initially, the organisation conducted research in prisons and police stations to identify the needs of the revolving doors group and establish the issues they faced.

In the late 1990s the organisation established a series of experimental services, called Link Worker Schemes, to test effective interventions for their target group. The schemes offered individuals practical and emotional support, assisting them to access appropriate services and to address the underlying causes of their offending behaviour. An independent evaluation conducted by the Home Office found that the scheme cut reoffending by 22 per cent.

Following a strategic review in 2006, the organisation adjusted its focus to research, policy and campaigning work in relation to people who become stuck in a cycle of mental health problems and crime. The Link Worker Schemes were passed over to other voluntary sector providers.

=== Funding ===
The organisation is funded by charitable donations from individuals, grants from statutory bodies and applications to charitable foundations. Recent funders include the Big Lottery Fund, the Esmée Fairbairn Foundation, The Henry Smith Charity, the Paul Hamlyn Foundation, the Pilgrim Trust and Trusts for London. The organisation has previously received funding from Comic Relief.

Revolving Doors has also received pro-bono support from Clifford Chance who, in partnership with the University of Cambridge Pro Bono Society, assisted the organisation with additional research.

=== Governance ===
Revolving Doors is governed by a Board of Trustees who oversee the activities of the organisation, which itself is run by a team of nine members of staff who are supported by associates across the country. The organisation is a registered private company limited by guarantee, with no share capital, which means it is run for non-profit purposes. It is a recognised as a charity by the Charities Commission.

=== Partnerships ===
The organisation affiliates itself to the Criminal Justice Alliance, a coalition of 58 organisations involved in policy and practice across the criminal justice system, the Mental Health Alliance, a coalition of 75 organisations which aims to secure a better mental health legislation, and the Transition to Adulthood Alliance, which works to improve the opportunities and life chances of young people in their transition to adulthood, who are at risk of committing crime and falling into the criminal justice system.

=== Patrons ===
The current patrons of Revolving Doors are Lord David Ramsbotham GCB CBE (Former Chief Inspector of Prisons), the Rt Hon. Hilary Armstrong (Former Member of Parliament for North West Durham and Cabinet Minister for Social Exclusion and Duchy of Lancaster), Ian Bynoe (Former Acting Deputy Chair of the Independent Police Complaints Commission), Rose Fitzpatrick (Acting Assistant Commissioner for the Metropolitan Police), Professor John Gunn (Professor of Forensic Psychiatry at the University of Birmingham), Dru Sharpling CBE (London Director of the Crown Prosecution Service), His Honour Judge Fabyan Evans, Bharat Mehta OBE (Chief Executive of Trusts for London), Joe Simpson (Consultant) and Peter Wrench, Consultant and Writer, former Prison Service and Home Office Director.

== Publications ==
Revolving Doors has published a number of works with a focus on the revolving doors group who have mental health problems within the criminal justice system, including a report on the financial impact of supporting women with multiple needs in the criminal justice system. This report established that an investment of £18 million per year England-wide in interventions could reduce the cost to the state by £384m over three years and almost £1 billion over five years.

In 2012, Revolving Doors Published Integrated Offender Management - Effective alternatives to short sentences. It also published Ending the Revolving Door – guidance for Police and Crime Commissioners.

== Reception ==
Revolving Doors is widely regarded as one of the UK's leading charities concerned with mental health and the criminal justice system.

In 2002 the organisation received two UK Charity Awards, which are given for outstanding achievements within the UK not-for-profit sector, in the category of Research, Advice and Support, as well as being the Overall Winner.

In 2006 the Revolving Doors Agency received an award from the Care Services Improvement Partnership, part of the Care Services Directorate at the Department of Health, for their Link Worker Scheme in the London Borough of Islington. The same year, the organisation was also highly commended by the Centre for Social Justice.

In 2010, Neighbourhood Link, a scheme in the Islington developed in partnership by St. Mungo's and the Revolving Doors Agency, was highlighted as evidence of good-practice by the Cabinet Office. The scheme helps people with multiple and complex needs who are either involved in crime or at risk of becoming involved in crime and becoming homeless. As a result of the project, contact with the police amongst the users has fallen from 31 per cent to 9 per cent.

== See also ==
- Centre for Crime and Justice Studies
- Howard League for Penal Reform
- Prison Reform Trust
- Rethink Mental Illness
- Richmond Fellowship
- St Giles Trust
