= Mental health in the United Kingdom =

Mental health in the United Kingdom involves state, private and community sector intervention in mental health issues. One of the first countries to build asylums, the United Kingdom was also one of the first countries to turn away from them as the primary mode of treatment for the mentally ill. The 1960s onwards saw a shift towards Care in the Community, which is a form of deinstitutionalisation. The majority of mental health care is now provided by the National Health Service (NHS), assisted by the private and the voluntary sectors.

== Incidence of mental health problems ==
Most mental health problems are not easily defined. The American Diagnostic and Statistical Manual of Mental Disorders and the International Statistical Classification of Diseases and Related Health Problems are most generally used.

A 2017 survey found that 65% of Britons have experienced a mental health problem, with 26% having had a panic attack and 42% saying they had suffered from depression. Surveys have found that mental health problems have been on the rise since 2000, although growing awareness may also be a factor, and there are some counter trends such as a decline in suicide. One survey found that the number of responders who had reported having suicidal thoughts in the past year increased from 3.8 per cent in 2000 to 5.4 per cent in 2014. A different survey was conducted in England in 2014 by NatCen Social Research, in collaboration with the University of Leicester (for NHS Digital), of people aged 16 and over, which indicated that 1 in 5 people (20%) have suicidal thoughts over the course of their life.

2018 was the first year that mental health factors like stress and anxiety caused over half of all absences from work. According to a survey of 3,500 participants by the Office for National Statistics (ONS), the number of adults in Britain with depression has doubled during the coronavirus pandemic with 19.2% experiencing depression in June 2020.

According to a 2023 study conducted by The Dawn, a nationwide investigation into the mental health of 1,000 professionals in executive roles in the UK revealed significant challenges within the professional sphere. Among C-suite executives, 69% reported experiencing work-related stress, with over half (54%) facing burnout or exhaustion, leading to 16% taking extended leaves of up to three months. Work-induced stress manifested as regular anxiety and panic attacks for 54% of respondents, while 47% reported physical symptoms such as heart palpitations and headaches. Additionally, 29% of high-earning professionals admitted to having suicidal thoughts. Furthermore, the study found that 72% of executives surveyed reported suffering from depression, with 34% experiencing severe depression.

Benefit cuts and sanctions "are having a toxic impact on mental health" according to the UK Council for Psychotherapy. Rates of severe anxiety and depression among unemployed people increased from 10.1% in June 2013 to 15.2% in March 2017. In the general population the increase was from 3.4% to 4.1%.

Research published in The Big Mental Health Report 2024 stated that "adults and young people alike feel their wellbeing is getting worse, with adults also reportedly feeling lonelier. 7.8% of adults in the UK felt lonely 'always or often' in 2024". It is estimated that one in four people in England suffer a mental health problem each year.

Other findings by the report included:

- Poor mental health costs £300 billion a year in England
- "Life expectancy of people with a severe mental illness is about 15–20 years shorter than those without"
- Over 2 million people are on waiting lists for NHS mental health support in England
- Over 30% reduction in inpatient beds in Wales between 2011/12 and 2021/22
- Those in England with a mental health problem earn nearly £10,000 less a year
- A 34% increase in children and young people being referred to the NHS with anxiety in Wales between 2015/16 and 2022/23
- 60% of people in the UK said that the cost of living crisis is having a negative impact on their wellbeing
- Those with a severe mental illness have a five times greater chance of dying before the age of 75

=== England ===
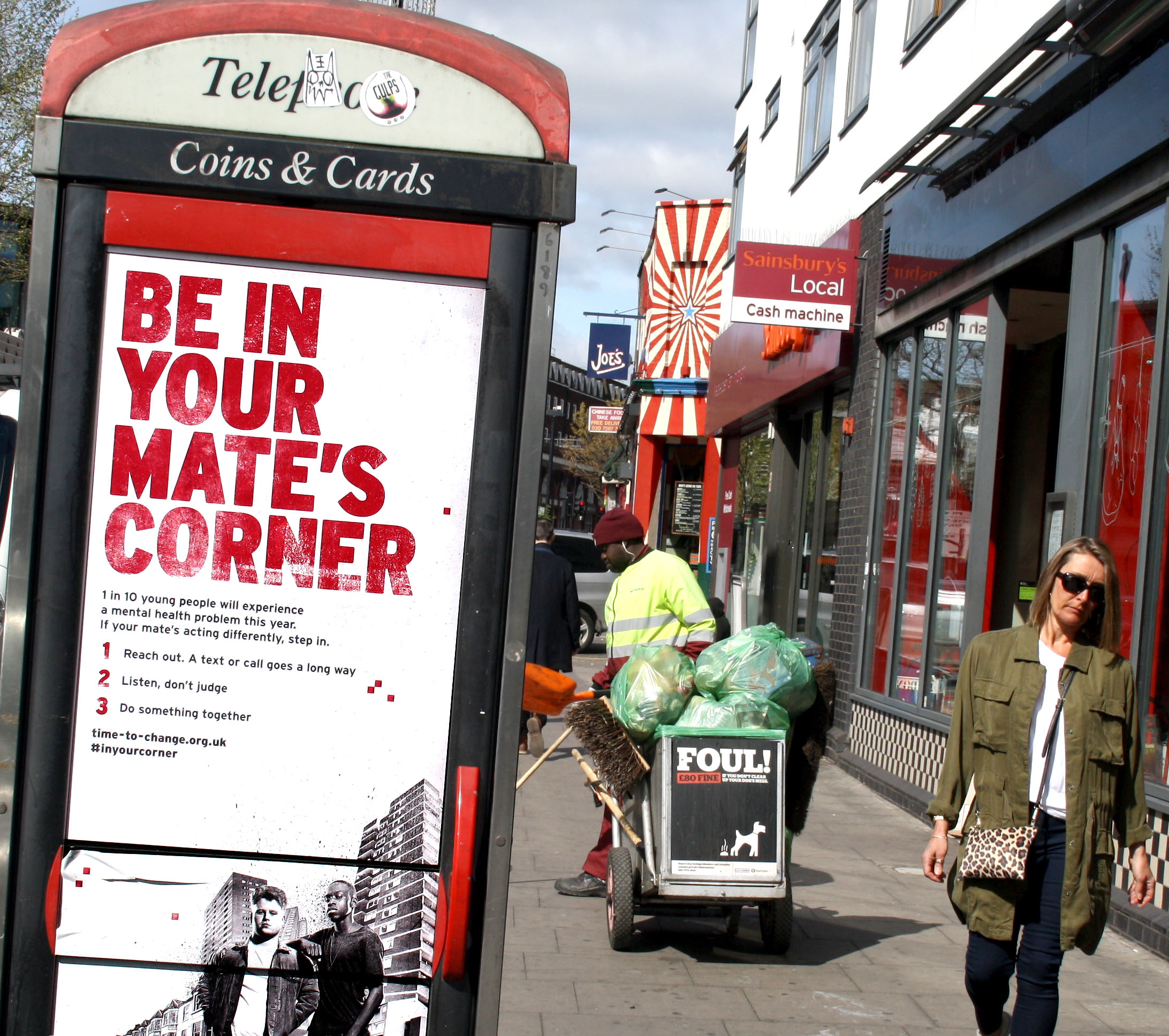
A mental health related poster on a telephone box in the London Borough of Camden in 2017

Estimates to the prevalence of mental illnesses can vary significantly, depending on how the question is presented. The 2014 Adult Psychiatric Morbidity Survey found that 1 in 6 respondents had shown the symptoms of a common mental disorder in recent days, and 1 in 8 reported seeing mental health treatment. In the same year, the Health Survey for England found that 25% of respondents had been diagnosed with a mental illness at some point in their life and a further 18% had had one that was not diagnosed.

==== Children and adolescents ====
In 2020, it was reported that one in six 5 to 16-year-olds in England had a probable mental health difficulty. One in five children and young people aged 8–25 in England had a probable mental disorder in 2023. The restrictions as a response to the COVID-19 pandemic negatively impacted on the mental health of children and young people. In October 2025 507,000 children were in contact with mental health services in England. 958,000 had an active referral to the Children and Young People's Mental Health Services. In 2013–14 there were only 157,000.

Between 2005 and 2017, the number of adolescents (12 to 17 years) who were prescribed antidepressants has doubled. However, antidepressant prescriptions for children aged 5 to 11 decreased between 1999 and 2017. From April 2015, prescription increased for both age groups (for people aged 0 to 17) and peaked during the first COVID-19 lockdown in March 2020.

Between 1998 and 2017, children and adolescents living in deprived areas were more often prescribed antidepressants while Black, Asian and minority ethnic (BAME) teenagers were less likely to receive prescriptions than their White peers. Males were slightly more likely to report incidences of depression, but only 34.1% are prescribed antidepressants, 65.9% to females.

=== Scotland ===
A survey in Scotland found 26% of respondents reported having experienced a mental health problem at some point in their life, but the figure increased if respondents were shown a list of conditions.

=== LGBTQ+ people ===
LGBTQ+ people suffer disproportionately higher mental health problems and risk of suicide than non-LGBTQ+ people in the UK. Reports have found greater degrees of self-harming, suicidal thoughts and suicide attempts among UK LGBTQ+ people than among heterosexual cisgender people in the UK.

=== Suicide ===
6,045, 5,608 and 5,675 people aged 15 and over died by suicide across the UK each year from 2009 to 2011 respectively.

In 2022 there were 5,642 registered deaths by suicide in England and Wales specifically. In the same year there were 762 probable suicides in Scotland. In Northern Ireland there were 203 suicide deaths registered in 2022.

In 2023, there were 7,055 deaths in the UK officially registered as suicide, the highest suicide rate in the UK since 1999.

Suicide is the biggest killer of men under the age of 50 in the UK.

== Mental health treatment ==
In the UK, Child and Adolescent Mental Health Services (CAMHS) provide mental health care for people under the age of 18 who have difficulties with their emotional well-being or are deemed to have persistent behavioural problems. CAMHS offer children, young people and their families access to support for mental health issues from third sector (charity) organisations, school-based counselling, primary care as well as specialist mental health services. The exact services provided may vary, reflecting commissioning and providing arrangements agreed at local level. CAMHS operate in four-tier framework. Tiers 1 offers universal mental health services with the aim of prevention. Tier 2 provides early help and more targeted care by professionals specialised in mental health. Tier 3 covers specialist CAMHS that offer service for more severe disorders. Tier 4 is for children and young people with serious problems and care takes place in day and inpatient units.

=== England ===
The numbers of patients attending accident and emergency departments due to psychiatric problems rose by 50% between 2011 and 2016 and reached 165,000 in that year, amounting to as many as 10% of A&E visits in some trusts. There were calls in 2017 for increased provision of in patient psychiatric services and community psychiatric services. A&E is stressful and far from ideal for people in a mental health crisis but many patients in mental distress, some suicidal have nowhere else to go. In some areas of England, people experiencing a mental health crisis may now receive short-term care at a psychiatric decision unit as an alternative to an extended wait at an emergency department or being admitted to a psychiatric hospital. The new units assess the severity of the crisis and may offer therapy; they signpost and refer people to other services. However, as of 2019, units are rare, they often do not reduce emergency department visits or psychiatric admissions and generally cost more to run than the savings they generate in the short term.

Some mental health services have increased but many have been cut. 40% of mental health trusts have seen their budget reduced. Marjorie Wallace of mental health charity Sane, said "cuts to services across the country continue and people seeking help are still being failed".

In December 2019 the Voluntary Organisations Disability Group reported that 2,250 people with special needs were detained in long-stay NHS accommodation. 463 had been there for more than five years and 355 for more than 10 years. Effective provision of care in the community appeared a remote prospect for these patients.

The number of NHS mental health hospital beds fell by 25% between 2011 and 2021. There were 23,447 consultant-led mental health beds in 2011 and 17,610 in 2021.

==== Children and adolescents ====
In 2019 it was reported that many children with autism in England were waiting 137 days or more following referral for a diagnosis, against a target of 91 days. In 2021 children with mental health needs faced very long delays before receiving treatment. 51% waited under four weeks, 29% waited four to twelve weeks, 20% waited over twelve weeks. Some children with mental health problems had to go to A&E because a crisis developed while they were waiting. Some children were admitted to inappropriate adult wards through lack of room on children's wards.

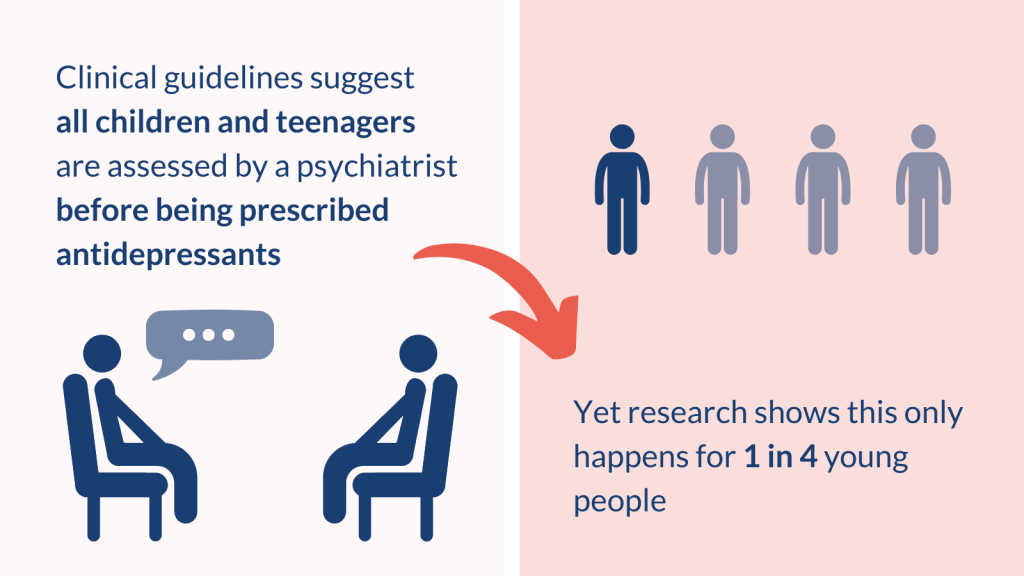
Most children and teenagers in the UK are prescribed antidepressants by their GPs without assessment by a psychiatrist.

According to National Institute for Health and Care Excellence (NICE) guidelines, antidepressants for children and adolescents with depression and obsessive compulsive disorder (OCD) should be prescribed together with therapy and after being assessed by a child and adolescent psychiatrist. However, between 2006 and 2017, only 1 in 4 of 12-17 year olds who were prescribed an SSRI by their GP had seen a specialist psychiatrist and 1 in 6 has seen a paediatrician. Half of these prescriptions were for depression and 16% for anxiety, the latter not being licensed for treatment with antidepressants. Among the suggested possible reasons why GPs are not following the guidelines are the difficulties of accessing talking therapies, long waiting lists and the urgency of treatment. According to some researchers, strict adherence to treatment guidelines would limit access to effective medication for young people with mental health problems.

=== Medical restraints in the UK ===
The Millfields Charter is an electronic charter which promotes an end to the teaching to frontline healthcare staff of all prone (face down) restraint holds. Organisations opposed to restraints include Mind and Rethink Mental Illness. YoungMinds and Agenda claim restraints are "frightening and humiliating" and "re-traumatises" patients, especially women and girls who have previously been victims of physical and/or sexual abuse. In June 2013 the UK government announced that it was considering a ban on the use of face-down restraint in English mental health hospitals. They are particularly opposed to face-down restraints, which are used disproportionately on female patients.

=== Regulation ===
Mental health treatment is regulated in England and Wales by the Mental Health Act 1983 (amended by Mental Health Act 2007) and the Mental Capacity Act 2005, in Scotland by the Mental Health (Care and Treatment) (Scotland) Act 2003, and in Northern Ireland by the Mental Health (Northern Ireland) Order 1986, which has been amended by the Mental Health (Amendment) (Northern Ireland) Order 2004. In England, legislation includes the power to admit those accused of crimes to be detained as restricted patients if certain conditions are met.

== Proposals ==
NHS Improvement began plans to help trusts in England integrate mental and physical health care in June 2017. Claire Murdoch said that more than 10,000 staff would be required to deliver the promised service improvements.

== History ==
The Madhouses Act 1774 was the first legislation in the United Kingdom addressing mental health. Privately funded lunatic asylums were widely established during the nineteenth century. The County Asylums Act 1808 permitted, but did not compel, Justices of the Peace to provide establishments for the care of "pauper lunatics", so that they could be removed from workhouses and prisons. The Lunacy Act 1845 established the Board of Commissioners in Lunacy. Justices were required to build lunatic asylums financed by the local rates.

In 1859, there were about 36,000 people classified as lunatics in all forms of care in England and Wales. About 31,000 were classed as paupers and 5,000 were private patients. Over 17,000 of the paupers were in county asylums or on contract in licensed houses, about 7,000 were in workhouses, while a similar number were living 'with friends or elsewhere'. Ten per cent of workhouse infirmaries provided separate insane wards. The Lunacy Act 1862 permitted voluntary admission. Any person who had been a patient in any type of mental hospital during the previous five years could enter a licensed house as a voluntary boarder. The Lunacy Commissioners could remove lunatics from workhouses to county asylums, and the harmless chronic insane could be moved from the overcrowded asylums to the workhouses.

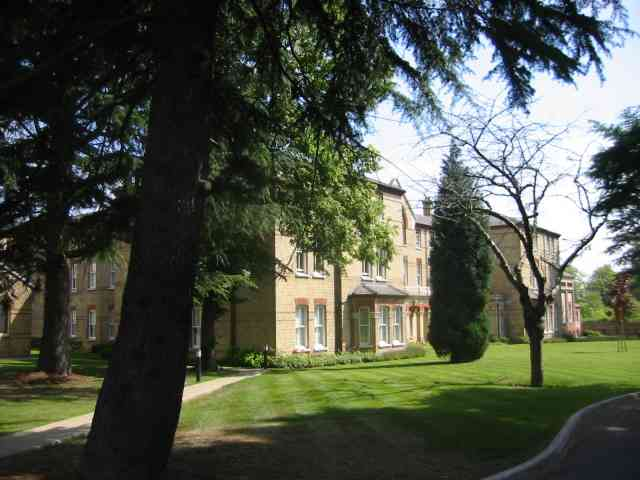
Leavesden Mental Hospital, near London

The Metropolitan Asylums Board, established by the Metropolitan Poor Act 1867 (30 & 31 Vict. c. 6) built two large asylums for London, Leavesden Mental Hospital and Caterham Asylum. They were built to similar designs by the same architect and each was intended to accommodate 1560 patients in six three-storey blocks for 860 females and five blocks for 700 males. They were both extended by around 500 places within five years. In 1870 there were about 46,500 poor law mental health cases: 25,500 in county asylums, 1,500 in registered establishments, 11,500 in workhouses and the remainder boarded out with relatives. In 1876, there were nearly 65,000 people classified as mentally disordered in England and Wales. It is not clear that there was actually an increase in the prevalence of mental illness.

From around 1870 there were moves to separate what was then called idiot children from adults. Darenth School for 500 children with learning disabilities was opened by the Metropolitan Asylums Board in 1878 and a separate institution next to the school, with accommodation for 1,000 adults, was opened in 1880. The Lunacy Act 1890 placed an obligation on local authorities to maintain institutions for the mentally ill. By 1938 131,000 patients were in local authority mental hospitals in England and Wales, and 13,000 in District Asylums in Scotland, where there were also seven Royal Mental Asylums. Mental hospitals were overcrowded and understaffed.

Mental health services were not integrated with physical health services when the NHS was established in 1948. Shortages of money, staff and buildings continued. Confederation of Health Service Employees organised an overtime ban in 1956, the first national industrial action in the NHS. Iain Macleod increased capital spending from 1954, hoping to increase bed numbers by 2,800. Rising numbers of patients, especially the elderly, caused a shift in policy away from institutions and towards day centres and community care.

In 1961 Enoch Powell, then Minister of Health, made his Water Tower Speech. He said "in fifteen years time there may well be needed not more than half as many places in hospitals for mental illness as there are today". This marked a shift towards Care in the Community, the British version of deinstitutionalisation, which was given further impetus by a series of scandals over long-stay hospitals from 1968 onwards.

In 1998, Child and Adolescent Mental Health Services (CAMHS) began to be established, taking over from an earlier multidisciplinary child guidance approach. Children, generally until school-leaving age, are supported by CAMHS organised locally often by local government area, operated by the NHS but jointly financed by the NHS and local government.

On World Mental Health Day 2018, the Prime Minister, Theresa May appointed Jackie Doyle-Price as the UK's first suicide prevention minister. This occurred while as the government hosted the first ever global mental health summit.

In September 2023, Labour Party leader Keir Starmer scrapped the position of mental health minister from his Shadow Cabinet. Rosena Allin-Khan, who formerly held the role in his cabinet, said that Starmer does "not see a space for a mental health portfolio in a Labour cabinet". The CEO of the British Association for Counselling and Psychotherapy (BCAP), Anna Daroy, responded saying that it, "shows a disappointing disregard for the nation's mental health and a worrying lack of foresight about one of the major issues facing the UK now and over the coming years, particularly among young people".

== See also ==
- Crisis cafe
- Effects of climate change on health in the United Kingdom
- Health in the United Kingdom
- Improving Access to Psychological Therapies
- List of asylums commissioned in England and Wales
- Mental Health Research UK
- Praxis Care
