= Improving Access to Psychological Therapies =

Improving Access to Psychological Therapies (IAPT), also known as NHS Talking Therapies, for anxiety and depression, is a National Health Service initiative to provide more psychotherapy to the general population in England. It was developed and introduced by the Labour Party as a result of economic evaluations by Professor Lord Richard Layard, based on new therapy guidelines from the National Institute for Health and Care Excellence as promoted by clinical psychologist David M. Clark.

== Aims ==
The aim of the project is to increase the provision of evidence-based treatments for common mental health conditions such as anxiety and depression by primary care organisations. This includes workforce planning to adequately train the mental health professionals required. This would be based on a 'stepped care' or triage model where 'low intensity' interventions or self-help would be provided to most people in the first instance and 'high intensity' interventions for more serious or complex conditions. Outcomes would be assessed by standardised questionnaires, where sufficiently high initial scores (a 'case') and sufficiently low scores immediately after treatment (below 'caseness'), would be classed as 'moving to recovery'. The NICE therapy guidelines presume reliable diagnosis. IAPT therapists do not make formal diagnoses. This calls into question IAPT's claimed fidelity to the NICE guidelines, particularly as it does not monitor therapists treatment adherence.

== Evaluation ==
Initial demonstration sites reported outcomes in line with predictions in terms of the number of people treated (especially with 'low intensity' interventions such as 'guided self-help') and the percentages classified as recovered and as in more employment (a small minority) to ten months later. It was noted that the literature indicates a substantial proportion of patients would recover anyway with the passage of time or with a placebo – in fact the majority of those whose condition had lasted for less than six months, but only a small minority of those whose condition had been longer-lasting.

There has been some debate over whether IAPT's roll-out may result initially in low quality therapy being offered by poorly trained practitioners.

Beacon UK benchmarked IAPT performance across England for 2011–12 and reported that 533,550 people accessed (were referred to) IAPT services – 8.7% of people suffering from anxiety and depression disorders – with around 60% entering treatment sessions. Most local IAPT services did not reach the target of a 50% 'recovery' rate.

In 2012–2013, 761,848 people were referred to IAPT services. 49% went into treatment (the rest either assessed as unsuitable for IAPT or declined), although around half of those dropped out before completing at least two sessions. Of the remainder, 127,060 people had pre-treatment and post-treatment mental health questionnaires submitted indicating 'recovery' – a headline rate of 43%. A report by the University of Chester indicated that sessions were costing three times more to fund than the original Department of Health estimates.

For 2014-15 there were nearly 1.3 million referrals to IAPT, of which 815,665 entered treatment. Of those, 37% completed sufficient sessions, with 180,300 showing a 'reliable recovery' (on anxiety and depression questionnaires completed before and immediately after treatment) – which was just over one in five of those who entered treatment, just under half of those who completed enough sessions. Opinion on IAPT remained divided. The number of trained IAPT therapists did not appear to have met the government's target of 6000, resulting in high caseloads. Some complained of seeing more 'revolving door' patients and excess complexity of cases, while the NHS has acknowledged problems with waiting times and recovery rates. However Norman Lamb, who championed IAPT within the coalition government 2010-2015, disagreed with picking faults with such an extensive and world-leading advance in evidence-based treatment. Others lauded the success in rising numbers of referrals, but warned of the failure to improve recovery rates. It was noted that both antidepressant prescribing and psychiatric disability claims have continued to rise.

In 2017 fewer than half of the Clinical Commissioning Groups met the target (15.8%) for the number of people who should be accessing talking therapies. There has been no publicly funded independent audit of IAPT . A study of 90 IAPT cases^{25} https://doi.org/10.1177/1359105318755264, [Scott (2018) IAPT - The Need for Radical Reform, Journal of Health Psychology, ] assessed with a 'gold standard' diagnostic interview revealed that only some recovered, in the sense of losing their diagnostic status. The results were identical whether or not the person was treated before or after personal injury litigation. Similarly, the use of the PHQ-9 in calculating recovery rates for treatment targets has been questioned considering the difficulty a significant minority of the population may have in understanding its content.

In July 2021 55,703 appointments out of the total 434,000 which went ahead involved one or more practitioners who did not have an accredited IAPT qualification. There are about 2000 psychological wellbeing practitioners in the service, with another 1,200 trainees. They are supported by high intensity therapists and counsellors of which there are about 4,000 with 700 trainees.

In 2022 less than 40% of people referred to IAPT services in some areas actually attended their initial assessment and first treatment sessions. Only 57% of people who attended for assessment went on to attend the first treatment appointment. People who self-referred were three times more likely to attend the assessment appointment than those who were referred by their GP.

== Updates ==
In December 2010, Paul Burstow, Minister for Care Services, announced an extension to the IAPT project to include Children and Young Peoples services. The government pledged £118m annually from 2015 to 2019 to increase access to psychological therapies services to children and young people.

When the programme officially started in 2008 it was only for working age adults, but in 2010 it was opened to all ages.

In 2015 Clark and fellow clinical psychologist Peter Fonagy, writing in response to wide-ranging criticism from child and adolescent psychiatrist Sami Timimi, stated that IAPT now has increasing support for the non-CBT modalities recommended by NICE for depression: counselling, couples therapy, interpersonal psychotherapy and brief psychodynamic therapy; and for Children and Young People (CYP-IAPT) more systemic family therapy, interpersonal therapy and parenting therapy is on the way. Timimi described the changes as still "light" on relational/collaborative therapy compared to the 'technical model' derived from 'eminence-based' NICE guidelines via inadequate diagnostic categories.

CYP-IAPT, an application of IAPT model for children and adolescents, was a government-supported initiative in the 2010s. Like its adult IAPT counterpart, CYP-IAPT aimed to improve the availability of, and access to, evidence-based psychological therapies. Unlike its adult counterpart, CYP-IAPT did not involve the recruitment and development of new types of workers; instead, it championed the training of existing staff in evidence-based therapies such as cognitive-behavioural therapy, parenting and interpersonal therapy.

A Payment by Results system is being developed for IAPT, whereby each local Clinical Commissioning Group can reward each local provider according to various targets met for the service and for each client – particularly for how much change in scores on the self-report questionnaires. The March 2021 issue of the British Journal of Clinical Psychology has highlighted the considerable controversy over IAPT's claims of success, Scott( 2021)^{26} https://dx.doi.org/10.1111%2Fbjc.12264 and Kellett et al., (2021)^{27} have responded with their own commentary ‘The costs and benefits of practice-based evidence: Correcting some misunderstandings about the 10-year meta-analysis of IAPT studies’

== History ==
Richard Layard, a labour economist at the London School of Economics, had become influential in New Labour party politics and was appointed to the House of Lords in 2000. He had a particular interest in the happiness of populations and mental health; his father, John Layard, was an anthropologist who had survived suicidal depression and retrained as a Jungian psychologist after undergoing psychoanalysis by Carl Jung. In 2003 Richard Layard met the clinical psychologist David M. Clark, a leading figure in cognitive behavioral therapy who was running the Centre for Anxiety Disorders and Trauma (with Anke Ehlers and Paul Salkovskis) at the Institute of Psychiatry and Maudsley Hospital. Clark professed to high rates of improvement from CBT but low availability of the therapy despite NICE guidelines now recommending it for several mental disorders.

Layard, with Clark's help, set about campaigning for a new national service for NICE-recommended treatments, particularly CBT. One key argument was that it would be cost-effective and indeed eventually pay for itself by increasing productivity and reducing state benefits such as Disability Living Allowance and Incapacity Benefit (which had seen rising claims since their introduction by John Major's Conservative Party in 1992 and 1995 respectively). The plan was accepted in principle by the newly re-elected Labour government in 2005 and gradually put into practice directed by Clark. Layard names several others as having helped gain the initial political traction for the initiative – MP Ed Miliband, psychiatrist Louis Appleby (then National Director for Mental Health), David Halpern (psychologist), psychiatrist David Nutt, MP Alan Milburn (married to a psychiatrist) and eventually the PM Gordon Brown.

In 2006 the Mental Health Policy Group at the LSE published 'The Depression Report', commonly referred to as the Layard Report, advocating for the expansion of psychotherapy on the NHS. This facilitated the development of IAPT initiatives, including two demonstration sites (pilot studies) and then training schemes for new types of psychological practitioner. The programme was officially announced in 2007 on World Mental Health Day. Some mental health professionals cast doubt on the claims early on. In the official publication of the British Psychological Society in 2009, experienced clinical psychologists John Marzillier and Professor John Hall strongly criticised IAPT's promoters for glossing over both the data gaps acknowledged in the NICE reports and the complexity of the multiple issues typically affecting people with mental health problems and their ability to sustain employment; they were met with much agreement as well as angry criticism. One researcher cited the UK initiative as the most impressive plan to disseminate stepped-care cognitive behaviour therapy. But the plan appears not to have worked, Davis (2020)^{28} in the Journal of Evidence Based Mental Health, noted that 73% of IAPT clients receive low intensity therapy first (guided self help, computer assisted CBT or group psychoeducation) but only 4% are transferred to high intensity therapy and the first transition appointment is the least well attended.

== See also ==
- Child and Adolescent Mental Health Services
- National Mental Health Development Unit
- Troubled Families

General:

- Mental health in the United Kingdom
