= Nacro =

Charity in England and Wales

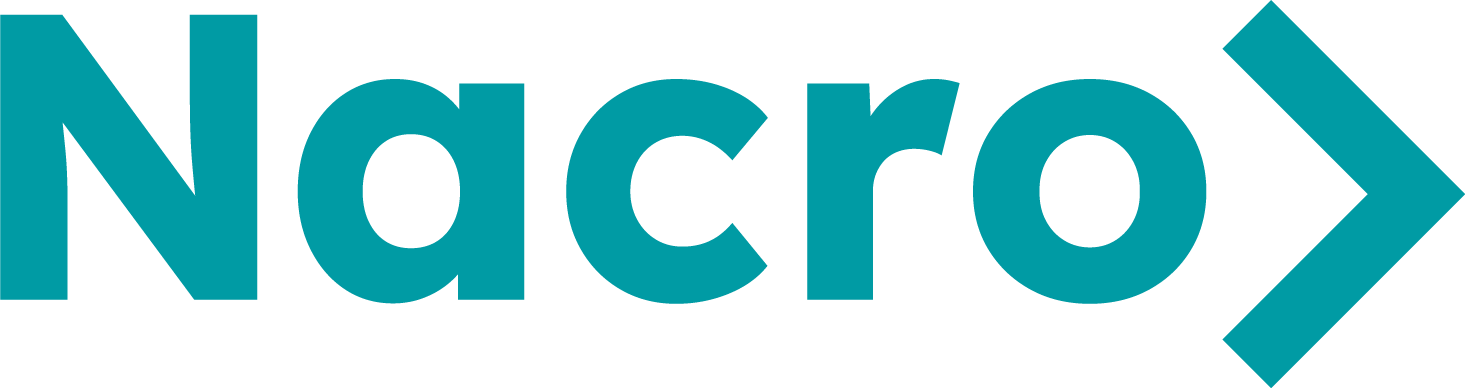
Nacro's logo

Nacro is a social justice charity based in England and Wales. Established in 1966 from the previous National Association of Discharged Prisoners’ Aid Societies, it became the largest criminal justice-related charity in England and Wales. In the 1970s Nacro also became involved in policy discussions with the British Government, particularly with the Home Office, which has responsibility for prisons and probation services. Since 2011, Nacro has expanded its policy and partnership work alongside its delivery of services.

Nacro provides services in housing, education, criminal justice, substance misuse recovery and advice across England and Wales.

== Services ==
Nacro provides services across England and Wales. Its activities include criminal justice, housing, education, advice services and public policy work.

=== Criminal Record Support Service ===
Nacro’s Criminal Record Support Service (previously known as Resettlement Advice Service or RAS) is a criminal record support and advice service, offering information and advice to individuals leaving prison and with current or previous convictions.

The service also provides training and consultancy to business, practitioners and employers on hiring people with criminal records.

=== Housing and housing support ===
Since 1966, Nacro has developed supported housing services, delivering housing solutions for people experiencing homelessness, prison leavers and others requiring housing support. This includes people that have experienced homelessness due to challenges in the housing market, prison leavers, and people who need extra support.

In June 2018, Nacro took over delivery of the Bail Accommodation and Support Service (BASS), later renamed the Community Accommodation Service (CAS-2) from Home Group, formerly Stonham Home Group. Commissioned by the Ministry of Justice, CAS-2 gives people who are eligible to be released from prison, or bailed from court, temporary accommodation and support for eligible people released from prison or granted bail.

In 2021 Nacro started running Lincolnshire NEST (Nacro Education Support and Transition), a specialised service providing accommodation with support to young people with complex needs or young families, aged 16 and 17, and care leavers up to 21, across Lincolnshire. Since then Nacro has started running other NEST services in Essex and London.

=== Nacro Education Centres ===
Nacro Education is rated Ofsted Good and provides pre-vocational, vocational and GCSE programmes, GCSE courses and employment preparation programmes for people aged 14–18 across 11 education centres in England, including Totton College.

Totton College also provide various apprenticeship programmes across Southampton, using their facilities for teaching practical lessons in hair and beauty, photography, music and more. The college also has a "Skills for Life" provision, providing specialist education for learners with additional educational needs.

=== Justice ===
Nacro operates in 28 prisons and the community, providing rehabilitation and resettlement services in prisons and community settings.

=== Health ===
Nacro delivers community-based contracts across substance misuse services. Its largest contract is in Wolverhampton, where it runs Recovery Near You, a drug and alcohol treatment service for young people and adults.

Nacro also manages Wolverhampton 360 (W360), a substance misuse service specifically for individuals under the age of 18.

== Campaigning ==
Over the years Nacro has undertaken public policy and campaigning work on issues relating to criminal justice, housing and education.

=== Cell Street Repeat ===
The Cell Street Repeat campaign was initially launched in 2020 with a focus on ending people leaving prison homeless. A joint letter was sent to the Prime Minister, Boris Johnson, and the Secretary of State for Justice, Robert Buckland, about accommodation for prison leavers and the Comprehensive Spending Review. The letter asked to review current policy, as leaving prison homeless reduced access to support, getting a job and somewhere to live. It also increased the chances of committing further crime.

=== Learn Without Limits ===
In 2021, Nacro launched the Learn Without Limits campaign. This campaign focused on supporting young people who have either faced an interrupted education throughout their lives or who come from the most disadvantaged backgrounds. Nacro asked the Government to look at the education and skills system as part of the post-COVID recovery effort.

== Officials and patrons ==
The Chief Executive is Enver Solomon OBE, and the Chair is Professor Nick Hardwick CBE. Nacro's patron is HRH The Princess Royal.
