= Mental Health Foundation =

British charitable organisation

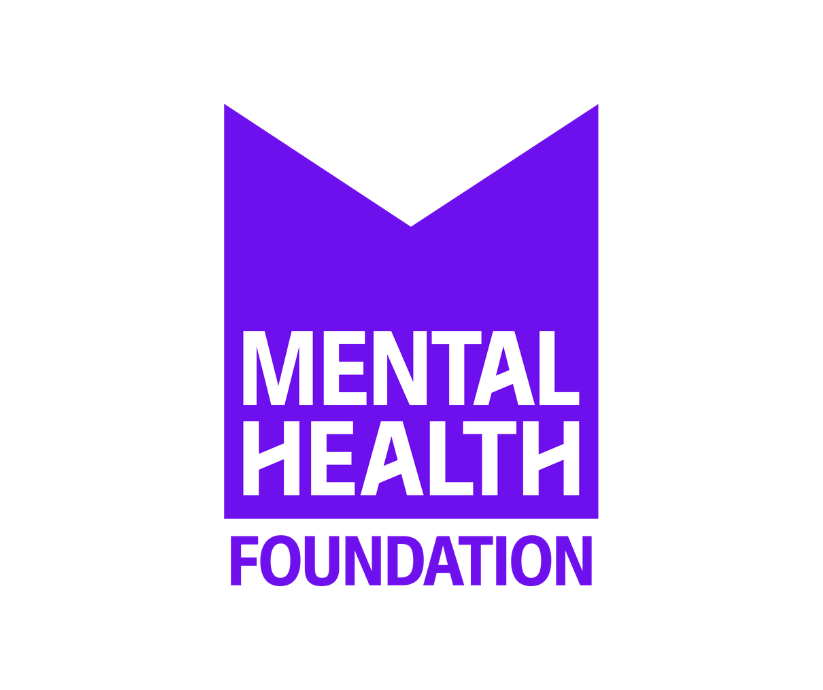
- Abbreviation: MHF
- Founded: 1949; 77 years ago
- Legal status: Charity
- Headquarters: Studio 2; 197 Long Lane; London; SE1 4PD
- Region served: United Kingdom
- Chief Executive: Adrian Lance
- Website: www.mentalhealth.org.uk
- Formerly called: Mental Health Research Fund

The Mental Health Foundation is a UK-based charity dedicated to promoting good mental health and addressing mental health issues.

Founded in 1949, the Foundation aims to help people understand, protect, and sustain their mental health through prevention, research, community programs, and advocacy.

The organisation is known for its annual Mental Health Awareness Week, which raises awareness and promotes action on mental health issues across the UK. By focusing on the root causes of mental health problems and advocating for policy changes, the Mental Health Foundation plays a significant role in improving mental wellbeing and reducing the stigma associated with mental health issues.

== History ==
The Mental Health Foundation was founded in 1949, as the Mental Health Research Fund, by Derek Richter, a neurochemist and director of research at Whitchurch Hospital. Richter enlisted the help of stockbroker Ian Henderson, who became the chair, while Victoria Cross recipient Geoffrey Vickers became chair of the research committee.

In 1972, the Mental Health Foundation took its current name, shifting its "focus away from laboratory research and towards working directly with—and learning from—people [who] experience mental health problems."

== Mental Health Awareness Week ==
Each year, for a week in May, the Mental Health Foundation leads Mental Health Awareness Week.

Mental Health Awareness Week was first held in 2001, and became one of the biggest mental health awareness events in the world.

=== Themes ===
Year	Themes
2013	Physical activity and wellbeing
2014	Anxiety
2015	Mindfulness
2016	Relationships
2017	Surviving or thriving?
2018	Stress: are we coping?
2019	Body image: how we think and feel about our bodies
2020	Kindness
2021	Nature and the environment
2022	Loneliness
2023	Anxiety
2024	Movement
2025	Community
2026	Action

== Green ribbon ==
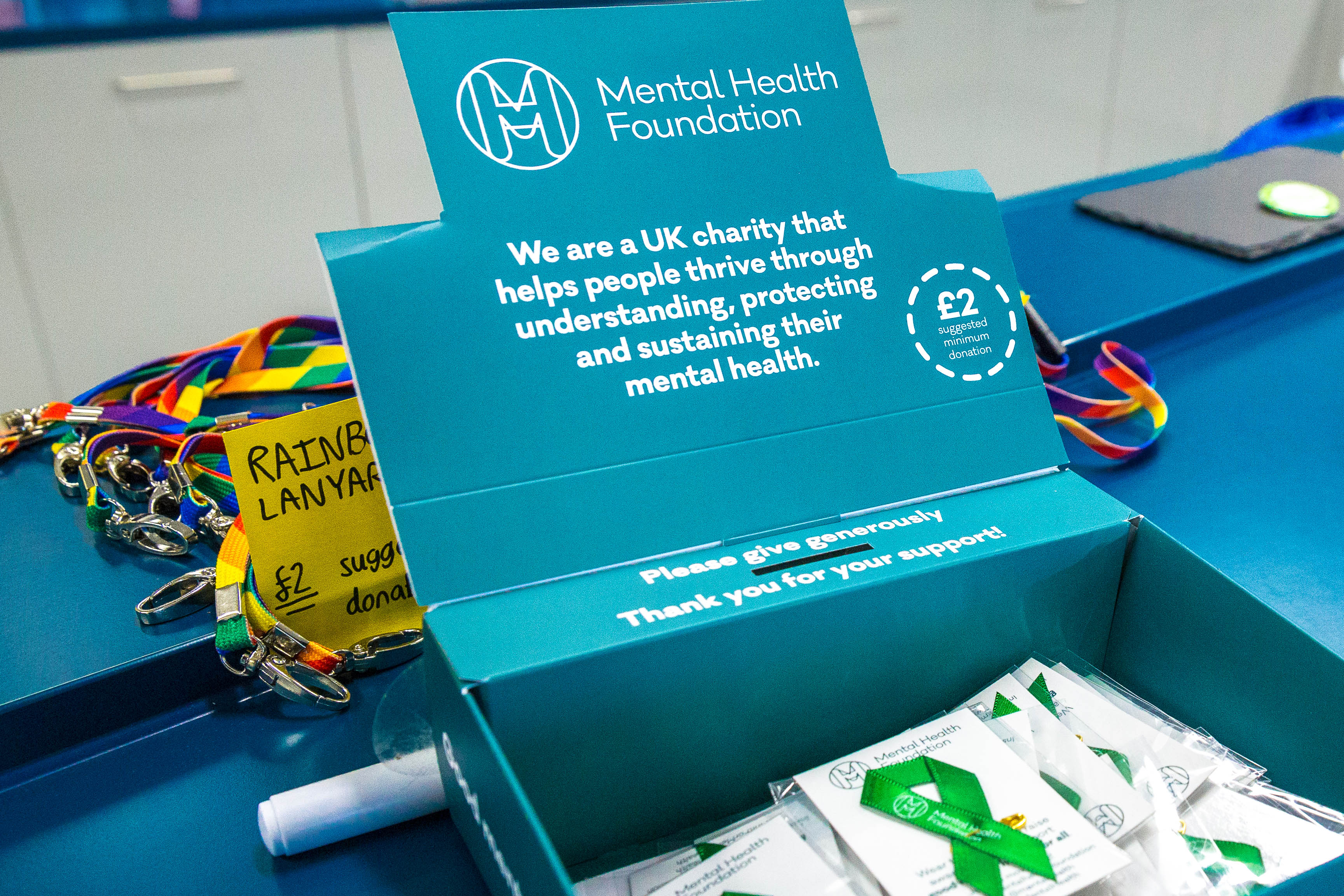
A Mental Health Foundation donation box with green ribbons

The green ribbon is the "international symbol for mental health awareness."

The Foundation's green ribbon ambassadors, have included: Gaby Roslin, Olly Alexander, Aisling Bea, Olivia Colman, Matt Haig, David Harewood, Melvin Odoom, Veronica Green, Nadiya Hussain, Grant Hutchison, Alex Lawther, Dr Ranj Singh, and Graham Norton.

The movement uses the hashtag #PinItForMentalHealth.

== Funding ==
The Foundation's total income for the financial year ending 31 March 2024 was £7.7m. The majority of this income comes from donations, legacies, and charitable activities.

== Organization ==
The Foundation is an incorporated UK charity headed by a board of 10 trustees. Dr Steve Workman was appointed chair of the board of trustees in 2026.

Helen Undy OBE is joining the Mental Health Foundation as its Chief Executive Officer in January 2027.

== See also ==
- Foundation for People with Learning Disabilities
- Mental health in the United Kingdom
