= Richmond Fellowship =

- Formation: 1959; 67 years ago
- Founder: Elly Jansen
- Defunct: 2024; 2 years ago
- Type: Charity
- Legal status: Merged with Humankind into Waythrough
- Purpose: Mental Health provision
- Headquarters: Highbury, London
- Region served: England
- Group Chair: Helen Edwards

Richmond Fellowship refers to a number of different charity, non-profit and voluntary sector providers of mental health services in England, the United States, Hong Kong and elsewhere. Established in 1959, as of 2009, it served over 6,000 people in England.

The institutions offer a range of support to people with mental health problems including supported accommodation, residential care, employment support and community based support, working with the NHS and local authorities to deliver services.

In June 2024, it was announced that Richmond Fellowship in England had completed the merger of its operations with those of Humankind. In October, the charitable organization created in the merger was named Waythrough.

== History ==
Richmond Fellowship was founded by Dutch theology student Elly Jansen in Richmond, Surrey, England shortly after the Mental Health Act 1959 was passed into law. The aim of the service was reintegrating people with mental ill health into the community despite long periods of time in hospital.

In 1973, Princess Alexandra became a patron of Richmond Fellowship and the organisation became a registered housing association in 1976. Richmond Fellowship played a significant role in hospital re-provision during the 1980s, providing new homes in the community for people across England. At this time Richmond Fellowship expanded its services for people with mental health problems including work schemes and day centres.

In 1974, a Richmond Fellowship incorporated as a not-for-profit company in Queensland, Australia. In 1975, the Richmond Fellowship opened a halfway house in Morriston, New Jersey. In 1985, the organization expanded to Hong Kong.

Throughout the 1990s, Richmond Fellowship grew and developed a widespread programme of mental health support including self contained flats, floating community support and 24-hour nursed care. It achieved Investors in People status in 1998.

Continued growth saw Richmond Fellowship adapt its mission to ‘Making Recovery Reality’ in 2006 to reassert its core values and better represent the holistic range of support it offers to people with mental health problems.

In October 2015 Richmond Fellowship joined a new national group of charities, Recovery Focus, which brought together organisations with strong individual services, innovative approaches, flexible local presence and a wide range of expertise from around England. The partnership is made up of mental health charities Richmond Fellowship, 2Care, Croftlands Trust and My Time along with substance misuse charities Aquarius and CAN.

In April 2016, Helen Edwards was appointed the new group Chair of Recovery Focus, the group which brings together a coalition of mental health and substance use charities such as Richmond Fellowship and Aquarius.

== Campaigns ==
Richmond Fellowship is an active member of Time to Change running awareness campaigns to tackle mental health stigma. Richmond Fellowship is also a supporter of the Mental Health Crisis Care Concordat and a member of the National Suicide Prevention Alliance.
