= List of Rubble & Crew episodes =

Rubble & Crew is a Canadian animated television series and a spin-off of Spin Master's Paw Patrol brand. Six seasons have been produced by Spin Master Entertainment, with animation provided by Jam Filled Toronto.

== Series overview ==
Season	Segments	Episodes	Originally released	
Season	Segments	Episodes	First released	Last released
1	49	26	January 29, 2023	March 5, 2024
2	49	26	March 6, 2024	March 18, 2025
3	23	13	March 19, 2025	December 11, 2025
4	25	13	October 10, 2025	May 7, 2026
5	23	13	May 11, 2026	TBA
6	TBA	13	October 12, 2026	TBA

== Episodes ==
=== Season 1 (2023–24) ===
No. overall	No. in season	Title	Written by	U.S. air date	Canadian air date	Prod. code	U.S. viewers (millions)
1	1	"The Crew Builds a Bridge"	Bradley Zweig	January 29, 2023 (sneak peek); February 3, 2023 (official) (Note: In the United States, a sneak peek of "The Crew Builds a Bridge" aired on December 25, 2022, during the NFL Nickmas Games halftime. The episode made an early premiere after a rerun of Minions on January 29, 2023, and its official premiere took place on February 3.)	February 4, 2023 (StackTV & Treehouse)	101	0.23
Ryder visits Rubble at his family reunion outside of Adventure Bay as they demonstrate their building skills to Ryder by building a gazebo. Upon Ryder being contacted by her, Mayor Goodway hooks Rubble up with her sister Mayor Greatway who needs a big construction work for Builder Cove. This project involves building a bridge that will lead the drivers into Builder Cove so that they can settle there as Rubble and his family have their first encounter with a construction worker named Speed Meister. Note: This is the 1st crossover episode.
2	2	"The Crew Builds a Big Bike Shop"	Eva Konstantopoulos	February 10, 2023 (Note: "The Crew Builds a Big Bike Shop" was first released on the Rubble & Crew YouTube channel on January 9, 2023.)	February 11, 2023	102	0.20
2	2	"The Crew Builds a Super Tub"	Drew Champion & Jacob Moffat	February 10, 2023	February 11, 2023	102	0.20
"The Crew Builds a Big Bike Shop": Today is the first ever Builder Cove Bike Day event. As Shopkeeper Shelley orders a resupply of big kid bikes for some of the kids, he asks Rubble & Crew to expand his bike shop. Speed Meister plans to do the job with building supplies stolen from Rubble & Crew which goes horribly awry when he gets trapped. Now Rubble & Crew must rescue Speed Meister and build the expansion to the bike shop the right way. "The Crew Builds a Super Tub": Rubble & Crew plan for the family photo. After Motor comes in contact with mud, Rubble & Crew plans to give her a bath as Motor refuses and considering it no fun. Rubble must lead his cousins into finding a construction solution so that Motor can enjoy taking a bath. They work on building an awesome super tub that would please Motor before their relatives come to their family photo.
3	3	"The Crew Builds an Ice Cream Shop"	Kellie R. Griffin	February 17, 2023	February 18, 2023	103	0.28
3	3	"The Crew Fixes a Squeak"	Evan Sinclair	February 17, 2023	February 18, 2023	103	0.28
"The Crew Builds an Ice Cream Shop": On a windy day, Rubble & Crew meet with Café Carl who states that he has a new ice cream flavor that he is going to unveil to everyone. Due to Café Carl operating out of his stand, Rubble leads his cousin in building Café Carl an ice cream shop complete with a giant ice cream cone on top. They must work to put together the ice cream shop while dealing with the strong winds. "The Crew Fixes a Squeak": Rubble & Crew is contacted by Mayor Greatway who needs to practice a big speech revolving around a big surprise. Unfortunately, there is a squeak in Builder Cove's town hall as Rubble and Charger head there to investigate. They trace the squeak to behind a wall and find a little mouse inside it. Once they get it out, Rubble and Charger find two more mice in different parts of Town Hall as they work to get them out before the big speech.
4	4	"The Crew Builds a Playground"	Hugh Duffy	February 24, 2023	February 25, 2023	104	0.28
4	4	"The Crew Fixes a Roof"	Robin J. Stein	February 24, 2023	February 25, 2023	104	0.28
"The Crew Builds a Playground": After fixing Grocer Gabriel's fence using the same parts with a different style, Rubble & Crew find a crowd that Auntie Crane and Motor are part of at the park. They find Speed Meister building a playground in the usual manner. Seeing how it is unsafe, Rubble & Crew due a safety check where Motor plays on the merry-go-round and she wrecks the playground until Rubble and his cousins save her. After a disastrous opening, Rubble & Crew salvage the playground parts and make it the most awesome playground ever as Speed Meister plans to sabotage it. "The Crew Fixes a Roof": Rubble & Crew have put together equipment for Mayor Greatway's Chili Cookaroo. Mayor Greatway's chili is described to be a good-tasting chili by Café Carl and Grocer Gabriel. As Mayor Greatway works on making a chili for the Chili Cookaroo, the roof ends up cracking causing her to call in Rubble & Crew. Rubble, Mix, Wheeler, and Charger go up to the roof of the town hall and find that a bald eagle named Wingsy has built a nest on her roof where she has laid three eggs. While Wheeler and Charger work to relocate Wingsy's nest, Rubble and Mix work to fix the roof before the Chili Cookaroo begins.
5	5	"The Crew Builds a Car Wash"	Dan Danko	March 10, 2023	March 18, 2023	105	0.20
5	5	"The Crew Plans Grandpa Day"	Scott Gray	March 10, 2023	March 18, 2023	105	0.20
"The Crew Builds a Car Wash": Mayor Greatway is planning on competing in Grocer Gabriel's first road race. Another competitor for this race is Speed Meister who sabotages Mayor Greatway's chances by getting mud on her motorcycle. Rubble & Crew works on building a car wash to clean Mayor Greatway's motorcycle. When Speed Meister sabotages the soap tank with mud and cement, Rubble & Crew works to work on upgrading the car wash to have the strength to wash off the mud and cement. "The Crew Plans Grandpa Day": During a windy day, Rubble & Crew plan Grandpa Day for Grandpa Gravel. As they plan to do different activities, each member gets called away one by one to help Grocer Gabriel when the wind wrecks the entrance of his grocery story when the Zesty Besty Cheddar goes on sale where Café Carl is among those in line to get the Zesty Besty Cheddar. Each one does their duty in fixing Grocer Gabriel's grocery store.
6	6	"The Crew Builds a Skatepark"	Christopher J. Gentile	March 31, 2023	April 1, 2023	106	0.18
6	6	"The Crew Builds a Tunnel"	Eva Konstantopoulos	March 31, 2023	April 1, 2023	106	0.18
"The Crew Builds a Skatepark": Mix leads the family in building a skateboard from the scraps they collected from the construction sites. Once that was done, Auntie Crane shows up and reveals that she is a skateboarding champion with Grandpa Gravel explaining this history. Rubble, Mix, Charger, and Wheeler build a surprise skate park for Auntie Crane as Grandpa Gravel and Motor work to keep her busy. They suffer a setback with the quick-drying cement when a duck family rescue ruins the skate park design. "The Crew Builds a Tunnel": Rubble learns that Charger is a fan of Sierra Sparkle who is going to have a concert in Builder Cove. In addition, Rubble & Crew learn that Grocer Gabriel is the father of Sierra Sparkle where she lives in a few towns over. He gets a call from Sierra who states that a falling giant boulder has blocked the road. Rubble & Crew head out to find a way to move the boulder. After each attempt to move the giant boulder fails even when Motor is called in and accidentally causes a landslide, Rubble & Crew work to build a tunnel by going through the rocks.
7	7	"The Crew Builds a Beaver Home"	Nahreen Tarzi	April 24, 2023	April 29, 2023	107	0.12
7	7	"The Crew Fixes a Road"	Drew Champion & Jacob Moffat	April 24, 2023	April 29, 2023	107	0.12
"The Crew Builds a Beaver Home": Rubble & Crew put together a dance floor for the family dance party. Once it is complete, the power goes out all over Builder Cove. That is because the utility poles have been stolen and Rubble & Crew discover that a beaver that they named Crunchy is responsible where he is trying to build a house from them. Mix pitches an idea to build a beaver home for Crunchy from material from the Bark Yard. "The Crew Fixes a Road": As Mayor Greatway rides her sidecar motorcycle, she comes across Rubble, Mix, and Grandpa Gravel helping Juniper repair her stop sign. After seeing Shopkeeper Shelley and Camilla helping out in Builder Cove, Mix supports Mayor Greatway's idea to start a special parade for helpers. Displeased that he was not invited because of his bad building skills not being any help, Speed Meister plans to help the community in his own sneaky way by damaging Main Street so that he can repair it only for his concrete mixture to cause a sinkhole. It is up to Rubble & Crew to rescue Speed Meister and fix the road the right way.
8	8	"The Crew Builds a Popcorn Café"	Ta'riq Fisher	May 12, 2023	May 13, 2023	108	0.15
8	8	"The Crew Fixes a Slippery Mess"	Scott Gray	May 12, 2023	May 13, 2023	108	0.15
"The Crew Build a Popcorn Café": During a hot day, Rubble & Crew are called in by Café Carl to help build a popcorn café with every popcorn flavor. Mix pitches an idea to build it in the shape of a popcorn box. They find that Café Carl had procured a large pot with all the kernels in town. While Café Carl goes to invite everyone in town, Rubble, Mix, Charger, and Wheeler build the popcorn café as the heat starts popping all the kernels in the pot which causes a mess around Builder Cove. They must work to build the roof and clean up the popcorn. "The Crew Fixes a Slippery Mess": While working on the Mega Mixer, an oil can spills during Wheeler's part of the job as Grandpa Gravel has Charger bring some sand to put over the spilled oil. Rubble & Crew are called in by Mayor Greatway who is preparing for Mayor Picture Day. To show off Mayor Greatway's daredevil personality, Rubble & Crew plan to build two giant ramps for Mayor Picture Day. Once that is done, Mayor Greatway accidentally drives over the drying paint causing Mix to make soap to clean up the ramp. Due to Wingsy pressing all the buttons, it causes a soapy mess that causes everyone to slip. Now Rubble & Crew must clean up the soap and rebuild the ramp.
9	9	"The Crew Builds a Drive-In Movie Theater"	Darnell Lamont Walker	May 19, 2023	May 20, 2023	109	0.14
9	9	"The Crew Finds a Rainbow Treasure"	Evan Sinclair	May 19, 2023	May 20, 2023	109	0.14
"The Crew Builds a Drive-In Movie Theater": Mix and Motor are big fans of the superhero cartoon Super Squirrelly Whirly. A call occurs on the Bark Screen where Mayor Greatway wants Rubble & Crew to build a movie theater to watch the new Super Squirrelly Whirly movie. After getting the supplies for the movie theater, Rubble, Mix, Charger, Wheeler, and Motor work on building a movie theater. Once it is done, Rubble & Crew receive a movie screen from Camila. Due to it being big enough to not fit in the movie theater, Mix gets the idea to convert it into a drive-in theater. "The Crew Finds a Rainbow Treasure": At the Bark Yard, Rubble can't find his wrench. Charger digs for it and finds a large gem that is the first clue to finding the Rainbow Treasure. After finding Rubble's wrench, Grandpa Gravel uses the Bark Screen to explain about the four triangle stones that will lead anyone to the Rainbow Treasure by sunset. Each one has a riddle that will lead them to the triangle stone. The riddles take Rubble & Crew to Tool Top Mountain, the park, and the lake. Though a setback occurs when ducks crossing the road break the gems in Wheeler's truck causing Grandpa Gravel to come up with a construction solution to fix them before the sun sets.
10	10	"The Crew Builds a Pig Barn"	Eva Konstantopoulos	May 26, 2023	May 27, 2023	110	0.19
10	10	"The Crew Builds a Giant Runway"	Peter Hunziker	May 26, 2023	May 27, 2023	110	0.19
"The Crew Builds a Pig Barn": While driving around Builder Cove, Rubble, Mix, Charger and Wheeler meet a first-time farmer named Farmer Zoe and her pig Truffles who have just moved to Builder Cove. She plans to have a pig party and invite everyone to it. Unfortunately, Farmer Zoe does not know how to build a pig barn. Rubble & Crew offer to build a pig barn for Truffles as Wheeler befriends her. While Farmer Zoe is away, Rubble & Crew proceed to build a pig barn. Once the pig barn is built, they must find Truffles when she disappears. "The Crew Builds a Giant Runway": Today is Motor's birthday party as they plan to throw it at the lake because of a present that Camila can only bring there. During the set-up, Camila contacts Rubble stating that she had to fly an airplane since Motor's gift is too big for her truck. Unfortunately, the runway at the local airport is too small. Now Rubble & Crew must construct a bigger runway while tearing up the smaller runway. They must put it together by the time Camila returns. By the time the sun sets, it is too dark for Camila to land causing Rubble & Crew to place special lights near the runway to light it up.
11	11	"The Crew and Marshall Build a Fire Station"	Bradley Zweig	July 31, 2023	August 5, 2023	111	N/A
Mayor Greatway enlists Rubble & Crew to help establish a fire station for Builder Cove where Camila is refurbishing a fire truck. Marshall arrives from Adventure Bay upon being called in to oversee the construction of the fire station where he will name someone a volunteer fire captain which Motor wants to become. Speed Meister plans to become a volunteer fire captain by sabotaging the fire station's garage door with cement. When a fire breaks out where Omar's family is hiking and Marshall's fire truck is trapped inside the garage, Rubble & Crew must use a constructive solution to put out the fire. Note: This is the 2nd crossover episode.
12	12	"The Crew Does a Home Renovation"	Evan Sinclair	August 1, 2023	August 12, 2023	112	N/A
12	12	"The Crew Builds a Lighthouse"	Scott Gray	August 1, 2023	August 12, 2023	112	N/A
"The Crew Does a Home Renovation": At the Bark Yard, Rubble and Mix watch the TV show "Hank Hammer, House Helper". He also announces that he will view a construction crew in action. Rubble and Mix then get a call from Shopkeeper Shelley who needs help with his house. When they start to work on Shopkeeper Shelley's house, Hank Hammer arrives to film Rubble and Mix in action. With Shopkeeper Shelley too busy to mention what needs work, they do random things like replacing the front door and fixing the windows until he remembers that he needs his house closer as Rubble enlists Charger and Wheeler for help in moving his house. "The Crew Builds a Lighthouse": As Rubble & Crew work on making the bridge into Builder Cove less bumpy, Mayor Greatway informs them that Mayor Goodway is visiting Builder Cove where Mr. Ducky Doo will be reunited with Chickaletta. As the asphalt into town is still wet, Rubble enlists Cap'n Turbot to bring Mayor Goodway to Builder Cove. Minutes later, Cap'n Turbot calls Rubble & Crew stating that it got foggy. As Builder Cove does not have a lighthouse, Rubble & Crew work on building a lighthouse. Due to a high tide causing the lighthouse to tip, Rubble & Crew must build a giant dog bowl to put the lighthouse in so that Cap'n Turbot can arrive with Mayor Goodway and Chickaletta safely. Note #1: This is the 3rd crossover episode. Note #2: This is the 1st crossover episode that is not a half-hour special.
13	13	"The Crew Builds a Dinosaur Museum"	Dan Danko	August 2, 2023	August 19, 2023	113	N/A
13	13	"The Crew Builds a Wheelchair Ramp"	Charity L. Miller	August 3, 2023	August 19, 2023	113	N/A
"The Crew Builds a Dinosaur Museum": As Rubble & Crew celebrate Family Picnic Day, Charger and Motor stumble upon a place to dig where they stumble upon a dinosaur skeleton of a Velociraptor. Rubble contacts Mayor Greatway who states that they need a special place to keep it. Rubble and Mix come up with the idea to build a dinosaur museum. While Wheeler and Charger dig up and clean the Velociraptor bones, the others build a dinosaur museum in Builder Cove. Rubble is later informed about the Stegosaurus skeleton and a Tyrannosaurus skeleton by Charger and Wheeler as Rubble, Mix, Motor, Auntie Crane, and Grandpa Gravel work to make the dinosaur museum bigger "The Crew Builds a Wheelchair Ramp": Mix wakes everyone up to celebrate her order of a new paint color. Omar plays basketball with his family before he can handle his mail carrier job and injures his ankle. Rubble and Mix head out to see if Omar is alright when he does not arrive in time as this also delays his other deliveries to Shopkeeper Shelley, Grocer Gabriel, and Mayor Greatway. Omar has to recuperate in a wheelchair which can not go up the stairs at Town Hall. Mix and Rubble plan to build a wheelchair ramp as they enlist Charger, Wheeler, and Motor to help out by replacing one of the stairs in front of City Hall. Then they take on the task to build wheelchair ramps for the other buildings in town, allowing Omar to deliver the rest of the packages.
14	14	"The Crew Builds a Splash Park"	Louise Moon	August 7, 2023	August 26, 2023	114	0.20
14	14	"The Crew Builds a Playroom"	Michaela Foster	August 8, 2023	August 26, 2023	114	0.19
"The Crew Builds a Splash Park": On the First Day of Summer, Rubble, Charger, Wheeler, Mix, and Motor work to keep cool in the heat. Mayor Greatway shows up at the Bark Yard where she needs Rubble & Crew to build something for the citizens to stay cool. They come up with the idea to build a splash park by an area of the beach that is too rocky for swimming. Rubble contacts Camila to bring a sea monster-type sprinkler for the splash park. With Camila's boat and the sea monster get stuck, Rubble & Crew must find a way to get settle the dilemma with the sprinkler and finish the splash park. "The Crew Builds a Playroom": Rubble & Crew get a call on the Bark Screen from Omar where he and Juniper want their help to put together a surprise playroom for Lucas and Lily. While Omar and Juniper take Lucas and Lily to the beach, Rubble, Mix, Charger, Wheeler, and Motor work on starting the playroom until a squirrel enters the shot and Motor's chasing of it spills the supplies which had to be cleaned up. After the wall is taken down, it causes the acorns from the tree to fall down causing the squirrel to cause different construction at each turn. Now Rubble & Crew must find a way to deal with the squirrel and complete the playroom before Omar's family returns.
15	15	"The Crew Builds a School"	Robin J. Stein	August 9, 2023	September 2, 2023	115	0.18
15	15	"The Crew Builds a Waterway"	Peter Hunziker	August 10, 2023	September 2, 2023	115	0.17
"The Crew Builds a School": Mayor Greatway arrives at the Bark Yard when she sees the art that Mix made and wants to teach an art class. Unfortunately, Mayor Greatway forgot to have a school built and she needs it done before the First day of school. As Rubble & Crew work on building the school, Mayor Greatway enlists Juniper to not let any kids near the area of the school until construction is complete. As Mix works to figure out what type of art she would teach, Rubble & Crew suffer a setback when they set off an underground stream and fills the hole which a family of ducks move in to. Now Rubble & Crew must come up with a construction solution as Mayor Greatway orders Juniper to continue stalling until construction is complete. "The Crew Builds a Waterway": Farmer Zoe is holding her first ever farmers' market. However, her lettuce crops are wilting as Rubble & Crew state that they will need a lot of water for it. Truffles helps them trace the nearest water supply to the river where Crunchy the Beaver lives. Rubble & Crew proceed to build a waterway there so that the water can go directly to Farmer Zoe's crops. When the waterway is built, it is tested on Farmer Zoe's crops. However, a complication occurs when Crunchy builds a dam to forward the water to his swimming pool. Now Rubble & Crew must work to have the water shared between Farmer Zoe and Crunchy before the farmers' market begins.
16	16	"The Crew Fixes a Haunted House"	Peter Hunziker	October 9, 2023 (Nick Jr.)	October 14, 2023	116	0.12
16	16	"The Crew Builds a Bat House"	Dan Danko	October 10, 2023 (Nickelodeon)	October 14, 2023	116	0.18
"The Crew Fixes a Haunted House": On Halloween, Rubble prepares his DJ Turntable for Builder Cove's first ever Halloween Party. Mayor Greatway calls in Rubble & Crew to have them fix an old house that is said to be a haunted house. Rubble, Charger, Wheeler, Mix, and Motor show up in their Halloween costumes where they work to given instructions to make the Halloween Party safe while fixing the stairs, the shutters, and the water pipes as well as contending with a possible ghost. "The Crew Builds a Bat House": The Bark Yard Fun Fall Day will be occurring soon. Unfortunately, there are bats sleeping beneath the Smash-Masher. To remedy this, Rubble leads his family into building a bat house in the forest. Upon arrival in the forest, Rubble & Crew work on building a bat house near some nice-smelling flowers. Once the bat house is built, Rubble and Motor work to draw the bats to the bat house with some flowers. Even after the bats are brought to the bat house, they find one baby bat left behind and now must get it to its family at the bat house.
17	17	"The Crew Builds an Observatory"	Lindsay Amer	August 21, 2023	September 9, 2023	117	0.20
17	17	"The Crew Builds a Zip Line"	Louise Moon	August 22, 2023	September 9, 2023	117	0.18
"The Crew Builds an Observatory": At the Bark Yard, Rubble, Charger, Wheeler, Mix, and Motor meet a new resident named River who photographs them and also shows them photographs of the things that Rubble & Crew built. As there is a shooting star tonight which River wants to photograph, Rubble & Crew plans to build an observatory on the top of Tool Top Mountain as Rubble enlists Camila to bring the biggest telescope to Tool Top Mountain. Once the things are procured, Rubble & Crew work to get to the top of Tool Top Mountain to build the observatory before nightfall while contending with the dropping cold temperatures. "The Crew Builds a Zip Line": Rubble, Mix, Charger, and Wheeler drive out to the forest where they meet Park Ranger Rose who takes them on a nature hike. While on the nature trail, Park Ranger Rose cautions them to stay on the trail and not to disrupt anything in nature as they plan to complete their hiking before sunset. They are soon followed by Crunchy the Beaver who ends up eating the suspension bridge. With the suspension bridge out of use, Rubble & Crew work on obtaining natural materials to make a zipline. Grandpa Gravel, Auntie Crane, and Motor are called in to help establish the zipline on the other side of the canyon.
18	18	"The Crew Builds a Library Tea Shop"	Jen Bardekoff	August 23, 2023	September 9, 2023	118	0.13
18	18	"The Crew Builds a Dance Floor"	Robin J. Stein	August 24, 2023	September 9, 2023	118	0.15
"The Crew Builds a Library Tea Shop": Grandpa Gravel hosts story time under a tree where he reads about King Pawthur as Café Carl takes part in hearing that story. When a new King Pawthur book is released, Grandpa Gravel states that they should construct Builder Cove's first library. Mix gets the idea to have it also double as a tea shop from Motor who was having tea with Auntie Crane. As Camila is enlisted to get the books and Café Carl gets the tea ingredients, Rubble & Crew work to build the library/tea shop around Grandpa Gravel's usual tree as they learn about trees from Park Ranger Rose. Amidst the construction, Rubble & Crew find a beehive filled with honey bees in the tree causing Rubble & Crew to come up with a construction solution to deal with the beehive with help from Park Ranger Rose. "The Crew Builds a Dance Floor": Rubble & Crew is building a dance floor for the Builder Cove Partner Boogie at the drive-thru theater. As Grandpa Gravel is an expert dancer, Charger asks him to teach him some dance moves upon entering the Builder Cove Partner Boogie. The sparkles from the disco ball attracts Wingsy who accidentally detaches the disco ball which rolls all over Builder Cove. Charger and Wheeler work to catch the runaway disco ball. Afterwards, Rubble & Crew work to rebuild the dance floor, install a new hook for the disco ball that is Wingsy-proof, and clean up the disco ball before the Builder Cove Partner Boogie begins.
19	19	"The Crew Builds a Giant Lemonade Stand"	Diana Aydin	December 5, 2023	September 16, 2023	119	0.10
19	19	"The Crew Builds a Wildlife Bridge"	Peter Hunziker	December 6, 2023	September 16, 2023	119	N/A
"The Crew Builds a Giant Lemonade Stand": Rubble & Crew come across Lucas and Lily selling lemonade. While Shopkeeper Shelley likes the lemonade, Speed Meister claims he does not as he tries to sell his lemonade which Shopkeeper Shelly considers sour. Rubble & Crew plans to build Lucas and Lily a lemonade stand shaped like a lemon. After building a badly built lemonade stand, Speed Meister plans to send his competition "rolling" with Mr. McTurtle providing a diversion. Now Rubble & Crew must catch the runaway lemon and get it back before its opening. "The Crew Builds a Wildlife Bridge": As Rubble & Crew and Park Ranger Rose observe Crunchy the Beaver in his habitat, they find him building a dam. While looking for more wood, Crunchy finds one across the road causing Rubble & Crew and Park Ranger Rose to briefly stop traffic so that Crunchy can cross the road safely as Juniper is enlisted to help Crunchy cross the road. Rubble & Crew comes up with a construction solution to help Crunchy cross the road easily by building a special wildlife bridge. Once that is done, they get advice from Park Ranger Rose on how to get Crunchy to cross the wildlife bridge by incorporating some of the forest onto it
20	20	"The Crew and Chase Are on the Case"	Evan Sinclair	December 4, 2023	December 9, 2023	120	0.16
At Town Hall, Mayor Greatway has announced that she is unveiling a special surprise. She has called in Chase to help Camila bring in a specific item safe and sound. The surprise in question is a statue of everyone in Builder Cove. Displeased of how his part of the statue did not come out right, Speed Meister plans to dispose of the statue with balloons so that he can make his own statue. When the statue floats away with Mr. McTurtle taken with it, Chase helps Rubble & Crew find the statue where he makes them detective helper pups that involves discovering clues and build a science center to solve the clues. Once the clues are solved, Chase and Rubble & Crew must locate the floating statue so that they can rescue it and Mr. McTurtle. Note: This is the 4th crossover episode.
21	21	"The Crew Fixes a Talent Show Stage"	Bradley Zweig	December 7, 2023	December 23, 2023	121	N/A
21	21	"The Crew Builds Instruments"	Franklin Young	December 11, 2023	December 23, 2023	121	N/A
"The Crew Fixes a Talent Show Stage": Grocer Gabriel is holding a talent show as Rubble, Motor, Mayor Greatway, Mr. Ducky Doo, and River sign up. As the stage is too small for the acts, Rubble and Motor plan to round up the rest of Rubble & Crew to build a larger stage as Motor plans to find a talent for the talent show. Speed Meister plans to sabotage their construction so that his magic act can be the only act to perform. He does this by posing as Mayor Greatway claiming that a pipe burst has occurred at town hall. Upon learning of the false alarm as Mayor Greatway had no knowledge of calling them, Rubble & Crew find Speed Meister's dome which doesn't go according to plan. Rubble ends up enlisting Motor to get him out. Afterwards, Rubble & Crew work on expanding the stage before the talent show begins. "The Crew Builds Instruments": On Builder Cove Day, Rubble & Crew set up for Town Hall for this celebration of Builder Cove's founding. Sierra Sparkle will be performing a special song. The Builder Cove Band consists of Shopkeeper Shelley, River, and Park Ranger Rose where they will be performing with Sierra Sparkle. Unfortunately, Charger's massive case of the Zoom Zoom Zoomies accidentally wrecks the stage and the decorations. Even after Charger uses his crane to lift the wreckage, the instruments are destroyed. Rubble & Crew comes up with a constructive solution to build new instruments and fix the stage before the Builder Cove Day party begins and Sierra Sparkle arrives.
22a	22a	"The Crew Builds a Christmas Show"	Bradley Zweig	November 29, 2023	December 2, 2023	124A	0.13
Rubble, Charger, Wheeler, and Mix are at Farmer Zoe's farm where Wheeler and Truffles are practicing for the first ever Christmas show in Builder Cove. It soon gets cold enough to freeze the mud. Rubble and Mix come up with a Christmas construction solution involving slippery smooth ice as Farmer Zoe pitches an idea for an ice skating rink. With help from Motor, Auntie Crane, and Grandpa Gravel, Rubble, Charger, and Mix make decorations for the Christmas show as Wheeler and Truffles work on some new ice skating moves. Once that is constructed, Wheeler is still stumped on the show until Grandpa Gravel gives him advice on what show he and Truffles can do.
22b	22b	"The Crew Builds a Giant Sled Ramp"	Scott Gray	November 30, 2023	December 2, 2023	124B	0.17
Rubble, Charger, Wheeler, and Mix show Lucas and Lily the super snow sleds that they will use to sled down Tooltop Mountain in light of the upcoming snow. The next day, they head to Tool Top Mountain to meet with Omar's family to give them the sleds only to find that there was no snow on Tool Top Mountain. Rubble and Mix come up with a construction solution that involves making a snowy sled slide at the Bark Yard that involves making their own batch of homemade snow. With help from Motor, Auntie Crane, and Grandpa Gravel, Rubble & Crew work to build a giant sled ramp and break up some ice to make the homemade snow with the Smash Masher and the Mega Mixer.
23a	23a	"The Crew Builds a Giant Dam"	Darnell Walker	December 12, 2023	December 30, 2023	122A	0.12
While using the Smash Master to break some rocks into gravel, a thunderstorm occurs, causing Rubble & Crew to flee to their doghouses. After the thunderstorm passes, Rubble & Crew are contacted by Mayor Greatway who informs them that the rain that has built up in the mountains and flowed into the canyon where it will flood Builder Cove. While Mayor Greatway suggests they put up some sandbags, Rubble, Charger, Wheeler, Mix, and Motor work to build a dam while Auntie Crane delivers some sandbags to everyone. With the river constantly rising, Rubble & Crew must work to make the dam even taller before the flash flood arrives.
23b	23b	"The Crew Builds a Squirrel-Proof Farm"	Nahreen Tarzi	December 13, 2023	December 30, 2023	122B	0.15
Rubble and Motor arrive at Farmer Zoe's farm to help set up for the farm fair. Unfortunately, some of the big crops are being targeted by a squirrel that Rubble and Motor try to chase after when the squirrel ate some of the big strawberries. Rubble comes up with an idea to build a fence to put around the crops to keep the squirrel out. The squirrel gets over the crops and eats some big blueberries causing Rubble and Motor to upgrade the fence to a perimeter fence with a special top for the squirrel to not get over. Unfortunately, the squirrel digs under the fence and eats some big corn. To protect the giant watermelon, Rubble enlists Mix to paint Motor's wrecking ball to look like the watermelon as they build a special case to protect the watermelon with Motor providing the diversion. Note: When this episode aired on Milkshake! in the UK, there is an error as this shows the title card of "The Crew Builds a Giant Dam" and then show the title card of "The Crew Builds a Squirrel-Proof Farm".
24a	24a	"The Crew Builds a Fountain Show"	Drew Champion & Jacob Moffat	February 26, 2024	March 2, 2024	123A	0.13
Charger tells his family about the new song about Sierra Sparkle called "Enjoy the Ride". Rubble & Crew are contacted by Grocer Gabriel who states that Sierra Sparkle needs their help where they must make a special stage for her performance. Mix pitches an idea to make sparkly stars and a confetti finale. Rubble, Charger, Wheeler, and Mix head to the stage and get to work on it. A dilemma occurs during the digging part when underground water is unleashed. After the pipes are put in, the water has ruined most of the building supplies which leads to them using the water and the remaining building supplies to make extra special in the form of a fountain show.
24b	24b	"The Crew Builds a Carousel"	Kellie Griffin	February 27, 2024	March 2, 2024	123B	0.09
Grocer Gabriel prepares to display an assortment of peanut butter, almond butter, sunflower butter, cashew butter, hazelnut butter, grape jelly, strawberry jelly, mixed berry jelly, and apricot jelly as part of PB&J Day. To help keep the crowd from killing time while setting up all the butters and jellies, Grocer Gabriel has enlisted Rubble & Crew to construct something outside the store. They bring to him a mechanical horse to keep everyone busy while Grocer Gabriel finishes setting up for PB&J Day. When enticed by Lily to try the mechanical horse, Grocer Gabriel accidentally spills the jelly he was holding at the time into the joins. After they rescue Grocer Gabriel from the runaway mechanical horse, Rubble & Crew get an idea to build a carousel to entertain the crowd.
25a	25a	"The Crew Builds a Parking Garage"	Eva Konstantopoulos	February 28, 2024	March 9, 2024	125A	0.09
Rubble, Charger, Wheeler, and Mix visit Café Carl's ice cream shop where he shows the Super Sundae Scooper that makes any type of sundae. In addition, he plans to make Kibble Krunch for the Rubble & Crew. As River spreads the word throughout Builder Cove to Omar's family, Mayor Greatway, and other civilians as well as a few nearby towns, the number of customers causes an "ice cream traffic jam". To find a place for everyone to park their cars, Rubble & Crew work to build a parking lot nearby with help from Motor. Due to a large number of cars, Rubble & Crew work to convert the parking lot into a special parking garage upon being inspired by the Super Sundae Scooper as a car carousel.
25b	25b	"The Crew Builds a Campsite"	Peter Hunziker	February 29, 2024	March 9, 2024	125B	0.13
Rubble & Crew are preparing to go on a camping trip with Park Ranger Rose. Unfortunately, Park Ranger Rose shows up to tell them that the camping trip has been cancelled because of the rains that ruined the Tooltop Mountain campsite. Rubble & Crew works to establish a campsite at the Bark Yard. Once that is done, Park Ranger Rose make plans involving having Grandpa Gravel's chili, going on a nature hike, and roasting marshmallows around the campfire under the dark night sky. As Rubble has a fear of the dark, Park Ranger Rose claims that her nature app will have the moon and stars with different clouds appearing at different points to block them. When it comes to the part of making marshmallows, more clouds keep blocking the Moon causing Charger, Wheeler, and Mix to build their own Moon and stars that have glow-in-the-dark paint applied to them.
26a	26a	"The Crew Builds a Treehouse"	Christopher J. Gentile	March 4, 2024	March 16, 2024	126A	0.12
Park Ranger Rose talks about her favorite oak tree to Lucas and Lily which is 100 years old as she tries to show them how she climbs it until one of the branches breaks it. She calls in Rubble & Crew to help deal with the old branches. As everyone else is busy cleaning their tools, Rubble enlists Grandpa Gravel to work on cutting down the old tree. With the branches growing back in a year as stated by Park Ranger Rose to Lucas and Lily, Rubble and Grandpa Gravel come up with a plan to make the oak tree turning into a tree house. When Charger, Wheeler, and Mix are enlisted to help with the construction of the tree house, Charger finds that he forgot his drill when it comes to drilling in the screws on the floorboard causing Grandpa Gravel to improvise with a crank that he refurbished earlier.
26b	26b	"The Crew Builds a Chicken Feeder"	Evan Sinclair	March 5, 2024	March 16, 2024	126B	0.17
Rubble, Charger, Wheeler, and Mix arrive at Farmer Zoe's farm where she has now obtained chickens named Lenny, Benny, and Jenny. As Farmer Zoe has enlisted Wheeler to bring some seeds to feed them, Rubble gets the idea to build a chicken feeder. They get delayed from emergency calls by Shopkeeper Shelley and Juniper to handle a broken sidewalk and a downed tree respectively. Because the seeds are leaking from Wheeler's dump truck, Lenny, Benny, and Jenny follow them to their jobs where they get separated. When Farmer Zoe states that Lenny, Benny, and Jenny are missing after Rubble & Crew had the downed tree recycled by Grandpa Gravel, Rubble and Charger work to find the chickens while Wheeler and Mix work to build a chicken feeder.

=== Season 2 (2024–25) ===
No. overall	No. in season	Title	Written by	U.S. air date	Canadian air date	Prod. code	U.S. viewers (millions)
27a	1a	"The Crew Builds a Roller Coaster"	Bradley Zweig	March 6, 2024	May 18, 2024	201A	0.16
At the beach, Mayor Greatway and Speed Meister are allowing Mr. Ducky-Doo and Mr. McTurtle to have a playdate together. Speed Meister plans to make something fast for both their animal companions to enjoy only for Mayor Greatway to call in Rubble & Crew to make a fast ride. Rubble & Crew get the idea to build a roller coaster. When Speed Meister plans to build a roller coaster first, he does his own version of a safety check when he ends up being unsafe and sending Mr. Ducky-Doo and Mr. McTurtle riding out of control throughout town, causing Rubble & Crew to save them. Afterwards, Rubble & Crew works to build a roller coaster the right way and doing a proper safety check.
27b	1b	"The Crew Builds Motor a Play Space"	Eva Konstantopoulos	March 7, 2024	May 18, 2024	201B	N/A
At the Bark Yard, Rubble & Crew works to get everything cleaned and ready for Inspector Inez to do an inspection. If they pass the inspection, they will get a golden star. Unfortunately, Motor is doing a lot of smashing with her sledgehammer. Rubble & Crew enlist Builder Cove's latest resident Coach Karima to keep Motor busy in a non-messy way. They play a game of balloons until Motor starts to smash them. No matter what game Coach Karima comes up with, Motor keeps smashing things repetitively. Eventually, Rubble & Crew get the idea to build a special play space out of the magnets and springs that would also clean itself up.
28a	2a	"The Crew Builds a Train Station"	Robin J. Stein	May 20, 2024	May 25, 2024	202A	0.10
Rubble, Charger, Wheeler, and Mix arrive at Farmer Zoe's farm when they hear that she is getting a new animal. They learn that Farmer Zoe is getting a cow named Mooreen. Camila is bringing Mooreen by train. Unfortunately, she does not know how she would get her down from the train. Rubble comes up with an idea to build a train station near the train tracks outside of Builder Cove that gets themed after farm animals. It will also be customized with special stairs that Mooreen would go down. In addition, Mix suggests that the train station should be modeled after farm animals. Once the train station is complete, Mooreen won't go down the stairs causing Rubble & Crew to replace it with a ramp. They must complete the ramp and get Mooreen to go down it before Camila's ice cream shipment for Café Carl melts.
28b	2b	"The Crew Builds a Sierra Sparkle Sign"	Blake Peckins	May 21, 2024	May 25, 2024	202B	N/A
Rubble, Charger, Wheeler, and Mix are summoned by Grocer Gabriel who informs them that Sierra Sparkle is coming to Builder Cove to live with him. To make Sierra Sparkle feel at home, Mix gets the idea to make a large sign that Sierra Sparkle is on it and place it on the bridge outside of Builder Cove. Speed Meister plans to build a bigger and better sign of himself. Rubble & Crew are informed of what Speed Meister is doing by the bridge by Grocer Gabriel. When Speed Meister's sign ends up running loose in Builder Cove, Rubble & Crew must work to corral the runaway sign while restoring everything in its path before they can build a sign for Sierra Sparkle by the time she arrives at sunset.
29a	3a	"The Crew Builds a Mini Golf Course"	Diana Aydin	May 22, 2024	June 1, 2024	203A	N/A
During the first day of Spring, Rubble & Crew run into Coach Karima who has soccer balls in her possession as part of the outdoor sports as well as establishing a soccer camp. This leads Rubble & Crew to work on a soccer field in the park. When the soccer field is established, Rubble & Crew reach a complication in the form of rabbit holes as the rabbits keep making off with the soccer balls. Seeing that the rabbits want to play with them, Coach Karima states that they should play a game related to mini-golf called Bunny Ball as Mix gets an idea to make a special miniature golf for both humans and rabbits that is modeled after everything that Rubble & Crew has built in Builder Cove.
29b	3b	"The Crew Builds a Butterfly Garden"	Denise Downer	May 23, 2024	June 1, 2024	203B	N/A
While playing fetch in the park, Rubble, Charger, Wheeler, Mix, and Motor stop their game when Park Ranger Rose sees some butterflies of different colors nearby as part of migration. As Charger mentions that the butterflies do not have a park of their own, Park Ranger Rose shows them a picture of a butterfly garden. Upon Auntie Crane bringing the supplies for the butterfly garden, Rubble & Crew work on building a butterfly garden that also involves procuring flowers from Shopkeeper Shelly's flower shop. Once the butterfly garden is complete, Motor can't find the blue butterfly that she has been chasing when all the other butterflies show up causing Rubble & Crew to come up with a construction solution to bring the blue butterfly to the butterfly garden.
30a	4a	"The Crew Builds Library Treasure Tunnels"	Angela M. Sánchez	May 27, 2024	June 8, 2024	204A	N/A
After Grandpa Gravel reads the latest King Pawthur book to Rubble, Charger, Wheeler, Mix, and Motor head to the library tea shop where they already read all of the King Pawthur books. Café Carl states that the new King Pawthur books are coming today. Unfortunately, all the shelves are filled causing Rubble & Crew to build some new bookshelves. Because there is a whole truckload of books is being delivered by Camila, they can not go taller without disrupting the bees after getting an opinion from Park Ranger Rose. Inspired by one of the books called "King Pawthur and the Treasure Tunnels", Rubble & Crew build some library tunnels complete with a motorized slide so that the new books will go there.
30b	4b	"The Crew Builds a Super Snack Dispenser"	Michaela Foster	May 28, 2024	June 8, 2024	204B	N/A
At the Bark Yard, Rubble was about to try Grandpa Gravel's new kibble dish when Rubble & Crew gets a call from Shopkeeper Shelly who needs the front door to his bike shop fixed. As Rubble heads out to fix Shopkeeper Shelly's door, the others work to find a way to keep Grandpa Gravel's kibble dish. Mix gets the idea to build a snack dispenser. Once it is complete, the snack dispenser is put in Rubble's doghouse. Due to Grandpa Gravel's additional kibble dishes, Charger, Wheeler, and Mix call Shopkeeper Shelley to keep Rubble busy so that they can make the snack dispenser bigger.
31a	5a	"The Crew Builds a Hair Salon"	Gillian Pike	May 29, 2024	June 15, 2024	205A	N/A
Grandpa Gravel is preparing a new kibble recipe. Rubble & Crew gets a call from Shopkeeper Shelley who wants to open a hair salon for humans and pups after getting a large shipment of shampoo. Mayor Greatway gives Grandpa Gravel the Builder Cove's Best Baker award. Due to Grandpa Gravel being messy from baking, Rubble & Crew work on building the hair salon near a cherry tree so that Grandpa Gravel can get cleaned up for the photo to go with his award. Once it is completed, Grandpa Gravel becomes the first customer as his fur ends up pink. Rubble & Crew look to find the source of Grandpa Gravel's fur being colored pink and find it caused by a squirrel storing its cherries in the shampoo container, causing Rubble & Crew to come up with a construction solution while trying not to chase the squirrel.
31b	5b	"The Crew Builds a Colorful Crystal Show"	Teresa Lee	May 30, 2024	June 15, 2024	205B	N/A
Park Ranger Rose takes Rubble, Charger, Wheeler, Mix, Motor, and Lily to the beach to look for some discovery that would be important to be on display at the dinosaur museum. During the dig, Lily finds a sparkling rock which Park Ranger Rose has Motor break open. They find some purple crystals inside causing everyone to find more similar rocks with different colored crystals in it as the sunlight enables them to sparkle. Mix gets the idea to bring the crystals to the dinosaur museum for a colorful crystal show with help from the sunlight. When the crystal display is set up, the sun gets blocked by the clouds causing Rubble & Crew to relocate the crystal display inside where there are more lights.
32	6	"The Crew and Skye Build a Mountain Lodge"	Story by : Evan Sinclair; Teleplay by : Hugh Duffy	August 5, 2024	August 10, 2024	210	N/A
At the Bark Yard, Rubble & Crew are having lunch when the Bark Screen goes off. They get a call from Park Ranger Rose and Omar's family who are on a hike on Wagtail Mountain. As it will be dark soon and Omar's family do not have their camping supplies with them, Park Ranger Rose informs them that there are no roads on Wagtail Mountain as Mix gets the idea for Rubble & Crew to build a mountain lodge complete with its amenities. As they can not deliver by driving, Rubble enlists the aid of Skye to fly it up to Wagtail Mountain once it is complete. In addition, they also add a helipad when they needed someplace for Skye to land her helicopter. Meanwhile, Speed Meister plans to hijack the mountain lodge after failing to build one of his own and makes his own helicopter attachment in his own vehicle with disastrous results. Note: This is the 5th crossover episode.
33	7	"The Crew Builds a Gym"	Diana Aydin	August 6, 2024	August 17, 2024	206	N/A
33	7	"The Crew Puts on a Construction Show"	Angela M. Sánchez	August 6, 2024	August 17, 2024	206	N/A
"The Crew Builds a Gym": At the Bark Yard, Rubble, Mix, Charger, and Wheeler see Motor running around before jumping into her ball pit. The Bark Screen goes off as Rubble & Crew gets a call from Coach Karima who states that she has been teaching Lucas and Lily gymnastics and needs them to build a gym while having enlisting Camila to pick up the gym equipment. Mix gets the idea to build an outdoor gym for the gymnastic showcase. When it is constructed, Camila arrives with the gym equipment. However, the balance beam for Lily's gymnastic routine is too high for her causing Rubble & Crew to come up with a construction solution to rectify this by setting up a ball pit on the other end of it using Motor's extra balls. "The Crew Puts on a Construction Show": At the Bark Yard, Grandpa Gravel has made construction kibble cakes for everyone. Auntie Crane informs her family that the High-Flying Howards are coming to Builder Cove and are the reason that Auntie Crane took up skateboarding. She states that Mayor Greatway wants Rubble & Crew to set up the bleachers in the park. Upon arrival in the park, Mayor Greatway gets a call from the High-Flying Howards have stubbed their toes causing Auntie Crane to feel sad. Mix and Charger get the idea to put on their own construction show for Auntie Crane. While Grandpa Gravel works on making construction kibble cakes and Mayor Greatway being informed about it, Rubble & Crew work on building the construction show as they work on deciding on what their big finish will be.
34a	8a	"The Crew Builds Charger a Super Bed"	Teresa Lee	August 7, 2024	August 24, 2024	207A	N/A
As nighttime approaches at the Bark Yard, Rubble & Crew are prepared to go to sleep after their recent building activity as Grandpa Gravel leads them into getting ready for bedtime. When it comes time to go to sleep, Grandpa Gravel gives everyone goodnight scratches until he learns that Charger is unable to go to sleep due to a large amount of energy. After the advice of counting wrenches fail, Charger still hasn't fallen asleep and is keeping everyone out. To get Charger's remaining energy out, Mix starts with a suggestion for an obstacle course for Charger to burn off his energies which partially works. When it is discovered that Charger gets calm & relaxed to the sounds of construction sounds to sleep, Rubble & Crew work to build a special super bed for Charger that can play construction sounds.
34b	8b	"The Crew Builds a Super Squirrelly Whirly Playground"	Blake Pickens	August 8, 2024	August 24, 2024	207B	N/A
At the Bark Yard, Mix and Motor play a game of Super Squirrelly Whirly since they could not do it last night due to the storm. The Bark Screen goes off where Rubble & Crew get a call from Lucas and Lily to invite Mix and Motor to play Super Squirrelly Whirly with them. Upon arrival, they go to the backyard and find it a mess where the storm knocked down the branches. Mix comes up with the idea to turn the mess into a Super Squirrelly Whirly Playground by calling in the rest of Rubble & Crew for help. They put together the Super Squirrelly Whirly Playground while having to deal with a blue jay whose chick was blown out of its nest during the storm causing Rubble & Crew, Lucas, and Lily to come to the baby blue jay's aid.
35a	9a	"The Crew Builds a Smoothie Shop"	Angela M. Sánchez	August 12, 2024	August 31, 2024	208A	N/A
While building a stand shade for the roller coaster during a hot day at Builder Cove's boardwalk, Rubble, Mix, Charger, and Wheeler see that Mayor Greatway and Omar's family are having a hard time staying cool while waiting to ride the roller coaster. They enlist Café Carl to make a treat that would help everyone stay cool. With his ice cream shop sold out of ice cream, he plans to make smoothies as he enlists Rubble & Crew to build a smoothie shop. Mix gets the idea to make the smoothie shop in the shape of a smoothie cup while Café Carl gathers the ingredients for a smoothie that includes the nearby coconuts. When the smoothie shop is completed near the coconut trees and Café Carl begins making the smoothies, the roller coaster starts to make the coconut trees shake causing Rubble & Crew to come up with a constructive solution for it.
35b	9b	"The Crew Builds a Dino Roof Party"	Diana Aydin	August 13, 2024	August 31, 2024	208B	N/A
At the Bark Yard, Rubble & Crew call up Sierra Sparkle to let her know that today is Charger's birthday. As Sierra works on a special song for Charger, Mix suggests that they hold Charger's birthday party on the roof of the Dinosaur Museum. While Grandpa Gravel works on the dinosaur cake, Rubble keeps Charger busy by having him fetch all the bolts and screws in the Bark Yard so that the rest of Rubble & Crew can work on the decorations for Charger's birthday party without him seeing it to spoil his birthday surprise. Once the decorations are created, the rest of Rubble & Crew work to get the decorations into the Dinosaur Museum with some of them being too big to fit inside causing a construction elevator to be built outside the Dinosaur Museum as they work to get everything to the roof before Charger arrives.
36a	10a	"The Crew Builds a Ferris Wheel"	Rachel Graham	August 14, 2024	September 7, 2024	209A	N/A
While en route to the beach, Rubble, Mix, Charger, and Wheeler take a detour when Grocer Gabriel needs help fixing his fruit and vegetable stand. Once that was done, Rubble & Crew learned that Grocer Gabriel has never played at the beach before including riding the roller coaster. He closes the grocery store and does various activities there. When it comes to the roller coaster on the boardwalk, Grocer Gabriel is too afraid to ride it as he considers it scary. Using Charger's crane, Rubble, Mix, and Wheeler look for Grocer Gabriel in the air where they find locate him on a bench. Upon meeting up with Grocer Gabriel, they learn that Grocer Gabriel did not want to get on the roller coaster as it goes too fast. To make a ride that goes up and down slowly, Mix gets the idea to have a ferris wheel that looks like Charger's crane grabber constructed.
36b	10b	"The Crew Builds a Farm Animal Yoga Space"	Liam Farrell	August 15, 2024	September 7, 2024	209B	N/A
At the Bark Yard, Coach Karima has Rubble, Mix, Charger, and Wheeler in yoga. Rubble & Crew gets call on the Bark Screen from Farmer Zoe who needs their help dealing with Mooreen, Truffles, Lenny, Benny, and Jenny who have been spooked after a storm ruined the roof of their barn. Rubble & Crew head out to repair the roof of the barn. Even after the roof is repaired and waterproofed, Mooreen, Truffles, Lenny, Benny, and Jenny are still spooked by the loud sounds. To remedy this, Mix gets the idea to teach them yoga and Wheeler calls in Coach Karima to teach the farm animals yoga. Rubble & Crew work on building a gazebo-like farm animal yoga space so that Coach Karima can teach yoga to Mooreen, Truffles, Lenny, Benny, and Jenny to get them calm.
37a	11a	"The Crew Builds Mr. Ducky-Doo a Special Diving Board"	Angela M. Sánchez	August 19, 2024	September 14, 2024	211A	N/A
At the Bark Yard, Rubble, Mix, Charger, and Wheeler get a call from Mayor Greatway who needs help at the lake. Today is the anniversary of when she met Mr. Ducky Doo and she wants to surprise him with a new diving board which she wants built by the end of the day that she declares Friendship Day. Upon arrival at the lake, Rubble & Crew work on building a duck diving board. A setback occurs when the nails and screws needed for the construction go missing. Soon, the wooden planks go missing. Rubble & Crew call Auntie Crane for more supplies. Once that was done, the supplies get stolen again and they find that Mr. Ducky Doo is responsible where he is trying to build a bench for Mayor Greatway causing Rubble & Crew to come up with a construction solution.
37b	11b	"The Crew Builds a Rainwater Tank"	Blake Pickens	August 20, 2024	September 14, 2024	211B	N/A
At Farmer Zoe's farm, Rubble, Mix, Charger, and Wheeler have fixed Farmer Zoe's fence. They see dark rain clouds rolling in as Farmer Zoe is told that rain can help out on the farm like make mud puddles for pigs, water the crops, and give water to the livestock. As Farmer Zoe finds that it will not rain after today, Mix gets the idea to build a rainwater tank for Farmer Zoe to use the stored rain water. After getting supplies from Auntie Crane, Rubble & Crew work to build the rainwater tank. Once it is done, Rubble & Crew find that Lenny, Benny, and Jenny have gotten into the rainwater tank. Once the chickens are out and the rain starts closing in, Rubble & Crew come up with a construction solution to keep the chickens from falling into the rainwater tank.
38a	12a	"The Crew Builds a Reuse-It Station"	Blake Pickens	August 21, 2024	September 21, 2024	213A	N/A
At the beach near the lighthouse, Rubble, Mix, Charger, and Wheeler arrive for a day at the beach. They find it interrupted when Park Ranger Rose had found a whole bunch of trash had washed up on the beach. Rubble & Crew offer to help clean up the trash. Mix gets the idea to re-use the trash by building a device to clean and re-use the garbage. Rubble calls it a Reuse-It Station will go to waste as they work to build it. Speed Meister overhears the discussion and plans to become a Cleanup Hero by building his own re-use it station. When Speed Meister shows off his Speedy Reuse-It Station before Rubble & Crew can build it, it malfunctions and explodes enough to spread the garbage all over Builder Cove. Now Rubble & Crew must work to gather the scattered garbage and make a better Reuse-It Station from the most unlikeliest of building materials.
38b	12b	"The Crew Builds a Duck Bridge"	Diana Aydin	August 22, 2024	September 21, 2024	213B	N/A
At the Bark Yard, Motor is quacking like a duck after Grandpa Gravel took her to feed them their special birdseed. To Rubble & Crew's surprise, three ducklings have shown up in the Bark Yard. Motor dressed up as a duck to lead the ducklings back to the lake. After getting through Builder Cove, Rubble & Crew reach the river as the log that was previously used falls into the river. To remedy this, Mix gets the idea to have a special duck-themed bridge for them to use. Auntie Crane arrives with the supplies and helps out with the construction. After it is complete, Rubble & Crew continue across the river and return them to the lake. Despite returning them, Rubble & Crew find the ducklings back at the Bark Yard must find a construction solution to keep them from returning to the Bark Yard even when they start circling Grandpa Gravel.
39a	13a	"The Crew Builds a Ballpark"	Jim Nolan	August 26, 2024	September 28, 2024	212A	N/A
In the park, Coach Karima is playing baseball with Rubble & Crew where Rubble hits a home run like Aaron Judge. Coach Karima mentions that he'll be partaking in a home-run derby where he'll be hitting 100 home runs and will be stopping in Builder Cove to see his fans. Aaron Judge arrives in Builder Cove where he has become familiar with Rubble & Crew. Speed Meister claims that Aaron Judge is not great as he plans to become the true Baseball Hero of Builder Cove. Aaron Judge gets a call from his dogs Penny and Gus who informs him that the road to the home-run derby has been closed. To remedy this, Aaron Judge persuades Rubble & Crew to build a ballpark so that Aaron Judge can break the home-run record. Once it is built, everyone attends the event as Speed Meister plans to strike Aaron Judge. When Aaron Judge gets 99 home runs, his lucky baseball bat breaks causing Rubble & Crew to make a new lucky baseball bat for Aaron Judge so that he can get his 100th home run in.
39b	13b	"The Crew Builds a Surf Bridge"	Angela M. Sánchez	August 27, 2024	September 28, 2024	212B	N/A
At the Bark Yard, Rubble, Mix, Charger, and Wheeler check on their supplies when they find Auntie Crane's surfboard. She mentions that she did some surfing and used to go all the time with her surfing buddies. There are awesome waves on Builder Cove's rocky shores, but Auntie Crane has no surfing buddies. Charger and Mix get the idea to be Auntie Crane's surf buddies as Rubble & Crew work to build surfboards with Grandpa Gravel's help. Once their customized surfboards are done, they head to the rocky beach to surprise her. Unfortunately, the sand at the rocky beach is too hot. After every attempt to get across the hot sand fails, Rubble & Crew get the idea to build a surf bridge to get to the ocean and work to build it before Auntie Crane arrives.
40a	14a	"The Crew Builds a Pizza Parlor"	Jordan Gershowitz	August 28, 2024	October 12, 2024	214A	N/A
As Rubble, Mix, Charger, and Wheeler have set up the table for the Meal with the Mayor Event, Mayor Greatway states that Café Carl is making pizzas for the event. As there is a long list of people attending, Café Carl states that his Popcorn Café only has a small oven. Mix gets the idea to build a pizza parlor with three ovens to cook the pizzas. As Rubble & Crew get the supplies they need, Speed Meister plans to become the pizza party hero by making his own pizzas that he will deliver. He makes the Speedy Pizza Paddle which ends up throwing his pizzas all over Builder Cove and even threw Speed Meister. After Rubble & Crew rescue Speed Meister, he cleans up the flying pizzas while Rubble & Crew work to build the pizza parlor with a giant oven to make a large pizza before everyone arrives.
40b	14b	"The Crew Builds an Airport Road"	Rachel Graham	August 29, 2024	October 12, 2024	214B	N/A
At the mini-golf course, Rubble, Mix, Charger, and Wheeler get a call from Mayor Greatway who mentions about concerns involving the road to the airport which is too windy. Omar mentions that his family might miss their flight to their grandmothers. Rubble & Crew plan to build a road through a canyon. Speed Meister gets the idea to build his own road and open a fried pickle stand. Rubble & Crew get their supplies from Auntie Crane and head out to find that Speed Meister has built his airport road that is to bumpy enough for Omar's car to collide with a pickle vat and spin out of control. When Speed Meister's attempt to clean up the pickle juice goes wrong, Rubble & Crew come to the rescue. Afterwards, Rubble & Crew come up with a construction solution to clean up and fix the airport road.
41a	15a	"The Crew Celebrates Builder Covegiving Day"	Jordan Gershowitz	November 11, 2024	November 30, 2024	217A	N/A
At the Bark Yard, Rubble & Crew set up the decorations for Builder Covegiving. They get a call on the Bark Screen from Mayor Greatway who wishes them a Happy Builder Coving Day. She is invited to the Bark Yard alongside Mr. Ducky Doo and the other citizens. Speed Meister finds everyone heading to the Bark Yard. Mayor Greatway sees Mr. McTurtle heading their way as she tells Mr. Ducky Doo to invite him and Speed Meister. Because he couldn't understand what Mr. McTurtle said, Speed Meister secretly follows everyone to the Bark Yard. To handle everyone, Mix suggests that they move the feast to Main Street and make a super-table. Feeling that he wasn't invited, Speed Meister plans to sabotage them by blocking the entrance to the Bark Yard with concrete. Now Rubble & Crew must find a way to get through it and get to Main Street so that they can build a super table.
41b	15b	"The Crew Builds a Rocket Ship Ride"	Jim Nolan	November 12, 2024	November 30, 2024	217B	N/A
During night time at the Bark Yard, Rubble, Charger, and Mix are howling at the Moon as Mix imagines that she is riding a rocket ship to the Moon so that she can give it the greatest Mix Makeover ever. As Mix states that they can't build a rocket, Rubble gets the idea to make a rocket ship ride with a Moon on top of it. Mix gets the idea to build it at the boardwalk where the other rides are. They work into the night putting together the rocket ship ride. When it is almost done, Mix starts her mix makeover as Charger lifts it up. Due to an accident while howling, the rubber construct of the Moon ends up boucing across town. Rubble & Crew pretend their vehicles are rocket ships so that they can go after the Moon construct and get it back to the boardwalk so that Mix can give it a much-needed Mix Makeover.
42a	16a	"The Crew Raises a Runway"	Evan Sinclair	November 13, 2024	December 7, 2024	218A	N/A
At the Bark Yard, Rubble, Wheeler, Charger, Mix find cement barriers at its entrance which Charger manages to move. Grandpa Gravel and Auntie Gravel explains that the cement barrier was placed because a lost baby deer got into the Bark Yard. Park Ranger Rose arrives to help the baby deer named Buttons get out of the Bark Yard. Rubble & Crew assist Park Ranger Rose by giving Buttons a lift to her forest. They find that the forest where Buttons lives is on the other side of the airport. Unfortunately, Buttons can't cross it because of the approaching airplane. Charger and Mix come up with an idea to have the runway raised so that Buttons can go underneath it as Motor is also enlisted to help. Afterwards, they work to put the asphalt down and paint the runway before Camila can land her airplane.
42b	16b	"The Crew Builds a Giant Skateboard"	Scott Gray	November 14, 2024	December 7, 2024	218B	N/A
While passing the boardwalk, Rubble, Wheeler, Charger, and Mix arrive at the skatepark where River and Auntie Crane's skate show is being held. Unfortunately, nobody is present because nobody was told about it. Charger and Mix get the idea to build a giant skateboard for River and Auntie Crane to build that they will tow around Builder Cove. At the Bark Yard, Rubble & Crew work to build a giant skateboard. Once it is built, the giant skateboard is brought to River and Auntie Crane who are impressed. Before Rubble & Crew can attach the cables to the giant skateboard, River and Auntie Crane do selfies on it as the giant skateboard rolls out of control. Rubble & Crew chase after the giant skateboard as River and Auntie Crane help to find a way to stop the giant skateboard.
43a	17a	"The Crew Builds an Indoor Skydiving Center"	Liam Farrell	November 18, 2024	December 21, 2024	215A	N/A
At City Hall, Mayor Greatway and Mr. Ducky Doo is visited by Rubble where they want Rubble to take a photo of them skydiving after having taken skydiving lessons. Rubble plans to invite his family to the airport to see the skydiving stunt. Camila is scheduled to fly Mayor Greatway and Mr. Ducky Doo into the sky as Wheeler, Charger, and Mix. Unfortunately, the winds are too strong as it blows Mr. Ducky Doo and his parachute away from the airport. After catching Mr. Ducky Doo, Camila states that the winds are still too strong giving Mix and Charger the idea to build an indoor skydiving center at the airport so that Mayor Greatway and Mr. Ducky Doo can do their stunt for Rubble to take a photo of.
43b	17b	"The Crew Builds a Roller Rink"	Michaela Foster	November 19, 2024	December 21, 2024	215B	N/A
Today is the day that Wheeler is going to show off his ice skating work with Truffles. Arriving at Farmer Zoe's farm with Rubble, Charger, and Mix, Wheeler learns from Farmer Zoe that the ice in the ice skating rink has melted. To get Truffles to do the trick with Wheeler, Rubble states that they'll get a construction solution. After seeing Auntie Crane's latest skateboarding activity, Rubble and Mix get the idea to make roller skates for Wheeler and Truffles. Once they are built, Farmer Zoe brings Truffles to the skate park so that they can do their skating trick here which does not go well for Truffles because of the ramps. To remedy this, Charger and Mix get the idea to turn the melted ice-skating rink into a roller rink.
44a	18a	"The Crew Builds a Bowling Alley"	Diana Aydin	November 20, 2024	December 28, 2024	216A	N/A
As Rubble, Wheeler, Charger, and Mix play a game of fetch in the Bark Yard, they stumble upon a bowling ball. Grandpa Gravel arrives and calls the bowling ball named Old Blue where they bowled together. As Grandpa Gravel has not bowled in a long time, Charger and Mix get the idea to build a bowling alley which Builder Cove doesn't have while covering up why they are borrowing Old Blue. Once the bowling alley is built, Rubble & Crew work to build a cubby for Old Blue. Unfortunately, Charger accidentally causes Old Blue to roll away as Rubble & Crew chase after it until it accidentally gets crushed by the Smash Masher. They work to rebuild Old Blue with glue, a sander, and a Mix Makeover before building Old Blue's cubby.
44b	18b	"The Crew Builds a Superbloom Path"	Michaela Foster	November 21, 2024	December 28, 2024	216B	N/A
Motor and Lily are with Park Ranger Rose in the forest to see some wildflowers that will be having a superbloom. Motor and Lily walk through the flowers despite Park Ranger Rose stating that there is not path through the wildflowers. When the superbloom occurs and traps them, Motor advises Park Ranger Rose to call Rubble & Crew for help with a flower-friendly construction solution. Upon arrival, Charger and Mix get the idea to make a superbloom path that goes over the superbloom. They build the superbloom path in accordance to Park Ranger Rose's opera singing.
45	19	"The Crew Makes Christmas Magical"	Bradley Zweig	December 2, 2024	December 14, 2024	219	N/A
At Builder's Cove boardwalk during Christmas Eve, Rubble & Crew decorate a Christmas tree. They get a call from Santa Claus who needs help from Rubble, Mix, Wheeler, and Charger to build all of the toys in time for Christmas because his Christmas elves ate too many candy canes enough to get stomachaches. They arrive at North Pole when Speed Meister follows them when he overheard them as he tries to be construction hero. Rubble & Crew start to build all the toys before tonight by building another toy workshop. Speed Meister plans to build his own toys. Because Santa Claus's reindeer flew away because of Speed Meister trying to attach them to the Speedy Mobile, Rubble & Crew have an idea for a sleigh with wing flap and conveyor belts for them to run on. Speed Meister uses his Speedy Mobile to give Santa's special sleigh a boost up in the sky as they're flying. Santa delivers presents to Builder Cove's residents on the boardwalk. Note: This is the 1st half-hour episode that is not a crossover.
46a	20a	"The Crew Builds a Winter Wonderland"	Liam Farrell	December 9, 2024	January 11, 2025	221A	N/A
During Winter at the Bark Yard, Rubble, Wheeler, Charger, and Mix have built snowpups (a pup version of a snowman). They are contacted by Café Carl on the Bark Screen who states that a large mound of snow is keeping anyone from reaching his smoothie shop. Once the snow is cleared, nobody is present because every ride is covered in snow. Mix gives Café Carl the idea to make hot chocolate as Rubble & Crew plan to make some stuff that people can enjoy in winter like a build-a-snowman, an ice skating rink, and a giant sled ramp as part of a winter wonderland. While Café Carl gets his hot chocolate recipe, Rubble & Crew build everything for the winter wonderland near the boardwalk while giving the smoothie shop a hot chocolate shop form. Then they set up lights and work to attract visitors.
46b	20b	"The Crew Builds a Giant Snow Squirrelly Whirly"	Eva Konstantopoulos	December 10, 2024	January 11, 2025	221B	N/A
Mix and Motor watch the latest episode of "Super Squirrely Whirly" where she gives the viewers a special mission regarding an art project. Wanting it to be bigger, Mix and Motor plan to build a Super Squirrely Whirly statue. They enlist Rubble, Wheeler, and Charger to help as Wheeler states that it is going to snow today. They gather some supplies to make a Super Squirrely Whirly statue. Due to a lack of supplies, Rubble tries to call Camila to get them more supplies only to learn that she's snowed in. To remedy this as the snow starts coming down, Charger and Mix get the idea to build a giant Super Squirrely Whirly out of the snow where Motor and Mix sculpt the head and then help to sculpt the body.
47a	21a	"The Crew Builds a Post Office"	Dan Danko	December 11, 2024	January 25, 2025	220A	N/A
While doing repairs to Omar's mail wagon, Rubble finds that Omar's house is filled with packages. Omar's twin brother Romar comes to visit his family and brings his drums. To rectify the large packages including the ones that have a lot of nuts in Omar's house, Rubble comes up with a construction solution by having a post office built. Rubble enlists Wheeler, Charger, and Mix in building a post office near an old oak tree. Once the exterior construction is done, Omar and Romar bring the large packages of nuts in which attracts three squirrels that Rubble & Crew work to not chase after them. When the squirrels start to affect the interior construction of the post office by targeting the nut packages, Rubble & Crew must work to keep the nuts from being taken by the squirrels and come up with a construction solution involving food packages.
47b	21b	"The Crew Builds a Super Farm Animal Wash"	Scott Gray	December 12, 2024	January 25, 2025	220B	N/A
At Farmer Zoe's farm, Rubble, Wheeler, Charger, and Mix assist in setting for Farm Animal Petting Day. To handle their truck, Wheeler has it towed through the super car wash. Once that was done, Farmer Zoe's truck is taken back to the farm where they find that Truffles, Lenny, Benny, Jenny, and Mooreen have gone into a feeding frenzy with the new jam and have gotten some of the jam on them. To help Farmer Zoe, Wheeler attempts to get the jam off of the farm animals. Charger and Mix get the idea to have the super car wash modified to wash the farm animals that involves animal-safe rollers, animal-safe soap, and modified blow dryers while still being able to wash the cars. While the other animals made it through, Mooreen is unable to get through causing Rubble & Crew to come up with a way to get her into the super car wash.
48a	22a	"The Crew Builds a Hotel"	Peter Hunzinker	December 19, 2024	February 8, 2025	222A	N/A
At Farmer Zoe's farm, Rubble, Wheeler, Charger, and Mix have just finished the barn maintenance in light of Farmer Zoe's cousin Hadley Hartley coming to Builder Cove to visit. Hadley arrives where he meets Rubble & Crew where he has an allergic reaction to Farmer Zoe's farm animals enough to sneeze. As Builder Cove has no hotel, Rubble comes up with the idea to construct Builder Cove's first hotel. As Rubble & Crew work on building a hotel, Hadley helps to design it. Even when it is built, Hadley would like the hotel made super that involves balconies and flower baskets. Unfortunately, Farmer Zoe's farm animals followed her to the new hotel causing Mix and Charger to make a special animal hotel for them to stay in and be far enough to not make Hadley to sneeze.
48b	22b	"The Crew Builds a Hiking Trail"	Charity L.Miller	December 20, 2024	February 8, 2025	222B	N/A
At the Bark Yard, Mix gets a purple razzle blast in the mail. The Bark Screen goes off as Rubble & Crew get a call from Mayor Greatway who informs them of Mr. Ducky Doo's surprise birthday at the top of Tool Top Mountain where she and Mr. Ducky Doo will do a skydiving performance from Camila's airplane. As they make their way to the top of Tool Top Mountain, Rubble & Crew find a lot of hiking trails going up Tool Top Mountain as they meet up with Park Ranger Rose. She states that the trails are not marked causing Mix to get the make a sign to help guide everyone to the top of Tool Top Mountain. Rubble & Crew proceed to make the trail signs, plant them in the ground, and paint the signs. They reach a complication when Wingsy makes off with Mix's paint causing confusion for Juniper, Shopkeeper Shelley, and Café Carl. After Wingsy evades them, Mix comes up with a construction solutions to finish painting the signs.
49	23	"The Crew and Rocky Build a Bear Island"	Evan Sinclair	March 10, 2025	March 15, 2025	224	N/A
At the Bark Yard, Charger builds a baby crib for the new baby black bear as Wheeler states that bears sleep in dens. Rubble & Crew is visited by Rocky who wants to see the new baby black bear. He demonstrates his recycling abilities by retooling the crib into a rocking chair. Rubble & Crew get a call from Park Ranger Rose who gets the idea to call the baby black bear Fuzzy from Rocky. As Fuzzy's mother is protective, Park Ranger Rose needs Rubble & Crew to build something that enables them to see Fuzzy without disturbing its mother. Speed Meister finds that Rocky is in town thanks to Mr. McTurtle and overhears Mix's construction solution to Park Ranger Rose involving an observation tower nearby the black bears. As Rocky assists Rubble & Crew in building an observation tower, Speed Meister plans to build an observation tower before Rubble & Crew does which collapses onto the black bears' tree. Now Rubble & Crew must clean up the mess, find Fuzzy when it gets separated from its mother as Speed Meister attempts to rescue it, and recycle the mess to build a boat to rescue Fuzzy, Speed Meister, Mr. McTurtle, and then recycle it into an artificial bear island for the black bears. Note: This is the 6th crossover episode.
50	24	"The Crew Builds a Kangaroo Safari"	Rachel Graham	March 11, 2025	March 22, 2025	223	N/A
50	24	"The Crew Plays in the Construction Games"	Rachel Graham	March 11, 2025	March 22, 2025	223	N/A
"The Crew Builds a Kangaroo Safari": At the Bark Yard, Wheelers shows Lucas and Lily a safari book as they learn how a safari works. Upon seeing a kangaroo in a book, Lucas and Lily want to see an actual kangaroo. After seeing Rubble hopping around on while testing a jackhammer, Lucas and Lily give Rubble the idea to have a construction solution by building their own kangaroo. With help from Mix and Charger, Rubble and Wheeler construct some mechanical kangaroo and a safari path. After the mechanical kangaroos are modified to hop around, Charger's latest Zoom Zoom Zoomies causes the mechanical kangaroo joey to hop out of control out of the Bark Yard. Now Rubble & Crew must catch the mechanical kangaroo joey and get it back to the Bark Yard while seeing Crunchy, Wingsy, Buttons, and other animals along the way. "The Crew Plays in the Construction Games": At the Library Tea Shop, Wheeler picks out a book about the Construction Games for Grandpa Gravel to read. Whoever one the Golden Hammer Trophy and that Grandpa Gravel competed only for him to come close to it. Overhearing it, Speed Meister pitches an idea for him to compete in the Construction Games between him and Rubble & Crew. With Grandpa Gravel serving as the referee, he suggests that this be a fair game. As the Construction Games begin, Grandpa Gravel states that whoever wins the Foundation Forming Challenge, the Screw Tightening Challenge, and the Jackhammer Challenge will win the Golden Trophy. Though Speed Meister plans to cheat in the Construction Games by trying to secretly sabotage Rubble & Crew at the different activities.
51a	25a	"The Crew Builds a Rooftop Stage"	Michaela Foster	March 12, 2025	March 29, 2025	225A	N/A
At the Bark Yard, Wheeler is surprised by Rubble, Mix, and Charger's construction of a tool organizer for his pup house. After finding the right spot to put Wheeler's tool organizer. Rubble & Crew gets a call from Grocer Gabriel who needs help preparing for Banana Day where people will get bananas for the different banana-based food products. Sierra Sparkle joins the call who need their help when they arrive. Upon arrival at Grocer Gabriel's grocery store, Rubble & Crew learn that Sierra Sparkle's delivered stage is blocking the grocery store. Rubble & Crew work to find a place to put Sierra Sparkle's stage before they can build something to tell everyone about Banana Day. Inspired by placing Wheeler's tool organizer on his pup house roof after every other place fails, Rubble & Crew place Sierra Sparkle's stage on top of the grocery store.
51b	25b	"The Crew Fixes the Lighthouse"	Robin J. Stein	March 13, 2025	March 29, 2025	225B	N/A
While at Grocer Gabriel's grocery store doing some maintenance, Rubble, Mix, Charger, and Wheeler plan to look at the stars with Park Ranger Rose. Speed Meister plans to get his face out somewhere so that he can get people to enlist him for their construction job. While in the park with Park Ranger Rose, Rubble & Crew find that Speed Meister has tampered with the lighthouse by painting his face on the lighthouse light as Rubble gets a call from Camila that she needs to get to shore to complete her water delivery. Rubble & Crew arrives and learn about Speed Meister's tampering with the lighthouse light and badly hammering wood over the door. Rubble & Crew must work to fix the lighthouse so that Camila can get to shore safely.
52a	26a	"The Crew Builds a Solar-Powered Bus"	Peter Hunziker	March 17, 2025	April 5, 2025	226A	N/A
As Wheeler tests his new solar-powered tablet in the park with Rubble, Mix, and Charger present, they get a call from Sierra Sparkle who informs them that she has written a new song about nature which she will perform on the top of Tool Top Mountain. As there's no parking spaces on Tool Top Mountain, Rubble plans to have Camilla deliver an electric bus as they work on building a bus station. Speed Meister overhears the discussion and plans to commandeer the bus and drive it up Tool Top Mountain. After the bus station is built, Camilla brings the electric bus in as it is plugged in to the charging station. As Rubble & Crew work on building bus stops, Speed Meister and Mr. McTurtle steal the bus when it was not fully charged. After the bus rans out of power halfway up to Tooltop Mountain, Rubble saves Speed Meister who accidentally backs into the charging station causing Rubble & Crew to hybridize the electric bus into a solar-powered bus.
52b	26b	"The Crew Builds a Lifeguard Tower"	Charity L. Miller	March 18, 2025	April 5, 2025	226B	N/A
At the Bark Yard, Rubble, Mix, Charger, Wheeler, and Motor are preparing for a beach day. They each pack up the different beach day items. Upon their arrival at the beach, they meet up with Coach Karima who has become Builder Cove's new lifeguard. When Motor's rubber duck Ducky ends up lost during the game of frisbee, Mix and Charger get the idea to build a lifeguard tower to help look for it. Using extra material from Wheeler's truck, Rubble & Crew construct a lifeguard tower. Once the lifeguard tower is built as high as it can complete with a slide and a big shade, Coach Karima spots Ducky in the waves as Coach Karima works to save Ducky.

=== Season 3 (2025) ===
No. overall	No. in season	Title	Written by	U.S. air date	Canadian air date	Prod. code	U.S. viewers (millions)
53a	1a	"The Crew Builds a Vet Clinic"	Angela M. Sánchez	March 19, 2025	April 12, 2025	301A	N/A
At City Hall, Rubble, Mix, Charger, and Wheeler are setting up a bike rack at City Hall as they find the mouse family that lives near City Hall awaiting for the arrival of Dr. Diwa who is Builder Cove's visiting veterinarian. She is here to give the mice a check-up. Then she has a check-up with Crunchy the Beaver, Mooreen the Cow, and Wingsy the Eagle. Noting the assorted animal patients that Dr. Diwa is seeing, Mix and Charger get an idea to build a veterinary clinic so that she can handle all the animal patients at once. Once the vet clinic is done and all the animal patients have been rounded up, Rubble & Crew and Dr. Diwa find all the animal patients running amuck. This causes Rubble & Crew to build expansions to be compatible with all the animal patients so that Dr. Diwa can work on each of them.
53b	1b	"The Crew Builds a Mermaid Party"	Diana Aydin	March 20, 2025	April 12, 2025	301B	N/A
At the beach, Rubble, Mix, Charger, and Wheeler are building a mermaid-themed party for Lily's birthday. Following the setting up of the decorations, Rubble & Crew have a setback when it starts to rain. After the rain is done, every thing made for the mermaid-themed party has been found soaked disappointing Lily. Rubble states that they can still plan a bigger and better beach party. With the chance that it might rain again, Mix and Charger get the idea to build a beach under a roof with its own ocean and waves at the outdoor gym. After getting the supplies, Rubble & Crew move the gym at the outdoor gym to set up the stuff for the mermaid beach party as well as building a mermaid costume and a clamshell throne.
54	2	"The Crew Builds a Sea Wall"	Bradley Zweig	May 12, 2025	May 31, 2025	303	N/A
Rubble, Mix, Charger, and Wheeler are woken up by Auntie Crane and summoned to the crane tower. Auntie Crane unveils a vehicle called the Bark Yard Zoomer which contains mobile versions of what is found in the Bark Yard. While Auntie Crane continues tinkering with it, Rubble & Crew are contacted by Park Ranger Rose who informs them that the recent weather has destroyed the bridge and she wants them to rebuild the bridge so that Mama Bear and Fuzzy can get into the forest before a big storm hits. Learning of Rubble & Crew's mission, Speed Meister plans to do another attempt to become the Wildlife Hero of Builder Cove. When Speed Meister botches the bridge repairs, Rubble & Crew clean up his mess and rebuilds the bridge only for the black bears to not be able to cross the bridge. With a weather update planning to bring large waves to hit Bear Island, Mix and Charger plan to build a sea wall as Auntie Crane is called to bring the Bark Yard Zoomer to help build the seawall. Note: This is the 2nd half-hour episode that is not a crossover.
55a	3a	"The Crew Builds a Hotel Elevator"	Peter Hunziker	May 13, 2025	May 24, 2025	302A	N/A
While at the boardwalk, Rubble, Mix, Charger, and Wheeler feel the air getting cold. The weather forecast has called for snow. When it starts to snow, everyone goes to Hotel Hadley where Hadley allows Omar's family, Shopkeeper Shelley, Farmer Zoe, and Coach Karmia to check in. Rubble & Crew lends a helping hand to Hadley. Due to constantly going up the stairs, Mix gets the idea to build twisty slides to get back down faster. After getting the supplies from Auntie Crane, Rubble & Crew build the slide. However, it becomes difficult when it comes to carrying Grandpa Gravel's soup to everyone. This causes Rubble & Crew to come up with a construction solution by making a rocket ship-shaped elevator.
55b	3b	"The Crew Builds a Popcorn-Cat Café"	Joey Clift	May 14, 2025	May 24, 2025	302B	N/A
After helping Grocer Gabriel fix the grocery store's roof, Rubble, Mix, Charger, and Wheeler are contacted by Café Carl who has a big surprise for them. Upon arrival at the popcorn café, Rubble & Crew are shown five kittens that Café Carl has adopted who are too young to leave at home and he has brought them to work. However, the kittens are causing problems at the popcorn café by making a mess. To deal with the kittens, Rubble & Crew come up with a construction solution to build stuff for the kittens to play with like a ball pit, chew toy, and obstacle course. When that doesn't work, Rubble calls in Dr. Diwa who states that those stuff are only for pups leading to Rubble & Crew to build a cat play space and making the popcorn café into a popcorn-cat café.
56a	4a	"The Crew Builds a Super Mega Movie Screen"	Jim Nolan	May 19, 2025	June 7, 2025	304A	N/A
At the Bark Yard, Mix and Motor talk about an upcoming Super Squirrelly Whirly action movie as Rubble states that Rubble & Crew have been enlisted by Mayor Greatway to set up for the movie at the drive-in movie theater. They set up the movie posters and tend to the movie screen. When everyone in town shows up to see the movie, self-proclaimed #1 fan Speed Meister tries to take the number one parking spot where his attempt to adjust the Speedy-Mobile to see the screen better causes him to accidentally damage the movie screen. After a remorseful Speed Meister and Mr. McTurtle are rescued, Mix gets the idea for Rubble & Crew to make a gigantic movie screen with help from the Bark Yard Zoomer so that everyone can see the movie.
56b	4b	"The Crew Builds an Auntie Day Present"	Michaela Foster	May 20, 2025	June 7, 2025	304B	N/A
Today is Auntie Day as Auntie Crane helps Motor find Ducky as Auntie Crane takes them to the duck pond. While they are away, Rubble, Mix, Charger, and Wheeler talk about Auntie Day in Rubble's puphouse. They decide to build something for Auntie Crane as they cover up their plans by not going to the duck pond with them and that they had to work on a dance routine. Once Auntie Crane and Motor are away, Grandpa Gravel bakes some peanut butter bone cupcakes for Auntie Crane and inspires the pups in building something for Auntie Crane. They work on building a large picture project that reminds Auntie Crane of her pups until Mix runs out of paint causing them to come up with a construction solution to finish the project before Auntie Crane returns.
57a	5a	"The Crew Builds a Giant Skate Track"	Harron Atkins	May 23, 2025 (Amazon and On Demand)	June 21, 2025	305A	N/A
Rubble and Crew help River take lots of pictures for the big photo contest by building a super-fast way to get around Builder Cove.
57b	5b	"The Crew Builds a Giant Ice Cream Maker"	Robin J. Stein	May 21, 2025	June 21, 2025	305B	N/A
After helping to make a sign for Café Carl's big ice cream day where Carlberry Crunch Ice Cream is returning, Rubble, Mix, Charger, and Wheeler are shown Café Carl's ice cream maker and how he makes his ice cream. With Café Carl noting that his ice cream maker is too small, Mix gets the idea to make a giant ice cream maker the size of his ice cream shop. Wanting to be the Ice Cream King of Builder Cove, Speed Meister plans to share his invention of his fried pickle parfait. As Rubble & Crew build the giant ice cream maker, Speed Meister shares his fried pickle parfait which does not go well as he plans to sabotage the giant ice cream maker with concrete. This causes Rubble & Crew to come up with a construction solution involving Mix's cement truck and a construction solution to make bowls and spoons. Note: This is the last episode where Luxton Handspiker voices Rubble due to him hitting puberty.
58	6	"The Crew Builds a Skyscraper"	Bradley Zweig	September 8, 2025	September 26, 2025	310	N/A
With Builder Cove still growing, Mayor Greatway informs everyone present that they will be having their first skyscraper which will be Builder Cove's most challenging build as she enlists Rubble & Crew to build it. Mayor Greatway wants them to also place something at the top of the skyscraper that is special. As their vehicles are two small for the job, Grandpa Gravel unveils Rubble & Crew's big vehicles as they also don their new outfits and equipment as they work on the skyscraper that will become the Builder Cove Community Tower. Surprised by the new vehicles and not being picked to work on the skyscraper, Speed Meister calls in his older brother Mega Meister to help him build his skyscraper as Mega Meister arrives with Mr. McHippo. Though Mega Meister's skyscraper does not come out the way he hopes and Speed Meister takes over the project to place the top on the skyscraper. When the Meister Brothers' skyscraper bounces out of control towards Rubble & Crew's skyscraper, Rubble & Crew must stop the runaway skyscraper and finish their skyscraper. Note #1: This is the first episode of the "Big Builds" episodes. In addition to Cory Doran being promoted to the main voice cast, this is the first episode where Lucien Duncan-Reid reprises Rubble from Paw Patrol. Note #2: This is the 3rd half-hour episode that is not a crossover.
59a	7a	"The Crew Lifts Up City Hall"	Evan Sinclair	September 9, 2025	October 3, 2025	311A	N/A
At Farmer Zoe's farm where they are painting the barn, Rubble & Crew are told by Park Ranger Rose about a herd of migrating bison which are heading into Buider Cove. With the updated map, Rubble & Crew learn that the bison herd will run into Café Carl's pizza parlor and will crash into city hall. To save the pizza parlor, Rubble & Crew build a platform to save eveyone and enable the bison to pass through. Then they must work to come up with a construction solution to save city hall. With the bison briefly enclosed in the roundabout, Rubble & Crew must fetch their big vehicles so that they can lift city hall before the bison break free.
59b	7b	"The Crew Builds a Rotating Restaurant"	Jim Nolan	September 10, 2025	October 3, 2025	311B	N/A
Lucas and Lily have brought Omar and Juniper to Café Carl's pizza parlor for their anniversary with Rubble & Crew also dining there. Mayor Greatway has plans to launch fireworks. Unfortunately, dark clouds have appeared in the sky. Charger and Mix plan to place a restaurant on top of the Builder Cove Community Tower. Rubble & Crew fetch their big vehicles where they start by building the restaurant on the ground. Once the ground part of the construction is done, Rubble & Crew work to hoist the restaurant to the top of the Builder Cove Community Tower and weld it in. When Speed Meister and Mega Meister do things to affect the anniversary, Rubble & Crew come up with a construction solution that ends up converting the restaurant into a rotating restaurant before the fireworks go off.
60	8	"The Crew Builds a Giant Tunnel"	Scott Gray	September 15, 2025	October 10, 2025	312	N/A
While hiking in the forest with Park Ranger Rose, Rubble, Mix, Charger, and Wheeler come across a large meteorite. Park Ranger Rose states that they can display the meteorite among the other rocks at the Dinosaur Museum as Rubble suggests that they use their big vehicles. Speed Meister and Mega Meister were shown to have tea nearby as Mega Meister has a plan to deliver the meteor to the Dinosaur Museum himself with Speed Meister tagging along. They accidentally send the meteor rolling causing Rubble & Crew to stop it before it smashes into Builder Cove. Once that was done, Rubble & Crew come up with a construction solution to build a giant tunnel even when Motor is called in to help with the construction. Note: This is the 4th half-hour episode that is not a crossover.
61a	9a	"The Crew Builds a Mega Stunt Ramp"	Peter Hunziker	September 16, 2025	October 31, 2025	313A	N/A
At the library tea shop, Rubble, Mix, Charger, and Wheeler are reading a book about different motorcycle stunts. The book shows a picture of someone that looks like a younger Mayor Greatway as she shows up and reveals that the woman in the picture is her grandmother Moto Mabel as Mayor Greatway plans to do her famous motorcycle stunt called the Triple Flip-A-Wow. Just then, Mega Meister shows up stating that he wants to do a motorcycle stunt. Mix pitches an idea for a stunt show as Rubble & Crew make stunt ramps inside the ballpark. Once that is done, Speed Meister pitches the idea for Mayor Greatway and Mega Meister to jump over the ballpark. Rubble & Crew fetch their big vehicles to build a mega stunt ramp. Speed Meister secretly having a plan to make sure Mega Meister wins by cheating.
61b	9b	"The Crew Builds a Solar Farm"	Joey Clift	September 17, 2025	October 31, 2025	313B	N/A
At the ballpark, Rubble, Mix, Charger, and Wheeler are setting up for Sierra Sparkle's concert including a light-up sign. Sierra Sparkle calls Rubble & Crew telling them that she has made a song about her father Grocer Gabriel. After doing a test on the different lights and speakers, Rubble & Crew find that they used too much power causing all of Builder Cove to lose power as Grocer Gabriel hurts his foot slipping on some melting food. Inspired by the solar panel bus, Mix plans to make use of some solar powers to power the town as Wheeler proposes that they build a solar farm. Rubble gets the idea to cover the Builder Cove Community Tower in solar panels with help from their big vehicles. Once the solar farm is complete, Rubble & Crew must find a way to get an injured Grocer Gabriel to see his daughter from his grocery store.
62a	10a	"The Crew Builds a Giant Turtle House"	Angela M. Sánchez	September 22, 2025	November 7, 2025	306A	N/A
Today is Friendship Day. Rubble has made Mix, Charger, and Wheeler a pup treat tower that resembles their crane tower as they pick off it. Meanwhile, Speed Meister is not into Friend Appreciation Day until Mr. McTurtle took a picture of himself and Speed Meister. After a visit from Rubble & Crew, Speed Meister plans to build a big turtle house for Mr. McTurtle with the stuff that would accommodate him. When it doesn't come out the way he hoped where he accidentally builds it around him, Speed Meister has no choice but to enlist Rubble & Crew to safely rescue Mr. McTurtle. Afterwards, Rubble & Crew help Speed Meister make Mr. McTurtle a better giant turtle house with help from Auntie Crane and the Bark Yard Zoomer.
62b	10b	"The Crew Builds a Giant Volcano"	Dan Danko	September 23, 2025	November 7, 2025	306B	N/A
At the Dinosaur Museum, the science fair run by Park Ranger Rose will be hosted there as Rubble, Mix, Charger, and Wheeler help set up as Builder Cover's scientific minds will be showing off their talents. While Lily shows off her experiment involving shining a light through a crystal, Lucas shows off his volcano project. When Lucas' cardboard volcano collapses, Rubble & Crew plan to build a new volcano that is bigger than the cardboard volcano. Auntie Crane and the Bark Yard Zoomer are called in to help build the volcano that will be built in front of the Dinosaur Museum and then be placed on its roof. Once the volcano with its own gage is built, Auntie Crane lifts it to the top of the Dinosaur Museum as Wingsy sits on it causing Rubble & Crew to get her off before the volcano can erupt.
63a	11a	"The Crew Builds a Firefighter Training Center"	Joey Clift	September 24, 2025	November 21, 2025	307A	N/A
Rubble, Mix, Charger, Wheeler, and Motor are doing some paving near Café Carl's popcorn-cat café when one of the kittens gets stuck in a tree. Motor uses her voluteer fire captain status to get it down. Mayor Greatway praises Motor's staff and plans to get her some help. Later that day, Mayor Greatway has enlisted Fire Captain Catáwi to help run the fire station who is a fan of nature. Noting that there is no firefighter training center, Fire Captain Catáwi is told by Rubble that they can build one as Rubble summons Auntie Crane and the Bark Yard Zoomer to help out so that new firefighters can be trained. Once it is completed and tested out, Fire Captain Catáwi makes Rubble, Mix, Charger, and Wheeler volunteer firefighters as their skills are put to the test when the popcorn-cat café catches fire with the kittens trapped on the roof.
63b	11b	"The Crew Builds a Sierra Sparkle Space Show"	Eva Konstantopoulos	September 25, 2025	November 21, 2025	307B	N/A
While cleaning the Smash Masher, Rubble & Crew are visited by Sierra Sparkle who needs their help to do a concert under the full moon which is tonight and is need of a theme for that show. His latest Zoom Zoom Zoomies leads to Charger tripping and hurting his right front paw. Dr. Diwa examines Charger and places a cone on him to keep him from licking his paw until it fully heals. With Charger worried that he can't be in the show with the cone, Mix states that he can still be Charger as he works to hide the cone from Sierra. This gives Mix and Wheeler to help Charger come up with an alien and space theme that impresses Sierra. Rubble & Crew plan to make the observatory the sight of the alien and space-themed concert with help from Auntie Crane and the Bark Yard Zoomer.
64a	12a	"The Crew Builds a Giant Duck Plane"	Scott Gray	December 3, 2025	December 19, 2025	308A	N/A
Today is Duck Day as Rubble, Mix, Charger, Wheeler, and Motor set up near the pond. Park Ranger Rose shows a duck movie. Just then, a flock of ducks land in the lake when they are supposed to be flying south for the winter. As it will be getting cold soon, Motor tries to get the ducks to followe her. This gives Rubble an idea to build something to fly. First, they try a giant duck kite which is towed by Rubble's excavator. The giant kite crashes into a tree. Charger and Mix get the idea from Camila's airplane and persuade her to covert her airplane into a giant duck plane with consultation from Mr. Ducky Doo.
64b	12b	"The Crew Builds a Vet Room for Motor"	Diana Aydin	December 5, 2025	December 19, 2025	308B	N/A
At the veterinary clinic, Dr. Diwa is wrapping up her check-up on Rubble, Mix, Charger, and Wheeler. Today also happens to be Motor's first check-up. However, Motor is not comfortable with getting a check-up when Rubble contacts Auntie Crane. To get Motor comfortable with her first check-up, Dr. Diwa tells Rubble & Crew to find information on why Motor is not comfortable getting a check-up. They learn that Motor does not know what happens at the veterinary clinic as they work to explain what happens there. Rubble gets the idea to build a play vet office to show her with Rubble posing as the vet. Afterwards, Motor assumes that Dr. Diwa would not be as good as "Dr. Rubble" leading to Rubble & Crew to build a vet room area filled with things for Motor to smash.
65a	13a	"The Crew Builds an Art Museum"	Robin J. Stein	December 9, 2025	December 26, 2025	309A	N/A
At the Barkyard, Grandpa Gravel makes pancakes for Rubble, Mix, Charger, Wheeler, and Motor as he receives a picture from Motor. River shows up and photographs them eating pancakes. This gives River an idea to photograph of people eating different foods as part of an art project. Mix gets the idea to build an art museum to surprise River and pitches an idea to build it in the style of a bowl of spaghetti. Due to River's latest flower and vehicle projects, Rubble & Crew constantly rework the design until they get an idea to give the art museum the shape of a refrigerator as Rubble calls Auntie Crane and the Bark Yard Zoomer to help.
65b	13b	"The Crew Builds a Giant Alphorn"	Evan Sinclair	December 11, 2025	December 26, 2025	309B	N/A
While out hiking with Park Ranger Rose, Rubble, Mix, Charger, and Wheeler encounter a baby goat that Farmer Zoe just got. Because the baby goat and Park Ranger Rose enjoy singing, Farmer Zoe gets the idea to name her Rosie. After reminding Farmer Zoe that goats do not live in houses, Rubble & Crew build a playspace for Rosie in the barn. Once that is done, Rosie enjoys it. En route back to the Bark Yard, Rubble & Crew find that Rosie got out of the farm causing Rubble & Crew to work to get her back. When catching her proves to be a problem, Rubble & Crew call Park Ranger Rose for help as well as building an alphorn at Mix and Wheeler's to make use of on Tool Top Mountain.

=== Season 4 (2025–26) ===
This is the last season to air on Treehouse TV in Canada. The next two seasons were released by Knowledge Kids.

No. overall	No. in season	Title	Written by	U.S. air date	Canadian air date	Prod. code	U.S. viewers (millions)
66	1	"The Crew Builds a Halloween Maze"	Evan Sinclair	October 10, 2025	October 17, 2025	402	N/A
66	1	"The Crew Builds a Giant Pup House"	Eva Konstantopoulos	October 10, 2025	October 17, 2025	402	N/A
"The Crew Builds a Halloween Maze": On Halloween, Rubble, Mix, Charger, and Wheeler prepare for the Halloween Festival with a hay maze, pumpkins, and decor. Auntie Crane & Grandpa Gravel call the pups stating that Rubble, Wheeler, Charger, and Mix have Halloween costumes, but Motor's dragon costume was lost in the mail. As the others head to the Bark Yard to get their costumes, Omar shows up at the hay maze to bring Motor's Halloween costume as Romar shows up in Builder Cove to spend Halloween with Omar's family. They both enter the hay maze to see who can get through it first. When Rubble & Crew return to the Halloween Festival, they end up having to rescue Omar and Romar. To save Omar, Rubble has Motor do a destruction solution to destroy the hay maze. Then Charger and Mix come up with a construction solution to make a pumpkin maze. "The Crew Builds a Giant Pup House": Rubble, Mix, Charger, Wheeler, and Motor are at the Drive-Thru Theater setting up for the film Websy the Spider. Unfortunately, Rubble is still afraid of spiders. When the Websy the Spider movie is shown, Rubble is uncomfortable with the sight of Websy the Spider. Afterwards, the pups return to the Bark Yard where Rubble's fear of spiders is known upon mistaking different shadows for them. Once everyone is asleep, Rubble gets frightened enough to wake everyone up as they learn of his fear of spiders. Wheeler gets the idea for everyone to gather their pupbeds into his puphouse. Because of the tight space ejecting them all out of Wheeler's puphouse, Charger and Mix get the idea to make a larger puphouse complete with a giant pupbed so that they can all get to sleep.
67	2	"The Crew Builds a North Pole Village for Santa"	Jim Nolan	December 1, 2025	December 5, 2025	405	N/A
67	2	"The Crew Builds a Giant Dreidel"	Bradley Zweig	December 1, 2025	December 5, 2025	405	N/A
"The Crew Builds a North Pole Village for Santa": During the Christmas season, everyone is setting up for Santa Claus' arrival in Builder Cove. Rubble, Mix, Charger, and Wheeler work to build a North Pole village for him with help from Auntie Crane who also helps Motor with a giant ice sculpture. Noting that he won't have time to tell Santa Claus what he wants, Speed Meister builds his own North Pole village far from Builder Cove. Santa Claus gets fooled by Speed Meister who accidentally sets off the Speedy-Mobile's helicopter form while looking for his Christmas list causing it to fly out of control. Upon getting called by Speed Meister, Rubble & Crew work to save Santa Claus. Afterwards, the sleigh loses its landing gear on the bike shop causing Grandma Gravel, Auntie Crane, and Motor to make snow for them to land on. "The Crew Builds a Giant Dreidel": On the Eighth Night of Hannukah, Mayor Greatway prepares for the Builder Cove Hannukah Party that Rubble, Mix, Charger, and Wheeler are helping to set up following a rainy night that left mud everywhere. Mix pitches an idea to Mayor Greatway to build a large Hanukkah menorah as Mayor Greatway asks if they will be playing dreidel at the party as that is her favorite Hanukkah game. Mix states that they are building a super duper giant-size dreidel complete with Rubble playing a Hanukkah song that everyone can dance to and Grandpa Gravel making sufganiyot made with berries from Tool Top Mountain. After the large Hanukkah menorah is built, Auntie Crane brings too much wood in the Bark Yard Zoomer. Rubble & Crew start building the giant-size dreidel and set up the glow in the dark dance floor for the party while also having to save Grandpa Gravel who is stuck in the mud on Tooltop Mountain with help from the extra wood.
68a	3a	"The Crew Builds a Fancy Drive-Thru Restaurant"	Sascha Paladino	December 16, 2025	January 2, 2026	401A	N/A
Rubble, Mix, Charger, and Wheeler are invited by Café Carl to his pizza restaurant. He tells them about his plans to build a fancy restaurant. Camila shows up to order pizza as there are no restaurants between Adventure Bay and Builder Cove. Wheeler and Mix gets an idea to make a fancy restaurant in the shape of a bow tie in between both towns while Camila goes to make more deliveries. Once it is built, Rubble & Crew are pleased that Café Carl likes and so does Camila as Rubble & Crew make themselves dress and act fancy. However, Camila has to make deliveries to Farmer Zoe, Shopkeeper Shelley, and others. To make the fancy food go with Camila, Mix and Charger get the idea to add a drive-thru window to the fancy restaurant.
68b	3b	"The Crew Builds a Castle Show"	Rachel Graham	December 18, 2025	January 2, 2026	401B	N/A
At the Library Tea Shop, Rubble, Mix, Charger, and Wheeler have built new shelves for the new books. Hearing the story of Rapunzel, Rubble hopes to build a castle someday. They find Park Ranger Rose and Rosie who found a book of opera. Park Ranger Rose has a dream to perform an opera before an audience as Rubble & Crew plan to help set up the performance. While the rest of Rubble & Crew look for Rosie, Charger keeps the audience entertained. They find Rosie climbing on top of different buildings. Once Rosie is retrieve, she makes her way to the top of the stage causing Rubble & Crew to build a castle for the opera show so that they can do an opera about climbing called Rose-punzel.
69a	4a	"The Crew Builds a Pirate Ship Café"	Jim Nolan	December 23, 2025	January 16, 2026	403A	N/A
At the lake, Grandpa Gravel is about to read a story to Rubble, Mix, Charger, and Wheeler when they find Café Carl pretending to be a pirate which he originally wanted to do. Mix and Charger get the idea to build a Pirate Ship Café which they will have built at the ocean. Once the pirate ship with a Rubble-type Merpup figurehead is built, Rubble & Crew plan to be the first guests as he serves pirate-themed foods. However, the ocean has choppy waves which makes dining difficult. This causes Rubble & Crew to come up with a construction solution to relocate the Pirate Ship Café to calmer waters with help from Auntie Crane and the Bark Yard Zoomer.
69b	4b	"The Crew Builds a Sierra Sparkle Experience"	Victor Yerrid	December 24, 2025	January 16, 2026	403B	N/A
After repairing the carousel for Grocer Gabriel, Rubble, Mix, Charger, and Wheeler are approached by Sierra Sparkle who states that her new song "Go For It" is coming out and wants to perform it at a Sierra Sparkle Experience where fans can have fun, dance, eat, and watch her perform. Rubble and Mix get the idea to build it into the park. Though self-proclaimed Sierra Sparkle super-fan Speed Meister plans to build his own Sierra Sparkle Experience and creates a diversion by posing as Farmer Zoe and calling Rubble & Crew claiming that Truffles is trapped in the barn. After finding out that they been fooled, Rubble & Crew get contacted by Sierra Sparkle about Speed Meister's not-so-Sparkletastic build causing Rubble & Crew to build a new Sierra Sparkle Experience while carrying its parts on top of their vehicles.
70a	5a	"The Crew Builds a Conveyor Belt Restaurant"	Leah Wolfson	January 30, 2026 (Nick Jr.); February 2, 2026 (Nickelodeon)	March 6, 2026	404A	N/A
At the Bark Yard, Rubble and Charger are preparing to spend the night at Hadley's hotel as they, Mix, and Wheeler are preparing for the upcoming speedwalking race. Upon arrival, they meet up with Coach Karima where Omar, Romar, Mayor Greatway, and Mayor Goodway from Adventure Bay. Unfortunately, Hadley's restaurant doesn't have a restaurant causing Rubble & Crew to come up with a construction solution that involves building a conveyor belt restaurant. Once it is built, it pleases the guests. As eveyone goes to sleep for the speedwalking race, Speed Meister plans to make sure nobody is rested so that he can win by cranking the conveyor belt restaurant into high gear while breaking the lever. This causes Rubble & Crew to fix the lever. Because of the incident, nobody can go back to sleep causing Mix to make a soothing music maker by upgrading the conveyor belt restaurant with it. Note #1: This is the 7th crossover episode. Note #2: This is the 2nd crossover episode that is not a half-hour special.
70b	5b	"The Crew Builds a Community Soup"	Angela M. Sánchez	January 30, 2026 (Nick Jr.); February 3, 2026 (Nickelodeon)	March 6, 2026	404B	N/A
At the Bark Yard, Rubble, Mix, Charger, and Wheeler are preparing to have kibble for breakfast. Unfortunately, Grandpa Gravel has a cold and he can't make Soup for All. Rubble states that they can make the soup instead. Rubble & Crew get carrots, potatoes, celery, tomatoes, corn, and pumpkin from Farmer Zoe's farm. After chopping the vegetables and boiling them, they give it to Grandpa Gravel and soon learn that Soup for All was to be for all of Builder Cove. To rectify this, Charger and Mix come up with the idea to use the Bark Yard's construction equipment to make the soup. Once more vegetables are obtained and subjected to the different construction equipment, they come up with an idea to make a giant pot for the soup and transport it to the park in the Bark Yard Zoomer without spilling it.
71a	6a	"The Crew Fixes the Observatory"	Robin J. Stein	February 4, 2026	March 20, 2026	406A	N/A
On Tool Top Mountain, Fire Captain Catáwi does some fire safety training with Rubble, Mix, Charger, and Wheeler that involves learning how to respond to a forest fire when lost in the woods. They can't view the North Star because the telescope lends at the observatory is cracked. While they await for Camila to bring them a new telescope lens, Rubble & Crew work to remove the cracked telescope lens. Fire Captain Catáwi cautions them not to have the lens in the sunlight or else it would start a fire. Meanwhile, Camila works to find the observatory as the lens she is transporting accidentally starts burning some wood. Rubble & Crew help Fire Captain Catáwi fight the smoke with their vehicles and keep the sunlight from hitting the lens before they can install the new lens in time for the North Star viewing.
71b	6b	"The Crew Builds a Meow Yard"	Evan Konstantopoulos	February 5, 2026	March 20, 2026	406B	N/A
As Rubble, Mix, Charger, and Wheeler are making repairs at the popcorn café, they are asked by Café Carl to watch over his kittens while he is away on a trip. Inspector Inez calls Rubble & Crew stating that she will be coming today to inspect their large equipment where she expects them to be cleaned. When at the Bark Yard, the kittens start to be playful around the equipment as they work to keep the kittens away and work on cleaning the Bark Yard before Inspector Inez shows up. This causes Rubble & Crew to fetch the kittens. With Inspector Inez calling to let them know that she is running early, Mix and Charger get the idea to make a version of the Bark Yard that the kittens can play in as Wheeler calls it the Meow Yard.
72a	7a	"The Crew Builds a Giant Checkerboard"	Diana Aydin	February 6, 2026 (Nick Jr.); February 9, 2026 (Nickelodeon)	April 3, 2026	407A	N/A
Rubble, Mix, Charger, and Wheeler are helping to set up for Builder Cove Checkers Day hosted by Coach Karima so that all the children like Lucas and Lily can play. Camila was enlisted to deliver the checkerboards. However, she only obtained one checkerboard from the game store. Because of this, nobody else can play and Checkers Day will have to be cancelled. Mix and Charger get the idea to build a giant checkerboard for everyone to play. Lucas will represent one team while Lily will represent another team. Once the giant checkerboard is complete, the giant checker pieces prove too heavy for Lucas, Lily, and the other kids causing Rubble & Crew to add springs, seats with seatbelts, and helmets to the giant checker pieces which Rubble & Crew soon have to pursue when they bounce out of control.
72b	7b	"The Crew Builds a Corn Silo"	Michaela Foster	February 6, 2026 (Nick Jr.); February 10, 2026 (Nickelodeon)	April 3, 2026	407B	N/A
At the Bark Yard, Rubble, Mix, Charger, and Wheeler clean up their pup house. As Wheeler had already cleaned his pup house, he helps the others with theirs. The Bark Screen goes off. While Mix helps Charger with his organizing, Rubble and Wheeler get a call from Farmer Zoe who states that her cornfield has become mysteriously messy. They head to Farmer Zoe's farm. While Farmer Zoe heads into town to deliver some crops, Rubble and Wheeler investigate the messy corn and get the idea to build a corn silo to hold the corn which they have to design without Mix. Once the corn silo is done, Rubble fills the corn silo with the corn piles. Afterwards, Rubble and Wheeler find more corn piles and discover that something is making a mess from within the cornfield.
73a	8a	"The Crew Builds a Soap Box Derby"	Nabeel Arshad	February 7, 2026 (Nick Jr.); February 11, 2026 (Nickelodeon)	April 17, 2026	408A	N/A
At the Bark Yard, Rubble & Crew are holding a Bark Yard Exchange by selling stuff they do not use anymore. Auntie Crane was revealed to have a trophy from a soap box derby when she was a pup. Though Speed Meister wants it and will not return it to Auntie Crane. To prove that he is a fast driver, Speed Meister accepts Auntie Crane's challenge to a race starting at the top of Tool Top Mountain. Rubble & Crew plans to build a fast soap box car for Auntie Crane. Spying on Rubble & Crew, Speed Meister steals the wooden building supplies. When Rubble & Crew find all the wood gone, Auntie Crane leads them in recycling the items from the Bark Yard Exchange to build a soap box car.
73b	8b	"The Crew Builds a Bird Flight School"	Jordan Gershowitz	February 12, 2026	April 17, 2026	408B	N/A
At the airport, Rubble, Mix, Charger, and Wheeler have completed the indoor skydiving center maintenance check. During the final parts, Wingsy doesn't see the clean glass and crashes. This causes Wingsy to hurt her wing as Rubble & Crew bring him to Dr. Diwa. She mentions that crashing into glass items can injure birds and figures out why Wingsy can't fly which is when she got scared of flying. Rubble & Crew are enlisted to get Wingsy flying again in a location that is safe. Mix suggests having the indoor skydiving center act as a bird flight school. Once it is complete, a pair of wings are built for Wheeler to help Wingsy get adjusted to the bird flight school.
74a	9a	"The Crew Builds a Pancake Café"	Peter Hunziker	February 13, 2026 (Nick Jr.); February 16, 2026 (Nickelodeon)	May 1, 2026	409A	N/A
Rubble, Mix, Charger, and Wheeler have completed the car wash repairs. Afterwards, Mayor Greatway states that today is Pancake Celebration Day and entered Builder Cove into a contest judge by Inspector Inez to make the biggest pancake with all of Builder Cove helping out. Café Carl will be making the pancake, but he doesn't have a place big enough to make it. Charger and Mix get the idea to turn Café Carl's pizza parlor into a pancake café. Displeased that he didn't asked to participate, Speed Meister plans to ruin Pancake Celebration Day. Once the pancake café is complete, Speed Meister sabotages the spring-loaded pancake flipper with a mega spring to send it out of Builder Cove and switch out Farmer Zoe's maple syrup with car wash soap until he overhears what Mayor Greatway wanted him to do and starts to regret his actions.
74b	9b	"The Crew Builds an Airplane Wash"	Omali Jeffers	February 13, 2026 (Nick Jr.); February 17, 2026 (Nickelodeon)	May 1, 2026	409B	N/A
At the car wash following a rainstorm, Rubble, Mix, Charger, and Wheeler fix the car wash's animal wash form so that Farmer Zoe can get Truffles cleaned up. Afterwards, they see the same ducks that flew by this winter and are en route to their home as they end up landing at the Builder Cove School. Park Ranger Rose explains that the ducks on the mural are mistaken for real ducks. Rubble calls up Camila to have her airplane turned into a duck plane again. As Camila flies the duck plane, the mud from the ducks' feet have covered the windshield enough for her to be unable to see. To remedy this, Charger and Mix get the idea to make an aerial version of a car wash using the leftover supplies from the car wash. Then they get a bunch of balloons to float the plane wash up into the air while having to guide Camila to it.
75a	10a	"The Crew Builds a Farmyard Skatepark"	Joey Clift	February 14, 2026 (Nick Jr.); February 18, 2026 (Nickelodeon)	May 22, 2026	410A	N/A
At the skatepark, Rubble, Mix, and Charger have set up for River's skate date where they are giving everyone lessons. Wheeler arrives stating that he is delivering some corn feed to Farmer Zoe's animals and takes a break to try to do some skateboarding only for the corn feed to spill everywhere when his skateboard strikes his dump truck. As a solution, Wheeler has Truffles, Benny, Lenny, Jenny, Mooreen, and Rosie eat the corn feed. Once the corn feed is cleaned up everywhere, another complication arrives when Farmer Zoe's animals get on the skateboards causing them to hog the skatepark. To remedy this, Mix and Charger get the idea to build a skatepark at Farmer Zoe's farm. Once that is done, Rubble & Crew must work to bring the farm animals to the farmyard skatepark
75b	10b	"The Crew Builds a Room with a View"	Lucas Mills	February 14, 2026 (Nick Jr.); February 19, 2026 (Nickelodeon)	May 22, 2026	410B	N/A
At Hotel Hadley, Rubble, Mix, Charger, and Wheeler have fixed a loose railing. After helping the different guests to his hotel, Hadley tells him that he prides himself in his service while joking that disatisfied customers can have Hotel Hadley. Speed Meister takes advantage of this by having Hadley do all of his requests or else he will take over Hotel Hadley and rename it Motel Meister. Hadley takes different requests from Speed Meister like fried pickles from a fried pickle dispenser, a king-size bunk bed to share with Mr. McTurtle, and a boombox playing the McTurtle Remix. Rubble & Crew help Hadley out with each request. When it comes to Speed Meister's latest request in the form of a room with a view of the beach and that there is no room facing the beach, Mix gets the idea of building a pretend beach in front of Hotel Hadley with help from the Bark Yard Zoomer.
76	11	"The Crew & Everest Build a Snow Castle"	Evan Sinclair	TBA	November 13, 2026	411	TBD
Everest comes to Builder Cove to judge the snow building contest at the Bark Yard. But some big thumping has been knocked down everyone’s snow sculptures. Rubble & Crew with help from Everest investigate of the creature making those thumps know as Jumbo Paws. Note #1: This is the 8th crossover episode. Note #2: This is the only half-hour episode in this season.
77a	12a	"The Crew Builds a Houseboat"	Eva Konstantopoulos	May 3, 2026 (Nick Jr.); May 4, 2026 (Nickelodeon)	June 12, 2026	412A	N/A
Omar's family has called Rubble, Mix, Charger, and Wheeler to their house for a big project. What they need help with is a big decision on their family vacation. While Omar and Lily want to do either a river cruise or a safari, Juniper and Lucas want to have a staycation so that they can relax. This leads Rubble & Crew divided until they come up with a compromise that involves Rubble & Crew turning their garage into a houseboat that will go down the river. Once the houseboat is built and placed in the river, Omar's family sets sail. Unfortunately, Rubble & Crew must intervene by keeping Crunchy the Beaver from gnawing on the houseboat, getting the houseboat around rocks, and converting the Duck Bridge in a drawbridge.
77b	12b	"The Crew Builds a Spa"	Harron Atkins	May 3, 2026 (Nick Jr.); May 5, 2026 (Nickelodeon)	June 12, 2026	412B	N/A
As Rubble, Mix, Charger, and Wheeler work on fixing a part of a sidewalk, Mix finds that she forgot to load the concrete. Auntie Crane then shows up with the concrete which is used to fix the sidewalk. Due to her also being helpful to Grandpa Gravel, Park Ranger Rose, and Juniper with their stuff, Charger wishes that there would be a way to allow a day for Auntie Crane a day to relax which gives Mix an idea of turning Shopkeeper Shelley's hair salon into a doggy day spa. With Shopkeeper Shelley's approval, Rubble & Crew work on turning the hair salon into a spa. Meanwhile, Speed Meister gets jealous of Auntie Crane's hard work and plans to ruin her spa day so that he can use the spa for himself while unaware of the times of that Auntie Crane helped him out.
78a	13a	"The Crew Builds a Sporting Goods Store"	Sam Bissonnette	May 4, 2026 (Nick Jr.); May 6, 2026 (Nickelodeon)	July 17, 2026	413A	N/A
At the Bark Yard, Coach Karima oversees a volleyball game between Rubble, Mix, Charger, and Wheeler. When Charger's Jump-Jump-Jumpies ends up accidentally deflating the volleyball, Coach Karima takes them to get a new ball only for Shopkeeper Shelley to mention that he doesn't sell other sports equipment as Omar (who needs a kickball for Lily), Farmer Zoe (who needs a soccer ball for her and Truffles to practice with), and Mayor Greatway (who needs a tennis racket for her tennis match with Mayor Goodway) want their respective sports equipment. To rectify this, Coach Karima helps Shopkeeper Shelley with sports as Mix comes up with an idea for them to run a sporting goods store. Once it is built, Rubble and Mix observe that Shopkeeper Shelley and Wheeler like things neat and Coach Karima and Charger make a mess causing Rubble & Crew to come up with a construction solution involving Coach Karima's sports base being underground.
78b	13b	"The Crew Plays Construction Vehicle Soccer"	Scott Gray	May 4, 2026 (Nick Jr.); May 7, 2026 (Nickelodeon)	July 17, 2026	413B	N/A
At the Bark Yard, Rubble, Mix, Charger, and Wheeler are setting up for Coach Karima's soccer camp. Then Rubble & Crew get a call from Farmer Zoe who states that Grocer Gabriel is having a watermelon celebration at his grocery store and that she needs help transporting her larger watermelon to Grocer Gabriel's grocery store. The transportation of the giant-size watermelon attracts the attention of three squirrels who make off with the giant-size watermelon. Coach Karima is enlisted to help Rubble & Crew reclaim the giant-size watermelon as a team which becomes what they call construction vehicle soccer. Once that was done, Rubble & Crew must come up with a construction solution to keep the giant-size watermelon from crashing into Grocer Gabriel's grocery store.

=== Season 5 (2026) ===
No. overall	No. in season	Title	Written by	U.S. air date	Canadian air date	Prod. code	U.S. viewers (millions)
79a	1a	"The Crew Builds a Stadium Dome"	Bradley Zweig	May 10, 2026 (Nick Jr.); May 11, 2026 (Nickelodeon)	September 12, 2026	501A	N/A
At the Bark Yard, Rubble, Mix, Charger, and Wheeler are working on a stage for the Builder Cove Sensational Sing-Off Competition. They are visited by Mayor Greatway and Mr. Ducky Doo who have the trophy for the Builder Cove Sensational Sing-Off Competition. Meanwhile, Speed Meister practices his song about fried pickles when he sees Park Ranger Rose, Rosie, Dr. Diwa, and Rubble & Crew rehearsing. With everyone being more better than him at singing, Speed Meister gets the idea from the previous rain at the baseball stadium. After performing, Speed Meister uses the Speedy-Copter disguised as a raincloud to improvise rain. Not wanting the competition to be cancelled, Mix and Charger get the idea to make a retractable umbrella-shaped stadium dome to keep the rain out.
79b	1b	"The Crew Builds a Baggage Claim"	Jim Nolan	May 10, 2026 (Nick Jr.); May 12, 2026 (Nickelodeon)	September 12, 2026	501B	N/A
Camila flies her airplane into the airport with Rubble, Mix, Charger, and Wheeler back from vacation. As they go to get their suitcases with Rubble's suitcase containing a surprise for Auntie Crane, they find a lot of luggage from the other passengers due to the fact that Builder Cove has been growing. Mix and Charger come up with idea to have the airport upgraded with a baggage claim. As Camila leaves to go pick up more passengers, Rubble contacts Auntie Crane to being the Bark Yard Zoomer to help out with the construction. Once the baggage claim is done, Camila returns with more passengers as they claim their suitcases. Unfortunately, more bags aren't coming out because Camila is still unloading all luggage and has to take them to the terminal causing Rubble & Crew to come up with a construction solution to get the luggage to the baggage claim.
80a	2a	"The Crew Builds Sierra Sparkle's Bedroom"	Michaela Foster	May 11, 2026 (Nick Jr.); May 13, 2026 (Nickelodeon)	September 14, 2026	502A	N/A
At the Bark Yard, Rubble, Mix, Charger, and Wheeler are washing Grandpa Gravel's food truck as Charger does some dancing just in case Sierra Sparkle needs a backup dancer. They soon get a call from Sierra who invites them for a sleepover. Upon arrival at the grocery store, Rubble & Crew make their way to the second floor where Sierra's bedroom is where she shows them around and introduces them to her teddy bear Snuggly Sparkle. While Sierra has admitted that she hasn't had time to decorate her bedroom to be bright and sparkly complete with a space to practice her songs, Rubble & Crew make plans to rebuild the bedroom to Sierra's expectations while she is away getting them smoothies. Once the bedroom has been rebuilt, Rubble & Crew look for Snuggly Sparkle after Charger moved it to keep out of the way of their construction and must find it before Sierra gets back.
80b	2b	"The Crew Builds a Water Ski Jump"	Evan Sinclair	May 11, 2026 (Nick Jr.); May 14, 2026 (Nickelodeon)	September 15, 2026	502B	N/A
At the Library Tea Shop, Grandpa Gravel read a book of amazing sports stunts to Rubble, Mix, Charger, Wheeler, Motor, and Auntie Crane after using the Puppy Pyramid move to get it down. They come across a page involving the Amazing Moto Mabel doing her water ski jump called the Water Ramp Blast-O as Charger recalls that Mabel is Mayor Greatway's grandmother. As Mayor Goodway and Chickaletta are coming to Builder Cove, Rubble, Mix, Charger, and Wheeler hear about Mayor Greatway doing new stunt performances to wow her and pitch the idea to recreate the Water Ramp Blast-O. They work to build water skis and a water ramp that will be brought to the beach with help from Auntie Crane. When at the beach, Mayor Greatway steps on a stray coconut from near the Smoothie Shop and injures her ankle causing Rubble & Crew to come up with a construction solution involving putting a beach chair on a floating platform and making sure the performance is seen by Mayor Goodway and Chickaletta. Note #1: This is the 9th crossover episode. Note #2: This is the 3rd crossover episode that is not a half-hour special.
81a	3a	"The Crew Builds a Rock-Climbing Wall"	Angela M. Sànchez	July 10, 2026	September 16, 2026	503A	N/A
While one their way to Coach Karima, Rubble, Mix, Charger, and Wheeler encounter Speed Meister and his latest Fried Pickle Stand attempt as he hears that they are going to take some rock-climbing lessons from Coach Karima. While ignoring Mix's claim that rock-climbing is not a competition, Speed Meister plans to climb faster and higher than the pups. As Rubble & Crew meet up with Coach Karima who wants to have an outdoor version of a beginner rock-climbing wall built on a cliff. Once Rubble & Crew finish the rock-climbing wall, Speed Meister arrives and wants to beat the pups to the top with the Speedy-Copter. When Speed Meister and Mr. McTurtle get stuck at the top, Charger must get over his fear of heights in order to help Rubble use their vehicles to rescue Speed Meister and Mr. McTurtle.
81b	3b	"The Crew Builds a Giant Octo-Sandbox"	Peter Hunziker	July 10, 2026	September 17, 2026	503B	N/A
At the beach, Rubble, Mix, Charger, Wheeler, and Motor meet up with Coach Karima who is hosting Builder Cove Beach Play Day. Each of the pups, Lucas, and Lily want to partake in the activity on the beach. However, Wheeler notices that the water from the high tide is covering the whole beach. Rubble and Mix get the idea to build a giant sandbox in the park. Once the giant sandbox is built and stocked with sand, everyone takes part in Builder Cove Beach Play Day. Shopkeeper Shelley shows up to partake in beach bowling which causes it to become crowded even when Farmer Zoe and her farm animals and Mayor Greatway join in. This causes Rubble & Crew to come up with a construction solution by turning the sandbox into an octopus-themed sandbox upon being inspired by Mayor Greatway's octo-lounge.
82a	4a	"The Crew Builds a Fish Ladder"	Joey Clift	July 17, 2026	September 18, 2026	504A	N/A
Fire Captain Catáwi takes junior firefighters Rubble, Mix, Charger, and Wheeler to the dam to do a safety check and clean it up while checking for any cracks. Overhearing Fire Captain Catáwi calling Rubble & Crew the best helpers ever, Speed Meister plans to be better as he instructs Mr. McTurtle to turn the water on to maximum so that he can clean the dam first. This doesn't go well. Fire Captain Catáwi soon finds a salmon near the dam as it is trying to swim upriver in order to lay eggs. To help the salmon get over the dam, Rubble & Crew plan to come up with a construction solution. Speed Meister plans to lift the salmon over the dam in a barrel with the Speedy-Copter which doesn't go well. After the salmon are rescued, Rubble & Crew place the salmon on the other side of the dam and work on getting the rest of the salmon over the dam by building a fish ladder.
82b	4b	"The Crew Builds a Construction Carnival"	Sindy Boveda Spackman	July 17, 2026	TBA	504B	N/A
The first ever Builder Cove carnival is being held in the park as Rubble, Mix, Charger, Wheeler, and Motor are prepared for it. When Motor learns that one of the carnival games will have a Super Squirrely Whirly plush toy for a prize, Speed Meister wants to win it before Motor can. Camila arrives stating that she did get prizes, but everything else was sent to the wrong town. Rubble & Crew come up with a construction solution by having a construction carnival at the Bark Yard. They build stuff like a claw game modeled after Charger's crane, a whac-a-nail game, and a ring the bell game. Once the construction carnival is set up, Camila states that 100 tickets are needed to win the giant Super Squirrely Whirly plush toy. Motor competes against Speed Meister to see who will get 100 tickets first.
83a	5a	"The Crew Builds a Cooking Store"	Robin J. Stein	July 24, 2026	TBA	505A	N/A
At the Bark Yard, Rubble, Mix, Charger, and Wheeler are attracted to Grandpa Gravel cooking his famous Kibble 'n' Pasta Sauce which is almost done. The pups pass the time by making noodle art with some of Grandma Gravel's noodles as Mix gets stumped on hers. After Grandpa Gravel accidentally burns the pasta and is out, Mix calls Camila to bring Grandpa Gravel a big box of pasta. With the pot also ruined, Grandpa Gravel leads the pups on a shopping errand to procure a new pot. As they visit Shopkeeper Shelley, he also is asked for a ladle from Hadley Hartley and some measuring cups from Juniper. Because Shopkeeper Shelley doesn't have a store that sells cooking supplies, Rubble comes up with a construction solution to build him a cooking store. Once it is built, Mix gets the idea to make use of the giant pastas that Camila unknowingly brought to decorate the cooking store.
83b	5b	"The Crew Builds a Food Truck Zipline"	Jim Nolan	July 24, 2026	TBA	505B	N/A
Rubble, Mix, Charger, and Wheeler have set up for Fun Day in the Park where Grandpa Gravel will be providing the food. Unfortunately, the parking spot for Grandpa Gravel's food truck has been taken over by Speed Meister's Speedy Food Truck so that he can Mr. McTurtle can cook fried pickles on a bun. As Speed Meister won't move and claims that he is a better and faster cook, this leads to Grandpa Gravel challenging Speed Meister to a food truck race. Whoever makes 50 hot dogs and makes it back to the park wins will get the spot and cook for Fun Day in the Park. With Rubble riding with Grandpa Gravel to make the hot dogs, Speed Meister cheats by spilling pickle juice and detouring them off the path. When the latter happens and Grandpa Gravel drives up the mountain, Rubble comes up with a construction solution to build a special food truck zipline upon enlisting the rest of the pups to help.
84a	6a	"The Crew Builds a Magical Doctor's Office"	Angela M. Sánchez	July 31, 2026	TBA	506A	N/A
In the park, Rubble, Mix, Charger, Wheeler, and Motor are with Omar, Lucas, Lily, and the other children where they are about to see a magic show by the magician Mariana Magica who shows off her magic tricks. When Lily injures her wrist, Mariana reveals that she also works as a doctor where she treats Lily's wrist much to Lucas' discomfort. Omar states that Lucas and Lily are due for the checkup and Dr. Magica doesn't have an office in Builder Cove and their usual doctor is in Adventure Bay. This gives Rubble a construction solution to build a doctor's office which makes Lucas even more nervous than usual. Rubble & Crew work on building a doctor's office. Once it is built and the inside is set up, everyone realizes Lucas escaped, Rubble & Crew must work to get Lucas over his nervousness of the checkup by making the doctor's office into a magical doctor's office.
84b	6b	"The Crew Builds a Trip to the Moon"	Jordan Gershowitz	July 31, 2026	TBA	506B	N/A
Grandpa Gravel takes Rubble, Mix, Charger, and Wheeler to the science center where it has a new Moon exhibit. They learn that Grandpa Gravel in his youth has been to the Moon because someone had to make space food for the astronauts while also showing footage of his moonwalk and revealing that he found a moon rock. As Grandpa Gravel goes to look for his hold helmet, Rubble and Mix get the idea to build a pretend Moon for Grandpa Gravel in the Bark Yard to relive his Moon trip on. Once it is done, Rubble & Crew come up with an idea to make the fake Moon enable Grandpa Gravel float and bounce that involves placing the fake Moon on giant springs which becomes complicated when Wingsy snatches the fake moon rock. Now Rubble & Crew must work to reclaim the fake moon rock and solve the floating problem before Grandpa Grave arrives.
85a	7a	"The Crew Builds an Underwater Shell Museum"	Eva Konstantopoulos	August 7, 2026	TBA	507A	N/A
At the beach, Rubble, Mix, Charger, and Wheeler are with Park Ranger Rose. During their time at the beach, Wheeler collects some shells and finds a beach cave. Rubble & Crew and Park Ranger Rose explore the cave where they find a giant seashell that is not listed in Wheeler's big book of shells. Mix suggests that it be displayed at the Science Center. When trying to extract the giant seashell, a cave-in is caused. As Park Ranger Rose states that they can't remove the giant seashell without causing a cave collapse, Rubble suggests bringing the people to the giant seashell as they build support beams, fix the cracks, contend with a one crack emitting sea cave. This causes Mix and Charger to build a protective glass and form an underwater shell museum.
85b	7b	"The Crew Builds a Giant Shoe Store"	Diana Aydin	August 7, 2026	TBA	507B	N/A
Rubble, Mix, Charger, and Wheeler see the same ducks migrating when Shopkeeper Shelley steps on some sidewalk gum as Rubble & Crew help free him. With the shoes of Shopkeeper Shelley, Lily, Coach Karima, and Café Carl's respective shoes are getting worn out, Rubble & Crew and Shopkeeper Shelley get the idea to establish a shoe store to accommodate everyone since the other known shoe store is in Adventure Bay. Mix even gets the idea to design it in the shape of a giant shoe. When the shoe store is established and Camila brings the shoes, Wheeler finds six ducks on the store and grab the shoe laces to make their nests instead of migrating. The rest of Rubble & Crew must rescue Wheeler and the shoe store and deal with the ducks.
86	8	"The Crew & Marshall Build a Fire Watch Tower"	Jim Nolan	August 14, 2026	TBA	TBA	N/A
Rubble, Mix, Charger, and Wheeler surprise Fire Captain Catáwi with a pancake breakfast with help from the Builder Cove civilians. Mayor Greatway gives Fire Captain Catáwi the day off to relax and Rubble has called in a "hero" to fill in. Speed Meister hears it from the distance and runs over to the fire station to answer the call only to be told by Rubble that the hero in question is Marshall who ends up meeting Fire Captain Catáwi. As Fire Captain Catáwi goes on a relaxing nature hike, Marshall gives Rubble & Crew the idea to upgrade the fire station with a recreation room on the second floor with help from Auntie Gravel. During his nature hike, Fire Captain Catáwi sees various things on the ground that are a fire hazard as he calls Rubble & Crew and Marshall for help. Speed Meister tries to do the job removing the fire hazard brush which goes awry when his Speedy Leaf Blower Mobile makes it worse. In order to find the embers, Marshall directs Rubble & Crew in putting out the embers. With more embers sighted and disappearing behind the buildings, Fire Captain Catáwi leads Rubble & Crew and Marshall in upgrading the fire station with a fire watch tower to help locate the embers. Note #1: This is the 10th crossover episode.
87a	9a	"The Crew Fixes a Blocked Pipe"	Harron Atkins	August 21, 2026	TBA	TBA	N/A
At the Bark Yard, Rubble, Mix, Charger, and Wheeler are watching Café Carl's kittens for the day. When Charger goes to get the kittens a bowl of water, no water comes out of the faucet. This starts to effect all of Builder Cove where Farmer Zoe needs to wash Truffles in the Pet Wash, Shopkeeper Shelley needs to wash the shampoo off of Omar's hair, and Lucas and Lily need to cool off at the splash pad. With Mix suspecting that something is blocking the main water pipe for all of Builder Cove, Rubble & Crew head out to investigate. With the main water pipe turned off, they need to go inside to find out what's blocking it. Unfortunately, nobody can fit causing Rubble & Crew to see which of the kittens can help them. The kitten Marble wins as they send her into the pipe where they find that Crunchy has built a dam inside.
87b	9b	"The Crew Builds a Construction Basketball Show"	Sam Bissonnette	August 21, 2026	TBA	TBA	N/A
At the drive-in theater, Rubble, Mix, Charger, and Wheeler have finished polishing the disco ball and are hanging it back up. They get news from Coach Karima and Lucas that the Super Hoopsters basketball team is coming to Builder Cove where they are known for their awesome basketball tricks. Because the Super Hoopsters need big spaces to play in and the town's basketball court is not the right size, Rubble gets the idea to have a basketball court inside the baseball stadium complete with the giant disco ball. Complications occur when the Super Hoopsters accidentally arrive in Builder Grove and Charger accidentally caused the giant disco ball to roll off when he gets a status report from Rubble. This causes Rubble & Crew to chase after the giant disco ball which leads to the most unlikeliest way of basketball entertainment for Builder Cove.
88	10	"The Crew Demolishes a Rock Mountain"	Bradley Zweig	November 6, 2026	September 23, 2026 (Netflix)	TBA	TBD
Rubble and his crew are up to demolish Rocks Note #1: This is the first episode of the "Demolishes" episodes. Note #2: This is the 5th half-hour episode that is not a crossover
89a	11a	"The Crew Demolishes a Super Maze"	Jim Nolan	November 13, 2026	September 23, 2026 (Netflix)	TBA	TBD
The Meister Brothers
89b	11b	"The Crew Demolishes Through a Secret Cavern"	Jordan Gershowitz	November 13, 2026	September 23, 2026 (Netflix)	TBA	TBD
90a	12a	"The Crew Demolishes a Soap Factory"	Diana Aydin	November 20, 2026	September 23, 2026 (Netflix)	TBA	TBD
90b	12b	"The Crew Musically Demolishes a Building"	Sindy Boveda Spackman	November 20, 2026	September 23, 2026 (Netflix)	TBA	TBD
91	13	"The Crew Demolishes an Iceberg"	Evan Sinclair	November 27, 2026	October 2, 2026 (Paramount+)	TBA	TBD
Note #1: This is the 11th crossover episode.

=== Season 6 (2026) ===
No. overall	No. in season	Title	Written by	U.S. air date	Canadian air date	Prod. code	U.S. viewers (millions)
92	1	"The Crew Builds a Giant Halloween Pumpkin"	Michaela Foster	October 12, 2026	TBA	601	N/A
It's Halloween in Builder Cove and everyone is sculpting pumpkins. Note #1: This is the 6th half-hour episode that is not a crossover
