= Mechanical horse =

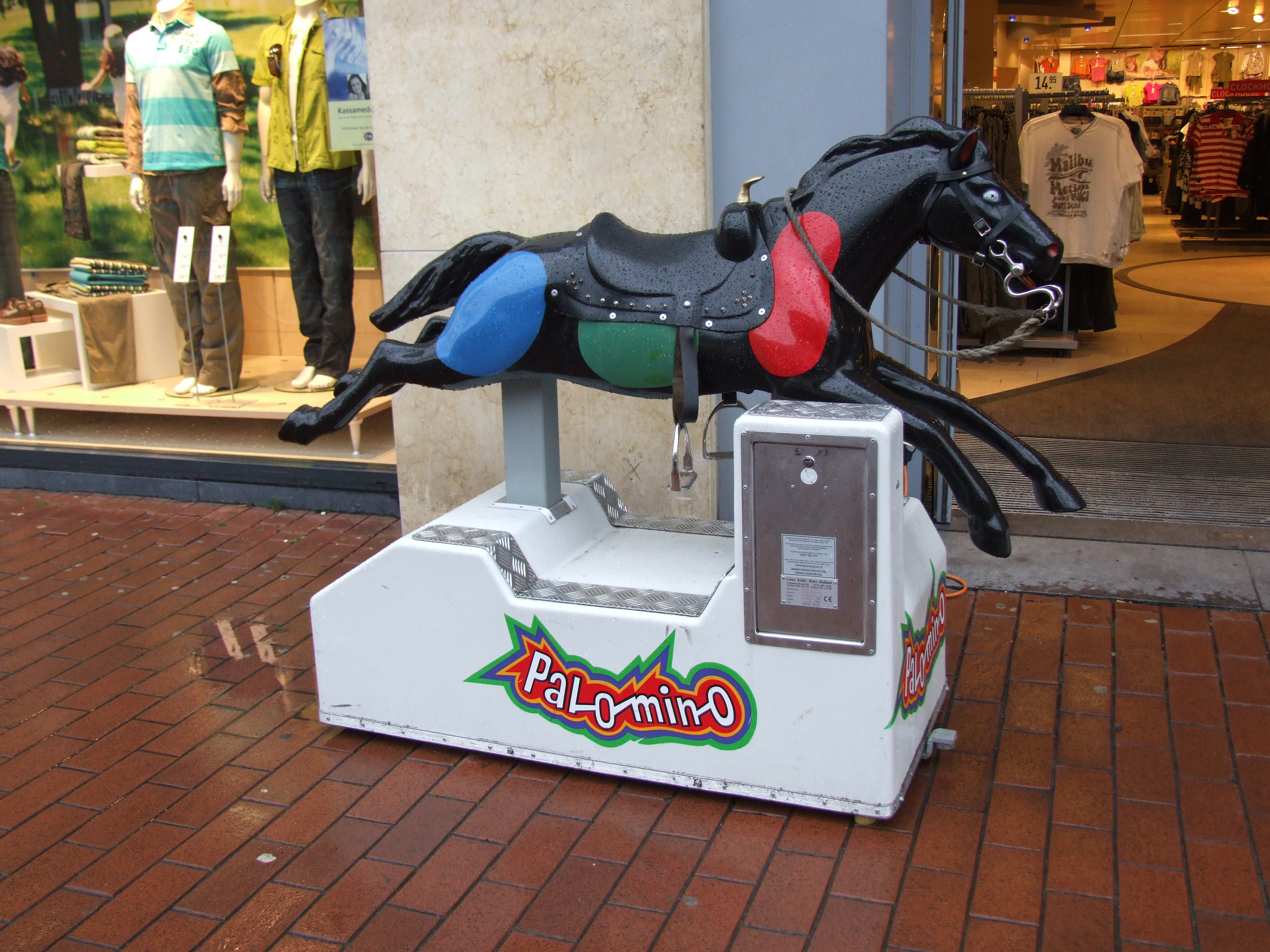
A coin-operated mechanical horse kiddie ride

A mechanical horse is a machine that moved and is built to look like a horse, used either for amusement or for exercise. Some look like a horse, others imitate the motion of a horse, and some are both. Mechanical horses may include the following designs, many of which are patented. One of the first patents was by William Farr Goodwin in 1867, where he filed for a patent for the machine.

It may also mean:

- Merry-go-round
- Equicizer, an American-made horse riding simulator
- Racewood, a British company that manufactures riding simulators
- Scammell Mechanical Horse, a type of lorry built by Scammell in the UK
- A type of kiddie ride that incorporates a horse design
- The Iron Dobbin, an early 20th century rideable mechanical horse

== See also ==
- Mechanical bull, a machine that replicates the sensation of riding a bucking animal
