= Mechanical bull =

Electric bull riding simulator

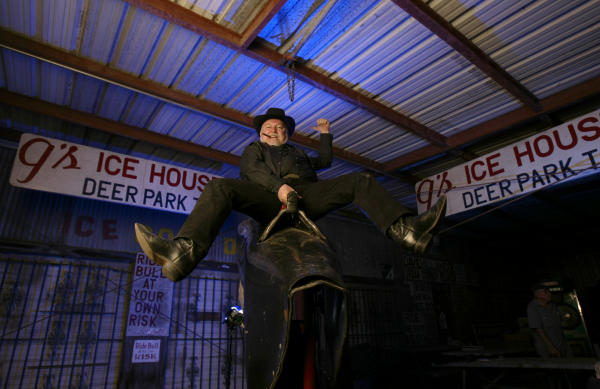
Gator Conley on a mechanical bull

A mechanical bull, also known as a bucking machine, is a device that replicates the sensation of riding a bucking animal, such as a rodeo bull or horse, popularized by Sherwood Cryer. It is usually powered by a variable-speed electric motor. Padded flooring is often installed around the equipment in order to reduce the likelihood of injury to those thrown off it.

A "quick-stop" motor allows the operator to safely control the ride and ensure safety for the rider; this feature allows the operator to stop the ride prior to a rider being thrown. The trained operator at the variable speed control box regulates the unit's buck and spin speeds, as well as spin direction. The equipment has the capability of starting rides very slowly, and speeds can be advanced according to a rider's ability. It can go slowly and simply spin for beginners and run at greater speed for experts.

Prior to the development of a bucking machine a simpler device was created by attaching ropes (sometimes a rope-and-pulley system) to the ends of a large barrel, suspending it from four points, often tall posts or the rafters of a barn. A saddle or bucking equipment would be added, and then a rider would straddle the barrel. Two to four other people would move the barrel by pulling on the ropes to emulate the movement of an animal. This "bucking barrel" is still also used as a less-expensive option for practice and entertainment.

Mechanical bulls have existed for decades as training devices for rodeo competitors, as they enable a rider of (bucking horses and bulls) to enhance rodeo performance and refine skills without the risk and unpredictability of a live animal. Although mechanical bulls are still routinely used for rodeo training, they are also utilized as an amusement ride, both as a mobile rental (i.e., party entertainment) and as stationary entertainment, the latter found in bars, restaurants, and clubs; for safety these may be surrounded by foam pits or blown-air inflated structures similar to "bounce houses". There is a modified, less dangerous style used for children's parties, usually with a one-minute timer. Children remove their shoes to get on. They hold a rope or peg on the shoulder or neck of the machine, and the person who stays on for the whole minute without falling off wins a small prize.

As a form of entertainment, the mechanical bull often includes a saddle (used only in saddle bronc riding, not bareback or bull riding) and often a model head of a bull, complete with horns. One of the earliest uses as a form of entertainment was at Bertrand Island Amusement Park in New Jersey), where a mechanical bucking bronco ride was introduced in the 1930s, under the name of "Ride 'Em Cowboy!".

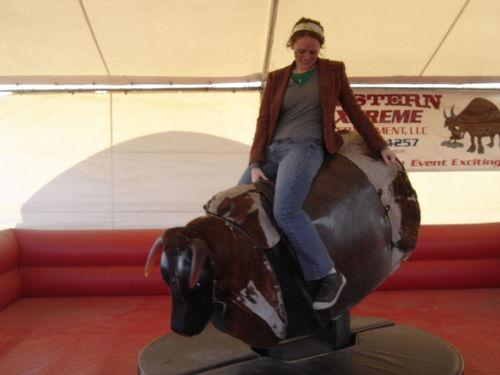
A woman riding on a mechanical bull

The mechanical bull as an entertainment device as well as the commercial use of mechanical bulls gained popular appeal with the release of the 1980 movie Urban Cowboy. In this movie John Travolta and Debra Winger demonstrated the art of riding a mechanical bull to the larger movie-going population. The mechanical bull featured in this movie was the El Toro brand. This brand of mechanical bull is still used but does not carry the same safety features as are available on more recent models.

Bucking bronco and bronc are cowboy slang for a horse that throws a person around.

== Cultural references ==
Mechanical bulls can be seen in the films Urban Cowboy, Stir Crazy, Charlie's Angels: Full Throttle, and Sonic the Hedgehog. In the movie Barnyard, in the night barn, a "Mechanical Man" is seen (as the main characters are cows). In the television show Strangers with Candy, Jerri Blank's P.E. class is seen to have mechanical bull riding. Madonna's music video for her 2000 single Don't Tell Me includes footage of her riding a mechanical bull at the end of the video. Feeder's 2012 music video for their single "Idaho", features actor Daniel Mays riding a mechanical bull, too. James Spader rode one in Boston Legal "Death Be Not Proud" episode, aired in 2005. The character Petra tried riding one in Jane the Virgin, only to fall off and lose a tooth. A mechanical bull riding competition serves as a plot point in the television show Patriot.

== Safety ==
Although injuries from mechanical bulls are relatively rare, there are a variety of ways that a person can be injured while riding a mechanical bull. These injuries can be caused by falling on the ground, striking the bull or getting caught on it, or injuries caused by the bucking motion. In 2003 a 28-year-old man was paralyzed after being thrown from a mechanical bull at a county fair. He sued for $50 million in damages claiming that the ride was deceptive because there was no warning about the steel frame underneath the pad that the man struck when he was thrown from the bull. Because of the risk of injury many venues require varying levels of insurance coverage to keep themselves protected. There are also very few insurance companies that will insure mechanical bulls because of the risk involved.

There are, however, mechanisms in the bulls that keep the risk of injury much lower. Many of the bulls have continuous pressure airbags, rounded padded body designs, and controls that control the speed and bucking motion. Operator training on safety is provided through some of the insurance companies that insure mechanical bulls.

== See also ==
- Equicizer
- Racewood
