= Equicizer =

Mechanical horse

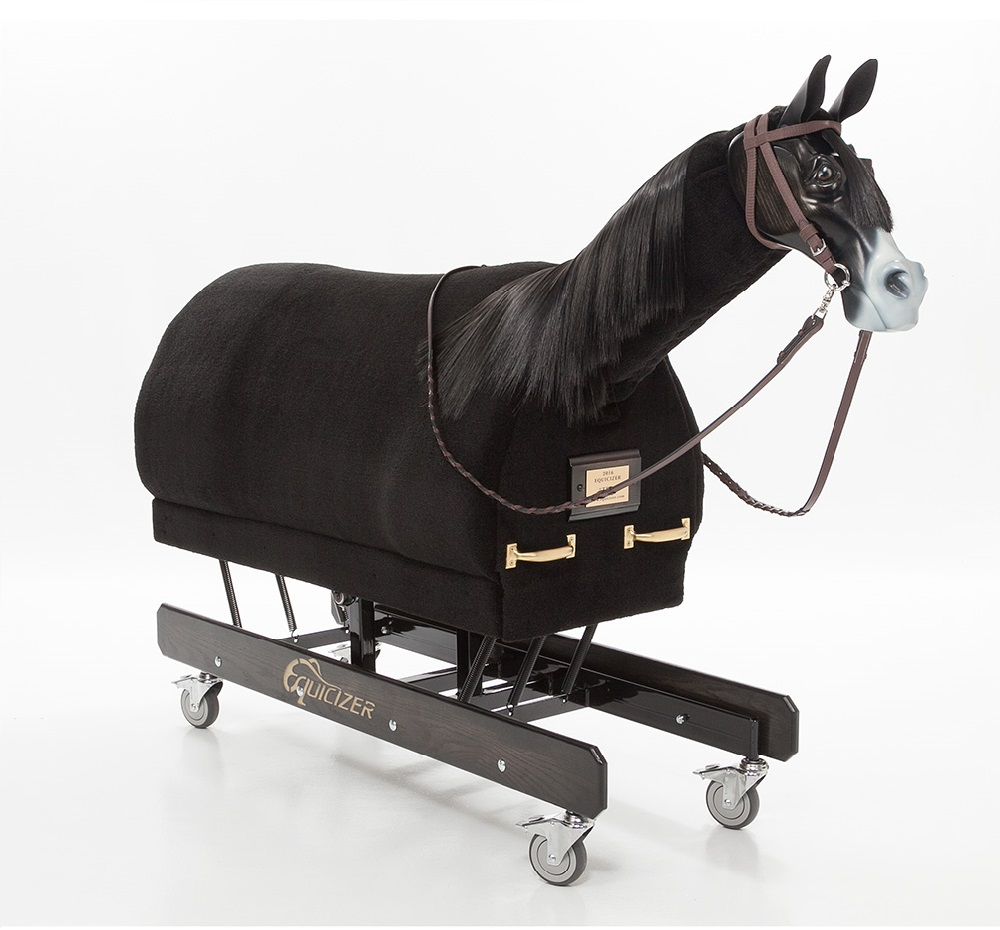
Equicizer mechanical horse-riding simulator

The Equicizer is a mechanical horse that is non-motorized and is controlled by the rider's movement. Invented by Frank Lovato, Jr. in 1982, it is used by people all over the world for exercise, training and therapy. It has been used in many television and movie productions, including the movie Seabiscuit for close-up horse racing scenes and the 2019 Australian film Ride Like a Girl, a sports biography with jockey Michelle Payne. TV appearances include the talk show Harry, with Harry Connick Jr, the US series Big Brother, and The Ellen DeGeneres Show.

== Origins ==
Lovato built his first non-motorized mechanical horse in 1982 while recovering from a riding accident that left him with a seriously broken leg. There were no horse riding simulators on the market at the time, and so he designed one for his rehabilitation. As word got out about his invention, Lovato began receiving requests from other jockeys to build more, and the design evolved into the Equicizer. The Equicizer is now used all over the world by equestrians and non-equestrians alike. In 2011 he sold the Equicizer to a company called Equisense to be manufactured and marketed more widely. This was not accomplished, and in March 2014 Lovato re-purchased the Equicizer brand and business under his Wooden Horse Corporation, located in Norwalk, Ohio.

== Construction and operation ==
Crafted entirely by hand, the Equicizer has a wooden body resembling the back of a horse in size and shape, covered with padding and carpet, upon which a saddle or bareback pad is placed. The head is hand-carved to look like a real horse, and the neck moves independently of the body. The Equicizer has a spring-balanced mechanism that is easily activated and controlled according to the rider's level of effort and fitness. When in motion, the Equicizer simulates the movements of a real horse, allowing riders to exercise, practice technique, and improve body posture and positioning, fitness, and confidence in a safe, controlled manner.

== Uses ==
Today, Equicizer users range from intense professional equine athletes to those with severe disabilities, novices, and those who have never ridden a horse. It has been used by riders for styles as varied as dressage, hunting/jumping, western pleasure, endurance, vaulting, polo, and racing, as well as for training by riding instructors, for filmmaking and special effects, and in private homes. It has been used for weight loss, by rehabilitation centers, in therapeutic riding programs, and for hippotherapy, massage therapy and general exercise. Lovato has also used them in his own Jockey Boot Camp to introduce people to the work of a jockey in a safe manner that allows them to develop both basic skills and the required level of physical fitness to ride a real horse. Equicizers were also used in the movie Seabiscuit for all of the closeup racing scenes and in other parts of the film. In 2018 Jockey Mike E. Smith, an Equicizer owner himself, won horse racing's Triple Crown aboard Justify.
