= Racewood =

Company in Britain

Racewood is a company that specialises in creating horse riding simulators, based in Cheshire, England. It was established in 1990.

== Market ==
Racewood simulators are seen in riding schools as well as gyms and tack shops. They are also sometimes brought in to horse expositions and shows, such as the Grand National, the Horse of the Year Show, and the Badminton Horse Trials.

A popular nationwide festival, the National Riding Festival, also uses a Racewood cantering simulator called "Trigger", which appears at every date on the festival tour and at some primary and secondary schools to encourage children to take up horse riding.

In 2023, Scotland's Rural College purchased a £100,000 Racewood simulator for students to practice riding to improve their equestrian performance and safety.
