= Annabel's =

Private members' club in Mayfair, London

Coordinates: 51.5094°N 0.1465°W

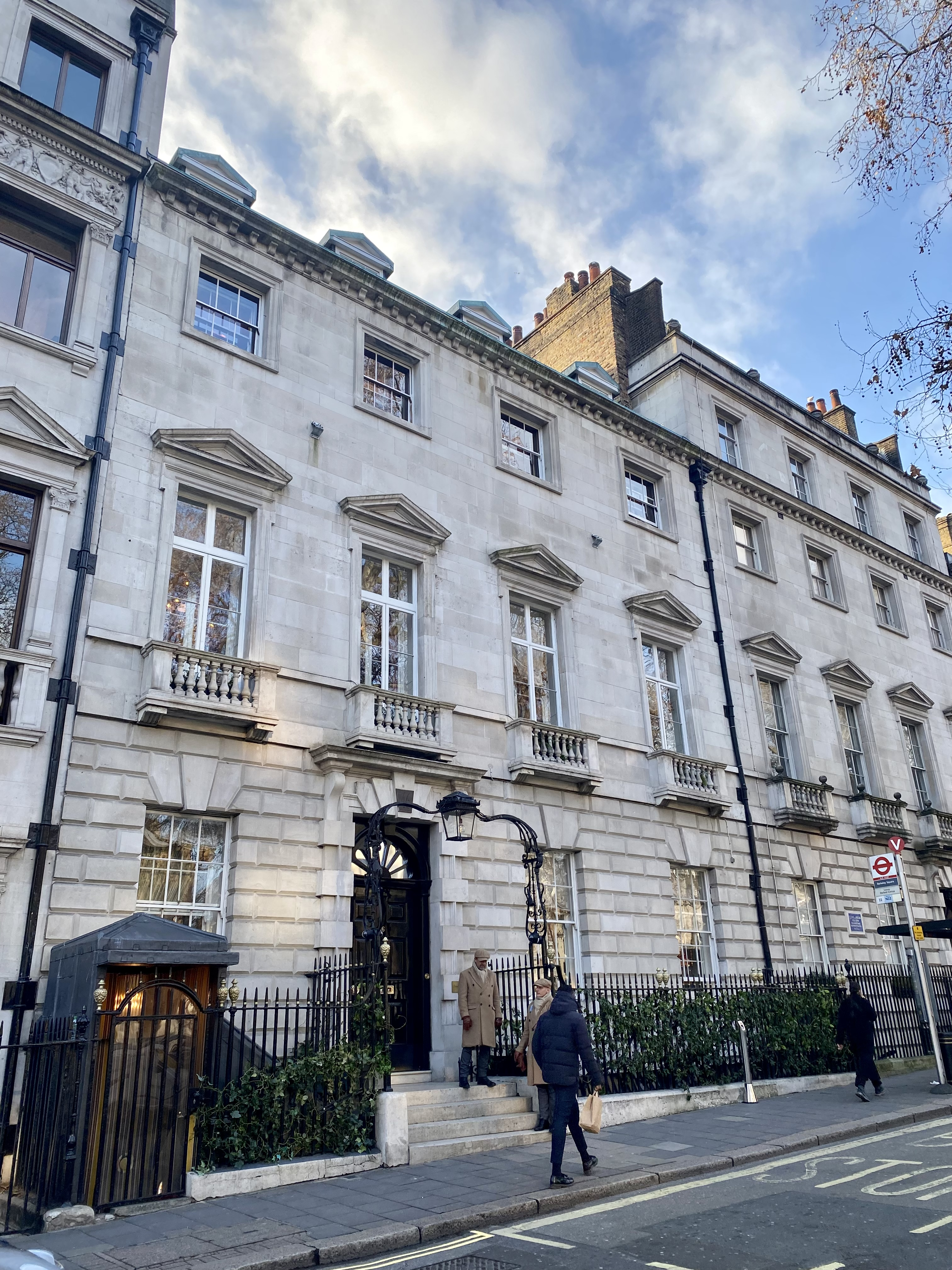
- Annabel's at 46 Berkeley Square in January 2022
- Formation: 1963
- Founder: Mark Birley
- Type: Private members' club
- Location: 46 Berkeley Square, Mayfair, London, England
- Owner: Richard Caring
- Website: www.annabels.co.uk

Annabel's is a private members' club at 46 Berkeley Square in Mayfair, London.

It was opened at 44 Berkeley Square in 1963 by Mark Birley and named for his wife Lady Annabel Vane-Tempest-Stewart. It was founded in the basement of the Clermont Club, a private gambling club established by John Aspinall. Annabel's was one of the first nightclubs in London and was especially popular with the British aristocracy and the international jet-set in the 1960s and 1970s. It was revived by Birley's son and daughter in the 2000s and was sold by Birley with his other members' clubs to Richard Caring in 2007. Annabel's closed at No. 44 Berkeley Square in 2018 and was reopened later that year at No. 46, occupying the entirety of the Georgian townhouse.

== 1963–2007: The Birley Years at 44 Berkeley Square ==
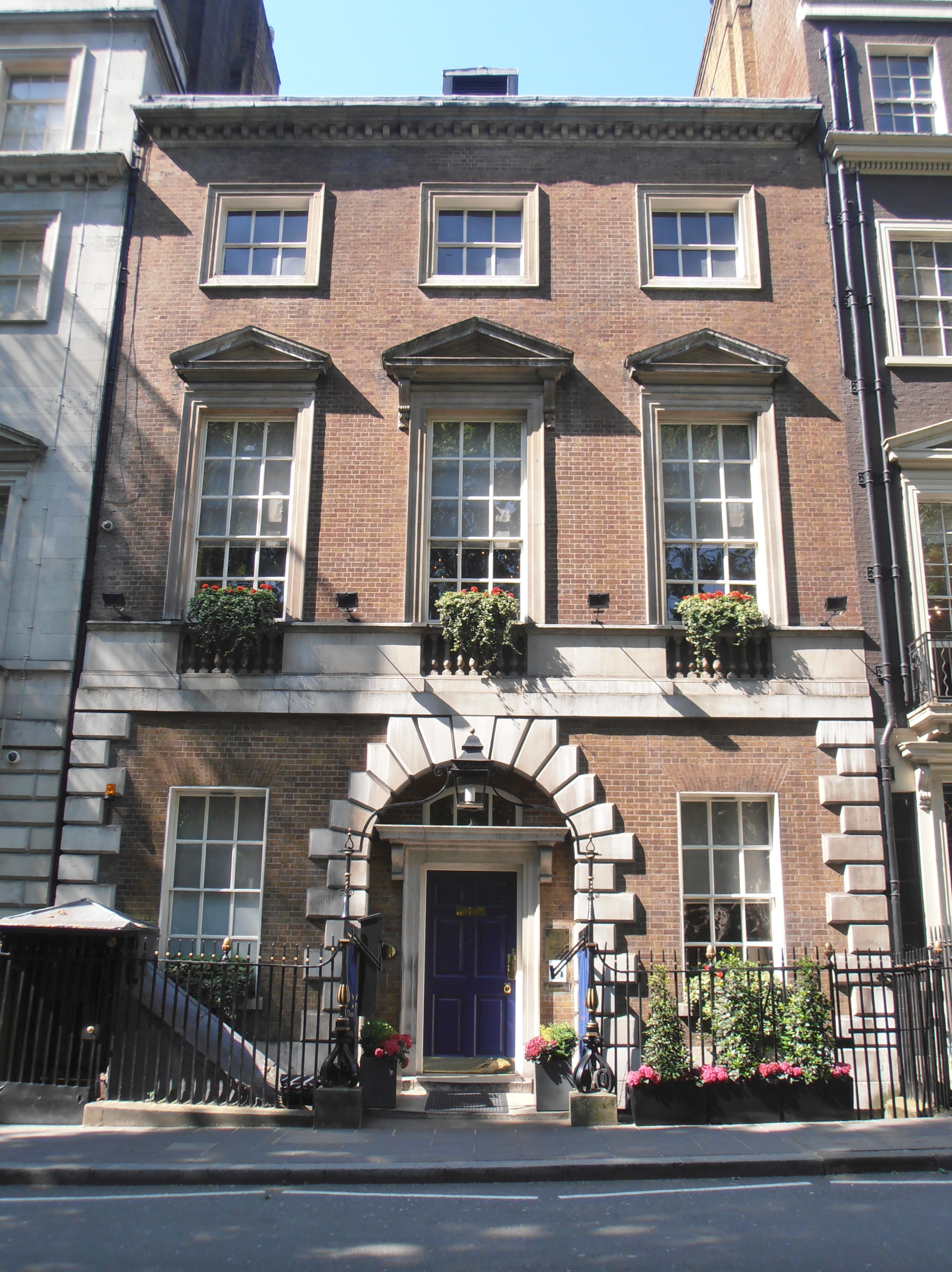
44 Berkeley Square, the site of the Clermont Club. The basement was the location of Annabel's from 1963 to 2018.

=== Establishment and opening ===
In 1962 the Clermont Club, a private gambling club catering to London's high society, was established at 44 Berkeley Square, a townhouse in the Mayfair district of London, in 1962 by John Aspinall. The house was built between 1742 and 1744 by William Kent for Lady Isabella Finch. The Clermont Club was one of the first private gambling clubs in London following the passing of the Betting and Gaming Act 1960.

Aspinall suggested to his friend Mark Birley that he start a piano bar in the extensive vaults and basement of No. 44. Birley himself had intended to start a club after being inspired by the piano bar of the Carlyle Hotel in New York. 6,000 tonnes of London Clay were removed from the basement and garden at the rear of the house to create the principal rooms of the club. The dance floor of the club was the floor from the old kitchen of No. 44. Annabel's was linked to the Clermont Club upstairs by an internal staircase, which was subsequently blocked off by Birley. Birley blocked off the staircase due to his disapproval of Arab gamblers coming down into Annabel's from the Clermont Club in various states of "dress and disorder which jarred with the tone of the nighclub" as recalled by Jonathan Aitken.

Birley named the club for his wife, Lady Annabel Vane-Tempest-Stewart. After almost two years of preparations, the club opened on 4 June 1963, Birley having borrowed £175,000 (equivalent to £3,196,389 in 2025) to establish the club. Lady Annabel herself said that she was not fond of having the club named after her when it first opened but subsequently looks back " ... on [Birley's] decision with pride and consider it the most tremendous compliment he could ever have paid me. Having a nightclub named after you is much better than being immortalised as a rose, which, unlike Annabel's, does not necessarily survive very long". The club became colloquially known by rich debutants as "the 'Bel's".

Annabel's was launched by an opening night party on 4 June 1963. Annabel's had a seating capacity of only 225 people and became quickly overcrowded with Mark and Annabel Birley's friends and their relations. Lady Annabel later wrote that for " ... at least an hour it was bedlam. I had visions of oxygen masks and people being trampled to death" but " ... by the early hours of the morning the crowd miraculously began to melt away, and the rest of the night was magical". Annabel also accidentally insulted the American ambassador to the United Kingdom, David Bruce, and the actor Peter O'Toole by telling them there was no room for them. Lady Annabel recalled that the guests on opening night " ... sounded like a roll call for the pillars of society". (Note: In her 2004 autobiography Annabel: An Unconventional Life, Lady Annabel Goldsmith lists Andrew Cavendish, 11th Duke of Devonshire and Deborah Cavendish, Duchess of Devonshire, Robin Douglas-Home, Mark Dent-Brocklehurst and his wife Mary Elizabeth, Douglas Fairbanks Jr. and his wife Mary Lee Epling, Whitney Straight, Stanisław Albrecht Radziwiłł and Lee Radziwill, Percy Seymour, 18th Duke of Somerset and his wife Jane, Evelyn de Rothschild, Billy Dudley, Drue Heinz, the Maharajah of Jaipur, Tony Lambton, Prince Rupert Loewenstein, Paul Channon, Andrew Parker Bowles, the Plunket brothers (Patrick Plunket, 7th Baron Plunket and Robin Plunket, 8th Baron Plunket), Max Rayne and his wife Lady Jane Vane-Tempest-Stewart (Annabel's sister), Colin Tennant, 3rd Baron Glenconner and Anne Tennant, Baroness Glenconner, and George Weidenfeld as among the guests present at the opening night of Annabel's.) By 5am only Mark and Annabel Birley and James Goldsmith and his girlfriend Sally Crichton Stuart remained on the dancefloor.

Rival high society clubs to Annabel's in the 1960s included Siegi's and Les Ambassadeurs.

Unaccompanied journalists were not allowed in Annabel's except for the gossip columnist Nigel Dempster.

=== Design and decor ===
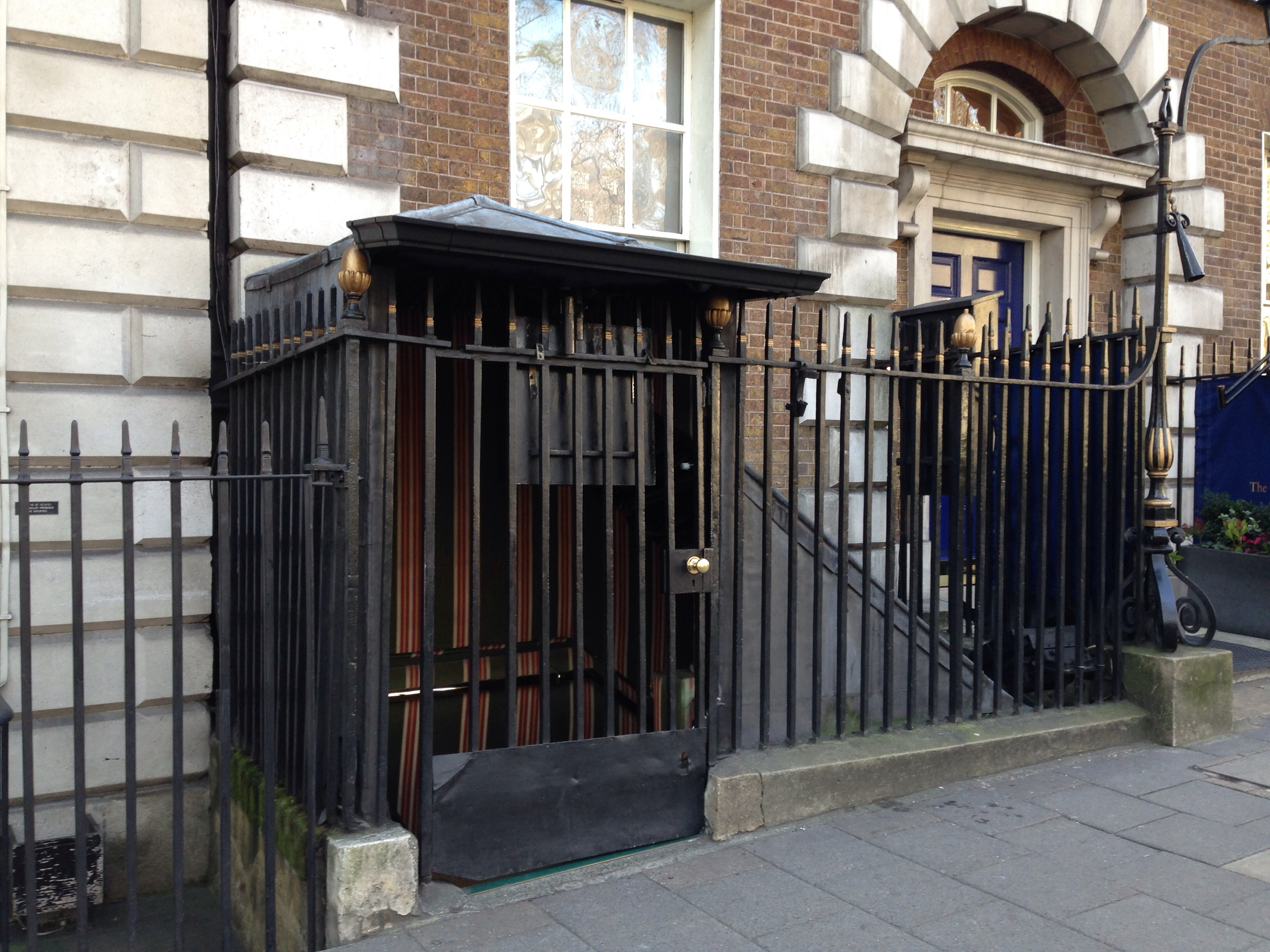
The former entrance to Annabel's

The entrance to the club was through a canopied staircase leading down from Berkeley Square. The canopy was decorated in blue and gold stripes. The staircase led to the lobby of the club, off which were the men's and women's toilets. The men's toilets had a stock ticker machine. The women's toilets were staffed by Mabel James for many decades.

The décor of Annabel's was designed by Birley and Philip Jebb, with subsequent assistance from Nina Campbell. It was described by Harry Mount as having had a "cluttered, eclectic country house look". Plum Sykes described how "Birley's collection of horse and dog paintings and prints covered the walls top to toe; flickering candle lamps lit the tables while guests ate dinner seated on banquettes upholstered in red velvet; the cramped dance floor, almost an afterthought, was hidden at the back of the club and boasted only a couple of disco lights ... Guests felt more like they were at a party in someone's fabulous drawing room than in a London nightclub". Campbell had met Birley in 1965 when she was an assistant to John Fowler, who had decorated the interiors of the Clermont Club. Campbell told Birley that two vitrine units in the bar looked "too tacky" to which Birley responded "'If you think you're so clever, why don't you do them yourself?". Campbell subsequently lined them with a Chinese red silk and put examples of blue and red Imari porcelain on display. Birley was impressed and Campbell began collaborating with him on the decor of the club.

The main sitting area of the club was down the corridor from the lobby with banquettes and sofas. A bar and the room known as the Buddha Room were subsequently created after the entry corridor became too crowded. The Buddha Room was dominated by a wooden Indian sculpture of the Buddha, bought by Birley from Barling of Mount Street. It was painted with a red lacquer and decorated with watercolours and paintings of the Ballets Russes by Pavel Tchelitchew. A private dining room was to the right, established in 1970 from the former mews building of No. 44. The walls of the private dining room were filled from floor to ceiling with wine bottles. The main dining room of the club lay beyond the entrance hallway with the dance floor at its back. The dining room was distinguished by its vaulted ceiling and numerous tables with red and green velvet chairs, each table set with lamps and Limoges china with a flower-pattern. The dining room had a large bar to one side. The supporting pillars of the basement were covered with an antique brass which caused atmospheric reflections contributing to the intimate ambience of the club. Each room had a log fire.

Lady Annabel wrote that Annabel's felt more like a set of "luxurious private sitting rooms than a club". It was decorated with numerous and valuable oil paintings, drawings and photographs with many vases of flowers. The artworks were by many notable artists including Léon Bakst, H. M. Bateman, Edwin Landseer and Alfred Munnings. Some of the artworks in the club had been inherited by Birley from his father, the society portrait artist Oswald Birley. A painting by John Ward of founder members of the club was commissioned to mark the 20th anniversary Annabel's and hung in the dining room of the club. (Note: In her 2004 autobiography Annabel: An Unconventional Life, Lady Annabel Goldsmith lists Louis E, Sidney, and Mark Birley's secretary Perdita, Nolly Zervuadich, Philip Jebb, Michael Brand, Douglas Wilson, Anthony Berry, Prince George Galitzine, David Metcalfe, Peter Blond, Daniel Prean, Peter Munster, Jeremy Tree, Antony Lambton, David Somerset, 11th Duke of Beaufort, Prince Azamat Guirey, Michael Howard, 21st Earl of Suffolk, John Beckwith Smith, John Heinz, Sir Houston Mark Shaw-Stewart, 11th Baronet, William de Gelsey, James Hanson, Baron Hanson, David d'Ambrumenil, William Smith, 4th Viscount Hambleden, Norman Parkinson, as well as Mark Birley and herself being depicted in the painting.)

=== Later years ===
Following the success of Annabel's, Birley opened the private members' clubs Mark's Club in 1972, Harry's Bar, in 1979, the Bath & Racquets Club in 1989, and George in 2001.

Birley placed sandbags outside the club as a precaution against terrorist attacks following the IRA's bombing of Scott's in nearby Mount Street in 1975.

A set of linocuts of scenes from Annabel's by the cartoonist Nicholas Garland was privately published by Birley in 1985, with a foreword by Lucian Freud.

Sarah Ferguson and Diana, Princess of Wales went to Annabel's disguised as police officers a few days before Ferguson's wedding to Prince Andrew in July 1986. The social commentator Peter York said that someone once described Annabel's as being where the "middle-aged meets the Middle East" and that it had represented the "high point of aspiration" in the 1980s but that it was unsustainiable if it only catered to Sloane Rangers.

In the wake of the collapse of Lloyd's of London, Birley banned members from paying on credit. The club was seen as stuffy and old fashioned by the late 1990s with its heyday in the 1970s and 1980s. After suffering a decline in his health and mobility, Birley brought his two children, Robin and India Jane Birley, into the management of the club for the first time. The siblings co-managed Annabel's in the years before Birley's death in 2007. Robin ran the company and India Jane, responsible for the look and decoration of the club, redesigned and relaunched Annabel's with Robin in 2003. Their changes led to the arrival of a younger crowd to the club and the revival of its popularity. Annabel's marked its 40th anniversary in 2003 with two dinners attended by 125 founder members among 320 guests hosted by Mark Birley and Lady Annabel Goldsmith. Barry Humphries wrote and performed a special song about Annabel's on both nights in character as Dame Edna Everage. Queen Elizabeth II visited the club in 2003 for a dinner to celebrate the 70th birthday of one of her Ladies of the Bedchamber, Virginia Ogilvy, Countess of Airlie. It was the first time that the Queen had been in a nightclub since she was married. The Queen drank a gin martini (without lemon). Belinda Harley's book about Annabel's was published in 2006.

In 2004 India Jane became pregnant and Robin paid former London police officers who claimed to be private detectives more than £400,000 from the accounts of Annabel's in exchange for false information about her then partner, and the father of her child, Robert Macdonald. The investigation was to establish whether Macdonald had a financial motive behind his relationship with India Jane. Mark Birley fell out with Robin following the revelation. Mark Birley sacked Robin from the management of his clubs after the fall out from the affair. Robin subsequently said that he felt he was "acting in the best interest of my sister ... My father was too ill at the time to have any additional worries". Macdonald later received an official apology from Robin and had all his legal bills paid with an additional cash settlement. Robin apologised to his sister and admitted that he had been mistaken in pursuing the investigation. India Jane Birley solely managed the club in 2006 after her estrangement from her brother, and left the management of her father's clubs after their 2007 sale.

=== Music and entertainment ===
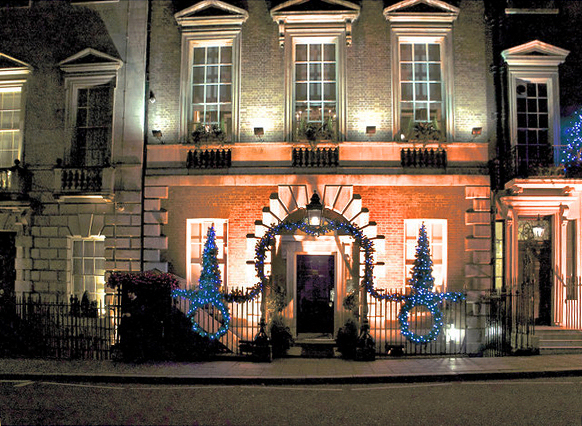
The former entrance to Annabel's (left, with doorman) in 2014

Annabel's was one of the first nightclubs in London to replace their live band with a discothèque. The club was seen as the embodiment of the emerging spirit of Swinging London of the 1960s with its dance floor and DJ, standing in contrast to older clubs like The 400 Club where a small dance orchestra would play medleys from Cole Porter and other composers of the Great American Songbook. Lady Annabel described the early days of Annabel's as a " ... sophisticated place that reflected the youthful spirit of the new decade and the more upmarket end of flower power". In the early 1960s Queen magazine would publish a 'Top 20' of the most requested songs played at Annabel's. Birley would go to New York City to get the latest records from Sam Goody. Many notable entertainers subsequently performed live at Annabel's including Ray Charles, Bryan Ferry, Ella Fitzgerald, Lady Gaga, Diana Ross, The Supremes, and Tina Turner. Annabel's DJ for more than 20 years was Cass the Gas.

Other notable entertainments at the club included fashion shows from the Italian designer Valentino, a Brazilian Carnival with topless dancers and samba musicians and a fortnight of Dixieland jazz with food from the New Orleans restaurant Antoine's and music from the Preservation Hall Jazz Band.

=== Notable staff ===
Birley was known for his loyalty to staff and many of the employees of Annabel's worked for him for decades. The Maître d' of Annabel's for many years was Louis Emanuelli, who had been hired from the restaurant Mirabelle. The singer Shirley Bassey was banned for several years from Annabel's after assaulting Emanuelli. Peter Stringfellow was refused entry to Annabel's after attempting to bribe Emanuelli with £100. Frank Sinatra changed in the cloakroom at Annabel's after performing at the Royal Albert Hall and asked Emanuelli what he thought of him, to which he replied that he thought he was the "greatest Italian since Mussolini".

The attendant in the women's lavatory, Mabel James, has been described as a "psychotherapist and a shoulder to cry on for legions of women". She had been recruited by Birley from Wilton's restaurant on Jermyn Street. Mabel was particularly keen that all women would wash their hands after visiting the toilet, and would stand next to the basin with a towel and fill it with warm water. She would then update Lady Annabel with her weekly list of women who had and hadn't washed their hands.

== Minimum wage law breach ==
Annabel's was the subject of a notable legal case, Annabel's (Berkeley Square) Ltd v Revenue and Customs Comrs, which ruled that the business had not paid its staff the minimum wage and had attempted to use tips to hide this.

== Membership ==
The club was founded in 1963 with 500 members, who paid 5 guineas a year for life membership of the club. 69 founder members were alive at the time of the club's 2018 move to 46 Berkeley Square. The original members continue to pay £5 a year to the present day. In 2005, Annabel's had 9,000 members with membership fees of £750 a year (equivalent to £1,326 in 2025). Guests were banned from buying drinks at the club. Annabel's had 7,000 members in 2009.

Since its relocation in 2018, membership of Annabel's has been equally allocated to men and women. In 2018 the club had 1,000 members and a further waiting list of 14,000 prospective members. Separate tiers of membership fees exist for people aged under 27, under 35, and over 35. The identities of the membership committee of Annabel's have always remained secret. Lifetime memberships of Annabel's at 46 Berkeley Square were available to 100 people, known as Legacy members. The membership is inheritable by their children. A quarter of Legacy members are from the United States. The first 100 members of the new Annabel's were personally chosen by Richard Caring and received a special key.

In 2022, prospective members were invited to apply online with a letter of recommendation from a member. The annual subscription is £3,250 with a joining fee of £1,750.

== Dress code ==
The male dress code at Annabel's under Birley was for a dark suit and tie. Earlier nightclubs had insisted on black tie. The only person granted an exception to the rule by Birley was Mick Jagger. The Beatles were once forbidden entry to Annabel's as they were not wearing shoes and George Harrison was refused entry in 1966 after he arrived "...heavily bearded, wearing a polo-necked sweater and a thick scarf" with Patti Boyd and Eric Clapton. Prince Andrew, Duke of York was also once barred from entry to Annabel's after wearing jeans with an open necked shirt. Birley relaxed the dress code in 2002, no longer requiring male guests to wear a suit and tie. The rule was quickly reimposed however as Birley described in an article for The Spectator that he had " ... overlooked the simple truth that the British have no tradition of casual clothes. We seem to have a uniform for everything: weddings, births, funerals, racing, shooting, hunting, fishing, dancing, dining in the City, attending concerts ... Consequently on those occasions when we are invited to use our initiative, it is invariably a disaster". Birley described how "sights of almost Gothic horror appeared nightly" and that the change was detested by staff and members alike.

The present dress code at Annabel's was devised by Derek Blasberg in 2017, and has been perceived as tongue-in-cheek. Blasberg's rules prohibit "cheap, ill-fitting suits. Denim that is holey or deemed distressed. Shoes that women can't walk in. Hats at night. Sunglasses at night, even if they're prescription. Nipples on women. Nipples on men, especially. Dirty fingernails. Cargo pockets. Spikey hair. Men in shorts. Women in shorts. Exposed bra straps. Visible panty lines. 'Sports bras'". Blasberg is particularly exercised about couples who wear matching clothes as it is "annoying and gimmicky" but intends his list to "encourage individuality and fabulous party dressing, and step back from being binding or overly prescriptive". Jeans and trainers are prohibited after 7pm and jackets must be worn by men everywhere except the dance floor.

== 2007 sale to Richard Caring ==
Mark Birley sold Annabel's and his other private members' clubs Mark's Club, Harry's Bar, the Bath & Racquets Club and George to the entrepreneur Richard Caring for £95 million shortly before his death in 2007 after a year of negotiations. Caring's company Caprice Holdings owned the London restaurants The Ivy, Le Caprice and J. Sheekey at the time of his purchase of Birley's clubs. Upon his death in 2007 Mark Birley left the majority of his estate valued at £120 million and his possessions to India Jane to be kept in trust for her son, Eben, in his will. Birley wrote a letter to India Jane explaining his reasoning behind his will. The letter said that he had sold his clubs to protect them from his son, Robin. A previous will had divided his estate equally between India Jane and Robin, with India Jane additionally receiving her father's house and possessions. The will was challenged by Robin Birley; he initially received two bequests free of tax for £1 million and £5 million. This was subsequently increased to £35 million following an out-of-court settlement.

Caring initially planned to reopen Annabel's in the basement of the building next door to No. 44 and convert the rest of the house into an all day members club. Many long established members of Annabel's subsequently joined the Mayfair members' club 5 Hertford Street, established by Robin Birley in 2012.

Annabel's was the subject of the 2014 documentary film A String of Naked Lightbulbs, directed by Greg Fay and produced by Ridley Scott. An auction of the contents of Annabel's at Christie's in November 2018 realised more than £4 million.

== 2018 to present: 46 Berkeley Square ==
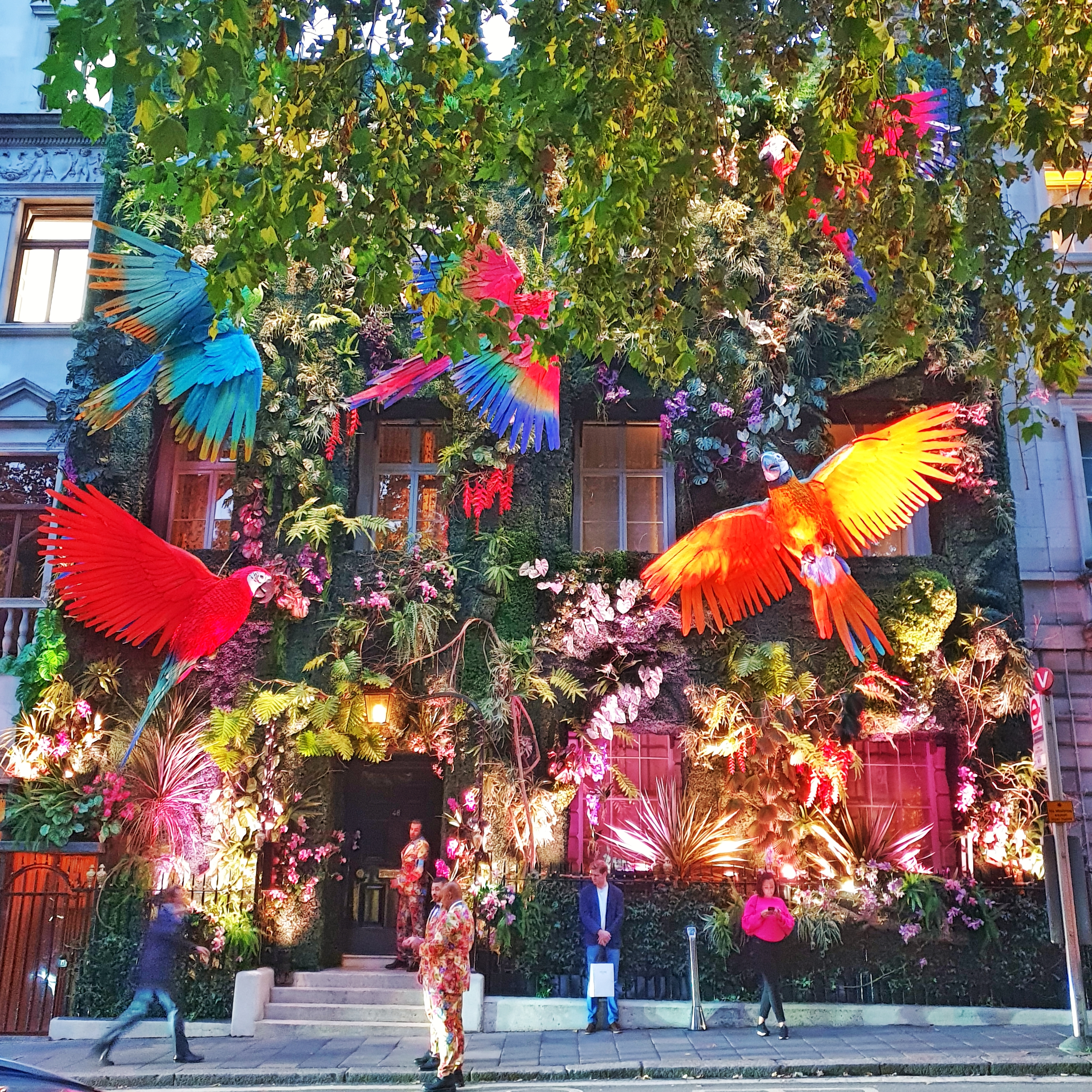
Annabel's at 46 Berkeley Square in 2021

Annabel's closed at No. 44 in February 2018 and reopened in late 2018 at 46 Berkeley Square, two doors down from No. 44. The new Annabel's is set in over 26,000 square feet, occupying the entirety of the 18th-century townhouse of No. 46. The creation of the new Annabel's cost £55 million. It has four restaurants and seven bars for members. Other amenities include a cigar salon and two private dining rooms. The basement nightclub has been recreated with several rooms. Annabel's is open from 7 am for breakfast and closes some 21 hours later. The club is dog-friendly and offers the use of a dog walker to its guests.

== Design and decor ==
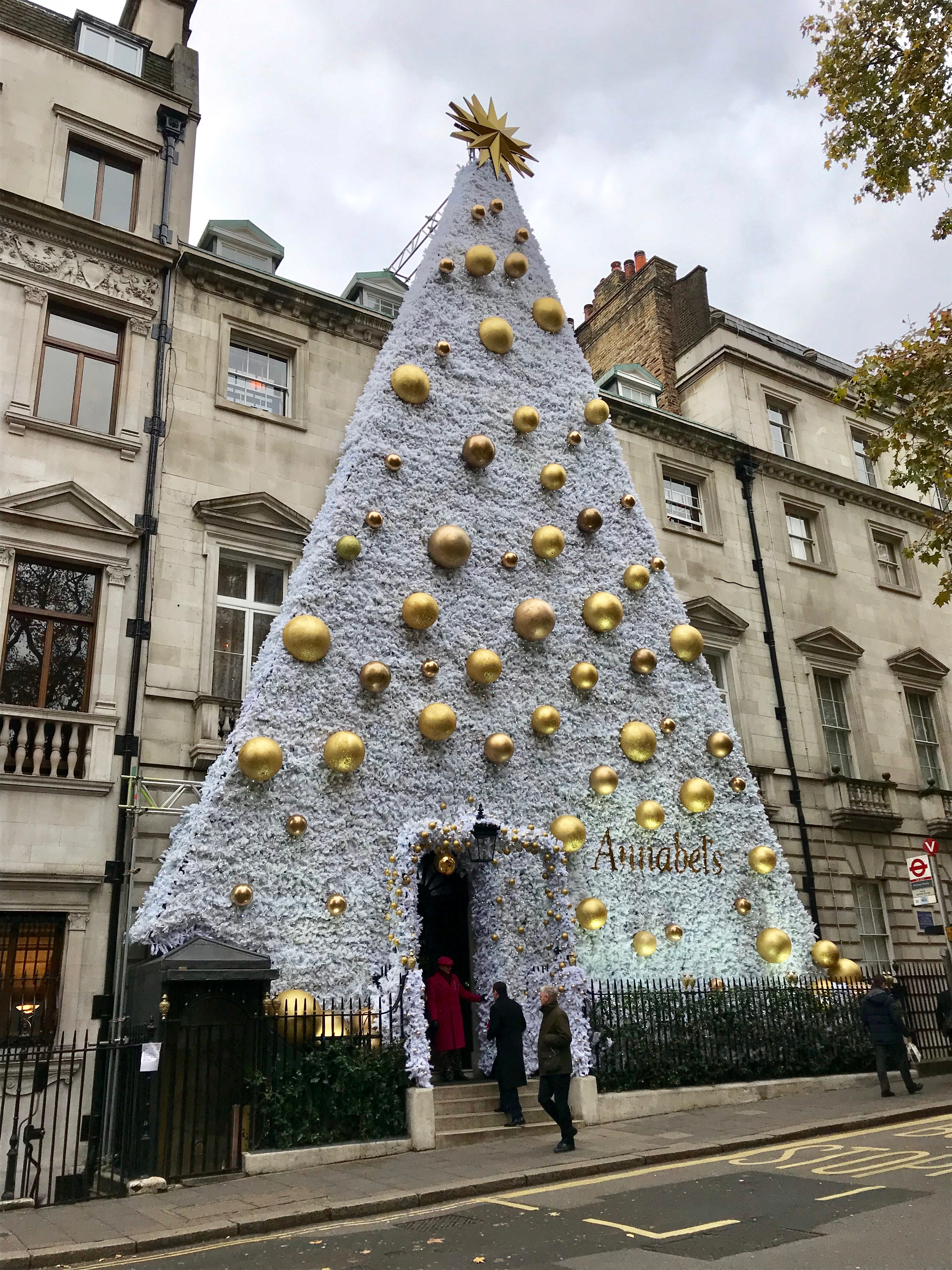
Annabel's Christmas tree, 2019

The interiors of Annabel's at No. 46 were created by Martin Brudnizki's design studio. He had previously created interiors for Caring's Sexy Fish and 34 Mayfair restaurants and updated the interior of The Ivy. Brudnizki was inspired by Caring's "quintessentially British" love of dogs and gardens and modelled the interior design around "animals and gardens, flora and fauna". The interior design of Annabel's is noted for its maximalism. In an article for Vogue about Annabel's reopening Plum Sykes wrote that "For a tiny elite, this is the London aesthetic of now—out-and-out gilt-trimmed maximalism" and that "a Birley inspired joie de vivre has exploded into the decor". Brudnizki said that he wanted to create "a home within a town house that was fresh for the greatest party of the season". In his book More More More, Lawrence Llewellyn Bowen wrote that people were "gobsmacked" at the new Annabel's: "What was once a Sloane safe space with politically dodgy, days-of-the Raj print chintz was now decked out like a tart's boudoir.… It was as if a museum of bad taste and interior design cliches had been gloriously and unrepentantly gussied up into a blancmange of high-kicking snogtastic naughtiness"; nevertheless he concluded that "it was, and remains, an enormous success".

The entrance hall is notably more minimalist in its design in comparison with the other rooms of the club. Brudnizki has likened the aesthetic effect of it to a palate cleanser. It is dominated by a grand staircase, two candelabras, and richly decorated plasterwork of fruit and flowers. The candelabras were made by Baccarat in 1915 for the Russian emperor Nicholas II and were formerly owned by Warner Bros. film studio. They appeared in the films A Star Is Born (1954) and Paris When It Sizzles (1964). In the entrance hall of the club hangs the 1937 painting Girl with a Red Beret and Pompom by Pablo Picasso of his lover Marie-Thérèse Walter. The painting was renamed 'Annabel' by the club's staff. A unicorn suspended from a hot air balloon hangs in the centre of the staircase.

=== Nightclub ===
The nightclub of Annabel's is located in the basement of No. 46. The nightclub comprises the Jungle Bar and the Legacy Bar, a main Nightclub space and male and female bathrooms. The nightclub has de Gournay wallpaper and is lit by palm trees made from glass and brass. The wallpaper depicts elephants and maharajas in one room and jungle scenes in another.

The Legacy Bar is for members that have lifetime membership of Annabel's. It has a floor of green agate with walls of antique mirrors. It is decorated with paintings by Marc Chagall, Amedeo Modigliani, and Pablo Picasso.

=== The Garden Room ===
The Garden Room at Annabel's is a restaurant with a gilded ceiling with roses painted by Gary Myatt with walls of mirrored panels. Myatt's designs were inspired by the gardens at Levens Hall in Lancashire. The tulip chandeliers are made by the Sogni di Cristallo in Murano, Venice. An outside terrace courtyard garden with fig and orange trees that seats 120 is accessed from the Garden Room. It has a retractable roof manufactured by Waagner-Biro.

=== Bathrooms: The Powder Room and The Loos on the Mews ===
The Powder Room, one of the women's bathrooms at Annabel's, is situated on the top floor. It has a ceiling of silk pink roses. It features oyster shell shaped washbasins carved from marble with gold taps shaped like swans. One member reportedly asked if they could host a dinner in the room causing Plum Sykes to write that "There's nothing more glamorous than supper in the loo ... if the loo looks like this one". With over 575,000 likes, The Powder Room was the second most popular toilet on Instagram in 2019, behind only the futuristic eggs of Mayfair restaurant Sketch. Annabel Sampson wrote in Tatler that if the Powder Room was a cake " ... it would be a splendid, seven-tiered red velvet gateau with rippled icing like classical drapery".

The other prominent bathroom, the Loos on the Mews were opened in 2019 and are decorated in a jungle and rainforest theme with four million pieces of mosaic of trees and exotic birds. The men's bathroom features a crocodile shaped washbasin made from a piece of green onyx weighing 500 kg. Brudnizki said of the Loos on the Mews that the "jungle and animal motifs add to the playful spirit of the place ... offering members a similar sense of escapism to the rest of the Club".
