= Victory Park =

Victory Park may refer to:

== Parks ==
- Victory Park, Yerevan, Armenia
- Victory Park (Baku), Azerbaijan
- Victory Park (Chorley), England
- Victory Park (Riga), Latvia
- Victory Park, on Poklonnaya Hill in Moscow, Russia
- Victory Park (Tolyatti), Russia
- Victory Park, Dushanbe, Tajikistan
- Victory Park, Dallas, Texas, U.S.
- Victory Park, Pasadena, California, U.S.
- Victory Park, home of the Haggin Museum in Stockton, California, U.S.
- Victory Park (New Rochelle), New York, U.S.

== Metro stations ==
- Park Pobedy (Moscow Metro) (Victory Park)
- Park Pobedy (Saint Petersburg Metro) (Victory Park)

== See also ==
- Moskovsky Victory Park, Saint Petersburg, Russia
- Maritime Victory Park, Saint Petersburg, Russia
- One Victory Park, a skyscraper in Dallas, Texas
- Park Pobedy (disambiguation)
- SS Park Victory, a 1945 cargo ship
