= 520 Fifth Avenue =

Building in Manhattan, New York

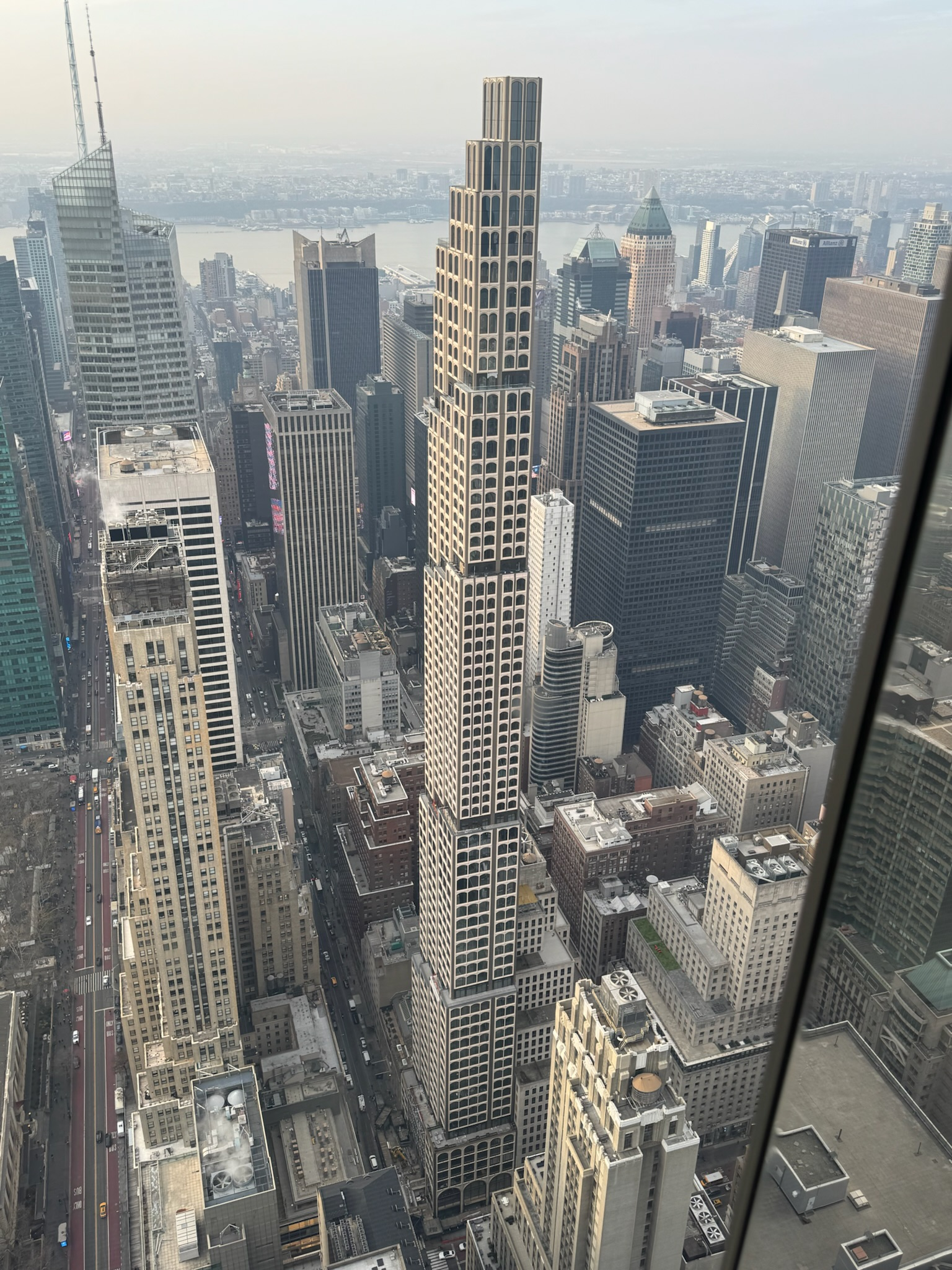
- Interactive map of the 520 Fifth Avenue area

General information
- Status: Completed
- Classification: Mixed-use
- Coordinates: 40°45′16″N 73°58′50″W
- Construction started: March 1, 2022; 4 years ago
- Estimated completion: June 1, 2026; 3 months ago

Height
- Height: 1,001 feet (305 m)

Technical details
- Floor count: 76

Design and construction
- Architect: Kohn Pedersen Fox
- Developer: Mickey Rabina

520 Fifth Avenue is a mixed-use supertall building under construction at Fifth Avenue and 43rd Street in the Midtown Manhattan neighborhood of New York City. The building occupies the former site of three structures. Mickey Rabina is developing the building, and architectural firm Kohn Pedersen Fox designed the structure and serves as architect of record. The interior design is by Charles & Co.

The site of the skyscraper was formerly occupied by three buildings: 516 and 518 Fifth Avenue, and an office building at the 520 Fifth Avenue address. Aby Rosen of RFR Realty, who owned 516 and 518 Fifth Avenue, unsuccessfully attempted to redevelop that site before the Great Recession of the 2000s. RFR and Tahl-Propp Equities tried to redevelop the site again in the late 2000s, and Thor Equities tried to build a 71-story building there before selling the site to joint venture between Ceruzzi Properties and SMI USA in 2015. Rabina bought the sites in 2019 and filed plans for a skyscraper there in 2021. As of 2025, construction is expected to be finished on June 1, 2026.

== History ==
In the 19th century, the site of 520 Fifth Avenue was occupied by the Colored Orphans Asylum, which burned down in the 1863 New York City draft riots. The site was then occupied by three buildings: 516 and 518 Fifth Avenue, and an office building at the 520 Fifth Avenue address. 516 Fifth Avenue sold antiques, shoes, and goods, while 518 Fifth Avenue was an office for the Spanish airline Iberia. The original 520 Fifth Avenue had an art gallery in the late 20th century, which was replaced by a gift shop.

=== Attempted redevelopment efforts ===
Before the Great Recession of the 2000s, Aby Rosen owned 516 and 518 Fifth Avenue. Through his firm, RFR, Rosen at one time intended to partner with Hines to develop 516 Fifth Avenue into a mixed-use skyscraper designed by Pelli Clarke Pelli, though these plans were never realized. Later, RFR entered into a joint venture with Tahl-Propp Equities, owner of 520 Fifth Avenue, planning to either redevelop the site occupied by the three structures, or to sell the three buildings to another developer or investor. RFR and Tahl-Propp entered into the deal to redevelop or sell the composite site in 2007.

After a legal dispute between RFR and Tahl-Propp, RFR purchased 516 and 518 Fifth Avenue, paying approximately $10 million for each building. RFR did not redevelop the site, and Thor Equities began the process of purchasing the buildings from Rosen's firm in 2011, ultimately finalizing its purchase in 2012. An image of a six-story retail component for the site was released in February 2014. In December 2014, Thor filed to build a 71-story, 920-foot skyscraper on a three-story retail podium. Handel Architects was the architect of record for this design.

Thor did not proceed with the building, and ultimately sold the site to a joint venture between Ceruzzi Properties and SMI USA for $325 million in 2015. The firms received financing in the form of loans from JPMorgan Chase and Fisher Brothers. New York YIMBY reported that the two firms would proceed with plans for a building designed by Handel Architects, originally produced for Thor. In an interview in 2015, Louis Ceruzzi, founder of Ceruzzi Properties, stated the firm intended to begin construction on the site in early 2016. Lou Ceruzzi had wanted to develop a structure with three stories of retail, 145 residential condominiums, and an eight-story hotel with 208 rooms. In 2017, Ceruzzi and SMI received a bridge loan from Mack Real Estate Credit Strategies, which took the place of the earlier financing. Lou Ceruzzi died that year, and The Real Deal reported that the two firms were looking for a third development partner in 2018. New York City developers including Extell and Zeckendorf were among the potential partners considered. In 2018, Ceruzzi and SMI defaulted on the Mack loan. Mack placed the loan for sale through HFF.

=== Rabina development ===
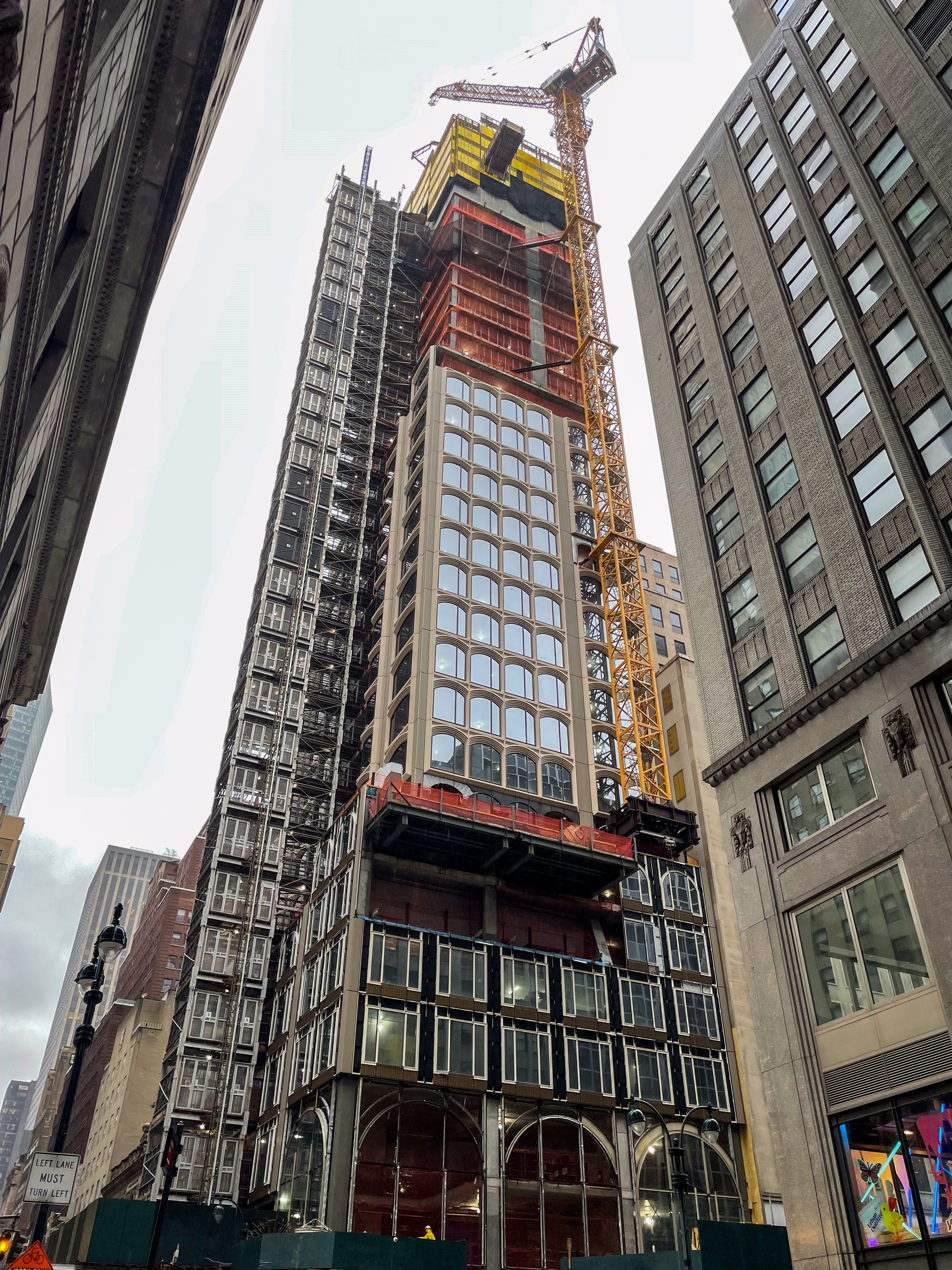
Under construction in 2024

The developer Mickey Rabina purchased the site in 2019 for $205 million. Rabina repaid Mack during the process of buying the site, and he secured a new mortgage for $110 million from Bank OZK. Bank OZK made the construction loan to the project's developer despite a drop in foot traffic on Fifth Avenue (attributed to the COVID-19 pandemic) due to project's residential component and the enduring strength of the Manhattan residential market. At the time, the developers tentatively planned to construct a 76-story skyscraper rising 920 feet (280 m). Kohn Pedersen Fox (KPF) received the commission after KPF's president James von Klemperer heard rumors about Rabina's plans and cold called him. KPF's plans were filed in early 2021, replacing the earlier Thor (and subsequently Ceruzzi and SMI) plan designed by Handel Architects. The plans called for a skyscraper rising 896 feet (273 m), with about 100 residences. In addition, the facade was to be made of terracotta rather than glass.

New York YIMBY reported that Kohn Pedersen Fox had redesigned the plans for the skyscraper in December 2021. Rabina received a combined $540 million in construction financing from Bank OZK and The Carlyle Group in March 2022. Excavation began at some point between the redesign and the financing and was still underway in July 2022. Work on the building's foundation began later in 2022. The project was constrained by the small site and the fact that the neighboring streets could not be closed to traffic. As a result, several cranes had to be used to construct the superstructure, and a series of hoists were installed to accelerate deliveries of materials. Construction was above street level as of March 2023. New York YIMBY reported that the installation of the building's facade was underway in October 2023.

Sales at the building began in April 2024, with the cheapest apartments selling for $1.7 million. Three-fifths of the apartments had been sold by that October, when the building was topped out. Steelwork was completed at the end of that December. At the time, the first residents were scheduled to move into 520 Fifth Avenue in 2025, while the building was expected to be completed the following year. By the time the highest penthouse apartment was sold in February 2025, eighty-five percent of the units had been sold. The first office tenants leased space that July. Among the building's early commercial tenants was the conglomerate JAB Holding Company and Texas Capital. Rabina refinanced the building in December 2025 with a $640 million loan from the Carlyle Group. As of 2025, construction was expected to be finished on June 1, 2026. The penthouse was sold in May 2026 for $12 million.

== Architecture ==
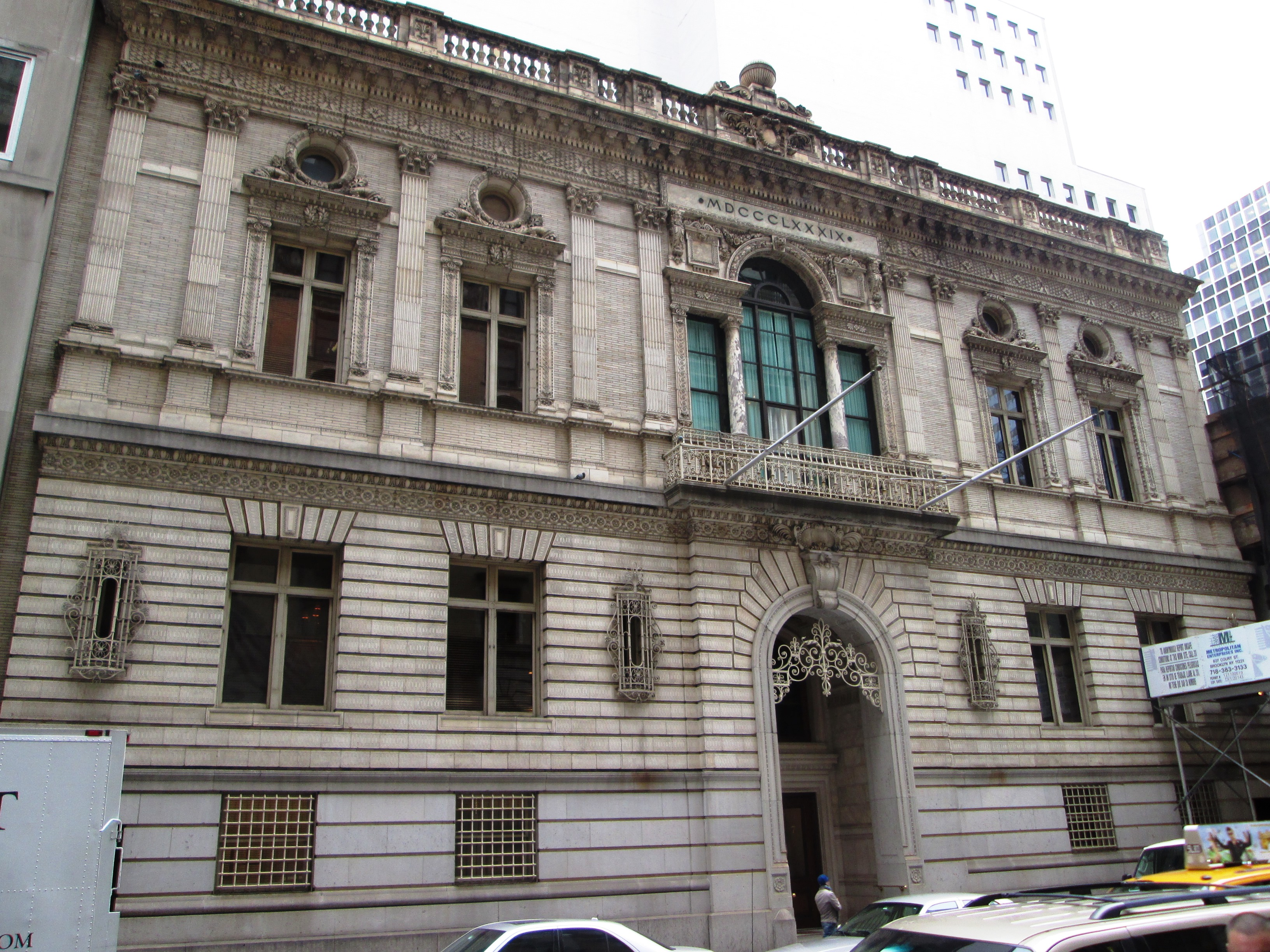
The exterior of the Century Association Building

The building was designed by Kohn Pedersen Fox on a site measuring about 10,625 square feet (987.1 m^{2}). Von Klemperer said the firm drew inspiration from the works of Hugh Ferriss and from buildings near the site when designing the building. In particular, von Klemperer cited the Fred F. French Building, Century Association Building, the New York Public Library Main Branch, and Grand Central Terminal as inspiring the building's design. The lower portion of the building, from floors 9 to 34, will be used as office space, spanning 25 stories. The upper levels, between floors 42 and 80, are used as residences and span 37 stories. The developers acquired air rights from the General Society of Mechanics and Tradesmen of the City of New York, Century Association, and Princeton Club buildings, allowing them to build about 200,000 square feet (19,000 m^{2}) more than the maximum typically allowed for the site.

=== Exterior ===
The top of the building is approximately 1,000 feet (300 m) tall, making it a pencil tower with a height–width radio of 15:1. There are several setbacks, which are placed asymmetrically on the exterior massing; these setbacks create outdoor terraces, which are arranged in a spiraling pattern. The facade contains arched windows, each measuring 10 feet (3.0 m) wide and 10 feet high, which are interspersed with fluted piers. The lowest floors, beneath the first setback, have both rectangular and arched windows. The lower stories are clad in terracotta panels, while the upper stories are clad in painted aluminum. There is a portico measuring 32 feet (9.8 m) tall, which shelters an entrance to the building's three lobbies. On upper stories, the dimensions of the building's arches vary.

Approximately 5,500 curtain wall panels are used on the facade. Each of the office stories has outdoor terraces and operable windows. The movable windows on 520 Fifth Avenue's office stories are unusual for a modern office building in New York City; according to Ian Michael Klein of Rabina, the windows were intended to give the feeling that "you’re not trapped in a glass box". By contrast, most of the city's office buildings completed after the 1961 Zoning Resolution tended not to have operable windows, since it would decrease the efficiency of their central heating, ventilation, and air conditioning (HVAC) systems. The upper-story condominiums are legally required to have operable windows, which are spaced farther apart. The windows on the upper stories are progressively larger, while the ground story has a colonnade.

=== Interior ===
The foundation extends 48 feet (15 m) below ground and consists of pads measuring 10 to 19 feet (3.0 to 5.8 m) thick; the foundation walls are 60 feet (18 m) thick on average. The elevator pits descend 60 feet (18 m) below ground level. The superstructure is supported by concrete pillars. Each of the 72 stories is a reinforced concrete floor slab, with steel beams and concrete shear walls linking it to the concrete core; the structure is further reinforced by "belt floors" on floors 32 and 52. The southeast corner of the building, facing Fifth Avenue and 43rd Street, has a 24-by-24-inch (610 by 610 mm) steel column that rises 31 stories and is connected to the core.

Vicky Charles of Charles & Co. designed 520 Fifth Avenue's interior. The building's main entrance is through a lobby area with walls of walnut wood and a floor of mosaic tiles. There are three lobbies: a residential lobby to the west, an office lobby at the center, and a lobby for members of the building's club to the east. The building is mixed-use, with 100 residences and office space, in addition to restaurants on the first three stories. The office space spans approximately 200,000 square feet (19,000 m^{2}), with ceilings measuring 12 feet (3.7 m) high. Each of the office stories has a separate HVAC system. The building has little retail space because, at the time of its development, retail space on Fifth Avenue between 40th and 49th streets was less profitable than retail space between 50th and 59th streets.

The upper stories include 100 apartments with between one and four bedrooms each. The interiors are painted in neutral colors and have crystal, brass, and wood decorations. In the apartments are kitchens with walnut cabinets, bathrooms with marble floors, and ceilings measuring 10 to 14 feet (3.0 to 4.3 m) high. The five highest residences are penthouse apartments, which each occupy a full story. According to Vicky Charles, the residences used "rich colors, hand-printed wallcoverings, soft warm plasters, custom crystal chandeliers, buttery leathers, and luxurious plush upholstery".

The building includes a private club called Moss, to which tenants receive free membership. The club contains the Babette restaurant, Turkish baths, lounges, and a pickleball court. On the top floor, which is numbered as the 88th because of its 880-foot (270 m) height above ground level, is a game room, library, sun room, and dining room. The sun room measures 16 by 25 feet (4.9 by 7.6 m) across with three glass walls. The top five stories contain a tuned mass damper weighing 500 short tons (450 long tons; 450 t) along with mechanical equipment.

== See also ==
- List of tallest buildings in New York City
