= 46 Berkeley Square =

House in Mayfair, London, England

Coordinates: 51°30′33″N 0°08′47″W

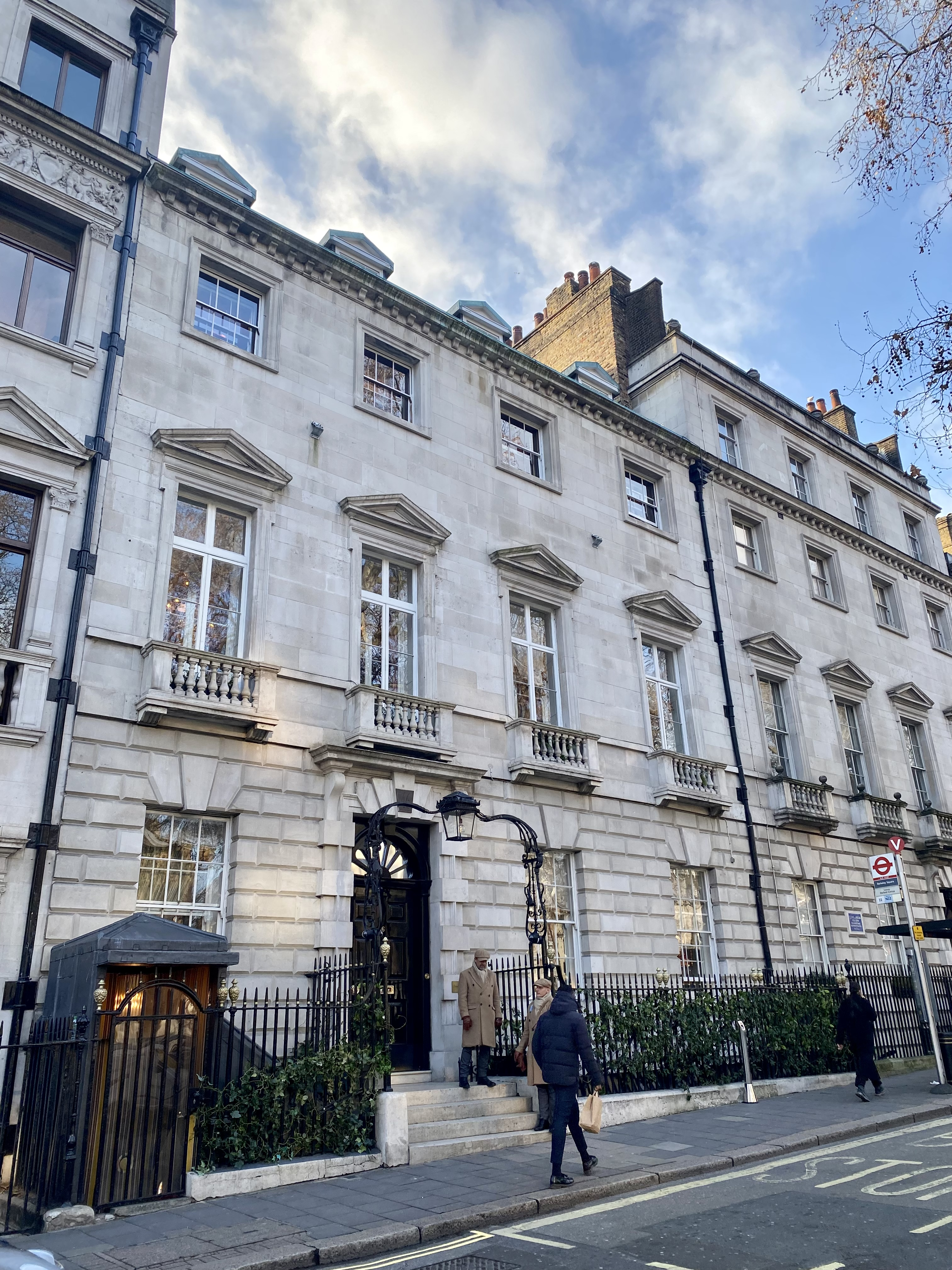
46 Berkeley Square in January 2022

46 Berkeley Square is a house on Berkeley Square in the Mayfair district of London, England. It was used as offices, including the London headquarters of the Chase Manhattan Bank, for several decades and has been the site of the private member's club Annabel's since 2018.

It was built in 1744–50 as part of a pair of town houses with No. 45; the two houses are jointly listed Grade I on the National Heritage List for England. The architect is believed to have been Henry Flitcroft. 46 Berkeley Square was the town residence of the Earl of Darnley, with their country residence Cobbham Hall near Gravesend in Kent. It was subsequently the London residence of the Mildmay family.

The house was used as offices from 1948. It became the London headquarters for the Chase Manhattan Bank. No. 46 was put up for auction in October 1967 along with its mews house, 46 Hays Mews. The house was sold in June 1968, with a value £330,000 (equivalent to £5,046,872 in 2025) being quoted for the remaining 70 years of the lease. It was known as Ralli House in the 1970s and hosted lunches celebrating the Bowater-Ralli Fellowship in Surgery.

The freehold to 45 and 46 Berkeley Square is owned by the Berkeley Square Holdings Group. The group is owned by the President of the United Arab Emirates and is registered in the tax haven of the British Virgin Islands.

46 Berkeley Square has been occupied by the private member's club Annabel's since 2018. Annabel's relocated to No. 46 from No. 44 Berkeley Square, where it had been founded by Mark Birley in 1963. In 2007 Birley sold Annabel's and his four other clubs to the businessman Richard Caring. Caring spent £55 million refurbishing No. 46, and Annabel's reopened there in 2018. The club occupies 26,000 sq ft of No. 46 with various restaurants, bars, private dining rooms and a nightclub. A spa is located in the mews house. The interiors were redesigned and decorated by Martin Brudnizki Design Studio.
