= Monte Robbins =

American football player (born 1964)

No. 43
- Position: Punter

Personal information
- Born: September 19, 1964 (age 62); Great Bend, Kansas, U.S.
- Listed height: 6 ft 4 in (1.93 m)
- Listed weight: 202 lb (92 kg)

Career information
- High school: Great Bend (KS)
- College: Michigan
- NFL draft: 1988: 4th round, 107th overall pick

Career history
- Tampa Bay Buccaneers (1988)*; Chicago Bears (1988)*; Washington Redskins (1989)*; New England Patriots (1989)*; Montreal Machine (1992)
- * Offseason or practice squad member only

Awards and highlights
- Holds Michigan record for longest punt (82 yards); Holds Michigan career record with 42.6 yard average on 187 punts

Dammond R. "Monte" Robbins (born September 19, 1964) is an American former professional football punter. He played for the University of Michigan from 1984 to 1987. He holds Michigan's all-time records for the longest punt (82 yards) and for average yards per punt in a career (42.6) and in a year (45.0).

== University of Michigan ==
A native of Great Bend, Kansas, Robbins played for the University of Michigan from 1984 to 1987 under Michigan head coach Bo Schembechler. In his four years at Michigan, he punted 187 times for 8,053 yards, averaged 42.6 yards per punt, and had only one punt blocked. In December 1986, he set a Michigan school record with an 82-yard punt against Hawaii. Robbins later recalled his record-setting kick: "I guess my highlight was in the Hawaii game in 1986 when we were backed up on our goal-line. I kicked one 82 yards that turned the game around. After we got better field position, we scored a TD on our next possession that won the game." Because of Robbins' hang time, Michigan led the country in 1986 with a 43.0-yard average in net punting, punts minus returns. As a senior in 1987, he averaged 45.0 yards on 36 punts. In April 1988, Robbins summed up his playing career at Michigan: "It was a great experience and I saw a lot of things. Michigan is a great place to be. You get great exposure here. No other team in the country has 105,000 fans for its home games. I was able to play under a coach like Bo Schembechler. I've dealt with a lot of pressure situations."

Robbins played during the same years that the Big Ten Conference also featured future NFL punters Tom Tupa and Greg Montgomery and, accordingly, was never named to an All-Big Ten team despite setting Michigan's all-time punting records. Robbins was later selected by Athlon Sports as the punter on the All-Time Michigan Team.

== Michigan punting records ==
Robbins holds and/or held the following Michigan punting records:

- He holds Michigan's current career record for yards per punt with an average of 42.8 yards per punt.
- He holds Michigan's current single season record for yards per punt with an average of 45.0 yards per punt in 1987.
- He holds Michigan's current record for longest punt at 82 yards.
- He held Michigan's career record for net punting yards with 8,053 yards. His career yardage record was broken in 2009 by Zoltan Mesko, who closed out his Michigan career with 10,703 yards.
- He held Michigan's single season record for net punting yards with 2,705 in 1984. His record was broken in 2001 by Hayden Epstein. Mesko holds the current single season record.

== Professional football ==
He was selected by the Tampa Bay Buccaneers in the fourth round (107th overall pick) of the 1988 NFL draft. He was the highest drafted punter in Buccaneers history. After averaging 36.6 yards on seven punts in the 1988 exhibition season, Robbins was cut by the Buccaneers on August 22, 1988. He was picked up by the Chicago Bears on August 23, 1988, but he did not play in any regular season games for the Bears. Robbins signed as a free agent with the Washington Redskins in early 1989 and was traded to the New England Patriots in April 1989. In August 1989, he was waived by the Patriots to make room on the roster for Russ Francis. In April 1992, he was waived by the Montreal Machine of the World League of American Football.

== Later life ==
After retiring from football, Robbins went into the mortgage banking business. From 1994 to 2002, he was a regional vice president for Amresco Commercial Lending, Inc. From 2002 to 2010, he was the president and chief executive officer of CapWest Mortgage Corporation in Overland Park, Kansas.
