= HFF (commercial real estate) =

Defunct commercial real estate firm

HFF, Inc.
- Type: Joint-stock company
- Industry: Commercial real estate
- Founded: 1998; 28 years ago
- Defunct: July 1, 2019; 6 years ago
- Fate: Acquired by JLL
- Headquarters: One Victory Park, Dallas, Texas,
- Revenue: ▲$662 million (2018)
- Operating income: ▼$95 million (2018)
- Net income: ▲$116 million (2018)
- Total assets: ▼$858 million (2018)
- Total equity: ▲$351 million (2018)
- Number of employees: 1,074 (2018)

HFF, Inc. was a provider of capital markets and brokerage services to owners of commercial real estate. In 2019, the company was acquired by JLL.

== History ==
In 1974, John Fowler and Peter Goedecke founded Fowler, Goedecke & Company. In 1982, Holliday Fenoglio & Co was founded by Harold E. (Hal) Holliday and John Fenoglio.

In 1994, Amresco acquired Holliday Fenoglio Dockerty & Gibson. In 1998, Amresco acquired Fowler, Goedecke, Ellis & O'Connor Inc. and merged the two companies to form Holliday Fenoglio Fowler L.P. In 1999, the company was sold to Lendlease for $228 million.

In 2007, it became a public company via an initial public offering that raised $257 million. In 2012, founders Holliday and Fenoglio went to work for CBRE. In July 2019, JLL acquired the company for $1.8 billion. Following the acquisition, HFF's common stock stopped trading and was delisted from the New York Stock Exchange.
