= Park Pobedy =

Park Pobedy, literally meaning "Victory Park" in Russian, may refer to:

- Park Pobedy (Moscow Metro), a metro station
- Park Pobedy (Saint Petersburg Metro), a metro station

== See also ==
- Victory Park (disambiguation)
