= The Sun Rose West Hollywood =

Hotel and music venue in West Hollywood

Coordinates: 34.0948°N 118.3735°W

The Sun Rose West Hollywood is a 149-room hotel and live-music venue at 8430 Sunset Boulevard in West Hollywood, California. The property opened in April 2021 as Pendry West Hollywood and was renamed The Sun Rose in August 2025 after its in-house performance room, Live at the Sun Rose.

== Development and opening ==
In 2010, the West Hollywood City Council approved a mixed-use project then known as Sunset Time. The approved plans allowed for a 149-room hotel, 40 condominium units, commercial space and a live-entertainment venue. The site had previously been occupied by the West Hollywood House of Blues.

By 2019, the development was reported as a project costing more than $500 million, comprising the hotel, 40 residences and a dedicated music room. It was developed by AECOM Capital and Combined Properties and designed by Ehrlich Yanai Rhee Chaney Architects. Pendry West Hollywood opened in early April 2021.

== Architecture and design ==
The hotel and the separate stepped residential building were designed by EYRC Architects, with Cuningham serving as architect of record and Martin Brudnizki Design Studio designing the hotel interiors. A central piazza separates the hotel and residential structures. The Sunset Boulevard elevation includes more than 5,300 square feet (490 m^{2}) of LED surfaces, conceived as an architectural interpretation of the Strip's large-format billboards. The lower facade uses herringbone-patterned marble and arch-and-column references to mediate between the digital exterior and the interiors.

Brudnizki used saturated colors, patterned surfaces and references to Hollywood interiors in the hotel's public spaces and guestrooms. Metropolis contrasted those interiors with the building's modern exterior and described the performance room as part of a program intended to bring both hotel guests and local visitors to the property.

== Live at the Sun Rose ==
The hotel's performance room adopted the Sun Rose name in spring 2022. LA Weekly described it in 2023 as a 150-capacity listening room whose programming emphasized residencies and collaborative performances rather than a conventional headliner-and-opening-act format. Jeff Goldblum and the Mildred Snitzer Orchestra participated in an early unannounced residency before the room was formally named. Later programming included pianist Mike Garson's Bowie-focused series, Adam Blackstone's Legacy series, and a three-night T-Pain residency in 2023.

The venue's Bowie programming became a recurring element. In January 2026, Garson led a three-night tribute marking David Bowie's birthday and the tenth anniversary of his death. A Rolling Stone review reported performances by Billy Corgan, Jimmy Chamberlin, Chad Smith, Andra Day, Judith Hill and other guests.

== Rebranding as The Sun Rose ==
Pendry West Hollywood was renamed The Sun Rose West Hollywood on August 1, 2025. The hotel retained its staff, dining operations and programming, and expanded the venue's identity across the property. Blackstone, who had curated programming at the venue, became the hotel's creative director.

In January 2026, the Los Angeles Times profiled the hotel as a music destination and reported that performances were being extended beyond the dedicated venue to the atrium, rooftop and other hotel spaces. The article also identified Garson as an artist in residence and described Blackstone's role in developing hotel-wide programming. A 2025 review in Conde Nast Traveler similarly treated the venue as the organizing element of the rebranded hotel rather than a separate amenity.

== Site history ==
The House of Blues opened on the site in April 1994 with a program that included blues, rock, soul, gospel, country and hip-hop performers. During its two decades of operation, the venue hosted performers across rock, hip-hop and R&B and maintained a recurring Gospel Brunch. It closed in August 2015 and was demolished for the hotel and residential development. The later Sun Rose venue is located on the same site but is not the same building or organization.
