= International Clothing Designs =

British clothing supplier

International Clothing Designs is a UK-based supplier to the fashion retail industry. It was founded by entrepreneur Richard Caring in the 1970s and initially imported mass-produced clothing from manufacturers in Hong Kong into the UK market.

== History ==
Having grown a women's fashion supply business in the UK during the 1960s, Caring visited Hong Kong in 1971. Labour and materials were cheaper than in Britain, and Caring worked with local manufacturers to develop mass production techniques that delivered quality results. As a result, he became one of the first western high fashion buyers to develop localised Chinese relationships, and returned to the UK to sell the new high quality but cheaper garments to UK retailers.

International Clothing Designs (ICD) was established to exploit the new opportunity, and Caring moved his family permanently to Hong Kong in 1979. At its height ICD supplied 70% of the clothing sold by British high street retailers, supplying Marks & Spencer, Mothercare and Next. Through ICD and its trading, Caring met Philip Green, the fashion retailer, and became the dominant supplier to Green's Arcadia Group, which included Dorothy Perkins, Topshop and Top Man.

ICD had majority holdings in 17 companies, but by 2005 only two were active, and turnover at the holding company, once over £100m, had fallen to £85.5m, and to £74.2m a year later - though "a complex web of businesses, many of which lead to offshore holding companies, [make] it hard to detect Caring's full earnings from the fashion world." During the 2000s, ICD reduced its scale, but in 2009 still employed some 250 people.

For 15 years up to about 2005, fellow fashion retail businessman Phil Wrigley (chairman of New Look) regarded Caring's business as "a very significant, if not the most significant, supplier of apparel to the UK". Then, as retailers began to deal directly with suppliers, ICD scaled down from 27 clothing divisions to eight by 2010.
