= The Business Inspector =

- Genre: Documentary
- Starring: Hilary Devey
- Country of origin: United Kingdom
- No. of series: 1
- No. of episodes: 4

Production
- Running time: 60 minutes (inc. adverts)

Original release
- Network: Channel 5
- Release: 17 March – 7 April 2010

Related
- The Hotel Inspector; The Restaurant Inspector

The Business Inspector is an observational documentary television series which aired on British terrestrial television station, Channel 5 in 2010. It is a spin-off from the popular British programme The Hotel Inspector. In each episode, businesswoman, entrepreneur, self-made millionaire Hilary Devey visited and aimed to transform struggling small businesses. Each week, Hilary tackled two ailing companies.

== Episodes ==
No.	Business	Original release date
1a	Florist	17 March 2010
Hilary heads to Milton Keynes, where cousins Donna and Ann run an ailing floristry business. The pair embarked on a floristry course with dreams of making enough money to move the family to Spain. Four years on and the cousins are still working at an out-of-town enterprise park and are yet to make enough money to take a wage. With hardly any orders for their flowers, they spend most of their days slurping tea. Hilary is gobsmacked to learn that Donna and Ann's website does not even work. But there is worse to come when Hilary looks at their accounts and sees the company has lost thousands of pounds – yet Donna and Ann do not seem to understand or care. The business has survived thus far on hand-outs from relatives. Hilary's first task is to order Ann's mum to stop the flow of cash. Determined to find the girls a regular source of income, she then pushes them to win a big floral contract at Bletchley Hall, a posh local wedding venue.
1b	Events Company	17 March 2010
Hilary visits Warwick, where go-getter Gary has been running an events company for the last 19 years. Gary believes that he is on the verge of greatness – he has created a series of elaborate, illuminated table centres that add glamour and style to any big event. He now wants Hilary's help in setting up a franchise to market his products, so the mischievous Business Inspector secretly organises an event to see if Gary's creations can float her boat. Hilary is wowed by Gary's flashing table centres, but when they get down to business, she discovers that his creative juices are more impressive than his business sense. It seems that turning creative types into business dynamites is going to be an uphill battle for Hilary.
2a	Go-karting	24 March 2010
Premier Karting, once a booming business, is now feeling its age. Tired and rundown, it's literally months away from going bust; it needs help and fast. When Hilary meets Derek she's shocked to discover he has sat back and allowed customer numbers to dwindle. He has lost money hand over fist, and is now down to financing the business with his life savings – even his home is on the line. Hilary's first task is to get him and the team back in the driving seat, and bring business in. She mounts a massive campaign to get customers through the door.
2b	Cocktail Bar	24 March 2010
In St Albans, Mokoko's cocktails may be hitting the mark, but the profits are hitting the floor. Hilary grew up in a pub, so she knows all about to make it work. She thinks Jaas is too niche and too nice to make the tough business decisions he needs to make. Behind the glossy exterior, all is far from well, and Mokoko is struggling to make any real profits. As she delves deeper, Hilary discovers that Jaas doesn't control his own stock and, amazingly, isn't pricing the drinks for maximum profit. The Business Inspector wastes no time in telling Jaas to get back behind the bar and in control of his business. What's more, with a new baby on the way, Mokoko has got to finally start paying its way.
3a	Pole-dancing Club/Fitness Instructor	31 March 2010
Things get off to a bad start when Hilary cannot even find Lou's studio. With no advertising, no web page and no telephone number listed, Lou's business is all but invisible. It is small wonder she is failing to get people through the door. When Hilary finally locates Affinity Pole Fitness, she is horrified by the shambolic studio and the uninviting classes on offer. She soon finds herself locked in a battle of wills with feisty Lou. Despite the fact that she is struggling to support her young family after sinking every penny she has into her failing business, Lou still thinks that she knows better than Hilary.
3b	Dog-grooming Service	31 March 2010
Noeline runs Pooch Power dog-grooming service from the garage of her semi in a quiet Bournemouth suburb, and her profits so far stand at just £7,000. Hilary sneakily books in her own pooch to test out the wannabe entrepreneur's talents. While she is pleased by Noeline's grooming skills, she is less than impressed with her business sense.
4a	Haulage	7 April 2010
Family man Harry runs a decades-old haulage business on the outskirts of Dartford. This is a racket with a lot of history – his grandfather started the family trade with a single horse and cart in the 1930s. Today, Harry's business still supports his family, with his two sons and a granddaughter working alongside him. It is Harry's hope that the younger generation will soon take the reins from him so he can retire. However, due to the recession, trucks are standing stationary in the yard and this once thriving haulage firm is losing money. The Business Inspector wastes no time in rolling up her sleeves and getting to the root of the problem.
4b	Spa	7 April 2010
Hilary travels all the way up to Yorkshire to visit Amaana Spa. Owner Saarah's husband invested over £130,000 of his own money in the business three years ago to give Saarah "a focus". Hilary discovers Saarah is a hands-off boss who needs to take control of her underperforming business. However, this timid country girl needs some of ballsy Hilary's confidence to rub off if she is to have any chance of turning her salon around. Only time will tell whether she will receive the boost in revenue she so sorely needs.
