= The Ivy (United Kingdom) =

British restaurant

Coordinates: 51.51285°N 0.12808°W

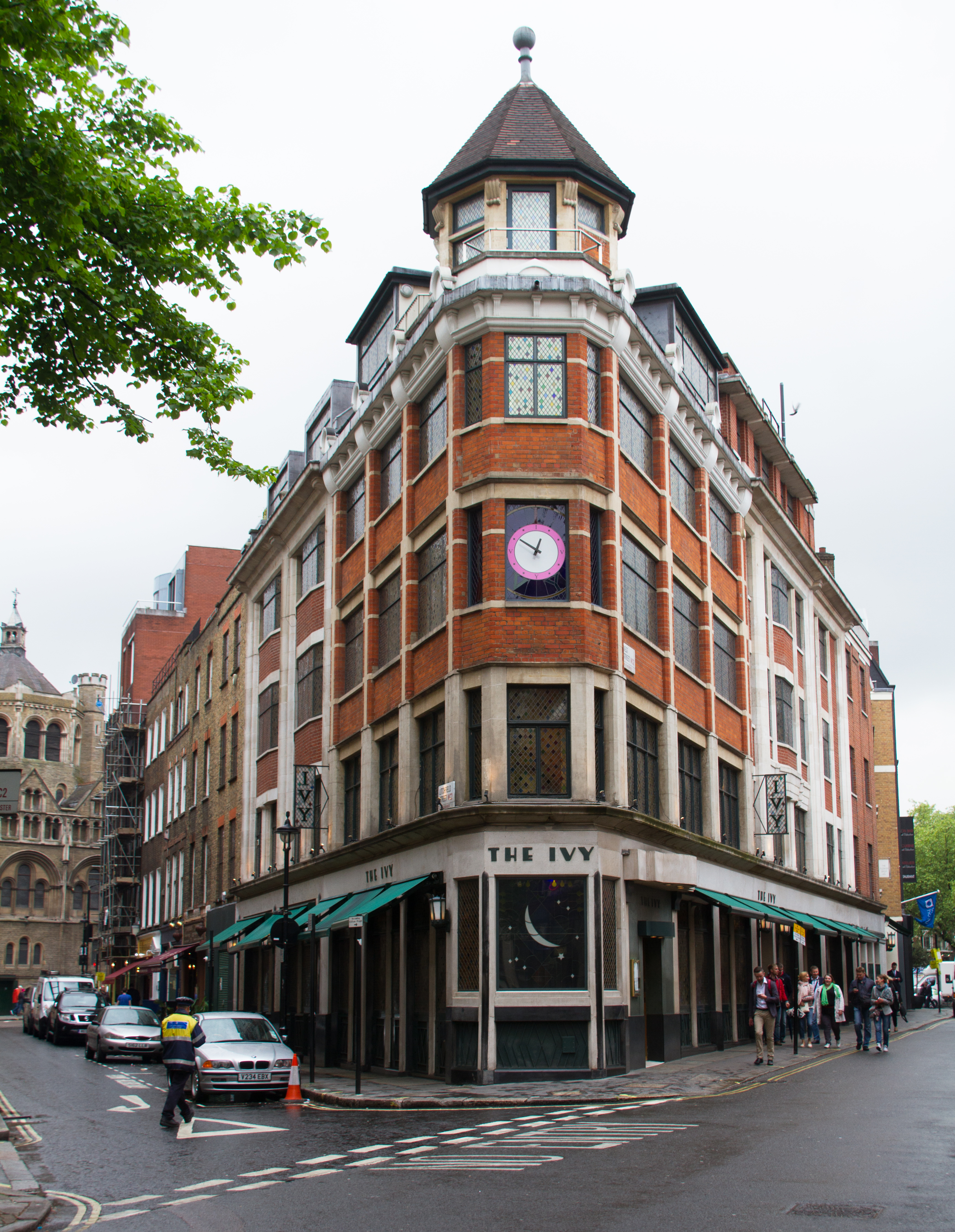
- The Ivy, London
- Interactive map of The Ivy

Restaurant information
- Established: 1917
- Owner: Richard Caring
- Head chef: Gary Lee
- Dress code: Smart casual
- Location: West Street, London, England
- Website: the-ivy.co.uk

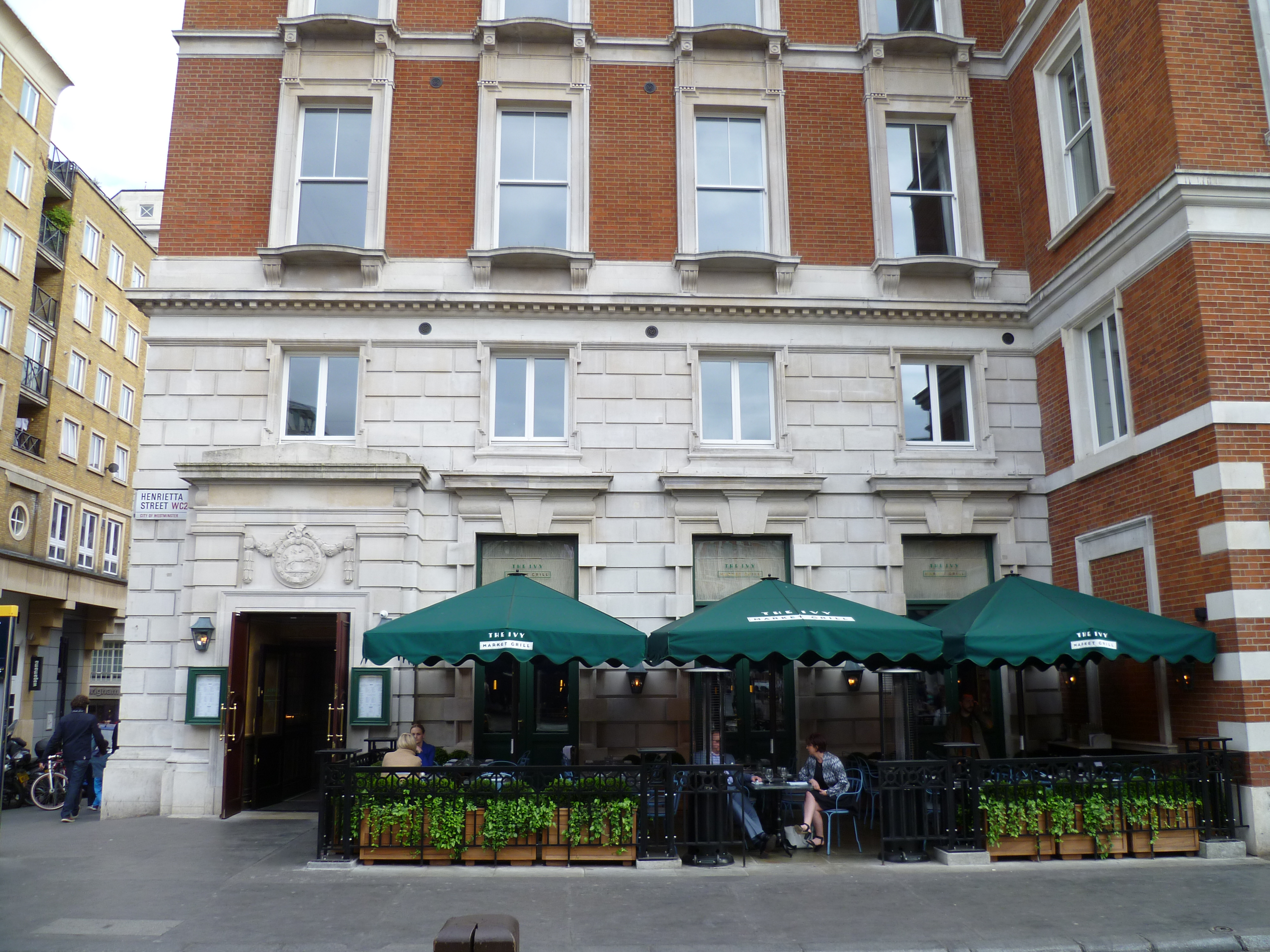
The Ivy Market Grill, Henrietta Street, London

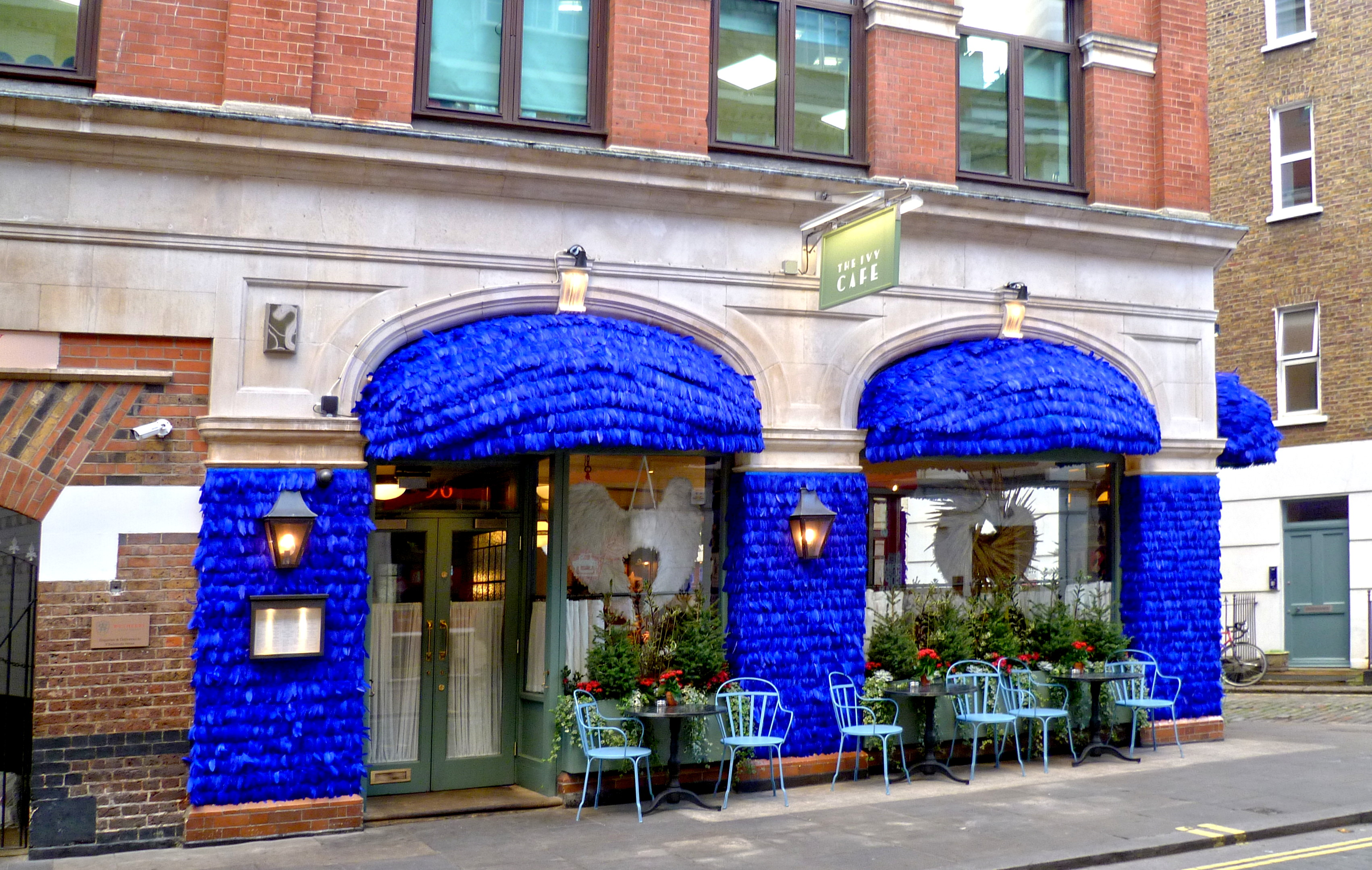
The Ivy Cafe in Marylebone Lane, November 2016

The Ivy is a British restaurant founded in 1917 known for its popularity with celebrities. Its location in the West End, opposite the Ambassadors and St Martin's theatres, made it popular with actors and theatregoers. The Ivy has since expanded into various locations across the United Kingdom and Ireland, known as the Ivy Collection.

== History ==
=== 1917–1989 ===
The restaurant was opened by Abel Giandolini in 1917, as an unlicensed Italian café in West Street in the theatre district of London. Legend has it that the name originated from a chance remark by the actress Alice Delysia, who overheard Giandolini apologise to a customer for the inconvenience caused by building works. When he said that it was because of his intention to create a restaurant of the highest class, she interjected "Don't worry – we will always come and see you. 'We will cling together like the ivy'", a line from the then-popular song, 1902's "Just Like the Ivy I'll Cling to You", written by A. J. Mills and Harry Castling. The restaurant expanded in the same location in 1929, run by Giandolini, with his longstanding maitre d', Mario Gallati, as host.

In part due to its proximity to the West End theatres, exclusivity and late closing time, the restaurant quickly became a theatrical institution, with Laurence Olivier and Vivien Leigh, Marlene Dietrich, John Gielgud, Lilian Braithwaite, Terence Rattigan, Binkie Beaumont and Noël Coward being habitués, having their regular two-seater tables along the walls. According to the actor Donald Sinden in his Sky Arts television documentary series Great West End Theatres, The Ivy became so famous as a theatrical-celebrities haunt that in the 1943 revue Sweet and Low, which ran for almost six years at the neighbouring Ambassadors Theatre, there was a satirical sketch included, updated regularly, entitled Poison Ivy, where the show's star Hermione Gingold "would exchange wicked and salacious celebrity gossip".

In 1950, Giandolini sold The Ivy to Bernard Walsh and the restaurant became part of his Wheeler's group of fish restaurants. Subsequent owners were Lady Grade and the Forte Foundation. After closing in 1989, Jeremy King and Chris Corbin, who owned Le Caprice, bought it.

=== 1990–present ===
Under its new owners, the restaurant was transformed to a design by American architect MJ Long and incorporated specially-commissioned artworks by Sir Eduardo Paolozzi, Sir Peter Blake, Sir Howard Hodgkin, Bridget Riley, Allen Jones, Joe Tilson, Patrick Caulfield, Michael Craig-Martin and Tom Phillips. The restaurant reopened in June 1990.

A recipe book, The Ivy: The Restaurant and its Recipes, written by the restaurant critic A. A. Gill was published in 1997.

Fernando Peire was appointed senior maître d', eventually leaving in December 1998, three months after the restaurant was sold to Belgo PLC as part of Caprice Holdings Ltd; Corbin and King departed two years later (whereupon they established their own Rex Restaurants, later Corbin & King).

In 2000, the restaurant was awarded the Moët & Chandon London Restaurant Award for excellence.

In 2005, the entrepreneur Richard Caring bought The Ivy and the Caprice Holdings group (which owns Le Caprice in the St James's area of London, J. Sheekey near Leicester Square, Scotts in Mount Street and 34 in Grosvenor Square). In 2007, Fernando Peire returned to The Ivy as Director of The Ivy and The Club at The Ivy. Gary Lee, who had previously been in charge of private functions at The Ivy, returned as head chef and was appointed executive chef in 2008. Executive chef director of Caprice Holdings restaurants (now Caprice Group) is Tim Hughes since 27 June 2005.

== The Ivy Club ==
In September 2008, The Club at The Ivy, a private members' club with a hidden entrance via an adjacent flower-shop, was opened on the three floors above the restaurant, with membership (drawn primarily from creative industries and the arts) "as hard to get as a table at The Ivy itself" according to the author A. A. Gill.

Later renamed The Ivy Club, it has the Piano Bar on its lowest floor; above this are two dining facilities known as the Drawing Room and the Library, and on the top floor is an entertainment space known as the Loft, including an outdoor terrace.

Its former director was Fernando Peire who left in June 2021, the former senior maître d' (star of the Channel 5 TV series The Restaurant Inspector).

== The Ivy Asia ==
The Ivy Asia is a restaurant coming under the Ivy Restaurant group, offering Asian-inspired food and drink.

The original Ivy Asia restaurant launched in May 2021 in the Ivy Manchester Spinningfields branch. Multiple branches have opened across the UK and Ireland since, including Dublin, Cardiff, Brighton, Liverpool, London (Chelsea, Mayfair and St Paul's) and Leeds.

== The Ivy Collection ==
In 2011, the company planned to open the first Ivy Café, in London's Mayfair; however, this did not take place.

Since 2014, the company has opened over 40 spin-off restaurants, the Ivy Collection, known as Ivy Cafés and Ivy Brasseries. Caprice Holdings opened the Ivy Market Grill in Covent Garden in 2014.

In September 2025, The Ivy Collection opened a new Ivy Brasserie on Northcote Road in Battersea, marking the group's 44th location in the UK.

== See also ==
- List of restaurants in London
