= Charles & Co. =

American interior design firm

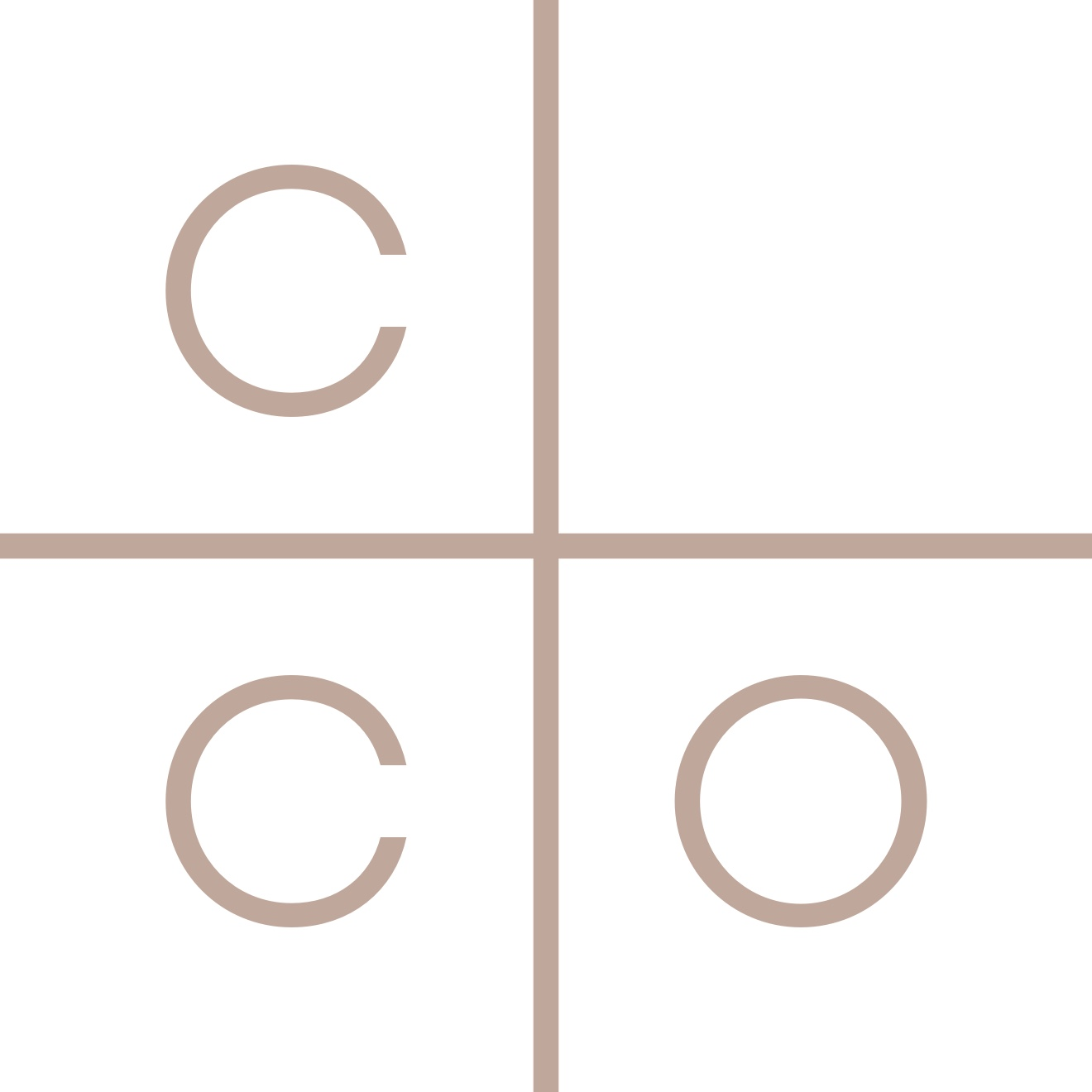
- Company type: Private
- Industry: Interior design
- Headquarters: United States
- Key people: Vicky Charles; Julia Corden
- Website: charlesandco.com

Charles & Co. is a global interior design firm, with offices in both New York City and Los Angeles in the United States. It was founded in 2016 by Vicky Charles and Julia Corden. The firm has been responsible for redesigning commercial and residential spaces.

== Background ==
Charles & Co. was founded by Julia Corden and Vicky Charles in 2016. Prior to creating Charles & Co., Charles served as Head of Design for Soho House, while Corden worked in film and television. Charles left her role at Soho House to start her own interior design firm, having previously worked with designers such as Ilse Crawford and Martin Brudnizki. They have global clientele, and it has been reported they have a number of celebrity clients.

In December 2018, Charles & Co. was listed on Architectural Digest's AD100. A year later, The Hollywood Reporter listed the company as one of the top interior design firms in Los Angeles. They have also been listed in the AD100 list in 2020 and 2021.

== Founders ==
Vicky Charles is a co-founder of the company. She was also listed as one of Architectural Digest's top 100 designers in 2019 and 2020.

Julia, (née Carey), a British businesswoman, is also a co-founder and CEO of the company. She is married to late night talk show host James Corden and lives in Los Angeles with her husband and three children.
