= Victory Museum (Baku) =

History museum in Moscow, Russia

- Zəfər muzeyi
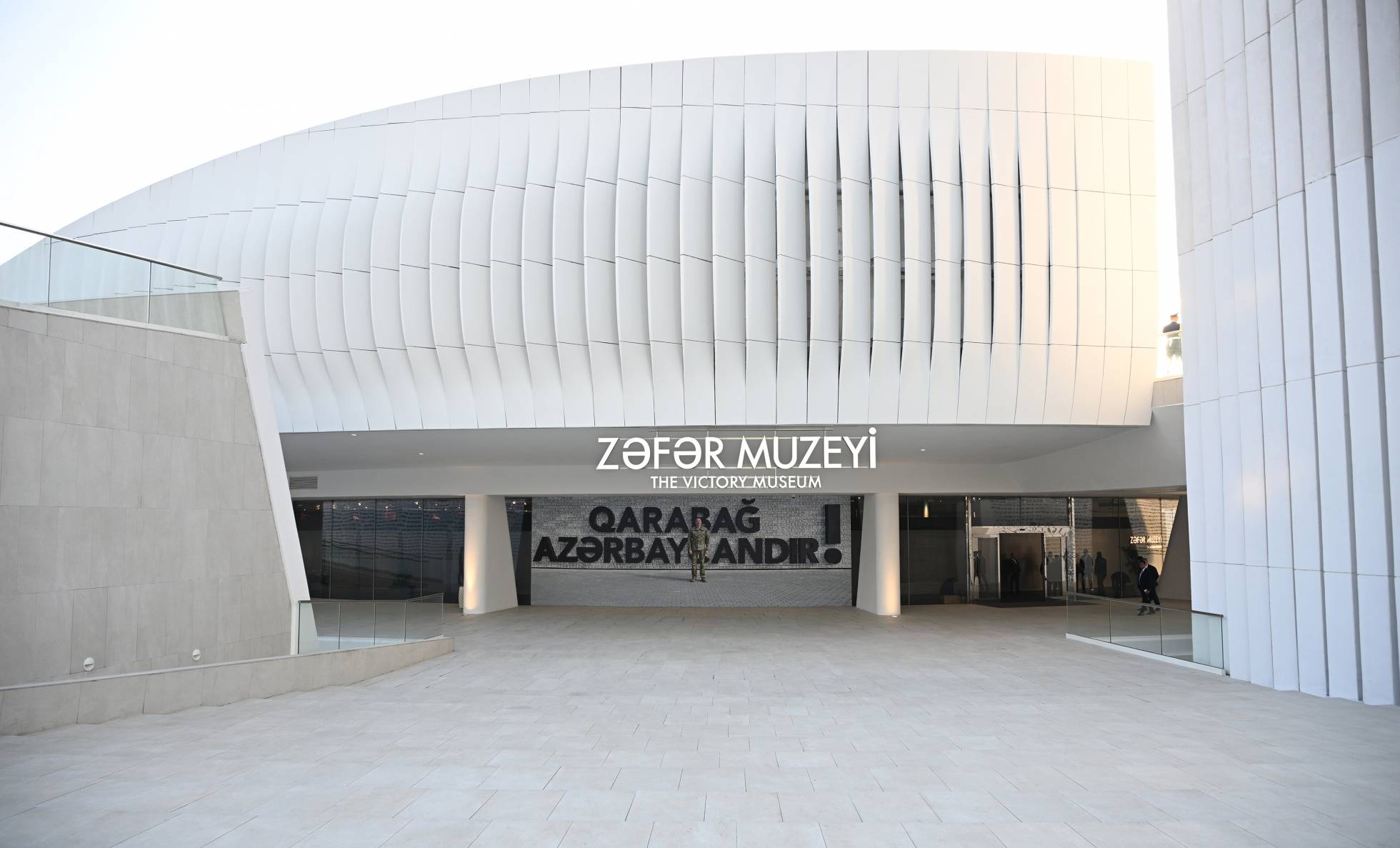
- Established: 8 November 2025
- Location: 8 November Avenue, Khatai District, Baku, Azerbaijan
- Coordinates: 40°22′34″N 49°52′01″E
- Type: History museum

The Victory Museum (Azerbaijani: Zəfər muzeyi), is a history museum located in Baku at Victory Park. Work on the museum began on following a decree of the president of Azerbaijan Ilham Aliyev don 3 December 2020, a decision was made to establish a Patriotic War Memorial Complex and a Victory Museum in Baku. On 8 November 2025, on the fifth anniversary of Victory Day, the Victory Museum was opened with the participation of President Aliyev and First Lady and Vice President Mehriban Aliyeva.

The museum features exhibits and memorials concerning the Second Nagorno-Karabakh War.

== Exposition ==
The Victory Museum's exhibition was developed using modern museum concepts and multimedia technologies. The museum comprises eight thematic exhibition halls, each dedicated to specific historical stages and events related to Karabakh and Eastern Zangezur.

The exhibition halls have the following names:

1. Karabakh and Eastern Zangezur. History of the Centuries
2. "The Armenian-Azerbaijani Conflict: A Look into History
3. The 44-Day Patriotic War. Operation Iron Fist.
4. Glorious Victory. Liberation of Shusha
5. The Path of Heroes
6. Karabakh is Azerbaijan!
7. Restoration of State Sovereignty. September 20, 2023
8. Karabakh and Eastern Zangezur. Revival
