= The Restaurant Inspector =

- Starring: Fernando Peire
- Narrated by: Holly Aird (Series 1); Caroline Quentin (Series 2)
- Country of origin: United Kingdom
- Original language: English
- No. of series: 2
- No. of episodes: 12

Production
- Running time: 60 minutes

Original release
- Network: Channel 5
- Release: 6 June 2011 – 25 June 2012

Related
- The Hotel Inspector; The Business Inspector

The Restaurant Inspector is an observational documentary television series, fronted by Fernando Peire, which airs on British terrestrial television station, Channel 5. It is a spin-off from the popular British programme The Hotel Inspector. The first series, narrated by Holly Aird, commenced on 6 June 2011. Series 2, narrated by Caroline Quentin, began on 3 May 2012.

In this makeover reality show about struggling British restaurants, Peire, director of London's world-famous The Ivy restaurant, goes undercover to sample the venue, food and service before revealing his identity and offering advice.

== Episodes ==
=== Series 1 (2011) ===
No.	Establishment	Original release date	Viewers (millions)
1	Alexandra's Ristorante	6 June 2011	1.22
Fernando Peire advises restaurateurs in Ramsgate.
2	Bamber's Restaurant	13 June 2011	1.16
Peire goes to Bamber's Restaurant in Bridgnorth, Shropshire. Since 23 September 2011; it became the Nomis Restaurant and overhauled under the new owner, Simon Szymanski.
3	The Vineyard	20 June 2011	1.29
Fernando Peire helps a restaurant in Northampton.
4	The Olive Mill	27 June 2011	1.54
Fernando Peire, director of London's The Ivy, goes to a roadside restaurant in Somerset.
5	Horeau's Fish & Seafood Restaurant	4 July 2011	1.17
Fernando Peire travels to an East Sussex village. Still open
6	Mamma Rosa Ristorante	11 July 2011	1.10
Fernando visits a dated Italian restaurant in south London. Closed

=== Series 2 (2012) ===
No.	Establishment	Original release date	Viewers (millions)
1	The Maharaja Tandoori	3 May 2012	0.94
In the first episode of the second series; The Restaurant Inspector, Fernando Peire, travels to London to The Maharaja Tandoori, which is run by the owner, Ahmed Faruk, and his son, Nash. When Fernando arrives he notices that the owner and his son are struggling to get customers through the door of the restaurant, the Restaurant Inspector can see why they are having trouble and aims to bring the restaurant back in touch with the times by changing the decor. In order for Fernando to help them avoid closure, he aims to also change the issues with the owner's son, and help him to prove to his dad that he is ready to take over the restaurant. Closed down
2	Iggs	10 May 2012	Less than 0.80
Fernando Peire travels to Edinburgh to help re-invigorate a Spanish restaurant. Closed down
3	UK Mama	17 May 2012	Less than 0.83
Fernando goes to an Afro-Caribbean restaurant founded by a Nigerian in Sheffield 17 years ago. Closed down
4	Tarragon	11 June 2012	0.85
Tarragon is a fine-dining French restaurant in East Sussex that is failing fast, and first-time restaurateur Nigel Fright and award-winning chef John Cameron are at a loss as to why business is so bad. Fernando is convinced that Tarragon needs to ditch its fancy ways to attract customers, he aims to persuade both owner and chef that the frogs' legs and snails need to go, along with the restaurant's name and décor.
5	Acorns	18 June 2012	1.05
Fernando goes to Acorns, a roadside restaurant in Somerset.
6	Nook & Harbour	25 June 2012	0.99
Fernando goes to a seaside restaurant in Weston-super-Mare. Closed down
