= Richard Caring =

British businessman (born 1948)

- Born: Richard Allan Caring; 4 June 1948 (age 78); Finchley, London, England
- Occupation: Businessman
- Spouses: Jacqueline Stead (m. 1971; div. 2016); Patricia Mondinni (m. 2018)
- Children: 6

Richard Allan Caring (born 4 June 1948) is a British businessman. He initially built a business, International Clothing Designs, supplying Hong Kong-manufactured fashion to UK retailers. In 2004 he diversified his business interest into property, restaurants and nightclubs. He is the chairman of Caprice Holdings, which owns and operates The Ivy chain of restaurants. Caring is commonly referred to as the 'King of Mayfair' by British media as a result of his ownership of multiple private members' club and restaurants across the Mayfair area of London, UK.

== Early life ==
Caring was born on 4 June 1948, the middle child of three born to Louis Caringi, an Italian-American GI, stationed in London during World War II, and Sylvia Parnes, a Jewish-immigrant nurse who met him in the ambulance on his way to hospital, and cared for him during his recovery.

After deciding to stay in London after the war, the couple married. Louis Caringi anglicized his surname to Caring, and set up in the clothing industry in offices off Great Portland Street; Louis Caring Originals sourced knitwear for retailers including Marks & Spencer.

Caring grew up in Finchley, London. His prowess at golf, playing off scratch, resulted in him representing Middlesex at county level, and being accepted into Millfield School in Street, Somerset on a 10-shilling-a-week sporting scholarship.

== Career ==
=== Clothing ===
Caring left school aged 16 and joined a shopping centre development company as an office boy, before joining Louis Caring Originals, his father's dress manufacturing business that employed seven people:

My parents thought it important I got practical work experience – they weren't bothered about university. I understand the thought process, "Let's throw him into work." But looking back, I would very much have liked to go to university. You get a much broader mindset.

At that time, the family was in financial difficulties, which threatened losing their home. Caring and his then girlfriend made a range of mini-skirts that cost £2 to make, selling them for 69s 6d (£3.475 in decimalisation). With an initial target of 200 a week, after a few years they were selling 25,000 a week:

We saved the house in the end. Maybe that's why I'm driven, because I saw it all happen at a young age.

In 1971 Caring first visited Hong Kong, where labour and materials were far cheaper than in Britain. Until this point, Hong Kong made basic clothing cheaply, such as underpants. Spending a year living out of a suitcase and resident in one hotel, Caring educated local manufacturers through producing the same garment over and over again to get the quality right. As a result, he became one of the first western high fashion buyers to develop localised Chinese relationships, and returned to the UK to sell the new high quality but cheaper garments to UK retailers.

Forming International Clothing Designs (ICD) to exploit the new opportunity, Caring moved his family permanently to Hong Kong in 1979. Due to its international trading nature, the company's structure and holdings are complex, held through a series of offshore companies and trusts, making it hard to detect Caring's full earnings from the fashion world. The manoeuvre worked, and Caring cornered the market in fast fashion. ICD at its height supplied 70% of the clothing sold by British high street retailers, supplying Marks & Spencer, Mothercare and Next.

It was through ICD and its trading that he met and developed his relationship with Sir Philip Green. ICD was the dominant supplier to Arcadia Group, the then Green-owned fashion retail chain that included Dorothy Perkins, Topshop and Top Man. Arcadia Group went into administration in November 2020. This was not the normal retailer and supplier set-up but described as more of a partnership, with Caring presenting Green with a Ferrari F430 Spider for his 50th birthday:

I speak to him every day. We're more than friends – I think we'd do anything for each other. We're like brothers. We've grown up together and experienced lots of good times and tough times.

For less than a year, Caring worked for Green. In 2001, Caring invested in Green's British Home Stores (BHS), owning 22.5% of the retailer and earning £100m in dividends, before disposing of his shares in 2006. Caring supplied Next plc via a joint venture company NV, but sold his share in the 1990s back to the retailer. He built a joint venture to supply Freemans catalogues, again now sold to the partner. He also co-developed the Together brand, which after buying out partners he sold to German catalogue firm Otto Versand. In 2004–05, ICD saw sales drop to £74.2m from £85.5m, making a pre-tax loss of £523,644 from a £3.99m profit the year before after an exceptional loss on the sale of Amanda Wakeley's designer label. In 2007, Caring looked at buying the distressed Prada brand.

In 2009, ICD employed 250 people and was a smaller operation in the UK than it had previously been.

=== Property ===
Caring's first UK property deal was the £45m purchase of a 20.6% stake in the Camden Market complex in 2004, that he purchased from Bebo Kobo and OD Kobo. In 2014, Camden Market was sold to Israeli-Cypriot billionaire businessman Teddy Sagi.

Caring bought Wentworth Golf Club in 2004, in partnership with then minority shareholder, airport hotel entrepreneur Surinder Arora; they paid £130m, £50m more than the club's book value at the time: He sold Wentworth in 2014 for £135m to Reignwood Investments, a Chinese holding company associated with billionaire Yan Bin.

Caring purchased the former US Navy building in London's Grosvenor Square in 2009.

=== Restaurants and private members' clubs ===
After buying Wentworth Golf Club, Caring wanted to improve the catering there and approached Le Caprice restaurant in summer 2005; during discussions it emerged that the management of Caprice Holdings group was looking for a buyer. Six weeks later, Caring secured a £31.5m deal to take over Caprice Holdings, owner of The Ivy, Le Caprice and J Sheekey, as well as Italian restaurant Daphne's, Vietnamese restaurant Bam-Bou and Moroccan restaurant Pasha. The Ivy was later developed into restaurant chain The Ivy Collection. Caprice Holdings also owns Sexy Fish, which was launched in 2015.

Caring began to reshape the group, which created much media coverage for someone who previously preferred to stay out of the limelight. In 2005 he added fish restaurant Scott's and catering firm Urban Productions, but sold Pasha to Algerian restaurateur Tony Kitous. He also bought Signature Restaurants from Luke Johnson for £57m, owner of mid-market Strada and Belgo chains.

In 2006 he bought Rivington, a two-restaurant group independently set up by Caprice Holding's chef director Mark Hix. He sold Strada in 2007 for £140m. In 2007 he purchased the Birley Group (Annabel's, Harry's Bar, Mark's Club) for £95m including the vast art collection, concluded just a few months before Mark Birley's death.

Caring was one of the founders of Cote restaurant in 2007; he sold his 51% share in the chain in 2013, when the business was sold to private equity firm CBPE for £100m.

In 2008 he agreed a leveraged buyout of 28 small investors in private members' club Soho House, taking 80% for £105m, with the remainder held by Nick Jones who remained CEO, also his partner in Cecconi's. He was a shareholder in Carluccio's; the restaurant chain was sold to Landmark Group in 2010.

The speed with which Caring built his restaurant chain resulted in many questioning his reasoning, on both a strategic level as well as the high purchase prices paid. He has been dubbed by some as "the Lex Luthor of Mayfair" for his apparent supermarket-sweep approach to buying companies. Other critics say he is brandishing a credit card, playing a high-stakes game of Monopoly, buying every square he lands on.

In 2009 Caring insisted he had a masterplan:

I spotted an international gap in the market. In the restaurant business, there are single brands, but not a group of brands – which is what we do. There is only one Ivy, one Annabel's – there is nothing like them. A group of top-notch brands like them – that is what we're trying to achieve. There is a grand plan and it starts with building strength in London.

At that time, Caring's strategy was built around three brands: Annabel's, including the Birley clubs (Mark's, Harry's Bar, George and Bath & Racquets); Soho House; and Caprice, the restaurant link between the two club chains. The brands opened in several countries including: Le Caprice New York; Cecconi's Miami; Soho House, via £130m credit line supplied by HBoS, in Berlin, Chicago, Miami and Los Angeles.

Restaurant critic AA Gill once commented:

He's setting up the restaurant equivalent of LVMH. He's spending a lot more on these businesses than they’re probably worth, but eventually he'll have a portfolio that, as a brand, is worth far more than the sum of its parts.

== Politics ==
A friend of Lord Levy, Caring lent £2m to the Labour Party to fund the 2005 United Kingdom general election. Caring was not later implicated or named as part of the Cash for Honours investigation. The loan monies have since been repaid.

Caring has donated to the Conservative Party on several occasions, mainly in the form of auction prizes. This includes the hire of Annabel's in 2008 for the Conservative Party's Black and White Ball in Battersea Park, which was as an auction prize that raised £70,000.

He was also recorded as donating just over £50,000 to the party in 2010. In 2012 he was recorded as donating £170,000. This was followed by a £290,000 donation in the third quarter of 2015.

== Philanthropy ==
After the 2004 Indian Ocean tsunami, Caring donated £1m to the relief effort. He supports the NSPCC at its Fresh Start centre in Camden, to combat child abuse and paedophilia.

In 2005, he organised a charity costume "Napoleonic Ball" for the NSPCC in St Petersburg's Catherine Palace, Russia, featuring a performance by Sir Elton John. Caring spent £8m flying in 450 guests by private jet, including Bob Geldof and former US president Bill Clinton, raising £11m. The Guardian has reported that Caring donated $1m to the Clinton Foundation.

== Personal life ==
Caring married his first wife, Jacqueline Stead, in 1971. She is an Aldershot-born model and the daughter of a retired British Army major. They have two sons, who were raised in Hong Kong: Jamie, a vice-president of MTV Networks Europe; and Ben, who works for Soho House.

The family lived in Hampstead, north London, in a house known as the Versailles of London. He has homes in Hong Kong, and owns the former stable block of Pixton Park, Dulverton, on the Somerset/Devon border.

On 26 December 2004, Caring and his sons were scuba diving in the Maldives when the Indian Ocean tsunami occurred. Protected by an atoll, they had "felt a blip, but it could have been a big boat." Philip Green sent his private jet to pick the family up, and Caring donated £1 million to the tsunami relief fund.

In 2016, Caring and Stead divorced in a high-profile case, which was described as "Britain's biggest divorce". He left his wife to move into a £32 million home in St John's Wood with 35-year-old Brazilian Patricia Mondinni, with whom he had a son. In March 2018, Caring married Mondinni. The couple also have three daughters.

His friends include Sir Philip Green and Scottish philanthropist Sir Tom Hunter. His family relations include stockbroker Anthony Parnes and his son Michael Parnes, CEO of stock brokerage Old Park Lane Capital.

According to the Sunday Times Rich List in 2021, Caring's net worth is estimated to be £1.005 billion.

=== Controversy ===
In December 2014, Michelle Young accused Philip Green, Caring and Simon Cowell of helping her ex-husband, businessman Scot Young, to hide assets and so avoid paying maintenance to his ex-wife and their two daughters. In February 2015, a note from HSBC bankers in Caring's files mentioned that Philip Green's wife Tina Green had been holding part of Caring's assets in cash on his behalf, prompting suspicions that Caring might have funnelled profits through Tina Green to avoid paying taxes on his assets.

Following BHS's collapse into administration in 2016, leaving a pension fund deficit of £571m, it was reported that Caring had refused to reveal how much profit he had made from selling his shares in the company, and also refused to attend a parliamentary committee in person to give evidence.
