= Sexy Fish =

London restaurant

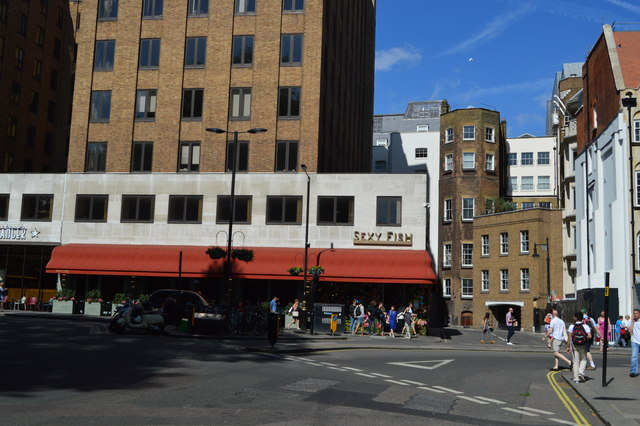
- Interactive map of Sexy Fish

Restaurant information
- Established: 19 October 2015
- Owner: Caprice Holdings group
- Food type: Asian seafood
- Location: London, W1J 6BR, United Kingdom
- Coordinates: 51.50935°N 0.1444°W
- Seating capacity: 200
- Website: Official website

Sexy Fish is a restaurant at Berkeley Square House, Mayfair in London, United Kingdom, on the south-east corner of Berkeley Square. The restaurant is part of the Caprice Holdings group, whose chairman is Richard Caring. Sexy Fish opened to the public on 19 October 2015. The restaurant serves Asian fish and seafood and seats up to 200 people in the main restaurant on ground level.

== Art and design ==
Sexy Fish was designed by Martin Brudnizki Design Studio. The restaurant houses installations from international names in the worlds of architecture, art, and fashion, including 19 of Frank Gehry’s iconic Fish Lamps, which hang above the bar and a 4-metre-long (13 ft) glossy black silicone crocodile also designed by the architect. Two patinated bronze mermaids as well as a large bronze relief panel by Damien Hirst adorn the bar. The ceiling mural was designed by Michael Roberts, who served as Style Editor-at-Large of Vanity Fair. The restaurant also has floors of Esmeralda onyx marble from Iran.
