= Victory Park (Baku) =

Park in Baku, Azerbaijan

- Zəfər Parkı
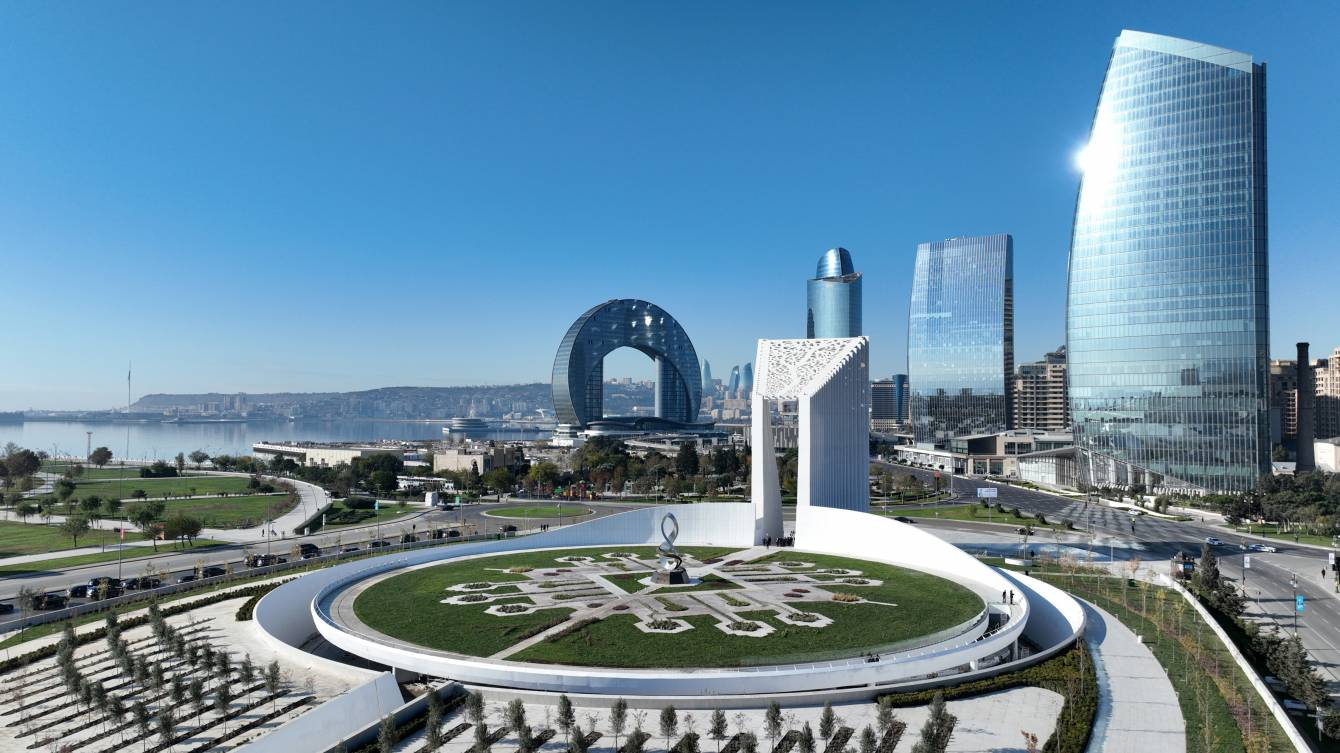
- Victory Park in November 2024
- Interactive map of Victory Park
- Location: Baku, Azerbaijan
- Coordinates: 40°22′34″N 49°52′01″E
- Area: 9.16 ha (22.6 acres)
- Authorized: 8 November 2024

Victory Park (Azerbaijani: Zəfər Parkı) is a park in Baku, Azerbaijan. It is located in the Khatai District on 8 November Avenue, near the Baku Seafront Boulevard. The park is dedicated to Azerbaijan’s victory in the Second Karabakh War.

== History ==
By a decree of the president of Azerbaijan Ilham Aliyev dated 3 December 2020, a decision was made to establish a Patriotic War Memorial Complex and a Victory Museum in Baku, in commemoration of Azerbaijan’s victory in the Second Karabakh War and in honour of those who died.

On 27 September 2023, on Memorial Day, President Aliyev visited Victory Park while it was under construction.

On 8 November 2024, on Victory Day, the park was officially opened with the participation of President Aliyev.

On 8 November 2025, marking the fifth anniversary of Victory Day, the Victory Museum located in the lower part of the park was opened with the participation of President Ilham Aliyev and First Lady Mehriban Aliyeva.

== Overview ==
Victory Park is located in the Khatai District of Baku on 8 November Avenue, near the Baku Boulevard. The total area of the park is 9.16 hectares, of which 4.24 hectares are landscaped green areas.

The park includes the Triumphal Arch, a 9.9-metre memorial monument, and an 8.8-metre-high Wall of Memory bearing the names of fallen soldiers.

The Triumphal Arch stands at the entrance to the park. The arch is 44 metres high and 22 metres wide, with 44 columns symbolising the 44-day Second Karabakh War. A tree element depicted on the upper part of the arch is described as symbolising development, prosperity, and the path leading to victory.

A Victory Monument dedicated to 8 November is located near the entrance area, and the landscaping around it incorporates decorative patterns described as inspired by Karabakh carpet motifs.

== Victory Museum ==
The Victory Museum is located in the lower part of Victory Park. According to official accounts, the museum was created to preserve the memory of the path that led to the restoration of Azerbaijan’s territorial control and to commemorate participants of the Second Karabakh War and those who died.

An installation titled "Iron Fist" is placed at the museum entrance, and excerpts from speeches by President Ilham Aliyev are presented in the museum space. Names of those who died in the Second Karabakh War are engraved on surrounding walls; a water feature is described as symbolising continuity of life and the idea of immortality through heroism.
