= Martin Brudnizki =

Swedish architect

Martin Brudnizki is a Swedish interior architect and product designer, based in both London and New York.

== Career ==
Born in Stockholm in 1966, Martin Brudnizki moved to London in 1990 to study Interior Architecture and Design at American University in London. In 2000 he founded Martin Brudnizki Design Studio in London, before opening a New York studio in 2012. Specialising in restaurants, bars, hotels and private clubs, he has created interiors including Sexy Fish and Annabel's. He has worked with Rosewood Hotels & Resorts, The Royal Academy of Arts and Rocco Forte Hotels among others.

== Awards and recognition ==
Brudnizki has been described as ‘one of the best restaurant and hotel designers of his generation’ by Wallpaper and is regularly listed within both the London Evening Standard 1000 Most Influential People in the UK and House and Garden Top 100 Leading Interior Designers. In 2015 he was listed in Wallpaper's Power 200 and in 2016 was listed as one of Debrett's 500 Most Influential People, Debrett's People of Today. In 2021, he was voted one of the '50 Best Interior Designers in the UK' by Country and Townhouse.

In 2015, Brudnizki launched And Objects, a dedicated design studio.

== Private life ==
Brudnizki lives at Binderton House, near West Dean, West Sussex with his partner, Jonathan Brook.
