= Amresco =

Defunct American financial company based in Texas

- Type: Subsidiary
- Industry: Financial services
- Predecessor: First Republic Bank Corporation
- Founded: 1990; 36 years ago
- Founder: North Carolina National Bank and the Federal Deposit Insurance Corporation
- Defunct: 2001
- Fate: Bankrupt
- Headquarters: Dallas, Texas, United States
- Area served: Texas
- Owner: North Carolina National Bank until 1993

Amresco was an American financial services provider based in Texas and was the new name given to "Financial Resource Management, Inc.", a subsidiary of the NCNB Texas National Bank in 1992.

The subsidiary was created by North Carolina National Bank in 1990 to hold and service the $11 billion portfolio of the failed Dallas-based "First Republic Bank Corporation" that North Carolina National Bank acquired in 1988 from the Federal Deposit Insurance Corporation. Prior to the creation of this subsidiary, the activities for which FRMI/Amresco was responsible were conducted in the North Carolina National Bank's name.

== History ==
North Carolina National Bank was the winning bidder among several competing money center banks for FRBC, the largest banking organization in Texas. Part of the agreement between North Carolina National Bank and the Federal Deposit Insurance Corporation was that North Carolina National Bank would not bear losses from the substandard assets of the failed FRBC banks, a typical arrangement when the Federal Deposit Insurance Corporation found a buyer for a failed institution. The volume of these assets was so great that Federal Deposit Insurance Corporation did not have the manpower to take them over in their traditional way. On the other hand, FRBC already had a large corps of employees who had been working these assets with considerable expertise. These now became North Carolina National Bank employees. In addition, many more employees from the failed institutions would be repositioned to work these sub-par assets and to collect on them for the Federal Deposit Insurance Corporation. North Carolina National Bank would earn fees on the collections.

This group was not as efficient as it had been prior to the Federal Deposit Insurance Corporation's control and the new bank's name suffered. Eventually the "workout group", as this subunit was called, was spun off into a separate subsidiary called Financial Resource Management, Inc., and later, renamed Amresco (for "American Resources Company").

North Carolina National Bank merged with another east coast bank, C&S/Sovran Corp. in 1992. Realizing the beating the NCNB letters had taken in Texas (which represented roughly half of the old NCNB's holdings), the merged entity was called NationsBank. NationsBank eventually acquired Bank of America and adopted this institution's name as its own.

In 1993, Amresco was entirely spun off from the company. Amresco had also won some Federal Savings and Loan Insurance Corporation and Resolution Trust Corporation contracts to manage the assets of the failed savings and loan institutions. Its big plan, however, was to market itself to client banks — institutions which had not failed — to provide collection services for them.

The Federal Deposit Insurance Corporation considered this a conflict of interest, however, and as long as the FRBC contract was still a primary source of activity, the client bank's plan was stuck in neutral. The "Resolution Trust Corporation Completion Act" of 1993 (1993 RTC Act) effectively gave the Federal Deposit Insurance Corporation control of all savings institutions as well, and a virtual monopoly on loan workout contracts. Amresco saw a serious decline in employee morale as its future looked grim. The name, NCNB, became the butt of many jokes, such as standing for "No Cash for No Body", "Nobody Cares, Nobody Bothers", and employees were even beginning to rumble that it meant "No Compensation, No Benefits". Former bankers whose careers had been built on contentious activities such as collections, bankruptcies and litigation had little skill at such things as marketing for new clients, and frankly, the decimation of the southwestern economy of the late 1980s and early 1990s was finally coming to end.

== Mortgage origination and servicing ==
Amresco transitioned into mortgage and commercial loan servicing, although it still lists debtor-in-possession (bankruptcy) financing among its services.

Later in 1998, when the collections business began to slow, Amresco grew into the business of buying and securitizing subprime mortgages and commercial loans. After the Russian bond default and the collapse of Long Term Capital Management Amresco found itself unable to economically sell these assets. It took three years but ultimately Amresco went the way of so many of its own clients and it too defaulted on its remaining debt.
