= Park Pobedy (Saint Petersburg Metro) =

Saint Petersburg Metro Station

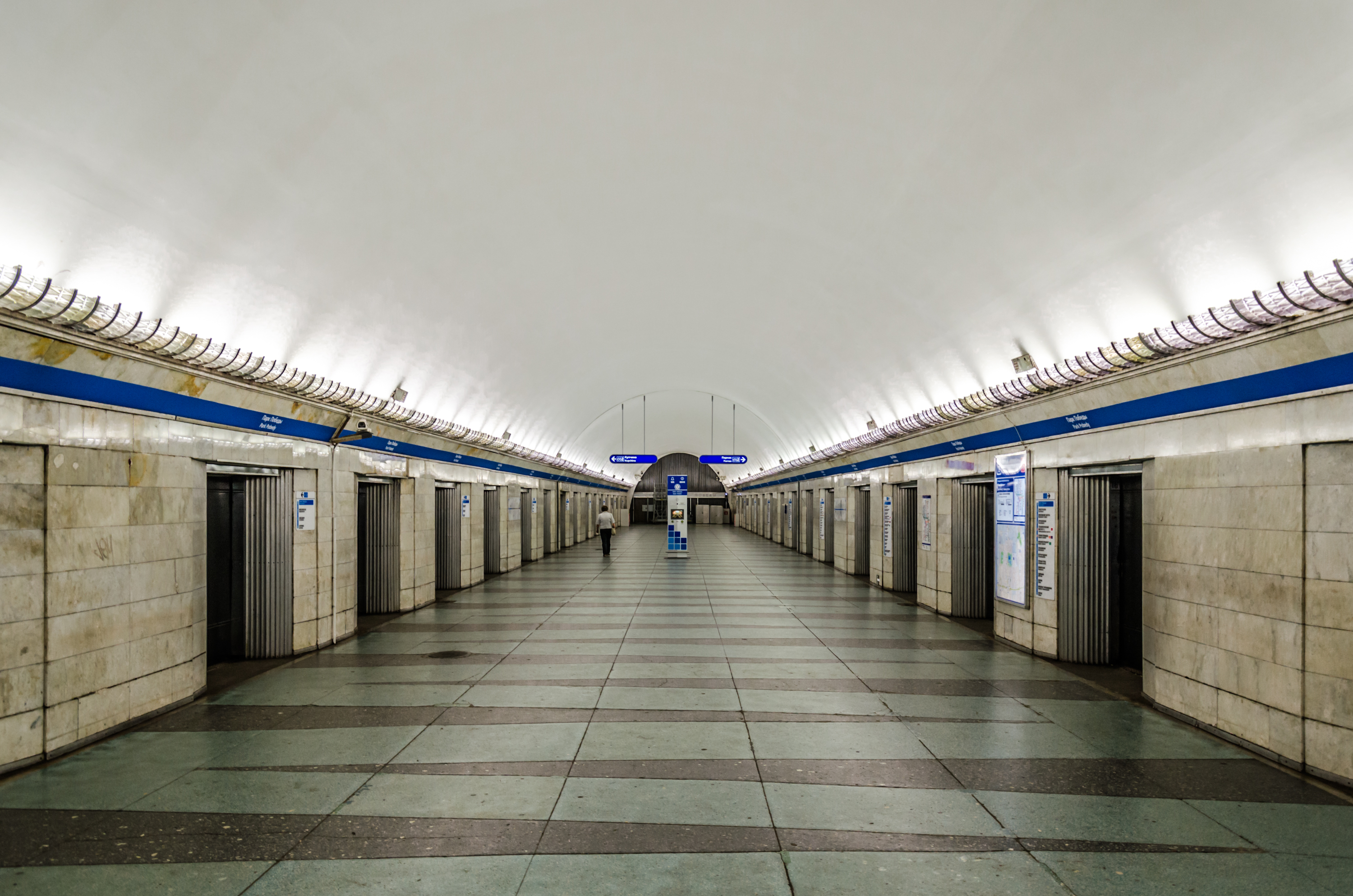
- Station Hall

General information
- Location: Moskovsky District; Saint Petersburg; Russia
- Coordinates: 59°51′58.90″N 30°19′18.49″E
- System: Saint Petersburg Metro station
- Owner: Saint Petersburg Metro
- Line: Moskovsko–Petrogradskaya Line
- Platforms: 1 (Island platform)
- Tracks: 2

Construction
- Structure type: Underground

History
- Opened: 29 April 1961; 65 years ago
- Opening: 6 August 2027; 11 months' time
- Closed: 29 June 2025 (for reconstruction)
- Rebuilt: 2025-2027
- Electrified: Third rail

Services
Preceding station	Saint Petersburg Metro	Following station
Elektrosila towards Parnas	Line 2	Moskovskaya towards Kupchino
Route map
Location

Park Pobedy (Russian: Парк Побе́ды) (literally "Victory Park") is a station on the Moskovsko-Petrogradskaya Line of the Saint Petersburg Metro. It was opened on 29 April 1961.

The above-ground vestibule was designed by A.S. Getskin and V.P. Shuvalova, and the subterranean elements of the project were designed by architect A.K. Andreev and engineer G.A. Skobennikov.

The station is 35 metres (115 ft) deep, and belongs to one of the deepest underground systems in the world. It was among the first on the Metro to introduce a "closed-type" design where the running tunnels and tracks are isolated from the platform by thick walls, and access to trains is regulated with automatically opening and closing platform screen doors - a world first.

On 29 June 2025, the station was closed for reconstruction.
