= Le Caprice =

Restaurant in Mayfair, London

- Interactive map of Le Caprice

Restaurant information
- Established: 1947
- Closed: 2020
- Owner: Richard Caring
- Previous owners: Mario Gallati (1947–1975); Chris Corbin and Jeremy King (1981–2000)
- Location: 20 Arlington Street, St James's, London, United Kingdom
- Coordinates: 51.5065°N 0.1406°W
- Website: le-caprice.co.uk

Le Caprice was a restaurant in London's St James's area famous for being frequented by celebrities. It was originally opened by Mario Gallati in 1947 at 20 Arlington St. Famous patrons included Elizabeth Taylor, Mick Jagger, Madonna, Kate Moss and Diana, Princess of Wales.

It was later run by Jeremy King and his then business partner Chris Corbin.

The business closed during the COVID-19 pandemic, and did not subsequently reopen.

== Arlington ==
In March 2024, a new restaurant opened on the old site of Le Caprice called Arlington under the helm of Jeremy King. It has been described as an 'unabashedly sentimental remastering of Le Caprice' with a similar menu and interior. It launched on 11 March 2024, following a soft opening during the week prior.

Giles Coren, writing in The Times, described the food as 'sort of stuff that you really can eat every day'. William Sitwell, writing in The Daily Telegraph, described the restaurant as a 'favourite for London’s media elite'. Tanya Gold, writing in The Spectator, said that the food was 'five stars, no notes'.
