= One Victory Park =

Coordinates: 32.785944°N 96.810270°W

One Victory Park is a skyscraper in Uptown Dallas.

On October 27, 2008 Haynes and Boone moved into One Victory Park; the firm was the first major tenant that moved into the building. The firm downsized its space to 175,000 square feet (16,300 m^{2}) of space on six floors. The offices of higher ranked employees were the same size as those of lower ranked employees so efficiency could be increased. The company announced that it was moving its headquarters in 2006.

In 2007 PlainsCapital Corporation announced that it is leasing 48,500 square feet (4,510 m^{2}) in One Victory Park; it is the second major tenant to sign a lease for space in the Victory Tower.
