= George (club) =

Club in London

Coordinates: 51.5095°N 0.1515°W

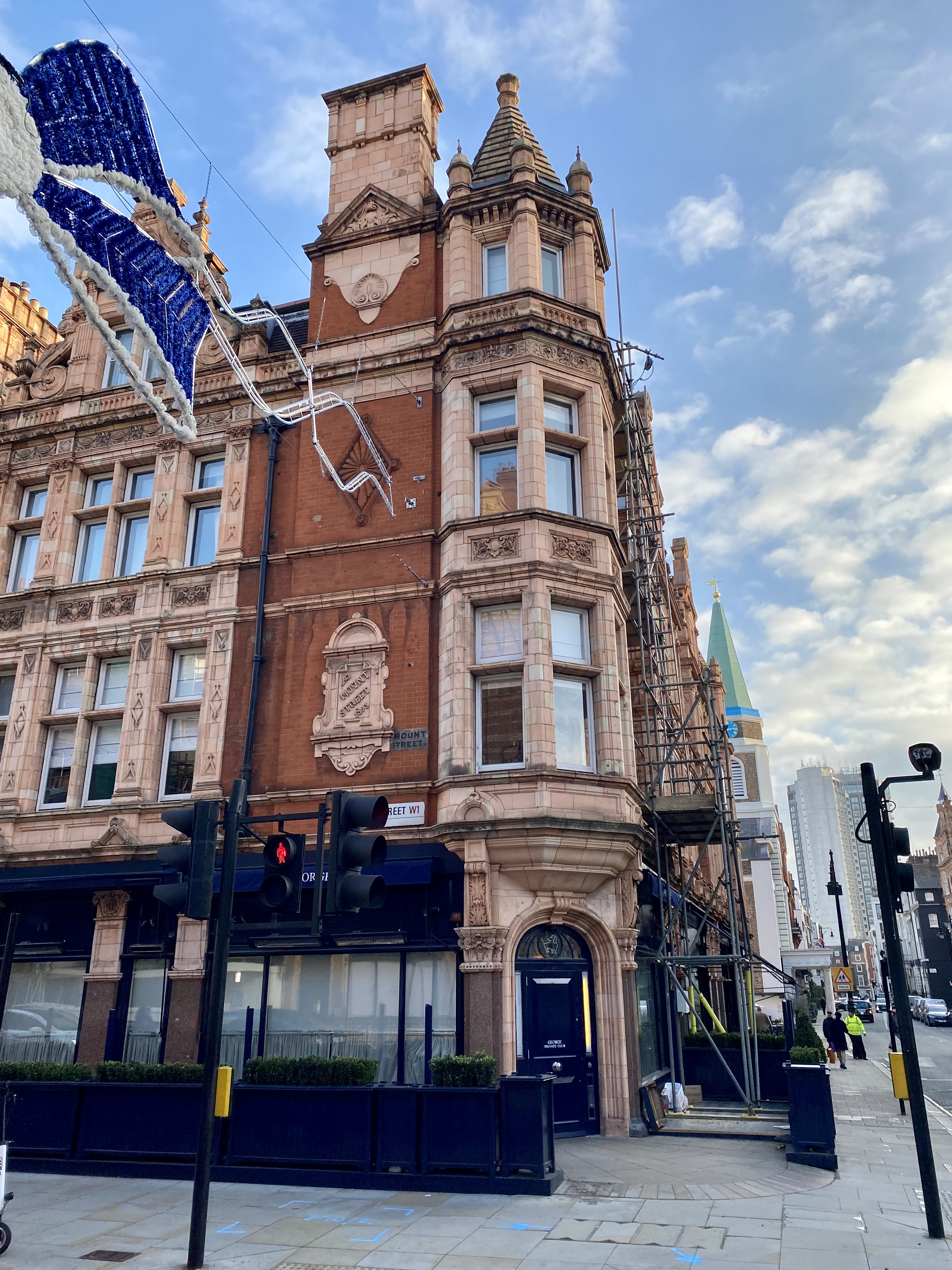
The entrance to George on the corner of Mount Street in 2022

George is a private members' club at 87-88 Mount Street in London's Mayfair district. It was established by Mark Birley in 2001. He sold the club to Richard Caring in 2007, along with his four other Mayfair clubs – Annabel's, Mark's Club, Harry's Bar, and the Bath & Racquets Club. George is a dog-friendly club.

== History ==
View of George in 2024

The club is located at 87-88 Mount Street in the Mayfair district of London. George was established by Mark Birley in 2001. The club is named for George Hobart, who was the head barman of Annabel's. Birley said that the name of the club was "just plain George, not George's or George's Bar". Birley described the ideal prospective member of George as "a reasonably well-heeled 35 to 40-year-old, who preferably takes out very pretty girls".

He had previously opened the members' clubs Annabel's in 1963 and Harry's Bar in 1979. In 2007 Birley sold his four Mayfair clubs, including George, to Richard Caring for £90 million. The club is now part of the 'Birley Clubs' owned by Caring, including Annabel's, Mark's Club, Harry's Bar, and the Bath & Racquets Club.

George had 500 requests for membership prior to its opening. The initial membership fee was £400. Prospective members must be proposed and seconded by current members of the club. Birley stated that the club would be the last he opened, saying that "I have no intention of doing anything else, for better or for worse". George was designed to offer a more relaxed and less formal setting than Birley's previous clubs.

Upon opening in 2001 the "cool section" of George was the "one farthest from the front door". Birley, Cosima von Bülow and the art dealer Harry Fane were seated there on opening day. The downstairs of George has a bar described by Birley as a "nighterie ... not a nightclub. You move downstairs at the end of dinner, sit around on sofas, have a drink, and listen to a little bit of music". A red private dining room seats 12. The George Private Bar opened in the basement of George in 2005. The George Private Bar was established by Birley's son, Robin, and his sister, India Jane, who ran Birley's clubs during his ill health.

== Food ==
The head chef upon opening was Luca dal Bosco. He had previously been at Harry's Bar under head chef Alberico Penati. Dal Bosco described the food at George as possessing the "freshness of Italian cuisine, the technique of the French, and with an English taste". Birley's great-nephew, Daniel de la Falaise, was the assistant head chef upon opening. The kitchen of George is visible to the diners and runs the length of the restaurant. The restaurant of George seats 90. There is outside seating on Mount Street.

== George and dogs ==
The club features David Hockney's sketches of his dachshunds Stanley and Boogie. Birley worried that he "[hadn't] got enough" Hockney etchings for the decoration of George as the decoration of his clubs typically took "several years to get right".

The club has a bespoke menu for pet dogs. In 2020 the club hosted a number of events to raise money for dog welfare. The events were organised by the George Dog Committee; its members include David Gandy, Carole Bamford, Yasmin and Amber Le Bon and Lily Fortescue. Birley's daughter, India Jane, hosted an exhibition of her paintings, "Canines and Companions" shortly before the opening of George.
