= Maxime's =

New York private member's club

Coordinates: 40°46′13″N 73°58′0″W

- Formation: March 2025
- Founder: Robin Birley
- Type: Private members' club
- Location: 828 Madison Avenue, New York, U.S.
- Owner: Robin Birley
- Website: www.maximesclub.com

Maxime's is a private members' club located at 828 Madison Avenue on the Upper East Side of Manhattan, New York City. It was established by Robin Birley in March 2025 as the first of his clubs outside the United Kingdom, following 5 Hertford Street and Oswald's in Mayfair, London.

Tom Holland and Zendaya attended a reception at the club in July 2026. The club has also been frequented by notable media figures, including former HBO chief executive Richard Plepler, former CNN president Jeff Zucker, and Vogue editor-in-chief Chloe Malle. Other members include KKR co-founder Henry Kravis, Citadel CEO Ken Griffin, Blackstone Group CEO Stephen Schwarzman and Searchlight Capital Partners co-founder Aerin Lauder.

== Premises ==
The property occupies the site of the former Westbury Hotel, spanning the block between East 69th and East 70th Streets. The club is named for Maxime Le Bailly, Comtesse de la Falaise, the paternal aunt of owner Robin Birley and a British model in the 1950s who later became an underground film actress.

The club is organized across two floors and includes four separate restaurants, including a French-Mediterranean restaurant, a Latin American restaurant named El Puma, a Japanese sushi counter named Hiromi, a lounge-style restaurant, along with multiple bars. Its interior design is by the Turkish-born fashion designer Rifat Ozbek, who outfitted Birley's other clubs with English countryside-style furnishings and smaller living room settings.

As with Birley's properties in London, the club was backed by Reuben Brothers, a firm founded by real estate investors David and Simon Reuben. David Reuben’s son, Jamie, earlier invested in another New York private member's club Zero Bond, and has also been reported to have been a donor to former British Prime Minister Boris Johnson.
