= Rhoda Birley =

Anglo-Irish gardener, model and artist

Lady Rhoda Birley
- Lady Rhoda Birley in her garden at Charleston Manor, Sussex, c.1970s
- Born: Rhoda Vava Mary Pike; 3 February 1899; County Carlow, Ireland
- Died: 15 June 1981 (aged 82); Sussex, England
- Other name: Rhoda Vava Mary Lecky Pike
- Occupations: Gardener; model; artist
- Known for: The gardens and festival at Charleston Manor
- Spouse: Sir Oswald Birley (m. 1921; died 1952)
- Children: Maxime de la Falaise; Mark Birley
- Relatives: Loulou de la Falaise (granddaughter); Robin Birley (grandson); India Jane Birley (granddaughter); Lucie de la Falaise (great-granddaughter)

Rhoda Vava Mary, Lady Birley (née Pike; 1899–1981) was an Anglo-Irish gardener, model, and artist, known for developing the Charleston Manor gardens and founding the Charleston Manor Festival.

== Early life and marriage ==
Rhoda Vava Mary Birley was born on 3 February 1899 in County Carlow to Catherine Henrietta Pike (née Howard; c.1858–1930) and Robert Lecky Pike (c.1858–1933). Birley's birth year is sometimes miscited as 1900.

Birley grew up in Kilknock House in County Carlow. On the 14 September 1921, Birley married the portrait painter Oswald Birley at St Mary's Church, in St Marylebone, London. The couple had two children Maxime de la Falaise, born in 1922, and Mark Birley, born in 1930.

== Career ==
In 1931, Birley and Oswald bought 12th century Charleston Manor in East Sussex. In 1932, the couple employed Walter Godfrey to restore the property, and to transform the properties barn into a concert hall. Birley designed the gardens, and planted them alongside Oswald.

Rhoda Birley founded the Charleston Manor Festival, initially calling it the Sussex Festival. The festival emerged from poetry recitals, readings and talks that Birley began organising at the Manor in 1935.

Charleston Manor was sold in 1980.

== Death and legacy ==
Birley died on the 15 June 1981 aged 82.

In 1928, William Reid Dick carved a stone bust of Birley. Birley was the inspiration for Peter Jensen's Spring 2017 Ready-to-wear collection.

== See also ==
- Charleston Farmhouse, a similarly named property also in East Sussex, which holds the similarly named "Charleston Festival"
