= Oswald's =

Private members club in Mayfair, London

Coordinates: 51.5098°N 0.1429°W

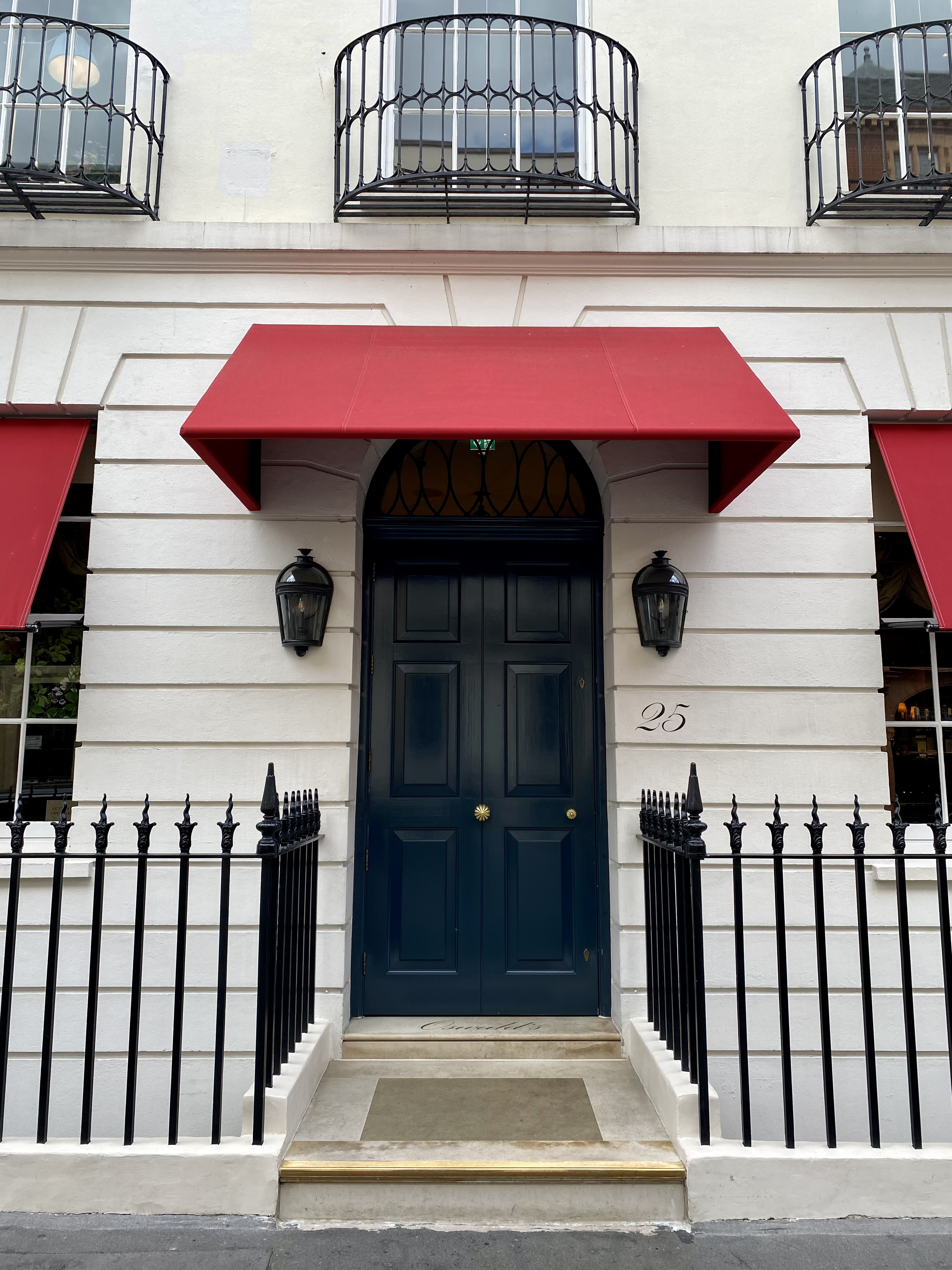
- The entrance to Oswald's in May 2022
- Formation: 2018
- Founder: Robin Birley
- Type: Private members' club
- Location: 25 Albemarle Street, Mayfair, London, England
- Owner: Robin Birley
- Website: www.oswaldsclub.com

Oswald's is a private members club located at 25 Albemarle Street in London's Mayfair district. It was established by Robin Birley in May 2018.

== History and membership ==
The house was formerly the site of the hairdressers Michael John and the club is named for the portrait artist Sir Oswald Birley, the paternal grandfather of owner Robin Birley. The interior was designed by Tom Bell and Bruce Cavell, featuring "Murano chandeliers, country house-like fireplaces and a cupola soaring to [a] cigar terrace". Oswald's was created out of a need for vintage wines at more affordable prices. The head chef is Gianluca Cossu, previously of 5 Hertford Street.

Writing in The Times, Damien Whitworth described the club as "a private dining club that has become one of the capital's most exclusive havens for senior members of the government, deep-pocketed donors, stars of show business looking to party privately, and members of the royal family". In early 2022 Oswald's was described by Annabel Sampson in Tatler as the "...most exclusive of London's private members' clubs". Oswald's has no social media accounts.

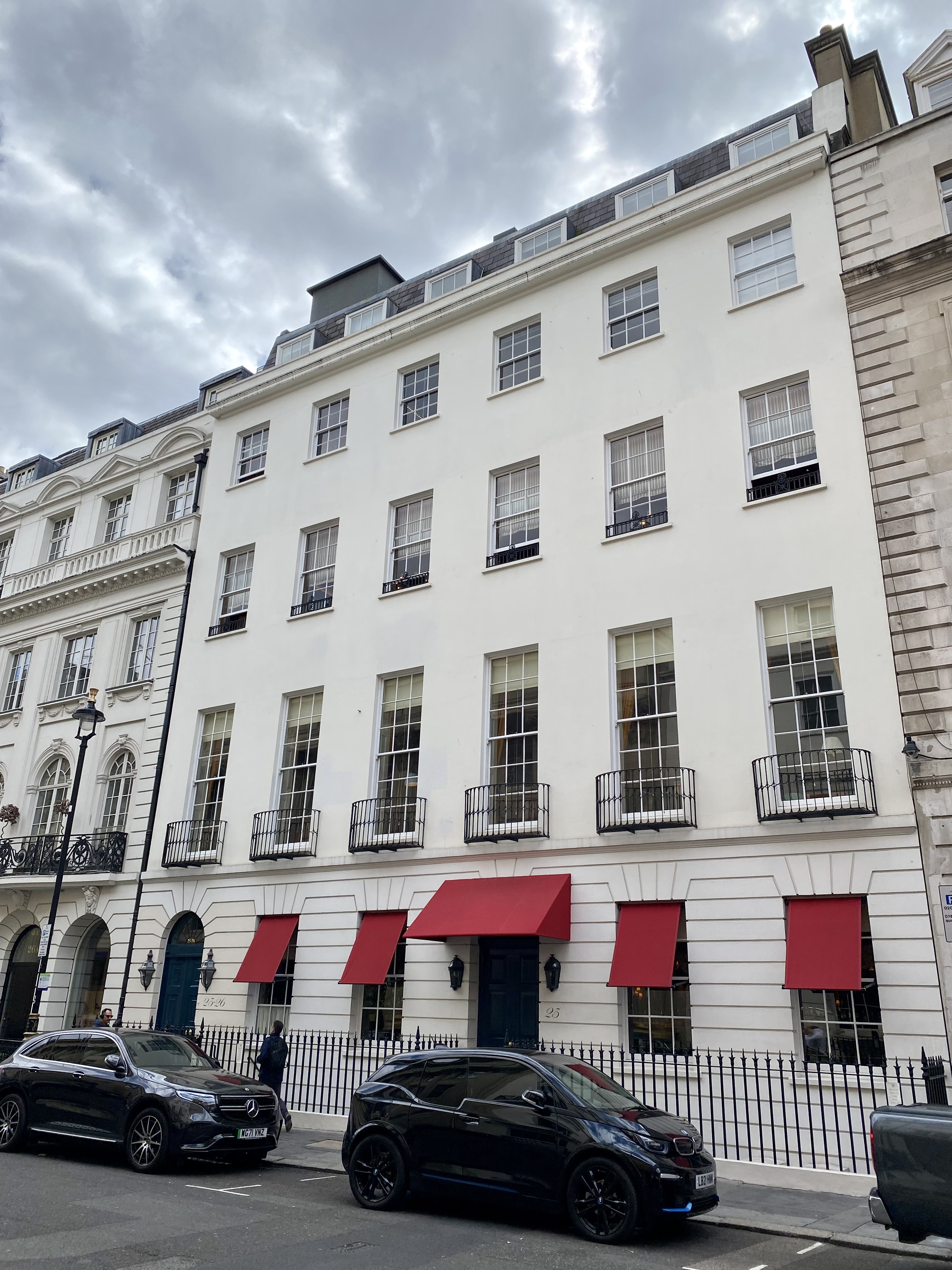
Oswald's in May 2022

Prince William, Duke of Cambridge attended a dinner at the club in November 2021. In January 2022 Prime Minister Boris Johnson and his wife Carrie Johnson spent an evening at the club. In May 2023 Beyoncé shared that she had been to the club with her husband Jay-Z. Other Conservative Party politicians who are regular visitors include Michael Gove, Priti Patel, Liz Truss and Nadhim Zahawi. The actress Amber Heard went to Oswald's with friends in the evening following the second day of the Depp v News Group Newspapers Ltd trial at the High Court. Other members include George Osborne, and Lord Rothermere, and Birley's mother Lady Annabel Goldsmith. The club has a large overlap of members with Birley's other Mayfair club, 5 Hertford Street.

The club held a reception for royal family members and guests on the eve of the Coronation of Charles III and Camilla in May 2023. British royal family members included the Princess Royal; Zara and Mike Tindall; the Duke and Duchess of Edinburgh; their children Lady Louise Mountbatten-Windsor and James, Earl of Wessex; Andrew Mountbatten-Windsor; and Lady Margarita Armstrong-Jones. Foreign royal guests included King Carl XVI Gustaf of Sweden and his daughter, Crown Princess Victoria, Prince Albert II of Monaco and his wife, Princess Charlene, and Queen Anne-Marie of Greece along with her son, Crown Prince Pavlos, and daughter-in-law, Crown Princess Marie-Chantal. The club also hosted the star-studded 50th Birthday celebration of Victoria Beckham on 20 April 2024.
