= Democracy Movement (UK) =

UK pressure group

The Democracy Movement in the UK is a crossparty Eurosceptic pressure group with over 320,000 registered supporters and 160 local branches.

== History ==
The Democracy Movement was founded in 1998 through a merger of the Referendum Movement, a cross-party successor group to Sir James Goldsmith's Referendum Party, and the Euro Information Campaign set up by Yorkshire businessman Paul Sykes.

Sir James's widow, Lady Annabel Goldsmith became its president and Sykes became its chairman until he stepped down in 2000 on re-joining the Conservative Party. Lady Annabel's son, the businessman Robin Birley, took over as the organisation's chairman, serving until 2004.

The Democracy Movement originated from the ideas and 1997 general election campaign of the Referendum Party. At its launch, describing the campaign as an effort "in memory of Jimmy", Lady Annabel said:

I'm not anti-European - my husband was half European and my children are a quarter French. I just don't want to be governed by Brussels, and I don't think people want to give up their sovereignty. Jimmy used to describe it as sitting at the top of the mountain watching a train crash - that was like us heading for the European superstate.

The DM is funded by donations from grassroots supporters, although the Goldsmith family and Paul Sykes made large campaign donations during its early years.

== Policy positions ==
The Democracy Movement campaigns on a number of eurosceptic issues such as opposing Britain entering Economic and Monetary Union or the Eurozone and has also campaigned against the EU Constitution and the Lisbon Treaty.

Its opposition to the euro is on the grounds that the British government would lose economic control over interest rates, exchange rates and spending on public services and also that the public would lose democratic control if such economic decisions were passed to EU institutions. On the EU Constitution the Democracy Movement claimed that far from being a 'tidying up exercise' of existing treaties and powers as the government portrayed, the Constitution represented a fundamental change in the nature of the EU and a significant increase in the centralisation of decision-making power in Brussels. The Movement campaigned for a national referendum on the EU Constitution, which in April 2004 the then Prime Minister Tony Blair conceded. However, following the rejection of the Constitution by similar referendums in France in May 2005 and the Netherlands in June 2005, the UK vote was postponed indefinitely.

In its subsequent Vision Europe campaign, the Democracy Movement called for the dismantling of the EU and its replacement with a new flexible and voluntary form of co-operation between European governments, called the 'Europe of Democracies'. The campaign proposed that powers should be decentralised from Brussels back to elected national parliaments whose laws would resume legal precedence. Trade would be facilitated between countries within Europe and across the world, and an internationalist outlook would be developed. It was also proposed that billions of pounds from the EU budget should be re-distributed to the peoples of Europe.

When the EU Constitution was superseded by the Treaty of Lisbon and the House of Commons European Scrutiny Committee declared the treaty to be "substantially equivalent" to the earlier EU Constitution, the Democracy Movement launched a campaign for the government's pledge of a referendum to be honoured. The Movement set up a ReferendumList website, listing MPs' views on a referendum and launched a leafleting campaign in more than 130 marginal constituencies of anti-referendum MPs. The leaflets were personalised to the sitting MP in each seat and accused them of taking the public for "fools" in claiming that the Lisbon Treaty was sufficiently different to the EU Constitution that the referendum was no longer justified. In March 2008, MPs voted against a referendum on the Lisbon Treaty by a narrow margin of 63 votes. Thirteen Liberal Democrat MPs rebelled against the party's orders to abstain on the referendum vote, with three party spokesmen resigning their posts, and 29 Labour MPs also rebelled against their government's opposition to a referendum.

In October 2008 the Democracy Movement was invited to conduct the 'No' campaign in a mini-referendum on the Lisbon Treaty and on EU membership held in the town of Luton, organised and later televised by the ITV Tonight programme. During the campaign the Movement highlighted the net cost of EU membership, argued that the EU had a role in local post office closures and said that the Lisbon Treaty would centralise even more important decisions in unelected Brussels institutions. A leaflet entitled Break Free from the outdated EU was distributed, setting out what the DM called a "better way" of trade and co-operation between European countries being perfectly possible without having to pass ever more decisions to remote EU institutions. The Democracy Movement won the referendum, with 63 per cent of respondents voting against the Lisbon Treaty and 27 per cent for it, while 54 per cent voted against EU membership and 35 per cent in favour.

In 2011 the Democracy Movement continued its drive for an EU referendum as a founding supporter of the cross-party People's Pledge campaign for an in-out referendum on Britain's membership of the EU. A referendum took place on 23 June 2016, with almost 52% of those who voted, voting to leave the EU.

== Activism ==
The Democracy Movement played the major grassroots role in the campaign to 'keep the pound', from launch quickly establishing a large crossparty network of supporters and branches ready to campaign against euro membership in the referendum that was then promised. Its then chairman Paul Sykes pledged to spend £20 million on the campaign and the Movement claimed to be distributing "millions" of pro-pound leaflets through a series of 'Democracy Days' of national, concerted action by its branches.

On 12 January 2001, the DM launched an advertising and leafleting campaign, worth around £500,000, to expose the parliamentary votes of pro-Brussels candidates before the May general elections. The organisation published two million pamphlets that carried provocative headlines about the 'horrors of a European state' and published full page local newspaper advertisements in the constituencies of politicians in 120 "target" seats. Reflecting the dominant Labour government of the time, these included 70 Labour MPs, 35 Liberal Democrats, six Conservatives and three Scottish National Party candidates.

The Movement's 2008 campaign for a referendum on the Lisbon Treaty asked supporters to write to their MPs and submit the responses they received to a "ReferendumList" website, highlighting MPs' views. Further aiming to 'name and shame' anti-referendum MPs, this was accompanied by a leafleting campaign involving the distribution of 10,000 leaflets in each of more than 130 marginal constituencies where the MP opposed an EU referendum.

The DM has published a quarterly magazine, These Tides, in support of eurosceptic pressure groups across the continent. Its stated aim is to "keep the international family of activists working for the post-EU Europe". Contributors have included Norman Tebbit, Tony Benn, Gisela Stuart and John Redwood.

== See also ==
- Business for Britain
- Campaign for an Independent Britain
- Conservatives for Britain
- Democratic Party (UK, 1998)
- Euroscepticism in the United Kingdom
- Grassroots Out (GO)
- Labour Leave
- Leave Means Leave
- Leave.EU
- Referendum Party
- Vote Leave
