= Harry's Bar (London) =

Restaurant in London, England

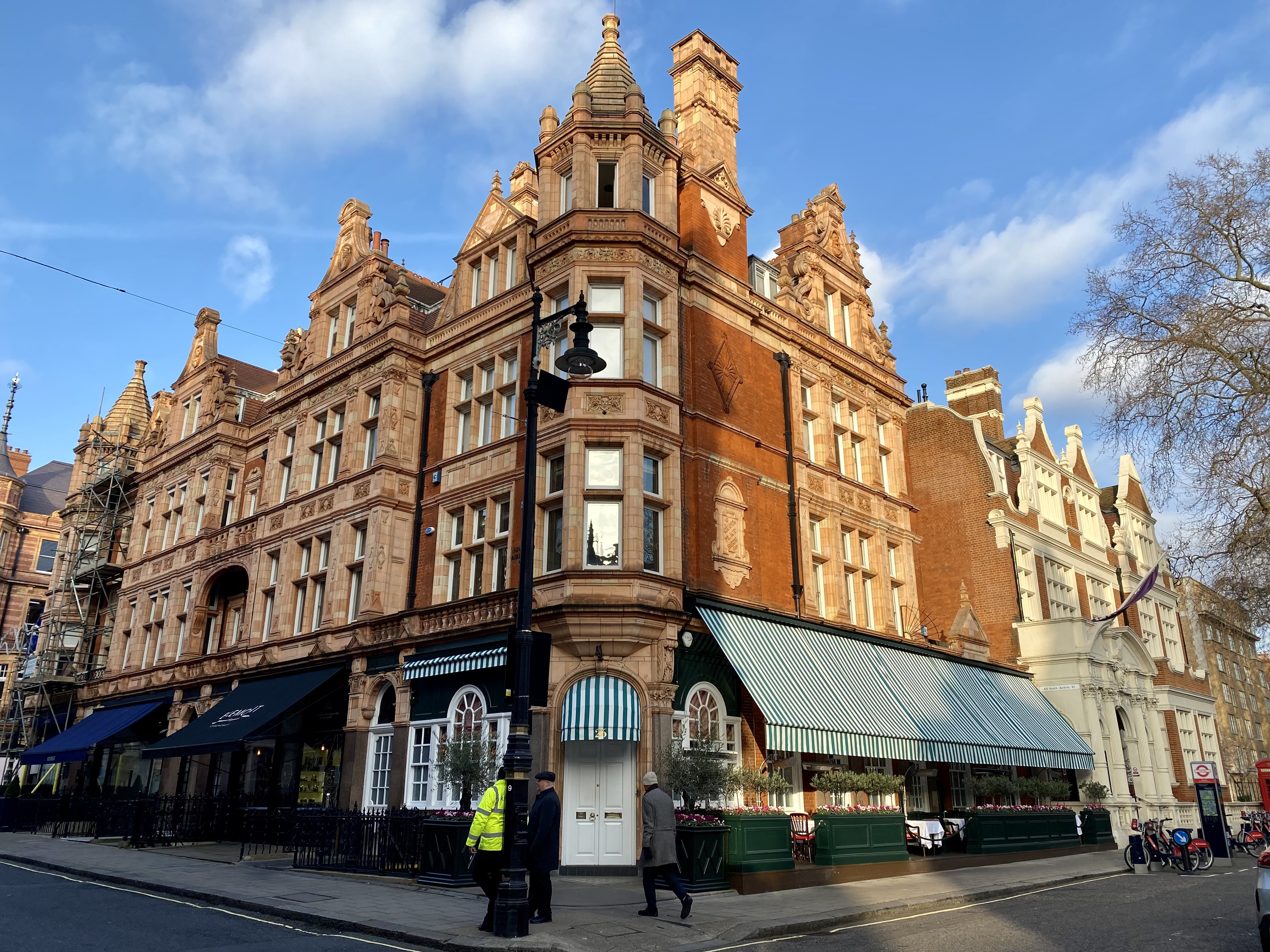
- Harry's Bar in January 2022
- Interactive map of Harry's Bar

Restaurant information
- Established: 1979; 47 years ago
- Owner: Richard Caring
- Food type: Italian cuisine
- Dress code: Smart
- Location: 26 South Audley Street, Mayfair, London, W1K 2PD, United Kingdom
- Coordinates: 51.5093°N 0.1514°W
- Website: www.harrysbar.co.uk

Harry's Bar is a private members' dining club at 26 South Audley Street in London's Mayfair district.

It was established by Mark Birley in 1979 with the American businessman James Sherwood as his silent partner. Birley and Sherwood subsequently had a dispute after Birley left the management of the club to his own two children. Birley sold the club to Richard Caring in 2007, along with his four other Mayfair clubs: Annabel's, Mark's Club, George, and the Bath & Racquets Club.

Harry's Bar is renowned for its Italian cuisine. Two unaffiliated branches of Harry's Bar, also owned by Richard Caring, opened in the 2010s: on Basil Street in Knightsbridge in 2017, and on James Street in Marylebone in 2018.

== Origins ==
Harry's Bar is located at 26 South Audley Street in London's Mayfair district. The site had been previously occupied by the wine merchants Block, Grey & Block. The club was established by Mark Birley in 1979 and named for the famed bar of the same name in Venice founded by Giuseppe Cipriani. Birley's silent partner in Harry's Bar was the American businessman James Sherwood who owned 49% to Birley's 51%. Sherwood invested $575,000 to establish Harry's Bar through his Orient-Express Hotels company. Birley and Sherwood's original agreement included a clause that stated that the other would have the right to buy out his partner's shares should either of them cease to act individually. The clause led to a dispute between Birley and Sherwood after Birley's children, India Jane and Robin Birley, assumed the management of his clubs due to Birley's ill-health. Birley wrote an open letter to members stating that he had been unwell and had " ... tried in vain for nearly a year now to persuade him [Sherwood] that Harry's Bar can only work as a family run business and not as part of a large publicly-quoted hotel group ...As a family we can't agree to his terms which involve short term performance targets that would trigger a buy-out by Orient-Express Limited in the event we fail to meet them. As you know I don't run my business like that and as my children have been brought up in the clubs they understand that we take a long term view". Robin Birley said that "Harry's Bar is about spending $80,000 per annum on flowers; it's about perfectionism. We wouldn't start doing catering or opening on weekends or turning tables to make ends meet. That completely goes against the ethos of what we do". In 2004 Harry's Bar made a profit of $1.8 million. Sherwood wrote to Mark Birley in March 2005 that he did not have the same freedom that Birley enjoyed as he was the head of a public company and also said that he had never asked Birley to restrain his spending on the restaurant. The Birley family bought the 51% stake of Orient-Express Hotels in Harry's Bar for £5.1 million in 2006.

== Ambience ==
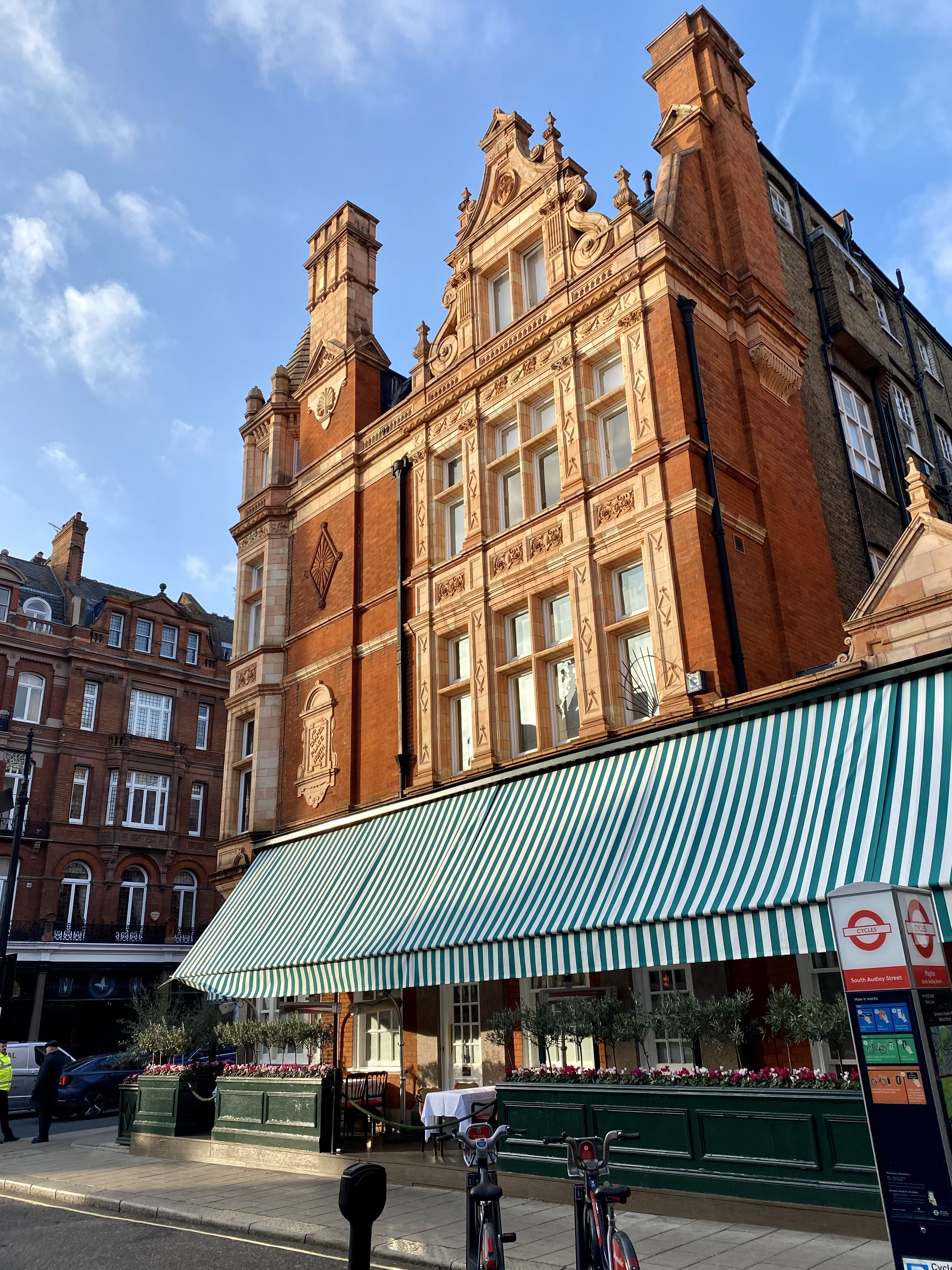
Harry's Bar from another angle

Birley said of Harry's Bar that he tried to create the warmth and informality of the Venetian Harry's Bar. The head chef upon opening was Alberico Penati, with the menu centred around the Milan region of Italy. The decor of the club was designed by Nina Campbell. Cartoons from The New Yorker by Peter Arno are prominently displayed among fabrics by Mariano Fortuny.

The club was intended to be more receptive to women diners than Birley's Mark's Club. Lawrence Goldman wrote of the club in Birley's entry in the Oxford Dictionary of National Biography that "For thin ladies who lunched, as well as American visitors and devotees of Italian cuisine, the food and ambience were sublime. Prices were exorbitant: at one time Harry's Bar was the highest grossing restaurant per square foot in the world. Birley considered it to be his apogee".

== Membership ==
The membership of Harry's Bar was described in The New York Times shortly after opening in 1979 as consisting of a "dollop of the titled...and some of the top businessmen around town". By 1990 Emma Soames felt that the clientele of the restaurant was "classy" and "resembles the departure lounge for Concorde", spotted Lew Grade, David Frost and Terry Wogan at lunch there on her visit, and listed Lord Hanson, Alan Sugar and Gordon White as regular guests. The cost of membership was £600 a year in 1990 (equivalent to £1,484 in 2025). In his 1988 book The Fashion Conspiracy, Nicholas Coleridge described Harry's Bar as the perfect place to "watch designer clothes in action" with Harry's Bar being a "national park for designer labels, with Valentino's, Ungaro's, Armani's and Saint Laurent's roaming at will in their natural habitat".

In 1998, Jonathan Meades described the members of Harry's Bar as being " ... industrialists, diplomats, kings, American widows with an appetite for what the French euphemise as aesthetic surgery, film stars of the old school, dandiacal plutocrats, Mayfair smoothies and the gastronomically earnest" and noted that "Members and staff know each other, are mutually respectful and on amiable terms – there is no doubt a trace of feudalism in all this but it works to the benefit of both sides". In 1989 Claire Frankel summed up the clientele as being "classy international yuppie".

Prince Rupert Loewenstein persuaded Birley to allow the American singer Terence Trent D'Arby to lunch with him at Harry's Bar shortly after the launch of D'Arby's debut album in 1987. Birley quipped to Loewenstein that D'Arby had a "fine English aristocratic surname". The painter Lucian Freud dined with the performance artist Leigh Bowery at Harry's Bar in late 1980s. Bowery arrived without the customary jacket and tie demanded by the dress code of the restaurant, so Freud lent him a grey scarf and Bowery borrowed a jacket from a waiter.

In 2008, banker Bob Diamond hosted a $25,000-per-head fundraising event for 60 guests at Harry's Bar organised by Frances Prenn which raised $2 million for John McCain's American presidential campaign. Guests included Cindy McCain, Henry Kissinger, Louis Bacon, and Russ Gercon.

A Harry's Bar cookbook was published in 2005 by Harley Publishing, with a foreword by Mark Birley and essays by Frederick Forsyth and Nicholas Lander.

== Reviews and opinions ==
Harry's Bar is renowned for its Italian cuisine. In 1990 Emma Soames described Harry's Bar in The Times as the "king of the High Urban school in London" contrasting its "High Urban" Italian cuisine with the newer "Tuscan Farmhouse" style as exemplified by the recently opened River Café. Soames wrote that the food was "Unmistakably Italian and mostly classical, it is almost impossible to find fault with any of it (until you come to the bill)". The bill for "lunch with one bottle of wine and two glasses of pudding wine" for Soames and her guest came to £145 in 1990 (equivalent to £359 in 2025).

Jonathan Meades reviewed Harry's Bar in 1998 in The Times and praised its "unflashy opulence, discretion, nothing overlooked, obsessive attention to detail" that served "some of the most exquisite cooking in London". Meades felt that Harry's Bar was "...somewhere which is wittingly outside time, place and fashion (in so far as that's ever possible). It certainly goes by its own rules, it's hermetically swaddling, an autonomous cocoon".

Harry's Bar has attracted praise from the Italian fashion designers Giorgio Armani and Valentino Garavani, though Frankie Dettori said that the meal was the most expensive he had ever had in London at £1200 for four people.

== Sexual harassment allegations ==
The head chef of Harry's Bar, Alberico Penati, subjected a waitress to several months of aggressive sexual harassment while she worked there. She was subsequently awarded £124,000 by an employment tribunal for unfair dismissal and sexual discrimination. Penati remained as executive chef following the tribunal. Penati would walk around the kitchen dressed in his underpants while making sexual remarks about women and would tell the waitress that he never surrendered "until I see the blood of my victim" and that she would have to be punished for rejecting him. The chairman of the tribunal, Gordon Etherington, said that Penati had a "grossly inflated sense of his own importance" and had a "bullying and arrogant" approach to staff. Penati left Harry's Bar after it was bought by Richard Caring in 2007, stating that he preferred to "work for a family-run business not a corporation". He subsequently joined Aspinall's on Curzon Street, opening the restaurant Alberico at Aspinall's.

== Sale and recent history ==
In 2007 Birley sold his four Mayfair clubs, including Harry's Bar, to Richard Caring for £90 million. The club is now part of the Birley Clubs owned by Caring, including Annabel's, Mark's Club, George, and the Bath & Racquets Club.

An unaffiliated restaurant - also owned by Caring- heavily inspired by Harry's Bar, Harry's Dolce Vita, opened on Basil Street in Knightsbridge in December 2017. With another branch of the unrelated Harry's Bar Restaurant opening on James Street in Marylebone in October 2018.

Harry's Bar celebrated its 40th birthday with a party in October 2021.
