= India Jane Birley =

British artist

- Born: 14 January 1961 (age 65); London, England
- Spouses: Jonty Colchester (m. 1980; div. 1985) Francis Pike (m. 1993; div. 2006) Sebastian Whitestone (m. 2008)
- Children: 1
- Parents: Mark Birley; Lady Annabel Birley
- Relatives: Rupert Birley (brother, deceased), Robin Birley (brother), Zac Goldsmith (half-brother), Jemima Goldsmith (half-sister), and Ben Goldsmith (half-brother)

India Jane Birley (born 14 January 1961) is a British artist and businesswoman. Her father, Mark Birley, opened the private member's club Annabel's, named after her mother, Lady Annabel Goldsmith, in the early 1960s and Birley ran the club with her brother, Robin Birley, during her father's ill health in the 2000s. She later became estranged from her brother, and her father's estate was left to her to be placed in trust for her son.

Birley is an established portrait artist and has illustrated her mother's books. In 2011 she bought Charleston Manor, the Sussex estate of her paternal grandfather, the portrait artist Oswald Birley.

== Biography ==
=== Early life ===
Birley was born in 1961 in London, England, the daughter of Lady Annabel Vane-Tempest-Stewart and Mark Birley. Her paternal grandfather was the society and royal portrait painter Oswald Birley. She has two brothers, Rupert (presumed deceased) and Robin; and three half-siblings, Zac, Jemima, and Ben Goldsmith, from her mother's relationship with James Goldsmith, Lady Annabel's second husband.

Birley described her father as "not very affectionate" and "not the easiest of people" and that he only came to respect her after she cared for him during the illness of his last years. She felt her father recognised that she could run a house " ... full of my own style, which he liked. From then on he had a new respect for me. He liked people who could make him laugh — I think I could make him laugh". As a child she resorted to eating Winalot dog food in an attempt to win her father's affections; in a 2013 interview she said that her father's many dogs " ... received masses of love and affection. (Ours) was never an active jealousy, because we loved the dogs too. We knew the pecking order". As a child she once gave up her bedroom to provide more space for her father's boots and shoes. Birley described her father as "formidable" saying that he could " ... scowl and smile at the same time. For a child it's a very, very odd feeling. With an adult it's bliss, because you can figure out the subtlety, but with a child it's terrifying".

As a child she witnessed a tiger attack her brother Robin at the private zoo of John Aspinall. The attack left him with severe injuries and facial disfigurement. Her elder brother Rupert disappeared while swimming off the coast of Togo in 1986. Birley was aged 24 at the time of her brother's disappearance and said that "It changed everything forever ... I don't think any of us will ever get over it".

=== Annabel's ===
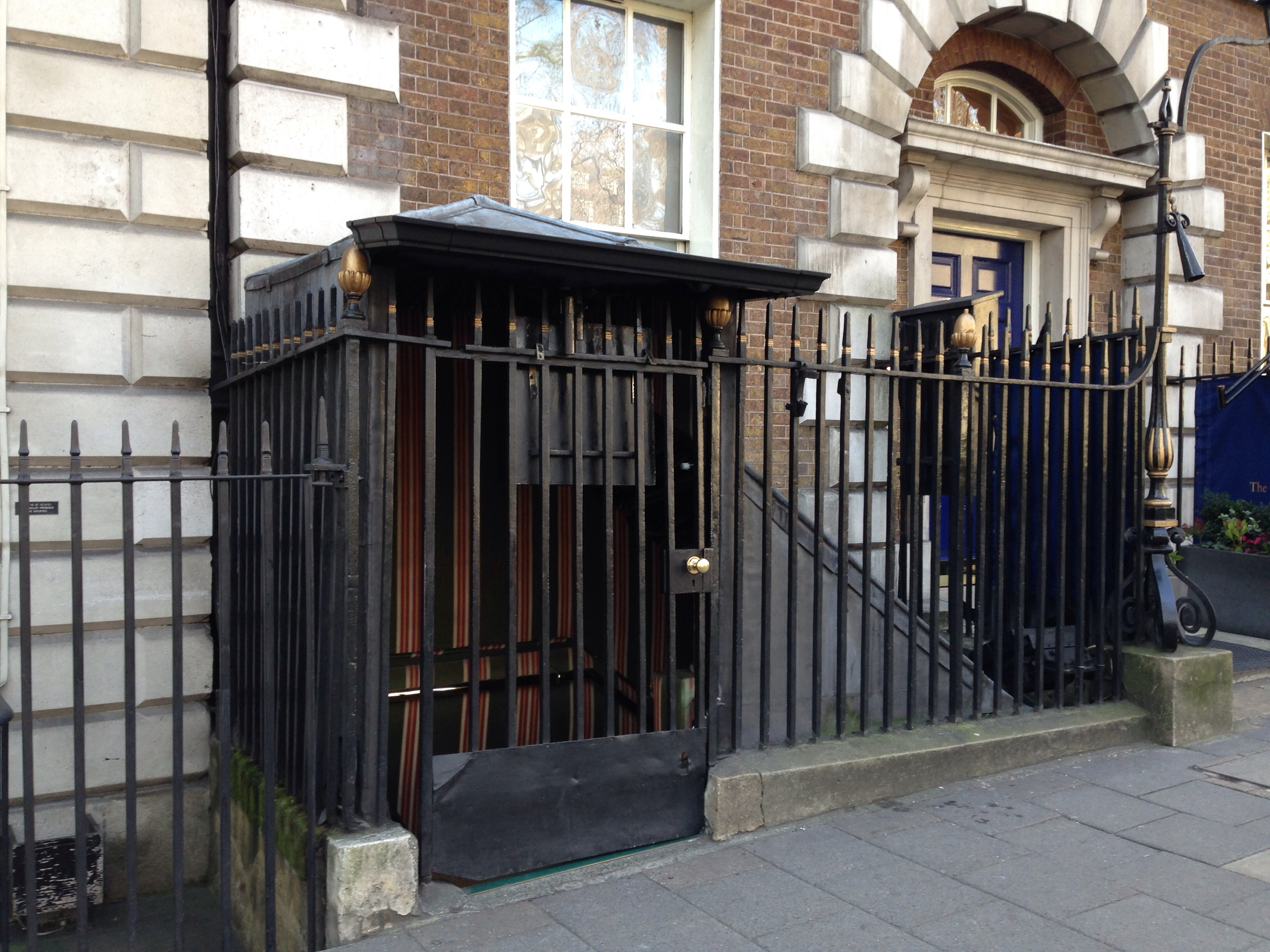
The entrance to Annabel's nightclub in 2015

Her father established the nightclub Annabel's in 1963 in Berkeley Square in London's Mayfair district. It was named for her mother. He subsequently opened the private members clubs Mark's Club in 1972, Harry's Bar, in 1979, the Bath & Racquets Club in 1989, and George in 2001. George was established by Robin and India Jane, who ran their father's clubs during his ill health.

Mark Birley suffered a decline in his health and mobility in the late 1990s and early 2000s and invited India Jane and Robin to help him run his clubs for the first time. Birley co-managed Annabel's with her brother, Robin in the years before her father's death. Robin Birley said in email to Maureen Orth that "My sister and I got on very well and worked well together ... Basically, I ran the company, and she attended to the look of the clubs". India Jane redesigned and relaunched Annabel's with Robin in 2003. The club had been perceived as old fashioned, with its heyday in the 1970s and 1980s, but her changes led to the arrival of a younger crowd to the club and the revival of its popularity. Birley solely managed Annabel's in 2006 after her estrangement from her brother. Birley left the management of her father's clubs after their sale to Richard Caring in 2007.

=== Estrangement from brother and death of father ===
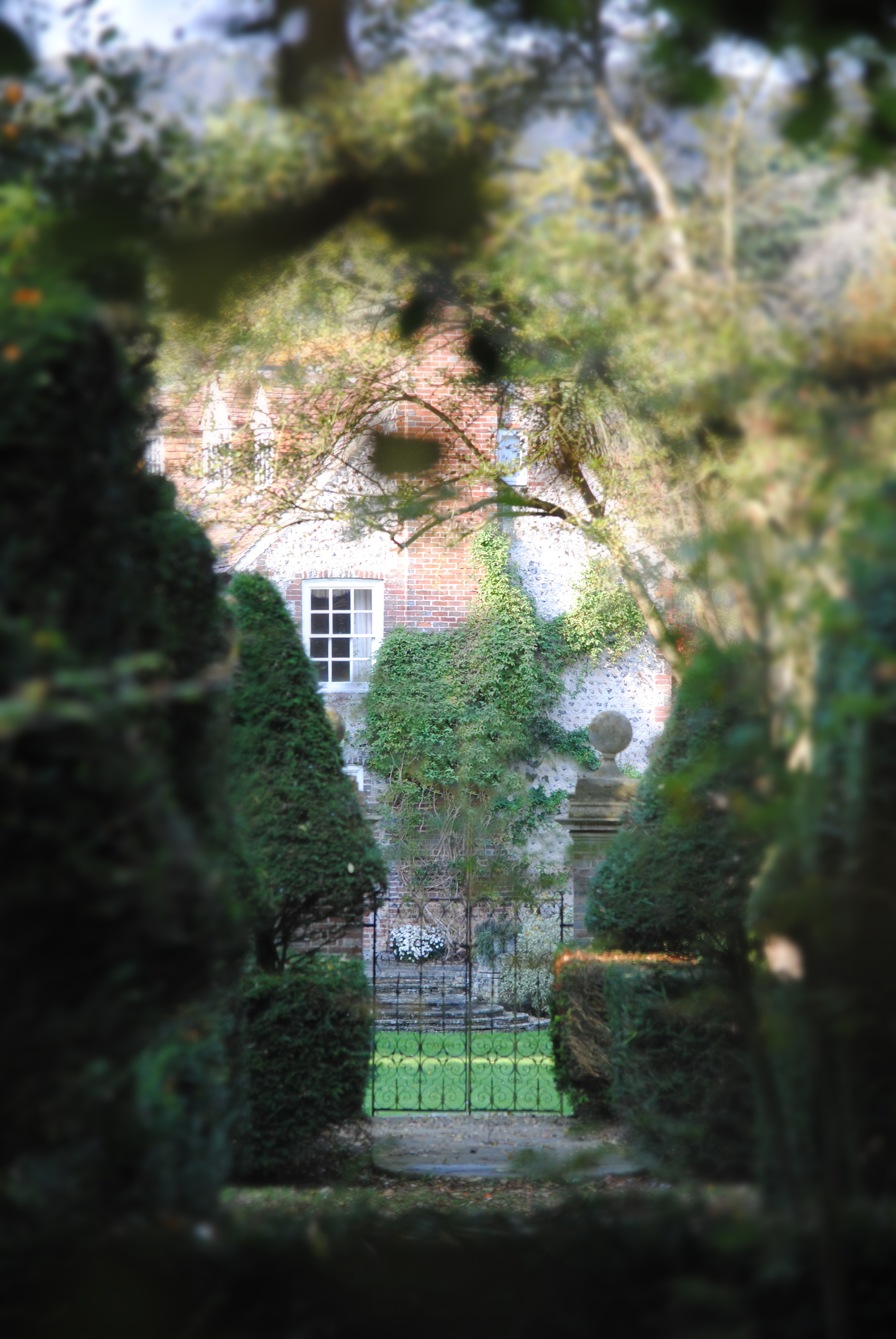
Charleston Manor, which was bought by Birley in 2011

Birley became pregnant in 2004 and her brother Robin paid former London police officers who claimed to be private detectives more than £400,000 from the accounts of Annabel's in exchange for false information about her then partner, and the father of her child, Robert Macdonald. The investigation was to establish whether Macdonald had a financial motive behind his relationship with India Jane. Mark Birley fell out with Robin following the revelation. Mark Birley sacked Robin from the management of his clubs after the fall out from the affair.

The investigators hired by Robin met India Jane in 2006 and alleged that they had information about her. India Jane described the meeting as " ... highly improbable, unreal, and very, very unpleasant ... It was very sinister. These people were thugs". She hired her own detective who informed her that Robin was behind the investigation which she described as " ... very cruel. The intent was to ruin Robert Macdonald. I would then seem to be influenced by a famous financial fraudster". The investigators hired by Robin gave him tapes of women claiming to be former lovers of Macdonald, the women were in fact drama students. India Jane described the tapes as "crackly and fuzzy and said that she "[couldn't] imagine anyone being taken in by that crap". Robin subsequently said that he felt he was "acting in the best interest of my sister ... My father was too ill at the time to have any additional worries". Macdonald later received an official apology from Robin and had all his legal bills paid with an additional cash settlement. Robin apologised to his sister and admitted that he had been mistaken in pursuing the investigation.

Mark Birley sold his clubs to the entrepreneur Richard Caring for £95 million shortly before his death in 2007. Birley became estranged from her brother Robin following their dispute over their father's will. Upon his death in 2007, Mark Birley left the majority of his estate — valued at £120 million — and his possessions to India Jane to be kept in trust for her son, Eben, in his will. Birley wrote a letter to India Jane explaining his reasoning behind his will. The letter said that he had sold his clubs to protect them from his son, Robin. A previous will had divided his estate equally between India Jane and Robin, with India Jane additionally receiving her father's house and possessions. The will was challenged by Robin Birley; he initially received two bequests free of tax for £1 million and £5 million. This was subsequently increased to £35 million following an out-of-court settlement.

Birley held an auction at Sotheby's of 500 items from her father's estate in March 2013. Robin Birley said that he was 'appalled' at her decision to sell their fathers things. Birley said that the auction was a difficult decision but that she "[would] like to think [my father] approves of the sale, for being an artist he understands my need to carve out my own space". The auction raised £3.85 million. Birley only became wealthy after her father died, as he had believed that they would be lazy had they inherited money at a young age. Birley said between her three marriages she survived by selling paintings and never took holidays or had nice clothes. Birley kept her father's ashes on a drinks tray next to some whisky saying that he would have been very happy there.

Birley sold Thurloe Lodge, her father's house in South Kensington, for £17 million in 2011. In 2011 Birley bought Charleston Manor in East Sussex. Charleston Manor was the estate of her paternal grandfather, the painter Sir Oswald Birley. Birley owns a large estate near Marrakech that her father had planned to develop shortly before his death.

== Art ==
Birley has painted since her youth, and attended several art schools. She hosted an exhibition of her paintings, "Canines and Companions" at her father's club George shortly before its opening in 2001. Birley illustrated her mother's 2009 book, Copper: A Dog's Life. Her portrait of the businessman and writer Conrad Black and his wife, the writer Barbara Amiel, is in the collection of the National Portrait Gallery in London. In 2001, The Economist described Birley as a "modern portrait painter, in pursuit of honesty" who depicted Black and Amiel in her portrait as a "gangster and his moll". Birley accompanied Charles, Prince of Wales on his 1996 trip to Bangladesh as his official artist.

Birley and Janey Longman were depicted in Lucian Freud's 1992 painting Two Women. Freud's biographer William Feaver described Two Women as an "intriguing classical two hander" with "the two Janes lying there, playing indolent, arms and legs lolling and extending beyond the confines of the bed".

== Personal life ==
In 1980, while training at an art school in Madrid, she met and married Jonty Colchester, an interior designer. The couple divorced in 1985. Birley married the banker and property developer Francis Pike at Chelsea Registry Office in 1993. Birley and Pike lived in Mumbai for four years. The couple separated in 2002 and divorced in 2006. During her separation from Pike, Birley met a Canadian voice coach Robert Macdonald. Their relationship resulted in the birth of a son, Eben. Birley divorced Francis Pike in 2006 and married the antiquarian horologist Sebastian Whitestone in 2008 at Thurloe Lodge, the home of her late father.
