= Oswald Birley =

English portrait painter (1880–1952)

Sir Oswald Birley MC RA ROI
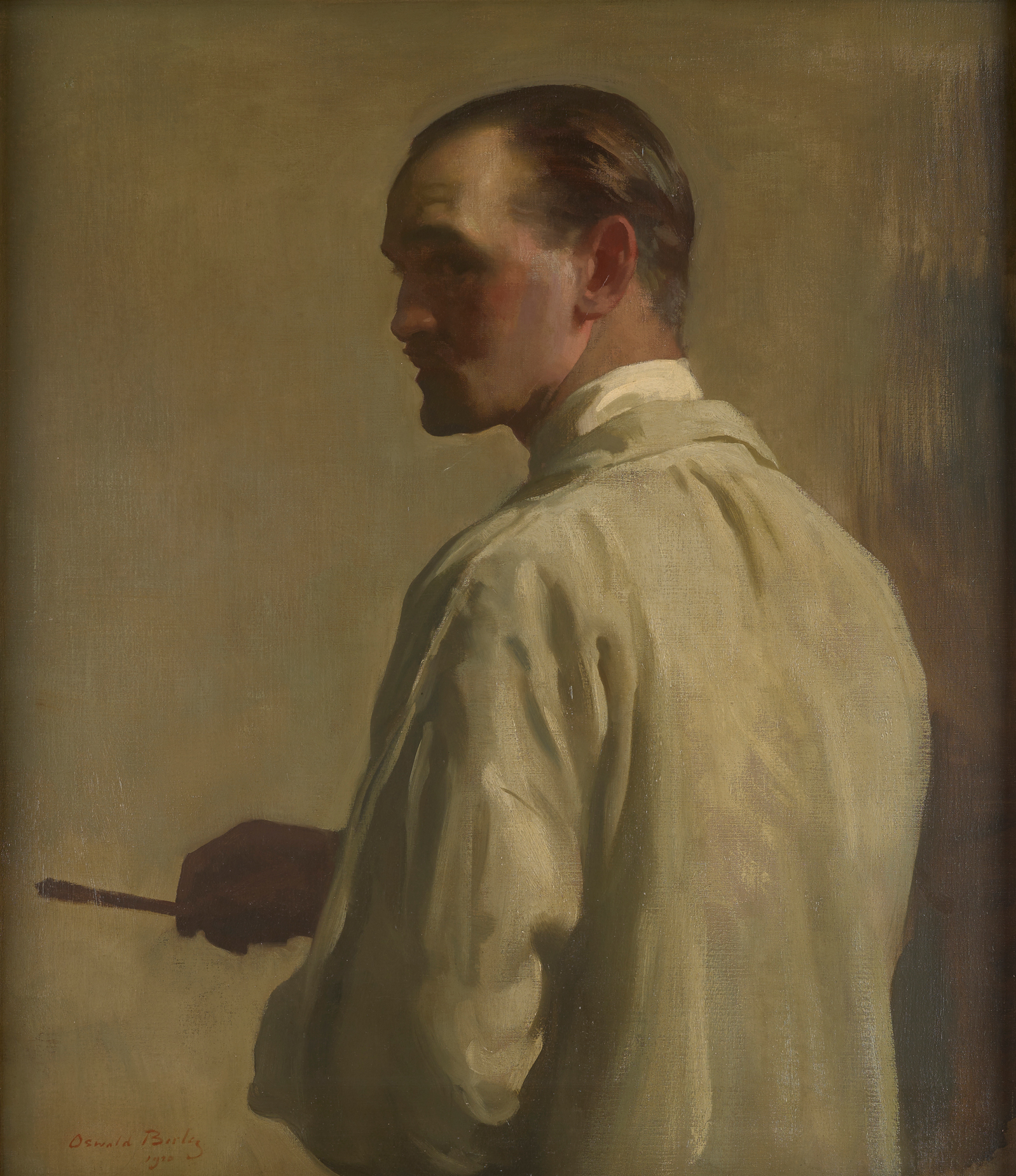
- Self-portrait, 1920

Personal details
- Born: Oswald Hornby Joseph Birley; 31 March 1880 Auckland, New Zealand
- Died: 6 May 1952 (aged 72) St John's Wood, London, England
- Spouse: Rhoda Vava Mary Lecky Pike (m. 1921)
- Children: Maxime Birley; Mark Birley
- Education: Harrow School
- Alma mater: Trinity College
- Known for: Royal portraitist

Sir Oswald Hornby Joseph Birley MC RA ROI (31 March 1880 – 6 May 1952) was an English portrait painter and royal portraitist in the early part of the 20th century.

== Early life and family ==
Birley was born in New Zealand to Hugh Francis Birley (1855–1916) while his parents were on a world tour. He was born into an old Lancashire family. Upon returning to England, he was educated at Harrow School, London and Trinity College, Cambridge.

He was the great-grandson of Hugh Hornby Birley (1778–1845), who led the troops at the Peterloo massacre.

== Career ==
=== Military service ===
Birley served in France in World War I, first with the Royal Fusiliers, where in April 1915 he gained the temporary rank of lieutenant, later transferring to the Intelligence Corps, obtaining the rank of captain and being awarded the Military Cross in 1918.

During World War II he served with the rank of major in the Home Guard.

In October 1942 he lost an eye in an accident with a burst bombard mortar, but said it did not affect his painting.

=== Painting career ===
A favourite of the Royal Family, Birley was well known for his portraits of King George V, Queen Mary, King George VI, Queen Elizabeth, the Queen Mother and Queen Elizabeth II.

He painted several highly regarded portraits of Sir Winston Churchill (to whom he also gave lessons), and also a life-size portrait of Mahatma Gandhi which was the first to be hung in the Lok Sabha shortly after Indian Independence on 28 August 1947.

Other subjects were many war-time leaders such as Generals Eisenhower and Montgomery, as well as Admiral Mountbatten, Air Marshal Trenchard and Field Marshal Alanbrooke. He also painted the wealthy American financiers Andrew Mellon, Bernard Baruch and J. P. Morgan, the psychiatrist Sir James Crichton-Browne, Welsh architect Sir Clough Williams-Ellis and art historian Sir Robert Witt, co-founder of the Courtauld Institute of Art. Birley painted the portrait of Leeds Lord Mayor Sir Charles Lupton (1855–1935).

Birley was knighted in 1949.

A major retrospective exhibition of Birley's work was held at the Philip Mould & Company gallery on Pall Mall in 2007.

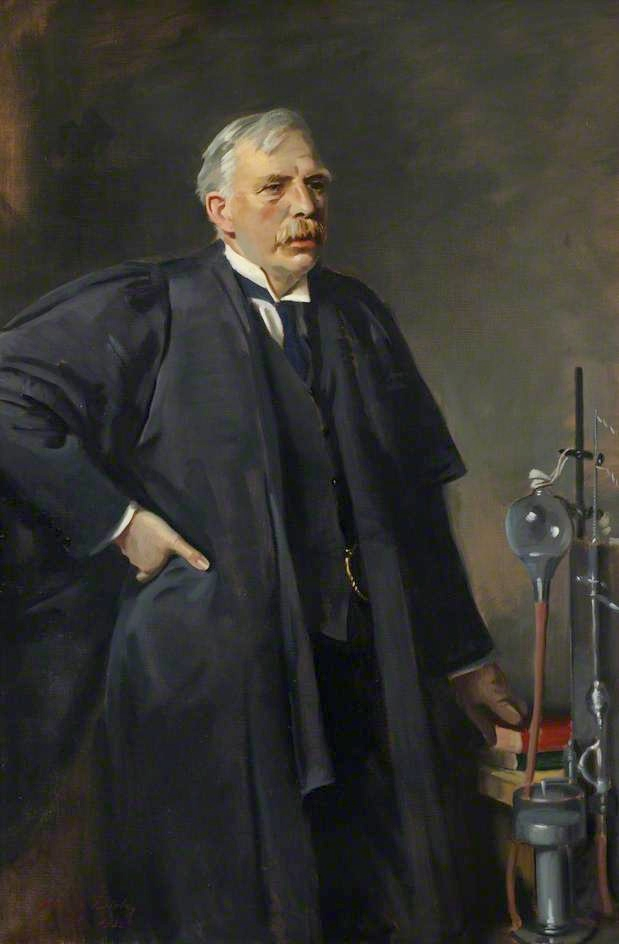
Portrait of Ernest Rutherford by Birley (1936)

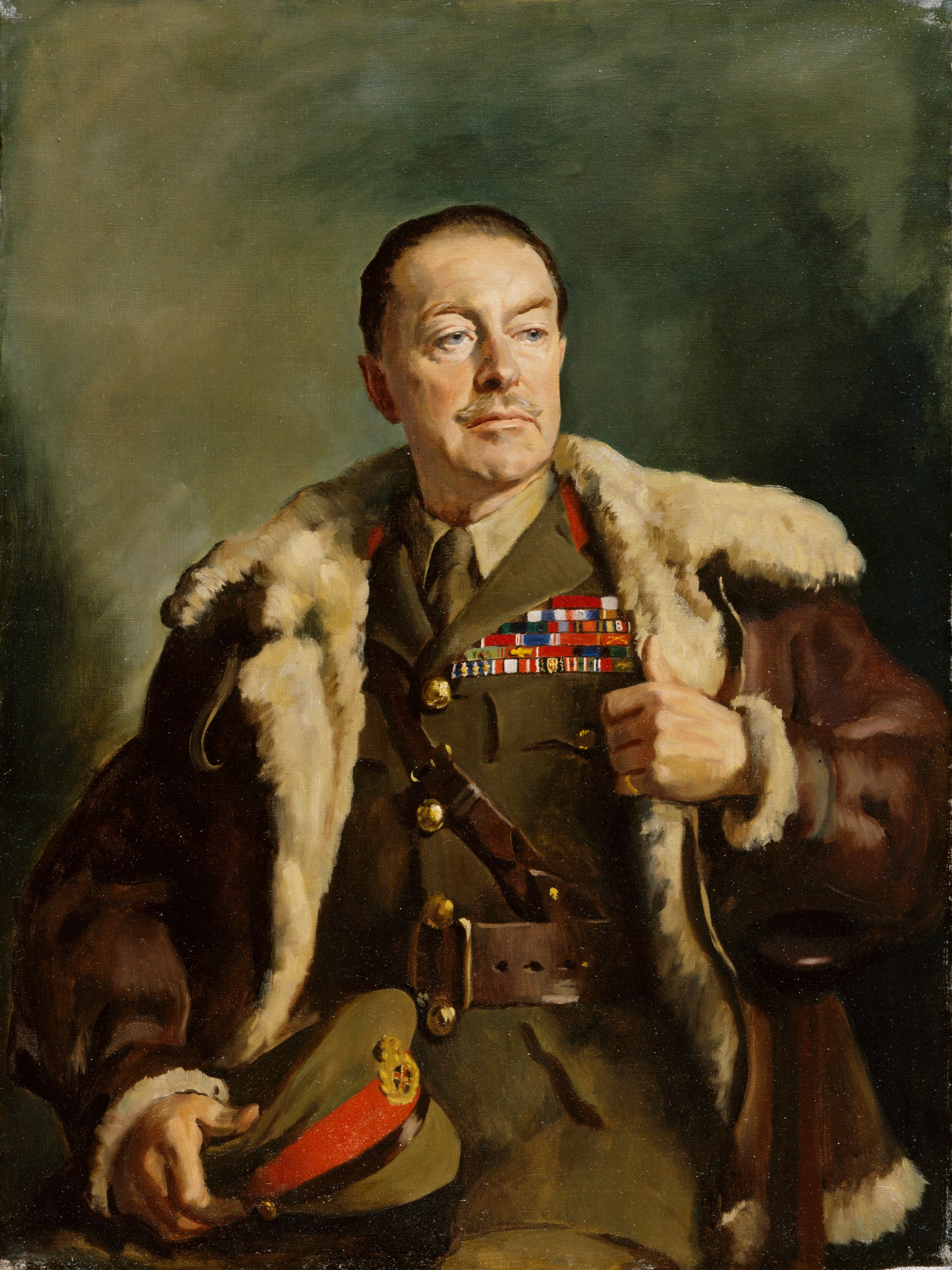
Portrait of Harold Alexander by Birley (1945)

== Personal life ==
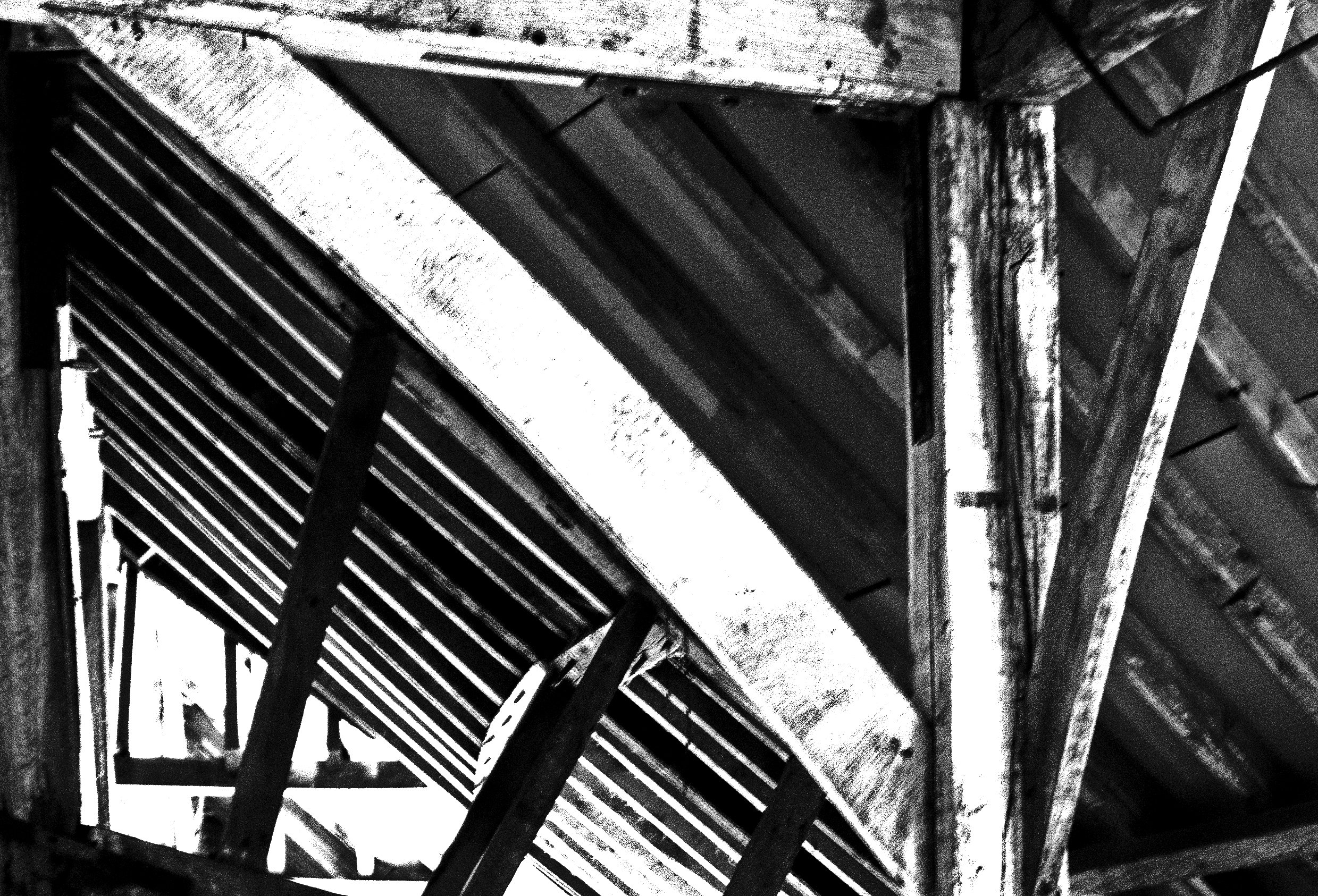
Charleston Manor roof trusses by Charlie Verrall

In 1921, the 41-year-old Birley married the 21-year-old "Irish beauty" Rhoda Vava Mary Lecky Pike (1900–1981). They bought and refurbished Charleston Manor in East Sussex. Rhoda later founded the Charleston Manor Festival there. The couple had two children:

- Maxime Birley (1922–2009), a model and actress who married Count Alain Le Bailly de La Falaise (1905–1977) They divorced in 1950, following a series of her infidelities, including an affair with British ambassador Duff Cooper (1890–1954). She later married John McKendry, the curator of prints and photographs at the Metropolitan Museum of Art.
- Mark Birley (1930–2007), an entrepreneur and founder of Annabel's in London, who married Lady Annabel Vane-Tempest-Stewart (born 1934). They divorced in 1975 after her affair with Birley's friend Sir James Goldsmith (1933–1997).

Birley died at his home in London on 6 May 1952, a week after returning from six-week trip to the United States where he received medical assistance.

=== Descendants ===
Birley's descendants include Robin Birley (born 1958), who married Lucy Ferry (1960–2018), and India Jane Birley (born 1961). Other descendants include the fashion designer and muse Loulou de la Falaise (1948–2011), who was married to Desmond FitzGerald, 29th Knight of Glin (1937–2011), and later to Thadée Klossowski de Rola, a French writer who is the younger son of the painter Balthus (1908–2001). Loulou de la Falaise's niece is the fashion model Lucie de la Falaise (born 1973).
