= Thurloe Lodge =

General information
- Location: 17 Thurloe Place, London, United Kingdom
- Coordinates: 51.49569°N 0.17068°W
- Completed: 1843

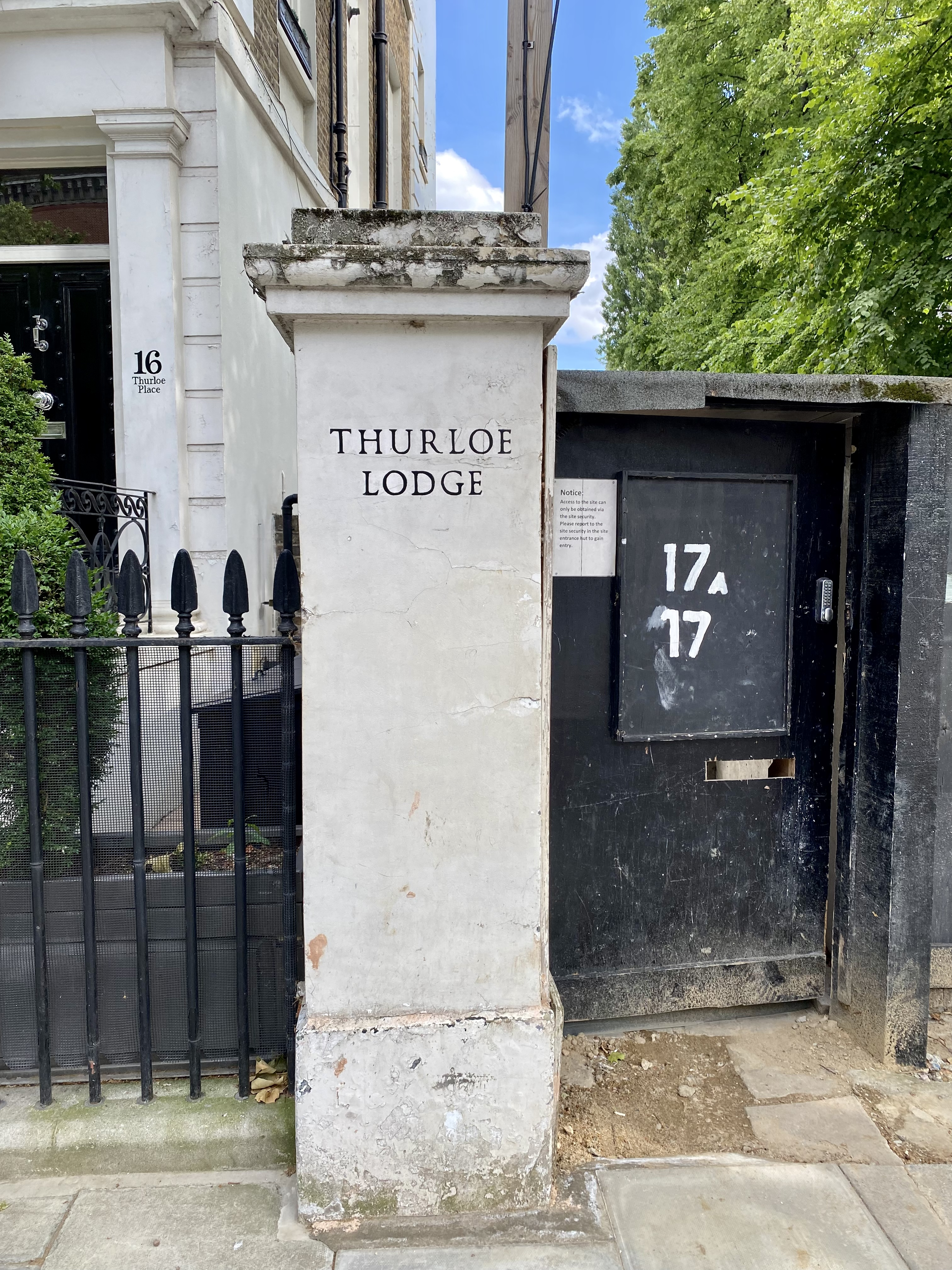
The gate pier of Thurloe Lodge in July 2023

Thurloe Lodge is a house at 17 Thurloe Place in the South Kensington district of London. It was the home of the actor manager Nigel Playfair and was subsequently the home of Mark Birley who founded Annabel's nightclub in Berkeley Square. Birley's daughter, India Jane Birley, sold Thurloe Lodge in 2011 for £17 million.

== History ==
The house began as a pair of semi-detached cottages built in 1843. The area in which the house stands was then considered to be Brompton. They were converted into a single residence in 1867. In 1922 the actor-manager Nigel Playfair bought the house on a long lease from Lady George Campbell who had inherited the Thurloe Estate. Playfair and his family had previously lived at 26 Pelham Crescent. He bought the cottages with the proceeds from his successful revival of The Beggar's Opera at the Lyric Theatre in Hammersmith. Playfair engaged Darcy Braddell to remodel the house. Humphry Deane was jointly credited with the remodelling work. Deane was Braddell's partner and one of the first Anglo-Indians residing in England descending from Sake Dean Mahomed. Work began on the house in May 1922. In the spring of 1923, Playfair and his family moved into Thurloe Lodge. Giles Playfair, Nigel Playfair's son, wrote that his father "took as much interest in the building of his house as he had ever taken in one of his productions at the Lyric. Hardly a day passed without his meeting D'Arcy Braddell to discuss a new idea or to look over a new plan". The remodelling had cost twice as much as anticipated, and proved a drain on his finances in the wake of the failure of his light opera Midsummer Madness. Playfair would hold rehearsals for Midsummer Madness in the garden of Thurloe Lodge. The Playfair family moved from the house in late 1924 or early 1925, and Playfair found that the house sold for a far higher sum than he had anticipated. The actor John Gielgud attended Playfair's parties at the house and met the actors James Whale and his partner Doris Zinkeisen there. He recalled that they were the most "striking pair" in the room.

Playfair's interior decoration of Thurloe Lodge under highly individualistic for the early 1920s, though less daring than his previous residence in Pelham Crescent. The dining room had "emerald green curtains and a green carpet with a magenta border" to contrast the "waxed silver spruce" woodwork. In Playfair's study the floor had a chequer-board pattern.

Thurloe Lodge was the residence of Mark Birley for 30 years. Birley founded Annabel's nightclub in Berkeley Square. He died in 2007. Birley's daughter, India Jane Birley, sold Thurloe Lodge in 2011 for £17 million. An auction of 500 of Mark Birley's possessions from the house was held at Sotheby's in March 2013. The auction realised £3.85 million. A design by Nicky Haslam for a room at Thurloe Lodge for Mark Birley sold at Bonhams auction house in 2019. India Jane married the antiquarian horologist Sebastian Whitestone at the house in July 2008.

Birley's extensive art collection was displayed throughout the house. A planning application to demolish the house and replace it with a neoclassical residence with a two-storey basement was subsequently approved by the Royal Borough of Kensington and Chelsea. Birley's son, Robin, said that he would consider it "vandalism" if the house was to be demolished, feeling that "It is a handsome 1840s house and I am amazed they think they can get away with it".

Birley's close friend, David Wynne-Morgan, lived in a cottage attached to Thurloe Lodge for over 10 years. Wynne-Morgan described the house under Birley as " ... sensational and beautiful — the biggest bachelor pad in London — and it was beautifully done".

Thurloe Lodge was not listed on the National Heritage List for England.
