= Lucy Birley =

British model (1959–2018)

- Born: Lucy Helmore; 18 September 1959; Oswestry, Shropshire, England
- Died: 23 July 2018 (aged 58); County Clare, Ireland
- Other name: Lucy Ferry
- Occupations: Socialite; model; photographer
- Spouses: Bryan Ferry (m. 1982; div. 2003) Robin Birley (m. 2006)
- Children: 4, including Otis
- Father: Patrick Helmore

Lucy Margaret Mary Birley (née Helmore; 18 September 1959 – 23 July 2018) was a British model, photographer, and socialite.

== Early life ==
Birley was born in Shropshire and raised in Kensington She was the daughter of Mary (née Hull) and Patrick Helmore, an underwriter at the Lloyd's of London insurance corporation. Her brother is Edward Helmore, a journalist for The Guardian and The Observer.

She attended Woldingham School and began fox-hunting at the age of 12.

She left home at 17 and moved in with several friends, including actor Rupert Everett.

== Career ==
Birley (then Helmore) began her career as a fashion model in her late teens. She was photographed by Steven Meisel and Robert Mapplethorpe and influenced designers Christian Lacroix, Manolo Blahnik and Philip Treacy.

In May 1982, she was photographed wearing a medieval helmet and holding a falcon at Crumlin Lodge, outside of Inverin, Connemara for the cover of Roxy Music's album Avalon.

As a photographer, she worked solely with manual cameras and favoured a twin-lens Rolleiflex camera. Birley developed her own film and exhibited her work in London. Some of her subjects were Damien Hirst and Isabella Blow.

== Personal life ==
She began dating Bryan Ferry after his girlfriend Jerry Hall left him for Mick Jagger. Ferry was 14 years her senior.

On 26 June 1982, at the age of 22, she married Bryan Ferry at the Church of St Anthony and St George at Duncton, West Sussex. They had four sons: Otis, Isaac, Tara, and Merlin. They divorced on 31 March 2003.

She battled alcoholism, substance dependency and depression. In the 1990s, Birley attended Narcotics Anonymous and Alcoholics Anonymous to help recover from addiction.

In October 2006, she married Robin Birley, son of Mark Birley and Lady Annabel Goldsmith.

== Death ==
She died of a self-inflicted gunshot wound on 23 July 2018, aged 58, while on holiday in County Clare, Ireland, following what was described by her brother Ed Helmore as "a long battle with depression". Her husband announced her death in a joint statement with her children: "On Monday Lucy Birley (nee Helmore) passed away whilst on holiday in Ireland, surrounded by her beloved dogs, Daisy, Peg and Daphne. Her husband Robin, and her sons – Otis, Isaac, Tara and Merlin – are understandably devastated and request that their privacy be respected during this difficult time".

Birley's ashes were scattered at her mother's grave in County Clare.
