= Jemima Goldsmith =

British journalist and producer

Jemima Goldsmith O'Reilly
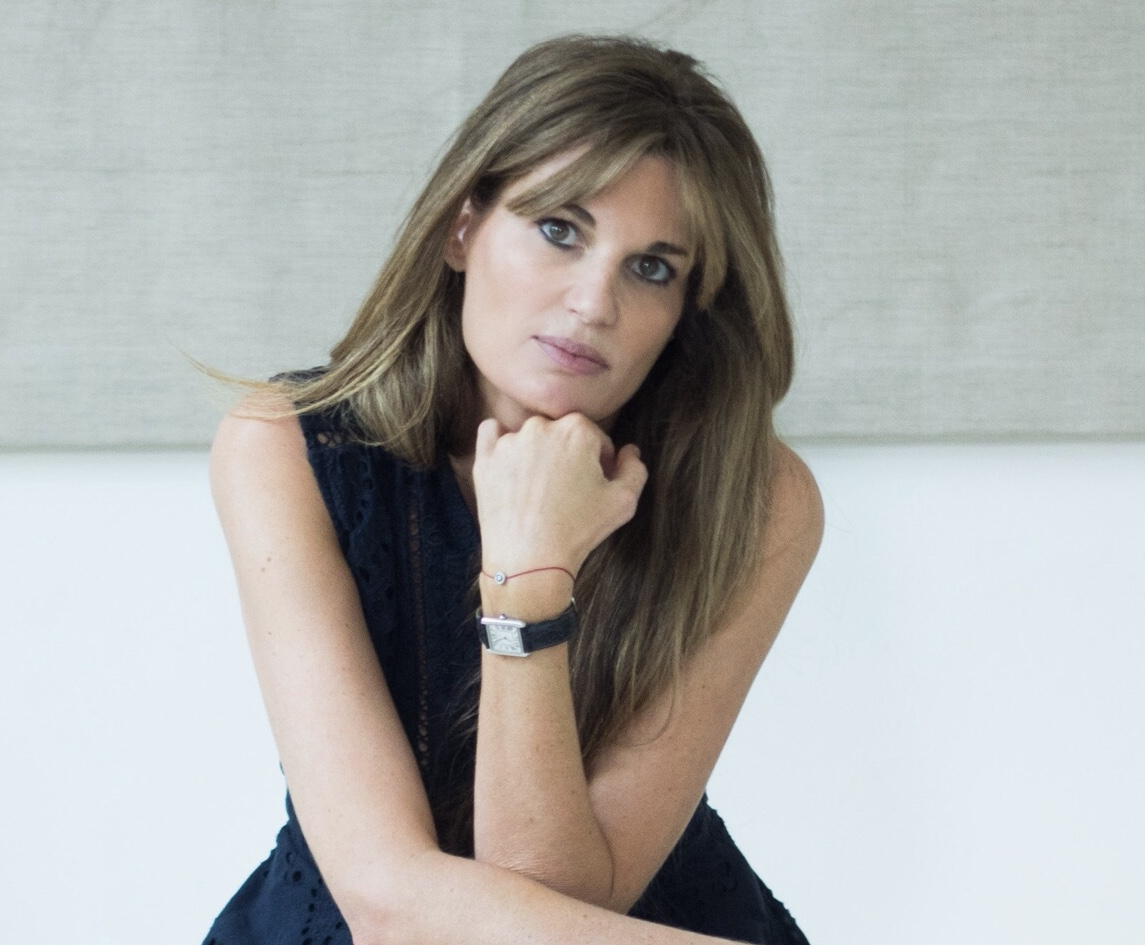
- Goldsmith in 2018
- Born: Jemima Marcelle Goldsmith; 30 January 1974 (age 52); Chelsea, London, England
- Citizenship: United Kingdom; Pakistan
- Education: University of Bristol; University of London
- Occupations: Journalist; screenwriter
- Years active: 1998–present
- Spouses: Imran Khan (m. 1995; div. 2004) Cameron O'Reilly (m. 2026)
- Children: 2
- Parents: James Goldsmith (father); Annabel Goldsmith (mother)
- Family: Goldsmith (by birth); Khan (ex by marriage); O'Reilly (by marriage)

Jemima Marcelle Goldsmith O'Reilly (formerly Khan; née Goldsmith, 30 January 1974), formerly known professionally as Jemima Khan, is an English TV and film producer and screenwriter. She is the founder of Instinct Productions, a television production company. She has written and been an associate or guest editor for the British political and cultural magazine The New Statesman, and European editor-at-large for the American magazine Vanity Fair. She was married to Pakistani cricketer and politician Imran Khan from 1995 until 2004, during which time she lived in Pakistan; they have two sons.

== Early life and education ==
Jemima Marcelle Goldsmith was born on 30 January 1974 at Chelsea and Westminster Hospital in London, the eldest child of Lady Annabel Goldsmith (née Vane-Tempest-Stewart) and financier Sir James Goldsmith (1933–1997). Her mother, from an aristocratic Anglo−Irish family, was the daughter of the 8th Marquess of Londonderry. Goldsmith's father was the son of a luxury hotel tycoon and former Conservative MP, Major Frank Goldsmith, who was a member of the aristocratic Goldsmith family of German Jewish descent.

Jemima's parents married in 1978 in order to legitimise their children. She has two younger brothers, Zac Goldsmith and Ben Goldsmith, and five paternal and three maternal half-siblings, including Robin Birley and India Jane Birley.

Goldsmith grew up at Ormeley Lodge and attended The Old Vicarage preparatory school, then Francis Holland Girls School. In 1993, Goldsmith enrolled at the University of Bristol and studied English, but she dropped out when she married Imran Khan in 1995. She eventually completed her bachelor's degree in March 2002 with upper second-class honours. She later studied at the School of Oriental and African Studies and was awarded a master of arts degree in Middle Eastern Studies, focusing on Modern Trends in Islam, from the University of London in 2003. She was a close companion and friend of Diana, Princess of Wales.

== Career ==
=== Film, television, and theatre ===
In 2015, Goldsmith founded Instinct Productions, specialising in television, documentaries and film production, based in London.

Through Instinct Productions, Goldsmith was an executive producer for the Emmy-nominated six-part documentary series The Clinton Affair, alongside Alex Gibney and director Blair Foster, for the A&E Network.

She was an executive producer of Emmy-nominated The Case Against Adnan Syed, a TV documentary series for Sky Atlantic and HBO about the Adnan Syed case. The series was inspired by the 'Serial' podcast and directed by Amy Berg ("Deliver Us from Evil").

She was a producer on the Golden Globe and Emmy-nominated Impeachment, Ryan Patrick Murphy's FX American Crime Story Season Three, a 10-part drama series about the Clinton–Lewinsky scandal.

Goldsmith wrote and produced What's Love Got to Do with It?, a cross-cultural romantic comedy for Working Title Films and Studio Canal, starring Lily James and Emma Thompson which premiered at the 2022 Toronto Film Festival and won Best Comedy at the 2022 Rome Film Festival. It was nominated for nine awards at the 2023 National Film Awards, of which it won four: Best Screenplay, Best British Film, Best Director, Best Supporting Actor.

Goldsmith executive produced Tanaz Eshaghian's Emmy-nominated As Far As They Can Run, a documentary short about children with intellectual disabilities in rural Pakistan.

She was an executive producer for the BAFTA-nominated documentary film We Steal Secrets: The Story of WikiLeaks by Alex Gibney, released in 2013. She was also the co-executive producer for the documentary films Unmanned: America's Drone Wars (released in 2013) and Making A Killing: Guns, Greed and the NRA (released in 2016), both directed by Robert Greenwald.

In 2018, it was reported that Goldsmith was slated to serve as an executive producer on a TV drama series about the Rothschild banking dynasty, written by Julian Fellowes. As of 2025, it remains unproduced.

She co-produced the play Drones, Baby, Drones at the Arcola Theatre, directed by Nicolas Kent and Mehmet Ergen, that premiered in November 2016.

She was a contributor to the fifth season of the historical drama series The Crown, which depicted the final years of Diana, Princess of Wales. She asked for her contributions to be removed as she felt the "storyline would not necessarily be told as respectfully or compassionately" as she had hoped.

In 2024, Goldsmith also produced a hit podcast called A Muslim & A Jew Go There presented by politician Sayeeda Warsi and David Baddiel. It was described in the Evening standard as "an antidote to the tribalism online" and by The Guardian as "civilised and civilizing". The podcast reached no 2 in the Apple charts and was nominated for two awards by The British Podcast Awards - for Best New Podcast and News & Current Affairs.

In 2025, she served as an executive producer on The Voice of Hind Rajab directed by Kaouther Ben Hania.

=== Journalism ===
Although Goldsmith had written articles when she lived in Pakistan, she started contributing op-eds to the United Kingdom's newspapers and magazines including The Independent, The Sunday Times, The Evening Standard and The Observer. In 2008, she was granted an exclusive interview with Pakistani president Pervez Musharraf on the eve of the elections for The Independent. She was a Sunday Telegraph columnist from 21 October 2007 to 27 January 2008.

She was a feature writer and a contributing editor for British Vogue from 2008 to 2011. In 2011, she was appointed Vanity Fair's new European editor-at-large. She was also associate editor at The Independent.

In April 2011, she guest-edited the New Statesman and themed the issue around freedom of speech. She interviewed the deputy prime minister Nick Clegg and included contributions from Russell Brand, Tim Robbins, Simon Pegg, Oliver Stone, Tony Benn, and Julian Assange, with cover art by Anish Kapoor and Damien Hirst. According to Nick Cohen in The Observer, "Jemima Khan was... the best editor of the New Statesman that the journal has had since the mid-1970s". The magazine issue included "an unexpected scoop" from Hugh Grant, who went undercover to hack Paul McMullan, a former News of the World journalist, who had been involved in hacking as a reporter. In November 2011, she joined as an associate editor of the New Statesman. She subsequently wrote several articles for the journal,

=== Charity work ===
In 1998, Goldsmith launched an eponymous fashion label that employed poor Pakistani women to embroider western clothes with eastern handiwork to be sold in London and New York. Profits were donated to her then husband's Shaukat Khanum Memorial Cancer Hospital. She ran the organisation until December 2001, when she shut down the business due to the economic situation following the September 11 attacks, and so she could focus on fundraising and on supporting her husband in Pakistani politics.

In 2008, she modelled the relaunched Azzaro Couture fragrance and was a guest co-designer of a Spring 2009 collection for Azzaro, with her fee reportedly donated to UNICEF.

As voted by Daily Telegraph readers, she won the Rover People's Award for the best dressed female celebrity at the 2001 British Fashion Awards. She was also featured on Vanity Fair's Annual International Best-Dressed List in 2004, 2005 and 2007, the last of which she was inducted into their Best Dressed Hall of Fame.

During her marriage, Goldsmith established the Jemima Khan Afghan Refugee Appeal to provide tents, clothing, food, and healthcare for Afghan refugees at Jalozai camp in Peshawar.

She became an ambassador for UNICEF UK in 2001, and made field trips to Kenya, Romania, Bangladesh, Afghanistan and Pakistan, the last of which she later helped victims of the 2005 Kashmir earthquake by raising emergency funds. She has promoted UNICEF's Breastfeeding Manifesto, Growing Up Alone and End Child Exploitation campaigns in the UK.

In 2003, she visited Palestinian refugee camps in Lebanon, Jordan, the West Bank and Gaza to promote the charity Hope and Optimism for Palestinians in the Next Generation (HOPING).

She also supports the Soil Association and the HOPING foundation for Palestinian refugee children.

=== Activism and politics ===
In addition to her charitable work, Goldsmith campaigns for various social and political causes. She has campaigned against the wars in Iraq and Afghanistan as well as for freedom of information; she attended Julian Assange's extradition hearings and gave a speech at the Stop the War Coalition's rally in defence of WikiLeaks alongside Tony Benn and Tariq Ali. Along with John Pilger and Ken Loach, she was part of the six-member group in Westminster Magistrates Court willing to post bail for Assange when he was arrested in London on 7 December 2010. However, she later changed her mind about Assange, questioning his unwillingness to answer the sexual misconduct allegations which led to his arrest and what she described as his demand for "cultish devotion" from his supporters.

In 2014, she publicly backed the Hacked Off campaign group which advocates reform of British press regulation. In August 2014, she was one of 200 public figures who were signatories to a letter to The Guardian opposing Scottish independence in the run-up to September's referendum on that issue.

On 3 November 2018, Goldsmith criticised the fact that the Government of Pakistan was considering putting the Christian woman, Asia Bibi, on the exit control list despite the fact that she was acquitted by the Supreme Court, in order to compromise with the Islamist political party Tehreek-e-Labbaik Pakistan.

In December 2023, she participated in an anti-hate vigil organised by Together for Humanity, bringing together Jews and Muslims to rally against antisemitism and Islamophobia. In The Independent she urged readers to attend and shared her experiences: "I have had first-hand experience of this [antisemitism], as my Jewishness was used as a baton to beat my politician ex-husband Imran Khan, in Pakistan, where Zionist conspiracy theories about me were fabricated – and fervour was whipped up by opposition politicians and by a partisan media." Since her marriage and subsequent divorce she has continued to receive death threats. She added that she has "seen how the term "Zionism" – much like the term "Islamism" – can sometimes be used by bigots as a fig leaf to express what is, in fact, prejudice against Jews or Muslims as a group." In a 2024 interview, she said that her father James Goldsmith had "felt he faced antisemitism from the British establishment" throughout his life.

In 2025 Goldsmith accused the Pakistani government of blocking her sons from communicating with Imran Khan and threatening them with arrest if they attempted to visit him in prison, describing the actions as a "personal vendetta".

== Personal life ==
In 1995, Goldsmith, aged 21, married Imran Khan, aged 43, a retired Pakistan cricketer who later served as Prime Minister of Pakistan from 2018 to 2022, with whom she has two sons. The couple divorced in 2004. Goldsmith holds both British and Pakistani citizenship.

Goldsmith was a close friend of Diana, Princess of Wales, who visited her in Lahore in 1996.

On 29 December 2000, Goldsmith and her family were on British Airways Flight 2069 to Kenya when a mentally ill passenger tried to seize controls in the cockpit.

In 2002, she was listed at number 18 with £20 million on the Evening Standard's young millionaires list.

Following her divorce in 2004, she returned to London and later became involved in a romantic relationship with actor Hugh Grant. Her relationship was scrutinised extensively by the tabloid media. In February 2007, Grant announced that the couple had "decided to split amicably". Grant's spokesman added that he "has nothing but positive things to say about Jemima."

In September 2013, The Daily Telegraph reported that she was dating British comedian and actor Russell Brand. The following year the couple applied for an injunction against a masseuse, Szilvia Berki, who had accused Brand of assaulting her during an appointment paid for by Goldsmith. The injunction prevented the woman from speaking about the alleged assault, other than exceptions listed in the court order. In September 2014, she and Brand separated. In November 2026, after Brand's conviction for rape and sexual assault and consequent imposition of a 10-year prison sentence, she said that he had been violent, coercive, and abusive during the course of their relationship. She once had to call police to remove him from her home in Oxfordshire after a violent incident. She said that she had chosen not to press charges nor go public about this, "as [she] was worried about the impact of the press attention on my then teenage children". She also said that she had agreed to Brand's lawyer's suggestion to seek an injunction against Berki after the masseuse had sent her antisemitic threats.

In a 2024 interview, she embraced both her Jewish and Muslim family ties. However, she distanced herself from identifying with one faith group and community: "I feel as though I am sometimes caught between two cultures and points of view and worlds... I definitely, definitely don't feel that I have a tribe."

In 2026, Goldsmith married Dublin-born businessman Cameron O'Reilly, son of former media and industrial magnate Tony O'Reilly.

=== Marriage to Imran Khan ===
On 16 May 1995, Goldsmith and Imran Khan were married in a Nikah ceremony in Paris. They also had a civil ceremony on 21 June 1995 at the Richmond Register Office, followed by a midsummer ball at Ormeley Lodge. A few months before her wedding, she converted to Islam, citing the writings of Muhammad Asad, Charles le Gai Eaton and Alija Izetbegović as her influences. Upon her wedding to Khan, she relocated to his hometown, Lahore, Pakistan, where she learned to speak Urdu and also wore traditional Pakistani clothes.

She wrote in a 2008 article for The Times that she "over-conformed in [her] eagerness to be accepted" into the "new and radically different culture" of Pakistan. Goldsmith stated that prior to her conversion to Islam she was technically Anglican but "was made familiar with Jewish traditions", since her paternal grandfather Frank Goldsmith was German Jewish. During her marriage, her Jewish heritage was used by Khan's political opponents to question their credibility in Pakistani politics, especially concerning accusations that they supported the Jewish lobby.

Goldsmith has two sons from her marriage to Khan.

In 1999, she was charged in Pakistan with illegally exporting Islamic era antique tiles. She said that the charge was a fabrication to harass and damage her husband, but nevertheless left Pakistan to stay with her mother for fear of incarceration. After General Pervez Musharraf overthrew elected Prime Minister Nawaz Sharif in a coup d'état in 1999, the Ministry of Culture and Archaeology verified the tiles were not antiques, and the court dropped the charges, allowing her to return to Lahore.

Goldsmith supported her husband as he became more involved in his Pakistan Tehreek-e-Insaf party.

On 22 June 2004, it was announced that the couple had divorced, ending the nine-year marriage, because it was "difficult for Jemima to adapt to the political life of Imran Khan in Pakistan". The marriage ended amicably. After the divorce, Goldsmith returned to Britain with their two sons. According to the divorce settlement, the boys visit Khan in Pakistan during their school holidays and, when he came to London to see them, he used to stay with his former mother-in-law, Lady Annabel Goldsmith. According to Jemima, she and Khan remained on good terms.
