= Bath & Racquets Club =

Private members' gym and squash club in Mayfair, London

Coordinates: 51°30′45″N 00°08′48″W

The Bath & Racquets Club Ltd
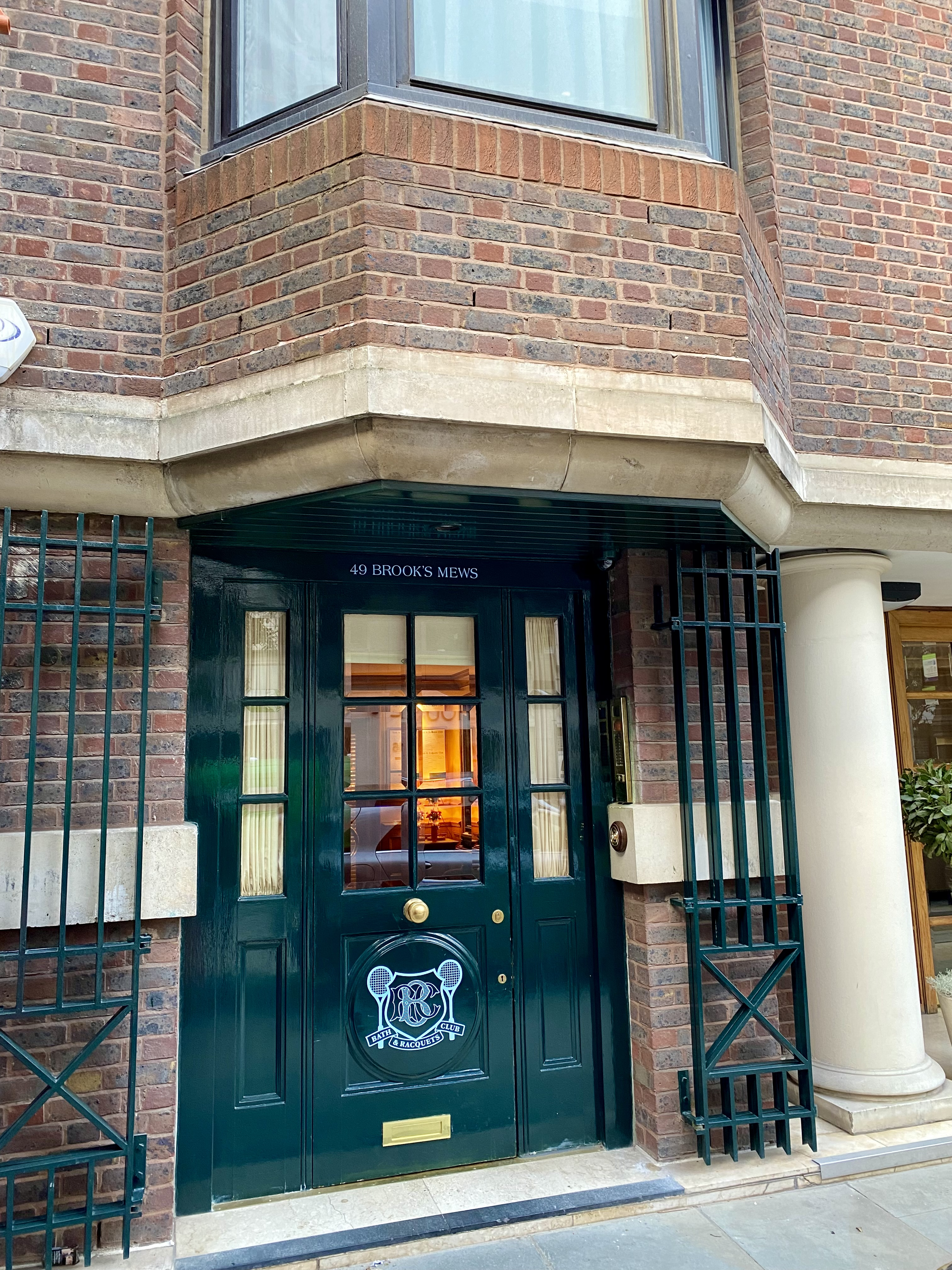
- Formation: 1989
- Founder: Mark Birley
- Type: Private members' gym and squash club
- Location: 49 Brook's Mews, Mayfair, London, England
- Members: c.300
- Owner: Richard Caring
- Website: www.bathandracquetsclub.co.uk

The Bath & Racquets Club is a private members' gym and squash club at 49 Brook's Mews in London's Mayfair district. The club has 300 members and is the most expensive private gym club in London. It was established by Mark Birley in 1989. Birley sold the club with his four other Mayfair clubs, Annabel's, Harry's Bar, Mark's Club, and George, to Richard Caring in 2007.

== History ==
The Bath & Racquets Club is located at 49 Brook's Mews in London's Mayfair district. The club was established by Mark Birley in 1989 after a visit to the Racquet and Tennis Club in New York City. He had previously opened the members clubs Annabel's in 1963 and Harry's Bar in 1979. The significant financial cost of opening the Bath & Racquets Club forced Birley to sell part of the wine cellar of Annabel's. In 2007 Birley sold his four Mayfair clubs, including the Bath & Racquets, to Richard Caring for £90 million. Wafic Saïd was a director of the club in the early 1990s. The club is now part of the 'Birley Clubs' owned by Caring including Annabel's, Harry's Bar, Mark's Club, and George.

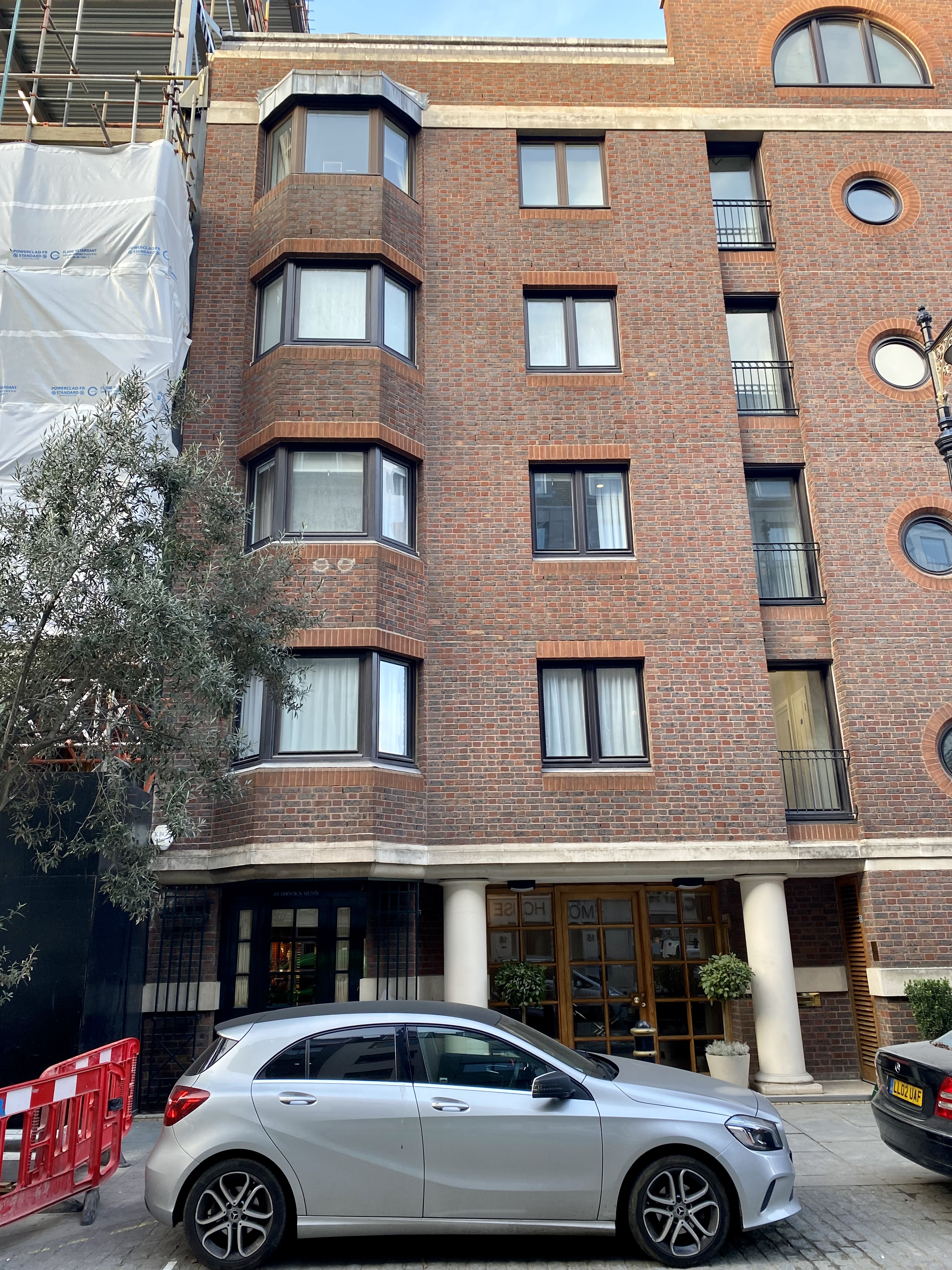
49 Brook's Mews, site of the Bath & Racquets Club, in January 2022

== Membership ==
The club opened in May 1989 with an annual membership fee of £2,000 (equivalent to £5,292 in 2025). The annual fee had risen to £7,500 in 2019, with a joining fee of £1,000. In 2019 the club had c.300 members with a lengthy waiting list. Prospective members must be proposed and seconded by current members of the club. The Bath & Racquets Club is an all male club; though women are permitted to spectate games of squash from the club's gallery. Women were described as able to be admitted 'by arrangement' by The Times in 1989. The Bath & Racquets Club is London's most expensive private gym and squash club.

In the early 1990s guests of Claridge's hotel (located behind the club on Brook Street) were permitted to use the facilities of the club.

The magazine executive Nicholas Coleridge was a member of the Bath & Racquets Club and would frequently meet the restaurateur David Tang there. Coleridge recalled in his memoir, The Glossy Years, that he and Tang would never "do any actual gym or go near the StairMasters or running machines" but instead spend their time at the club "sitting on a sofa eating smoked salmon and gossiping". Coleridge also agreed to meet the publicist Michael Cole in the club's steam baths to ensure that neither of them carried covert listening devices during the libel battle between Cole's employer, Mohamed Al-Fayed, and Coleridge's employers, the publishers Condé Nast. Coleridge profiled the members of the Bath & Racquets Club as consisting of "Greek shipping billionaires" and managers of hedge funds.

== Design and facilities ==
The club has squash courts, a gym, steam baths, a lounge for members with a bar, and a barber's shop. It is set over two floors. The steam-rooms, showers, and urinals of the club are made from green onyx. The onyx was found in Torquay, Devon, and dates from the 1930s. The changing room was furnished with chaise longues designed by Le Corbusier upon opening in 1989. Birley described the decor of the club as "post-Mussolini epic style". Members change into white sports clothes after entering the club. Prior to opening the Bath & Racquets Club, Birley had "observed with horror what can emerge from the changing rooms of even the exclusive squash and tennis clubs" and said that "In any club, when someone opens a locker, you are appalled at what tumbles out ... If people insist on wearing their own clothes they must be white". Sports shirts embroidered with the red and green insignia of the club are issued to members. The usage of mobile telephones is banned in the club.

Upon its opening The Times praised the "comfortable clubby atmosphere" of the Bath & Racquets Club. Birley's entry in the Oxford Dictionary of National Biography described the club as possessing Birley's "hallmarks of elegance, luxury, and exclusion". Profiling the club for Spear's Wealth Management Survey, Arun Kakar described the Bath & Racquets Club as a "curious, rarefied hybrid of gentlemen's club and sport's club" which was "neither stuffy nor over-polished ... Its traditional styling is distinctively country house" and that it was "one of those special London safe havens ... detached from the frenetic city outside and yet providing something totally understanding of its culture and rhythm". The interior of the club was designed by Anthony Collett and David Champion. Nicholas Coleridge described the interior of the club as "exactly like Annabel's with oil paintings and Turkish rugs, but with Cybex exercise machines instead of a dance floor".

Aman Khan was the Bath & Racquets Club's resident professional squash player upon its opening. In 2019 the club's resident squash players included a former world No. 2 and No. 8.
