= Robin Birley (businessman) =

British businessman

- Born: Robin Marcus Birley; 19 February 1958 (age 68); Westminster, London, England
- Education: Eton College
- Occupation: Businessman
- Spouse: Lucy Ferry (m. 2006; died 2018)
- Children: 1
- Parents: Mark Birley (father); Lady Annabel Goldsmith (mother)
- Relatives: India Jane Birley (sister); Loulou de la Falaise (cousin)

Robin Marcus Birley (born 19 February 1958) is an English businessman, entrepreneur and political donor. He is the son of Lady Annabel Goldsmith and the nightclub owner Mark Birley. He had a brother, Rupert, who disappeared and is presumed deceased, and a sister, India Jane Birley. His half-brother is the former MP, now peer, Zac Goldsmith.

== Early life ==
Birley grew up in London with his siblings, Rupert and India Jane. He was educated at St Aubyn's School in Rottingdean, East Sussex and Eton College. His parents were divorced after his mother had two children with his father's friend Sir James Goldsmith, whom she later married. Birley has three half-siblings through his mother's second marriage, Zac Goldsmith, Jemima Goldsmith and Ben Goldsmith.

During his adolescence Birley was mauled by a tiger at Howletts Zoo, the private zoo of family friend John Aspinall. The bones on one side of his face were crushed. He has endured years of cosmetic surgery but the accident left him with permanent scarring.

== Career ==
=== Private members' clubs ===
Birley owns and runs 5 Hertford Street (5HS), a private members' club in Mayfair and Oswald's at 25 Albemarle Street. Having found a dilapidated block of buildings in Shepherd Market, Mayfair, he raised £30 million to refurbish them; fashion designer Rifat Özbek was commissioned to design the interiors. 5 Hertford Street opened in June 2012 with a launch party attended by Mick Jagger, Kate Moss, and Daphne Guinness. The basement nightclub was named Loulou's after Birley's late cousin, Loulou de la Falaise. Over the following five years, 5HS became a staple of London's social scene. The success of 5HS emboldened Birley to launch new membership-based venues. In November 2017, Avenue reported that Birley was close to finalising a deal to start work on a new club, akin to 5HS but with bedrooms for members, near Union Square, Manhattan.

In May 2019 the club faced claims from backroom staff who had protested against "poverty pay" demanding the real living wage pay rate and an occupational sick pay.

In March 2025, Birley opened Maxime's on the Upper East Side, Manhattan, as his first US-based private members' club. The club occupies the site of the former Westbury Hotel at 828 Madison Avenue and is named for Maxime Le Bailly, Comtesse de la Falaise, the paternal aunt of Birley. In conjunction with the club, Birley also opened a "Birley Bakery" in the building next door.

=== Birley Sandwiches ===
Birley's first entrepreneurial success came with the foundation of Birley Sandwiches in the early 1980s. Over the following 30 years, he has gradually expanded the concept – sandwiches made in front of the customer from fresh ingredients – into a successful chain which now comprises 15 outlets in the City of London and Canary Wharf. In December 2022, Birley opened the French boulangerie "Birley Bakery" at 28 Cale Street in Chelsea.

== Environmentalism ==
Heavily influenced by Edward Goldsmith, his step-father's brother and the founder of The Ecologist, Birley has always maintained a keen interest in environmental matters. In 2002, he set up Envirotrade, a project assisting small farmers in Mozambique through reducing emissions from deforestation and forest degradation (REDD) and agroforestry by generating carbon credits through which they could earn a better living wage. The Sofala Project, in Mozambique, remains the only carbon project to have been awarded gold in all three categories of the Climate Community and Biodiversity Standard. The Sofala Community Carbon Project earned $3,453,228 from carbon offset sales between 2004 and 2013, and the participating communities earned $2,136,744 from agroforestry and avoided deforestation activities directly from the project.

However, the crash in the international carbon trading market meant that Birley increasingly had to fund the projects out of his own pocket. Having spent several million, he handed the projects back to the community in 2012, but continued making donations until 2015.

In April 2010, the BBC admitted that a documentary about Birley titled Taking The Credit should not have been shown because of conflicts of interest. The BBC trust stated in its final report in 2011 that "there was no suggestion that the ACLT, Envirotrade or any personnel connected to the organisations had acted improperly".

Birley is a trustee of the Howletts and Port Lympne Animal Park which is committed to returning rare and endangered animals back to their natural habitats. Working with the two Parks, Howletts Wild Animal Park opened in 1975 and the Port Lympne Reserve opened in 1976, the Foundation runs its own projects overseas and support other reintroduction programmes across Asia and Africa.

== Personal life ==
In the late 1990s, with his father Mark unable to direct his Mayfair private members' clubs on a day-to-day basis, Robin and his sister India Jane took on an increasing role in the management of the clubs, which comprised Annabel's (named after his mother), Harry's Bar, Mark's Club, George, and the Bath & Racquets Club.

In 2006 Birley was dismissed from his position by his father, after a family row following his hiring of a private investigator to do a background check on his sister's new boyfriend. Birley and India Jane were later reconciled at her wedding to Sebastian Whitestone. Mark Birley, by now unwell (he died in August 2007) and without his son to run the group of clubs, sold them to the clothing tycoon Richard Caring.

In 1986 his brother Rupert was presumed drowned in mysterious circumstances whilst working in Togo in West Africa, but his body was never recovered.

Birley has a daughter, Maud, by a former girlfriend. He married Lucy Ferry, the ex-wife of Bryan Ferry, in October 2006. She died by suicide on 23 July 2018 at the age of 58.

In December 2018, Birley joined residents' protest against plans for a new 24-hour casino in Mayfair.

== Politics ==
Birley donated £200,000 to the UK Independence Party in the 12 months prior to May 2015.
