= Lady Annabel Goldsmith =

English socialite (1934–2025)

- Born: Annabel Vane-Tempest-Stewart; 11 June 1934; Westminster, London, England
- Died: 18 October 2025 (aged 91)
- Spouses: Mark Birley (m. 1954; div. 1975) Sir James Goldsmith (m. 1978; died 1997)
- Children: 6, including: Robin and India Jane Birley; Jemima, Zac, and Ben Goldsmith
- Parents: Robin Vane-Tempest-Stewart, 8th Marquess of Londonderry; Romaine Combe

Lady Annabel Goldsmith (née Vane-Tempest-Stewart, formerly Birley; 11 June 1934 – 18 October 2025) was an English socialite, author, and political activist. She was the eponym of Annabel's, the exclusive Mayfair nightclub founded by her first husband, businessman Mark Birley. A prominent London society hostess during the 1960s and 1970s, she attracted media attention for her relationship with financier Sir James Goldsmith, which began during her marriage to Birley and later led to their own marriage. In her later years, she published memoirs and supported political and philanthropic causes.

== Background and image ==
Annabel Vane-Tempest-Stewart was born on 11 June 1934 in London, the second of three children in an Anglo-Irish aristocratic family with roots in Ulster and County Durham. She was the younger daughter of Robin Vane-Tempest-Stewart, 8th Marquess of Londonderry, and Romaine Combe, whose father was Major Boyce Combe of Surrey.

She became Lady Annabel as a young girl in February 1949, when her father became marquess on the death of his father, the controversial Ulster Unionist politician The 7th Marquess of Londonderry. Her mother died of cancer in 1951, but the illness was kept a secret by her parents. She later said, "Cancer was such a taboo then – Mummy didn't even tell her sisters." Subsequently, her father became a chronic alcoholic and died from liver failure at the age of 52 on 17 October 1955. "My father was a really wonderful man but after my mother died, we couldn't talk to him as we had done before. He couldn't face life without her and he turned into Jekyll and Hyde almost overnight", she explained.

She was named after her mother's favourite song, "Miss Annabel Lee", and grew up as a country child at her family's former estates of Mount Stewart, Wynyard Park, and Londonderry House. She was educated at Southover Manor School in Sussex and Cuffy's Tutorial College in Oxford. Awkward and shy in her youth, she was an avid reader, equestrian, and a Girl Guide for the Bullfinch Patrol. She transformed from an unconfident and self-described "skinny, gauche young girl" into a socialite during the 1950s and 1960s. Queen Elizabeth II attended her coming-out ball in 1952. As part of the London social circle, she was known for her sense of humour, down-to-earth personality, and love of children and dogs. She was never a drinker. She chain-smoked until the age of 40.

== Personal life ==
Lady Annabel was the mother of Rupert, Robin, and India Jane Birley and Jemima, Zac, and Ben Goldsmith. She had referred to herself as "an incredible mother, rather a good mistress, but not a very good wife". With six children and five miscarriages, her primary vocation was motherhood, which prompted her to say: "I'm not judgmental about women who work, but I was so besotted with my children I never wanted them out of my sight." She was also considered a mother figure by her nieces, Ladies Cosima and Sophia Vane-Tempest-Stewart, and Diana, Princess of Wales. As the wife and ex-wife of two unfaithful men, she explained her marriage philosophy to The Times in 1987: "I can never understand the wives who really mind, the wives who set such store by fidelity. How extraordinary, and how mad they are. Because, surely, if the man goes out and he comes back, it's not actually doing any harm."

=== Annabel's and the Birleys ===
On 10 March 1954, at the age of 19, she married businessman Mark Birley at the Caxton Hall register office in London. Birley famously paid tribute to her by naming in her honour his nightclub, Annabel's, which opened on 4 June 1963 and was run by Birley for more than forty years. During the 1960s, Lady Annabel was a constant presence at Annabel's, known as one of the grandest nightclubs of the 1960s and 1970s, where she entertained guests ranging from Ted and Robert F. Kennedy to Frank Sinatra, Prince Charles, Richard Nixon, and Muhammad Ali. "I used to be there every night, even when I had three small children to take to school the next day. It was like a second home to me", she recalled.

She raised her three children with Birley at Pelham Cottage. Her eldest son Rupert, who was born on 20 August 1955, studied at Eton College and Christ Church, Oxford. In 1986, he disappeared off the coast of Togo in West Africa, where he was presumed drowned. "There really is nothing worse than losing a child – and there is something special about your first-born", she said, adding that, "Because I was so young when Rupert was born ... we were more like good friends than mother and son." Her second son Robin (b. 19 February 1958) is a businessman, whose face was disfigured as a child when he was mauled by a tigress at John Aspinall's private zoo. Having let him go near the pregnant tigress, Lady Annabel said, "It was my own fault. I was, am, angry with myself." Her first daughter India Jane (born 14 January 1961), the granddaughter of society portrait painter Sir Oswald Birley, is an artist.

The Birleys separated in 1972 and later divorced in 1975 after the birth of her second child with James Goldsmith. "Our breakup was because of Mark's infidelities, not because I fell in love with Jimmy", she told Vanity Fair writer Maureen Orth after Birley's death. Revealing that Birley had numerous other girlfriends from the beginning of their relationship, she added: "I think he was absolutely incapable of being faithful. He was a serial adulterer. Like a butterfly, he had to seduce every woman."

Despite their divorce, the two remained best friends, talking to each other every day and holidaying together until Birley's death in August 2007. Birley said they were "the true loves of each other's lives".

=== Goldsmith affair and remarriage ===
In 1964, she embarked on a decade-long extramarital affair with Sir James Goldsmith, a member of the Goldsmith family. Though both she and Goldsmith, who was then married to his second wife Ginette Lery, believed that the affair would be a passing fling, it soon gained her notoriety in London's gossip columns as a modern mistress. She was eventually coaxed into having his children by their friend John Aspinall, who was also a former friend of Mark Birley who introduced her to Goldsmith.

While still legally married to Birley, she gave birth to Jemima (b. 30 January 1974) and Zac (b. 20 January 1975). Her last child Ben Goldsmith was born on 28 October 1980 at 46, after two consecutive miscarriages. The children were raised in Ormeley Lodge in Ham, London. The half-Jewish and half-Catholic Goldsmith was an occasional presence in their lives as he divided time between three families. In 1978, Goldsmith and Lady Annabel married solely to legitimise their children.

Goldsmith moved to New York with his new mistress Laure Boulay de la Meurthe, daughter of Alfred, Comte Boulay de la Meurthe, in 1981 and spent the last years of his life mostly in France and Mexico. He became known for quoting Sacha Guitry's words, "If you marry your mistress you create a job vacancy." Often wrongly credited with the quote, Goldsmith admitted, "I quoted him at dinner, and it was pinned on me. I don't mind. ... I just don't want to claim what's not mine." In 1997, she and her youngest three children inherited a portion of Goldsmith's wealth, estimated varyingly at £1.6 and $1.7–$2.4 billion.

She resided in Ormeley Lodge, a 6-acre (2.4 ha) Georgian mansion on the edge of Richmond Park, with two Grand Basset Griffon Vendéens, Daisy and Lily, and three Norfolk terriers, Barney, Boris and Bindy. In 2003, she remarked on her children's varied marital patterns by observing, "All my children with James marry young and breed, and my children with Mark do the opposite."

=== Later life and death ===
Lady Annabel had fourteen grandchildren. She spent part of each year at her 250-acre (1.0 km^{2}) organic farm in the hills above Benahavís and had a 1930s holiday home by the seaside in Bognor Regis, West Sussex. Asked about her regrets in life, in 2004, she confessed wishing that she had, instead of marrying twice, been "a one-man woman".

Lady Annabel died on 18 October 2025, aged 91.

== Activism and philanthropy ==
Lady Annabel was president of the Richmond Park branch of the Royal Society of St George, a patriotic outreach society aimed to motivate youth. She was a donor to and supporter of the Countryside Alliance, the environmental charity The Soil Association, and African Solutions to African Problems (ASAP), which works to mitigate the impact of HIV/AIDS on orphans and vulnerable children in South Africa. As an animal lover, she was also one of the patrons of the Dogs Trust and a supporter of the Battersea Dogs & Cats Home, along with being vice-president of the British Show Pony Society. She had an early interest in journalism but declined a low-level position at the Daily Mail at age 19 to get married instead. She contributed opinion editorials to national newspapers The Sunday Times, The Daily Telegraph and The Sunday Telegraph, among others.

Inspired by Hungarian Premier Imre Nagy's radio address during the Hungarian Revolution, in November 1956, she and Birley volunteered with the Save the Children organisation in Vienna. She organised charitable donations and travelled daily to look after refugees who crossed the Austrian border into the frontier town of Andau. In May 1997, she campaigned with her second husband in Putney, the constituency unsuccessfully contested by Goldsmith for his Referendum Party. She continued to support her husband's ideas, like the single currency referendum, after his death as part of the Referendum Movement, which was headed by Paul Sykes and Lord McAlpine of West Green and of which she became honorary president.

In January 1999, she launched the Democracy Movement, of which she was president and her son Robin was chairman until 2004. Starting from 12 January 2001, the organisation launched a £500,000 advertising and leafleting campaign to expose the parliamentary votes of pro-Brussels candidates in 120 "target" seats before the May general elections. The Democracy Movement released two million pamphlets carrying gloom-ridden headlines about a European state and published full page local newspaper advertisements in the constituencies of 70 Labour MPs, 35 Liberal Democrats, six Conservatives and three Scottish National Party candidates. Describing the campaign as an effort "in memory of Jimmy", she said:

I'm not anti-European – my husband was half European and my children are a quarter French. I just don't want to be governed by Brussels, and I don't think people want to give up their sovereignty. Jimmy used to describe it as sitting at the top of the mountain watching a train crash – that was like us heading for the European superstate.

On 17 December 2007, she testified at the inquest into the death of Diana, Princess of Wales, where she denied the rumour that the princess was in love with and/or pregnant by Dodi Fayed. "She was in love with Hasnat Khan. I felt she was still on the rebound from Hasnat Khan... She might have been having a wonderful time with him, I'm sure, but I thought her remark that she needed marriage like a rash meant that she was not serious about it", Lady Annabel told the jury.

== Books ==
In March 2004, Weidenfeld & Nicolson published her memoirs Annabel: An Unconventional Life, which recounted her life from a pre-World War II aristocratic childhood and her glamorous social circle of the 1960s to her status as an active grandmother. The book was serialised in The Mail on Sunday. On the promotion tour, she gave numerous interviews and participated in a discussion with historian Andrew Roberts at the annual Cheltenham Festival of Literature in April 2004. A Daily Telegraph profile observed that, "What seems to have kept Annabel afloat is her almost naive ability to let bygones be bygones". Claudia FitzHerbert's review in the same newspaper denounced the autobiography as "woodenly hilarious" and "disappointingly vague".

David Chapman, reviewing the book for the Newsquest Media Group Newspapers, concluded, "This is a decidedly funny memoir that includes the scrapes and japes of nob culture." Lorne Jackson of the Sunday Mercury was totally dismissive of what he called "a dull memoir", stating: "This could have all been explained in one page, possibly two if the type was particularly large." The Sunday Times commented that, "Annabel comes across as a decent woman ... but her writing is flat, with a few too many clumsy constructions, and her story lacks drama, even when terrible things happen to her." Biographer Selina Hastings called it "a well-ordered, decently written book," while the Evening Standard wrote, "Goldsmith herself comes across as fun and warm, a good sport, if sometimes strangely submissive and a little overfond of her own breasts." Annabel became a No.1 London best-seller for non-fiction. Nationally, the memoirs reached the top ten non-fiction best-sellers in England, fluctuating from No. 7 to No. 4 and then No. 6.

She followed her autobiography, two years later in September 2006, by ghost-writing her pet dog Copper's autobiography in the name of Copper: A Dog's Life. Her daughter India Jane illustrated the book. Copper was originally bought by the Goldsmiths as a reward to their daughter Jemima for passing her Common Entrance Examination, but he remained in Lady Annabel's care for most of his life and had an adventurous time in Richmond. "Amid tough competition, he was probably the greatest character I ever knew", she told The Daily Telegraph. The mongrel, who died in 1998, was famed for travelling by bus, chasing joggers and visiting a Richmond pub, the Dysart Arms.

Her literary efforts originated after the experience, according to her, of a life-defining moment on 29 December 2000. She, her son Benjamin, daughter Jemima and her two sons, plus her niece Lady Cosima Somerset and her two children were travelling to Kenya, when a passenger on their British Airways plane stormed into the cockpit and tried to seize the controls. The autopilot on the flight to Nairobi became temporarily disengaged and the jumbo was knocked off course, abruptly diving and plunging 17,000 feet (5,200 m) below. "Nobody on that plane thought, 'am I going to die?'" she later recalled. "They all thought, 'we are going to die'. It was horrible, horrible." This near-death incident was credited by Lady Annabel as the catalyst for her writings. "I had always thought that I would write a book", she claimed, "but writing my memoirs didn't really come into my head until after that flight." In the introduction to Annabel, she wrote:

Shortly after the accident, with an awareness of how close my children and their children came to being denied their future, an understanding of the fragility of my own hold on life and a profound appreciation for my own past, I decided to write this book.

Her third book, No Invitation Required: The Pelham Cottage Years, was released in November 2009. The book is composed of "intimate and perceptive essays [and] pen-portraits of some of the extraordinary figures that entered the Birley and Goldsmith circles – among them, Lord Lambton, Patrick Plunket, John Aspinall, Geoffrey Keating, Lord Lucan, Dominic Elwes and Claus von Bülow."

== Bibliography ==
- Goldsmith, Annabel (2004). Annabel: An Unconventional Life: The Memoirs of Lady Annabel Goldsmith. London: Weidenfeld & Nicolson. ISBN 0-297-82966-1.
- —— (2006). Copper: A Dog's Life. Illustrated by India Jane Birley. London: Time Warner. ISBN 0-316-73204-4.
- —— (2009). No Invitation Required: The Pelham Cottage Years. London: Weidenfeld & Nicolson. ISBN 978-0-297-85451-7.
