= 5 Hertford Street =

Private members' club in Mayfair, London

Coordinates: 51.5063°N 0.1475°W

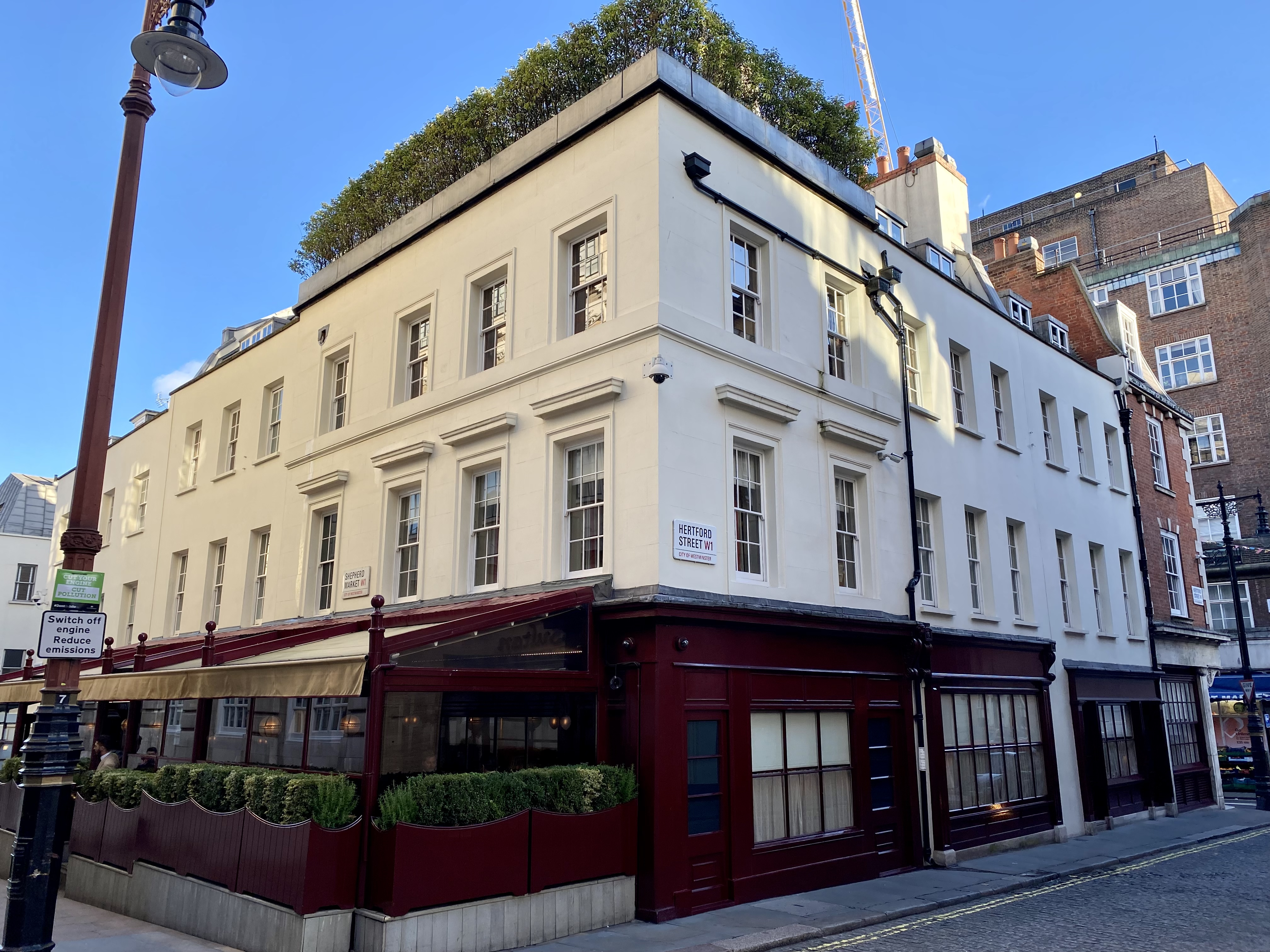
- Abbreviation: 5H
- Formation: 2012
- Locations: 2–5 Hertford Street, Mayfair, London, W1J 7RB (club); 6B Hertford Street, Mayfair, London, W1J 7RQ (office)
- Owner: Robin Birley
- Designer: Rifat Ozbek
- Website: www.5hertfordstreet.com

5 Hertford Street (5HS) is a private members' club in Mayfair, London, which was described in a 2017 Observer article as London's most secretive club. It has annual membership costs of £3,500 and is owned by the English businessman Robin Birley. Its interior design is by the Turkish-born fashion designer Rifat Ozbek.

The club is known to have been frequented by figures including Harry Styles, Margot Robbie, Mick Jagger, Lupita Nyong'o, George and Amal Clooney, Leonardo DiCaprio, the Prince of Wales and Princess Eugenie. It is where Meghan Markle had drinks the night before she met Prince Harry. Celia Walden wrote that 5 Hertford Street was the location of the first date of Markle and Prince Harry. Later it was said in Finding Freedom, a biography that includes contributions from Markle, that the first date of the couple was at Soho House on Dean Street.

Birley, who has been described as "a committed Leaver", "ushered into membership" a number of politicians; political figures that have been associated with the club include Priti Patel, Nigel Farage, Michael Gove, David Cameron, Arron Banks and Liz Truss. It is located on the corner of Shepherd Market and has its own cigar shop and a downstairs nightclub, Loulou's.

In May 2019, protesters gathered outside the club after it announced that it was outsourcing management of its kitchen porters to a private company, putting staff at risk of reduced pay.
