= Mark Birley =

British entrepreneur (1930–2007)

- Born: Marcus Oswald Hornby Lecky Birley; 29 May 1930; Marylebone, London, England
- Died: 24 August 2007 (aged 77); London, England
- Education: University College, Oxford
- Known for: Entrepreneur
- Spouse: Lady Annabel Vane-Tempest-Stewart (m. 1954; div. 1975)
- Children: Rupert Birley; Robin Birley; India Jane Birley
- Parent(s): Sir Oswald Birley; Rhoda Vava Mary Lecky Pike
- Relatives: Maxime de la Falaise (sister); Hugh Hornby Birley (2x great-grandfather)

Marcus Oswald Hornby Lecky Birley (29 May 1930 – 24 August 2007) was a British entrepreneur known for his investments in the hospitality industry.

== Early life ==
Mark Birley was the son of Sir Oswald Birley, the royal and society portrait painter, and the artist and gardener Rhoda Vava Mary Lecky Pike. His sister, Maxime de la Falaise, became a noted fashion model of the 1950s; Maxime's daughter, Loulou de la Falaise, was a muse to the fashion designer Yves Saint Laurent.

He was educated at Eton where he excelled at drawing. After doing his National Service he went up to University College, Oxford, to read Philosophy, Politics and Economics but he left after failing his first year exams. He then started working as a copywriter for J. Walter Thompson.

== Career ==
In 1963, Birley founded Annabel's at Berkeley Square in the Mayfair district in central London. The club was named for his wife, the former Lady Annabel Vane-Tempest-Stewart, and it was the first of its kind: a member-only nightclub that catered to an exclusive clientele, including the Prince of Wales.

In 1972, Birley opened Mark's Club and continued to expand his portfolio in the restaurant, nightclub and hotel business. He became the owner of the Annabel's Group, which includes Mark Birley Holdings Limited. In 1979 Birley opened Harry's Bar on South Audley Street in Mayfair, which became noted for its Italian cuisine. He launched a men's fragrance line, Mark Birley for Men, in 1996, in collaboration with the perfumers Frédéric Malle and Pierre Bourdon. Birley also designed the former family offices of Peter Palumbo, Baron Palumbo, in the City of London into a member's club, The Walbrook Club, which opened in 2000.

In 1989 Birley established the Bath & Racquets Club on Brook's Mews.

== Personal life ==
On 10 March 1954, he married Lady Annabel Vane-Tempest-Stewart, daughter of the 8th Marquess of Londonderry. Annabel Birley became the mistress of Birley's former friend Sir James Goldsmith, and gave birth to two of Goldsmith's children while she was still married to, but separated from, Birley. The Birleys divorced in 1975. Mark and Annabel had three children:

- Rupert Birley (1955–1986; presumed dead), who disappeared whilst working in Togo, West Africa in 1986.
- Robin Marcus Birley (born 1958)
- India Jane Birley (born 1961), who married Jonty Colchester (div. 1985). She later married Francis Pike.

As a child Birley's son Robin was mauled and badly scarred for life by a tiger at the private zoo of family friend John Aspinall (1926–2000). In 1986, Birley's other son, Rupert, disappeared in Togo and was never found. He is assumed to be deceased.

In his last years, Birley himself was disabled and needed to use a wheelchair. For a time, he turned over the reins of his businesses to his two surviving children. In 2006, however, Birley dismissed his son Robin and returned to the helm of his empire, which until his death he ran with his daughter India Jane.

Birley lived at Thurloe Lodge in South Kensington for 30 years. India Jane sold Thurloe Lodge in 2011 for £17 million. An auction of 500 of Birley's possessions from the house was held at Sotheby's in March 2013. The auction realised £3.85 million.

== Death ==
He died on 24 August 2007, aged 77, following a stroke. His memorial service was held at St Paul's Church in Knightsbridge.

== Sources ==
- Annabel's: A tale of love, snobbery, revenge... and some jolly good cocktails by Liz Hoggard, The Independent, 15 October 2006
- Orth, Maureen. "Hurly Birley". Vanity Fair. p. 152 (6 pages in online edition). 1 February 2008. ISSN 0733-8899. Retrieved 30 August 2009.
