= Mark's Club =

Coordinates: 51.508354°N 0.145920°W

- Interactive map of Mark's Club

Restaurant information
- Established: 1972
- Location: 46 Charles Street, Mayfair, London, United Kingdom

Mark's Club is a private members' club and restaurant in Mayfair, London, UK. Established in 1972, it has hosted many fashion events and been patronised by members of the British establishment.

== Location ==
The club is located in a townhouse at 46 Charles Street in Mayfair, London, which runs from Waverton Street to Berkeley Square. It is near the location of what was Annabel's, a private members' nightclub and opposite The Only Running Footman public house.

== History ==
The club was opened by Mark Birley in 1972 and acquired by Richard Caring in 2007. Since 2014, Caring has co-owned the club with Peter Dubens and Charles Price (son of the late Ambassador Charles H. Price II). Howard Barclay, Sir Frederick Barclay's son, serves on its executive committee. Its interior was redecorated by Tino Zervudachi in 2015.

The club has hosted many fashion events. In February 2012, Belstaff held their relaunch party there and in June 2014, Marin Hopper launched her fashion line, Hayward Luxury, there as well. Several months later, in October 2014, fashion designer Vivienne Westwood launched her autobiography at Mark's. In February 2015, Moda Operandi organised a dinner there as did actress Gwyneth Paltrow, for her lifestyle company, Goop.

The restaurant serves English cuisine. The head chef is Ben Hughes. Patrons include members of the British establishment. In 2007, Princess Michael of Kent stated that she had had meals at the club since it opened. In May 2015, British Prime Minister David Cameron, his wife, Samantha Cameron and Chancellor George Osborne, dined at the club shortly after the general election.
