= Lambton =

Lambton is the name of several places and people:

== People ==
- Viscount Lambton, a title in the Peerage of the United Kingdom associated with the Earls of Durham
- Anne Lambton (born 1954), an actress
- Antony Lambton (1922–2006), formerly 6th Earl of Durham and later claimed Viscount Lambton, disclaimed his earldom under the terms of the Peerage Act 1963
- Edward Lambton, 7th Earl of Durham (born 1961), or Ned Lambton, is the current Earl of Durham
- Frederick Lambton, 4th Earl of Durham (1855–1929), a British politician
- George Lambton, 2nd Earl of Durham (1828–1879), a British peer
- Hedworth Lambton (1856–1929), a British naval officer, changed his name to Hedworth Meux in 1910 for inheritance purposes
- John Lambton (British Army officer) (1710–1794), a British army officer and Member of Parliament
- John Lambton, 1st Earl of Durham (1792–1840), a British colonial administrator
- John Lambton, 3rd Earl of Durham (1855–1928), a British peer
- John Lambton, 5th Earl of Durham (1884–1970), a British peer
- Lucinda Lambton, writer, photographer and broadcaster
- William Henry Lambton (1764–1797), a British Member of Parliament
- William Lambton (c.1756–1823), surveyor

== Places ==
=== Australia ===
- Lambton, New South Wales, a suburb in Newcastle, New South Wales
- New Lambton, New South Wales, a suburb in Newcastle, New South Wales

=== Canada ===
- Lambton County, Ontario
  - Lambton (federal electoral district), a former Federal riding that encompassed Lambton County
  - Lambton (provincial electoral district), a former Provincial riding
- Lambton College, Sarnia (Lambton County), Ontario
- Lambton Neighbourhood, Toronto, neighbourhood in Toronto
- Lambton, Québec, a municipality in Québec

=== New Zealand ===
- Lambton Harbour, one of the arms of Wellington Harbour
- Lambton Quay, Wellington, one of the main streets of Wellington
- Lambton Station, also known as Pipitea Point Railway Station, Wellington

=== United Kingdom ===
- Lambton, Tyne and Wear, a village in Washington, Tyne and Wear, Sunderland, England
- Lambton Castle, a stately home near Chester-le-Street in County Durham, England
- New Lambton, County Durham, a village in England

== Ships ==
- Lambton, a New Zealand Company cutter dispatched to New Zealand in 1825 under Captain James Herd
- SS Lambton, a lighthouse tender that operated for the Canadian government on the Great Lakes in the early 20th century

== See also ==
- Lampton
