= John Lambton =

John Lambton may refer to:

- John Lambton (British Army officer) (1710–1794), British Army officer and politician
- John Lambton, 1st Earl of Durham (1792–1840), British politician and colonial administrator
- John Lambton, 3rd Earl of Durham (1855–1928), British peer
- John Lambton, 5th Earl of Durham (1884–1970), British peer
