= Trinity School (Carlisle) =

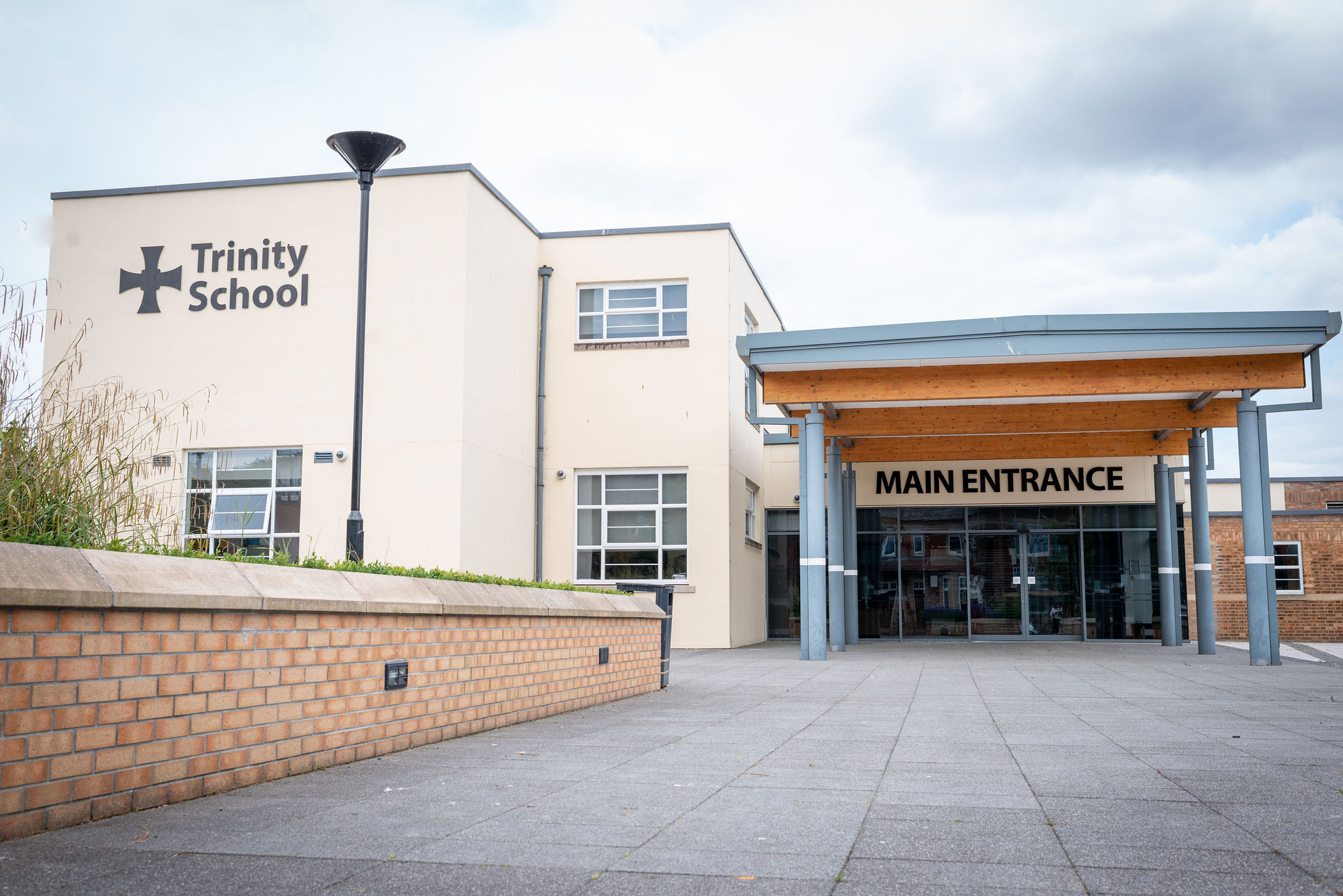
- Trinity School - Main Reception

Location
- Strand Road; Carlisle, Cumbria, CA1 1JB; England; 54°53′47″N 2°55′54″W

Information
- Former name: Carlisle Grammar School
- Type: Academy
- Motto: Standards, Responsibility, Opportunity....for All
- Religious affiliation: Church of England
- Established: 1968
- Local authority: Cumberland Council
- Oversight: Diocese of Carlisle
- Trust: Trinity School, A Church of England Academy
- Department for Education URN: 137369 Tables
- Ofsted: Reports
- Chairman of Governors: Brian Armstrong
- Head teacher: David Samson
- Gender: Mixed
- Age range: 11–18
- Enrolment: 1,682 (2018)
- Capacity: 1,500
- Colour: black yellow
- Website: www.trinity.cumbria.sch.uk

Trinity School (formerly Carlisle Grammar School) is an 11–18 coeducational comprehensive secondary school and sixth form with academy status in Carlisle, Cumbria, England. It is a Church of England school with strong links to Carlisle Cathedral.

== History ==
In 685 AD St Cuthbert, Bishop of Lindisfarne, visited Carlisle and founded both a school and a church. For the next 900 years the school continued around the grounds of the cathedral.

In 1545 Lancelot Salkeld, The Dean and Head of Chapter of Carlisle Cathedral took on responsibility for the school in the Cathedral close. The cathedral was rededicated to the Holy and Undivided Trinity. The school occupied buildings on West Walls, some of which are part of the diocesan offices to this day.

=== Grammar school ===
In 1883 it became Carlisle Grammar School and moved to Strand Road, into what is now the Carliol Building of the school, housing the Sixth Form Centre. Since that time, governors continue to be appointed by the Cathedral Foundation. The analogous girls' school was Carlisle County School for Girls, which became St Aidan's County High School.

=== Comprehensive ===
As the movement towards comprehensive schools took shape, in 1968 the grammar school amalgamated with two local schools, the Margaret Sewell School (for girls) and the Creighton School (for boys), to become Trinity School, a Church of England comprehensive school, with all of the sites along Strand Road.

In the 1990s, Trinity School became grant-maintained, until 1999 when it became a Church of England Voluntary Aided School.

In 1998 the school was awarded Specialist School status and was designated as a Language College.

Recent developments include the Uganda Project, the USA Exchange Scheme, and overseas visits and links.

The school became a Church of England converter academy in September 2011.

== Facilities ==
A rebuilding scheme of the 11-16 school was completed in September 2012 at a reported cost of £20 million, of which £1.8 million was spent on a new sports hall.

=== The Armstrong Building ===
This new building was opened in 2011 as the new Science and Technology centre of the school, the major part of the rebuild programme. It was officially opened by the Duke of Kent in October 2012.

=== The Chapman Library ===
This purpose-built Library is the main school library. It was opened in 2001 and is named after the former Chair of Governors, Canon Rex Chapman. It has a stock of over 10,000 items including fiction, non-fiction and reference books, as well as networked computers.

== Ofsted and academic performance ==
In 2009 the Ofsted inspection concluded, "Trinity School provides its students with a good education... the quality of the teaching and learning is good". In its February 2012 inspection, Trinity was judged to be "good" in all categories.

=== Former Masters ===
- Cyril Broom, Headmaster of Emanuel School from 1928 to 1953 (taught classics from 1911 to 1913)
- Victor Ehrenberg (taught classics in 1941)
- John Howard
- H. J. R. Murray (in the late 1890s)

=== Former Headteachers ===
- Ambrose Wilson (1880–1885)
- Edmund Arblaster (1885-1890)
- Frederick Hendy (1895-1901)
- Charles Padel (1912-1932)
- Victor Dunstan (1932-1960)
- Brendan Bushby (1960-1965)
- DJW Williams (1965–1977)
- J Thorley (1977–1982)
- BD Dexter (1982–1997)
- MA Gibbons (1997–2001)
- J Williamson (2001-2002)
- AP Mottershead (2002–2014)
- D Kay & S Johnston (2014–2019)
- Jo Hawkins (2019-2023)
- D Samson (2023-current)

== Notable alumni ==
=== Carlisle Grammar School ===
- Gordon Adam — former Labour MEP for Northumbria.
- Keith Batey — World War II codebreaker.
- David Beattie — venture capitalist with Grosvenor Development Capital.
- Roger Bolton — Radio 4 presenter.
- Joseph Dacre Carlyle — Arabic scholar.
- Thomas Heathfield Carrick — painter.
- Sir Ian Carruthers — NHS executive, acting Chief Executive of the NHS in 2006.
- Mandell Creighton – historian and Bishop of London
- Hunter Davies — Beatles biographer, married to Margaret Forster (also from Carlisle).
- William Farish — chemist.
- Sir Brian Fender — Chairman of BTG from 2003 to 2008 and former Vice-Chancellor of Keele University.
- William Frankland, MBE — allergist.
- George MacDonald Fraser OBE (1925-2008) — screenplay writer.
- Prof Michael Goodfellow OBE
- Reginald Hill — TV writer of Dalziel and Pascoe.
- Rt Rev William Warren Hunt — Bishop of Repton from 1965 to 1977.
- Ifor James — musician.
- Sir John Laing CBE — civil engineer, who developed John Laing plc.
- Roger Liddle, Baron Liddle — Labour Party adviser.
- Ronald McLean F.R.I.C.S. - President Waddington McLean & Co. - Canada's foremost fine art auction house.
- Rt Rev Robert Nelson — Bishop of Middleton from 1958 to 1959.
- Sir John Fearns Nicoll — Governor of Singapore from 1952 to 1955.
- Gordon Preston — mathematician.
- Herbert Ponting (briefly) — photographer.
- Derek Ratcliffe — conservationist.
- Eric Robson — Gardeners' Question Time host.
- Allen J Scott — distinguished Professor, Depts of Geography and Public Policy, University of California, Los Angeles (UCLA).
- Thomas Story — English Quaker convert and friend of William Penn.
- Sir Godfrey Tearle (briefly) — actor.
- Charles Terrot — Scottish Episcopalian minister, theologian and mathematician.
- Rt Rev John Thomas — Bishop of Rochester from 1774 to 1793.
- Neil Turner — Labour MP for Wigan from 1999 to 2010.
- Eric Wetherell (1925-2021), conductor, composer and author

=== Trinity School ===
- Lee Brennan — former member of 911.
- Roxanne Pallett — actress from Emmerdale.
- Andrew Johnston — treble singer on Britain's Got Talent.
- Lisa McGrillis - actress Inspector George Gently (2017), Sex Education (2023), Rivals (2024).
- Julie Minns — Labour MP for Carlisle from 2024.

== See also ==
- List of the oldest schools in the United Kingdom
