= Rowland Burdon (Sedgefield MP) =

English landowner (1857–1944)

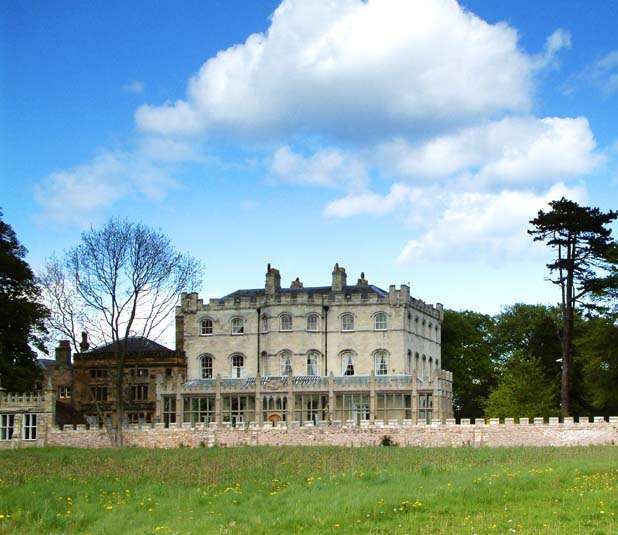
Burdon's seat in County Durham: the Castle, Castle Eden.

Colonel Rowland Burdon, VD, DL, JP (19 June 1857 – 1 August 1944) was an English landowner and Conservative Party politician from County Durham. He sat in the House of Commons from 1918 to 1922.

== Early life and family ==
Burdon was the son of the Reverend John Burdon, from Castle Eden in County Durham. He was educated at Repton School and University College, Oxford. In 1887, he married Mary Arundell, the daughter of Wyndham Slade of Monty's Court in Taunton, Somerset.

== Career ==
Burdon was Lord of the manor of both Castle Eden and Little Eden, and lived at the Castle, Castle Eden. He was appointed a deputy lieutenant of County Durham in 1900, and served as High Sheriff of Durham in 1907. He was also a Justice of the Peace (JP) for County Durham, and after serving as lieutenant colonel commanding the 1st Volunteer Battalion of the Durham Light Infantry he became Honorary Colonel of the 5th Battalion in 1911. He was awarded the Volunteer Decoration in 1898.

At the December 1910 general election, Burdon unsuccessfully contested South East Durham, a constituency which had been held by Liberal Unionists from 1886 to January 1910, when the sitting Liberal Unionist Frederick Lambton was defeated by the Liberal Party candidate Evan Hayward. Burdon had been nominated for the contest by Lord Londonderry, who told the selection meeting of the South East Durham Conservative Association that the candidate should be "well-known, popular, and living in the constituency". Burdon accepted the nomination as a duty in a time of crisis, asserting that "a man who shirked his duty was as much a traitor to his country as the man who betrayed it in a military sense". The Times described him as "a strong local candidate" who "may possibly recover Mr. Lambton's former seat", but the swing of 3.6% was not enough. Burdon halved Hayward's majority, to 1,182 votes (7.8% of the total), down from 15% in January 1910.

He was elected at the 1918 general election as the Member of Parliament (MP) for the Sedgefield division of County Durham. Standing as a Coalition Unionist (a supporter of the coalition government led by David Lloyd George), he won the newly created seat in a three-way contest, with a majority of 826 votes over the second-placed candidate, Labour Party candidate John Herriotts. He did not contest the 1922 general election, when Herriotts won the seat for Labour.

Burdon died at Castle Eden on 1 August 1944, aged 87. In October 1947 his daughter Mrs Sclater-Booth presented the Castle Eden Vase to the British Museum, in his memory. The glass vase was a 6th-century Anglo-Saxon "claw beaker" which had been found by a labourer working on a hedge on the Castle Eden estate in about 1775, in the time of his great-grandfather Rowland Burdon MP.

Parliament of the United Kingdom
| New constituency | Member of Parliament for Sedgefield; 1918 – 1922 | Succeeded by John Herriotts |
