= 1898 South East Durham by-election =

UK parliamentary by-election

The 1898 South East Durham by-election was held on 3 February 1898 after the death of the incumbent Liberal Unionist MP, Sir Henry Marshman Havelock-Allan. The seat was gained by the Liberal candidate, Joseph Richardson, although the unsuccessful Liberal Unionist candidate Frederick William Lambton would regain the seat for the Liberal Unionists in the 1900 general election.

Richardson

South East Durham by-election, 1898
Party	Candidate	Votes	%	±%
Liberal	Joseph Richardson	6,286	51.1	+1.6
Liberal Unionist	Frederick William Lambton	6,011	48.9	−1.6
Majority		275	2.2	N/A
Turnout		12,297	82.8	+2.3
Liberal gain from Liberal Unionist		Swing	+1.6	
