= Charles Roberts Howitt =

British colonial administrator (1894–1969)

Charles Roberts Howitt CMG

British Adviser, Perlis
- In office 1935–1937
- Preceded by: Oswald Eric Venables
- Succeeded by: Christopher William Dawson

Personal details
- Born: 5 November 1894 Cumberland
- Died: 23 December 1969 (aged 75)
- Spouse: E. Vera
- Children: 2 daughters
- Education: Queen's College, Oxford
- Occupation: Colonial administrator

Charles Roberts Howitt CMG (5 November 1894 – 23 December 1969) was a British colonial administrator who served in Malaya.

== Early life and education ==
Howitt was born on 5 November 1894 in Cumberland. He was educated at Carlisle Grammar School, and Queen's College, Oxford, where in 1920 he received his BA.

== Career ==
During the First World War, Howitt served with the Royal Fusiliers (1914–1916) as second lieutenant, and the Border Regiment (1916–1918).

In 1920, after graduating, he joined the Malay civil service as a cadet, and was posted to Johore where he served as Land Officer (1920), Second Class Magistrate (1921–22), Collector of Land revenue (1922), and Assistant Adviser (1924). From 1925 to 1935, he served in Singapore, Malacca and Penang where he worked in various posts.

From 1935 to 1937, he was British Adviser in Perlis. In 1938, he was appointed Malayan Establishment Officer, and in 1940, was appointed Under-Secretary of the Straits Settlements. In 1948, he was Acting Chief Secretary and acted as spokesman for the government on the outbreak of the Malayan Emergency. In 1954, he was appointed Chairman of the Public Service Board, Malaya, and three years later served on the Public Services Commission and the Judicial and Legal Commission, Malaya. He retired in 1963.

== Personal life ==
Howitt married E. Vera in 1920, and they had two daughters.

== Honours ==
Howitt was appointed Companion of the Order of St Michael and St George (CMG) in the 1957 Birthday Honours.
