= Gordon Adam =

British engineer

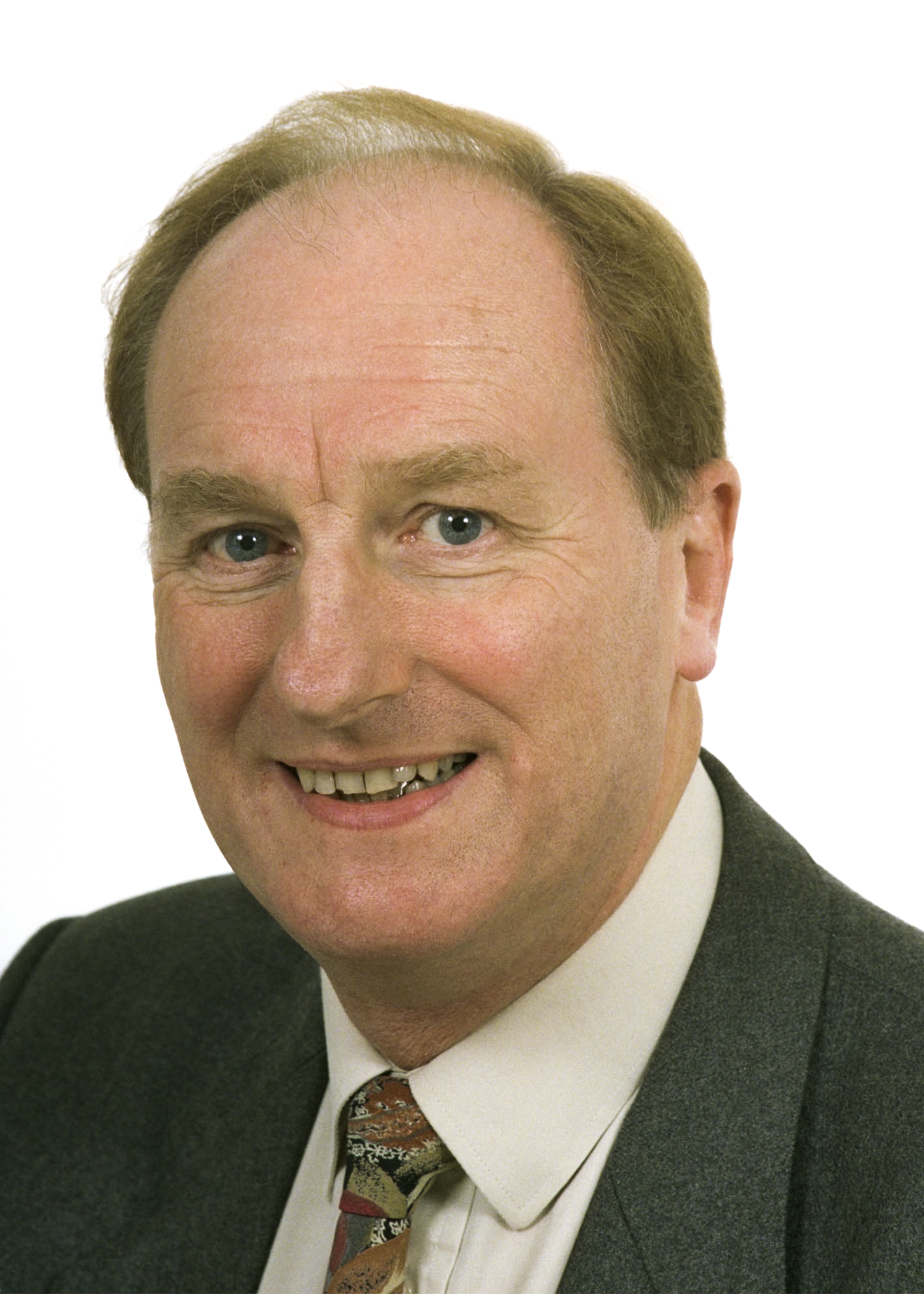
- Adam in 1994

Member of the European Parliament for North East England
- In office December 1999 – 10 June 2004
- Preceded by: Alan Donnelly
- Succeeded by: Fiona Hall

Member of the European Parliament for Northumbria
- In office 7 June 1979 – 10 June 1999
- Preceded by: Constituency established
- Succeeded by: Constituency dissolved

North Tyneside Councillor for Monkseaton South ward
- In office 1 April 1974 – 7 June 1979

Personal details
- Born: Gordon Johnston Adam; 28 March 1934 (age 92)
- Party: Labour
- Education: University of Leeds

Gordon Johnston Adam (born 28 March 1934) is a British mining engineer and Labour Party politician. With one brief interruption, he served as a Member of the European Parliament (MEP) for 25 years.

== Training and career ==
Adam went to Carlisle Grammar School and the University of Leeds, from which he obtained a Bachelor of Science and Doctor of Philosophy degrees. After becoming a Member of the Institution of Mechanical Engineers in 1953, he joined the National Coal Board as a mining engineer in 1959. Adam later became a Charted Engineer member of the Institute of Materials, Minerals and Mining.

== Labour Party activity ==
He joined the Labour Party and in 1963 became Chairman of Berwick-upon-Tweed Constituency Labour Party, and he was co-opted as a member of Northumberland County Council Education Committee in 1964. At the 1966 general election, Adam was the Labour Party candidate for the Tynemouth constituency. He succeeded in cutting the Conservative majority from 7,448 to 3,396. In 1971 Adam was elected to Whitley Bay Borough Council; when that council was succeeded by North Tyneside Borough Council in 1973, Adam was elected to the new body and became its first chairman and Mayor for the year 1974–1975.

== Berwick byelection ==
In August 1973, he was chosen to fight the byelection in Berwick-upon-Tweed caused by the resignation of Lord Lambton, and decided to focus on the issues of housing and prices. The Times Diary noted that Labour had drafted 13 professionals in to lead their campaign but described Adam as "a charm-free technocrat". Adam saw Labour overtaken by the Liberal Party who narrowly won the seat; he took comfort that the Labour vote had held firm.

== North Tyneside Councillor ==
Adam fought the same constituency again in the February 1974 general election, but saw the Labour vote fall to 4,326 which was about half what it had been in 1970. From 1975 he became Deputy Leader of North Tyneside Borough Council, and he was named to the Northern Economic Planning Council from 1974. As Deputy Leader of North Tyneside he indicated that the council would aim to comply with the demands of Peter Shore, Secretary of State for the Environment, to restrain spending. He served on the Northern Arts General Council from 1975 to 1977, and was appointed to the Whitley Bay Playhouse Theatre Trust in 1975; he was Chairman of the Trust from 1975 to 1980.

== European Parliament ==
At the 1979 election to the European Parliament, Adam stood as Labour Party candidate in Northumbria. This was one of the safest seats for Labour and Adam was easily elected. In June 1980 he lauded events in Zimbabwe which had shown how real democracy had triumphed in the end, and urged the government of South Africa to take the same course. In June 1981 he presented a report on behalf of the Committee on Energy and Research which called for the development of a computer translation system.

== Attitude to the EEC ==
In 1983 he was chosen to head an inquiry into how the United Kingdom proposed to spend its budget rebate on energy projects. Adam was prepared to support the Labour Party policy of withdrawal from the EEC in public but felt that party policy failed to take account of practicalities: he was quoted in early 1982 as saying that his constituents were more interested in learning what would happen to the sheepmeat regime. However, in the 1984 election, the Conservatives claimed that a reading of Adam's election literature identified him as a supporter of British membership.

Following successful re-election Adam became vice-chairman of the Energy, Research and Technology Committee of the European Parliament. He kept up his local connections with the arts, being a member of the Board of Newcastle Free Festival from 1989 to 1999 (and Chairman from 1992). He was also a member of the Board of the Northern Stage Company from 1989 to 2001. At the 1992 general election, he again fought Berwick-upon-Tweed; this time he succeeded in increasing the Labour vote by 5.4% compared with the previous election.

== Pit closures ==
Adam managed to persuade the European Parliament to commission an independent investigation of the British government's decision to close 31 coal mines after the closure was announced in 1992. The investigation was significant because the European Commission needed to give approval for part of the closure programme. Early in 1995 Adam signed a joint letter in defence of Clause IV and opposing Tony Blair's attempt to get rid of it.

== 1999 election ==
In the selections for the 1999 European election, Adam was placed as fourth on the Labour Party's list for the North East region, a position which made it almost impossible for him to be elected. As expected he lost his seat when the Labour Party won only three seats in the region. He wrote to the local newspaper after the election to thank those who had worked with him. He retired to give more time to his work as Chairman of the Northern Energy Initiative, a post he had occupied since 1995.

== Return ==
However, in December 1999 it was surprisingly announced that Alan Donnelly was resigning his seat in the European Parliament. Donnelly was the Leader of the Labour group and only 42 at the time; the Labour Party denied that there was an impending scandal. Under the European Parliament electoral system, Adam became first in line to replace him. Adam duly returned to the European Parliament after a gap of six months.

== Foot and Mouth disease ==
In December 2001 Adam caused a stir when he criticised the calls from Ireland for the Sellafield nuclear recycling plant to be closed. He pointed to figures from the Radiological Protection Institute of Ireland which found that Sellafield was responsible for only one per cent. of radioactivity in Ireland, and went on to "award the star prize for political humbuggery to the Irish, to the inhabitants of the Emerald Isle". He became the Labour group agriculture spokesman and was critical of the group of Welsh farmers who had given evidence during an inquiry into the outbreak of foot and mouth disease, saying they "might be a bit biased". When the eventual report was highly critical of the British government, Adam abstained rather than support it, describing the report as inaccurate.

== Mayoral candidate ==
When the directly elected Mayor of North Tyneside resigned in 2003, forcing a byelection for the Mayoralty, Adam was chosen as the Labour candidate. He was defeated by Linda Arkley who secured a majority of 4,861.

== Allowances ==
In April 2004 Austrian MEP Hans-Peter Martin was attempting to expose questionable practices in European Parliament allowances. Martin filmed Adam signing the attendance book for a Friday session of the European Parliament, thereby claiming a daily allowance, before immediately leaving. Martin claimed that Adam tried to grab his video camera, knocking Martin off his feet and on to the floor. Adam denied the claim and attacked Martin's methods.

== Retirement ==
Adam retired from the European Parliament at the 2004 election. He supported the move for an elected regional authority in the devolution referendum later that year, recalling his first election in 1964 when he called for investment in the region's roads; Adam believed a regional authority would unlock investment held back by Whitehall. In 2006 he criticised the group of Labour MPs who had called for Tony Blair to resign the Labour Party leadership, warning that the electorate would not re-elect "a squabbling, divided party".

In 2004 Adam was appointed to the Board of the South Tyneside Groundwork Trust. He is also President of the Felling Male Voice Choir.
