= Ambrose Wilson =

Australian priest and school headmaster

Ambrose John Wilson (1853 – 27 August 1929) was a priest and head-master of schools in Cape Colony, England and Australia.

Wilson was the son of Joseph William Wilson of Slenley, Surrey, and was born at Birmingham, England. He was educated at Merchant Taylors' School in London, and having secured a scholarship at St. John's College, Oxford, he took a second-class in Classical Moderations in 1873, and a first-class in Litteræ Humaniores in 1875. He graduated B.A. in 1876, and was elected a Fellow of Queen's College, Oxford, an appointment which he retained till 1881. In the same year he became lecturer of Queen's and St. John's Colleges simultaneously, and in December was ordained deacon by the Bishop of Oxford.

In 1877 he was appointed tutor of St. John's, which position he resigned, and the next year became classical tutor at the Diocesan College at Rondesbosch, in Cape Colony, and head master of St. Mark's Grammar School, George. In March of that year he was ordained priest by the Bishop of Cape Town, and took his degree of M.A. at Oxford in absence. In 1879 he was appointed Classical Examiner in the University of Cape Town, which conferred on him the honorary degree of M.A. In 1880, Wilson returned to England, and accepted the head-mastership of the Carlisle Grammar School, a post which he held till 1885, when he was appointed to the position as head master of the Melbourne Church of England Grammar School. In 1882 he took the Oxford degree of B.D., and in 1885 had that of D.D. conferred on him.

Wilson was headmaster of Lancing College 1895-1901, and was appointed rector of Tackley, Oxfordshire, in early 1902.

Wilson was married at St. Margaret's Bay, near Dover, on 3 September 1880, to Miss Julia Mary Lawrence.

Wilson died in London on 27 August 1929.
