= Seaham (constituency) =

Parliamentary constituency in the United Kingdom, 1918–1950

- Former county constituency for the House of Commons

1918–1950
- Seats: one
- Created from: South East Durham and part of Houghton-le-Spring
- Replaced by: Easington and Houghton-le-Spring

Seaham was a parliamentary constituency, in existence between 1918 and 1950, of the House of Commons of the Parliament of the United Kingdom. It elected one Member of Parliament (MP) by the first past the post system of election.

== History ==
Seaham was created under the Representation of the People Act 1918 for the 1918 general election, comprising northern parts of the abolished South Eastern Division of Durham. The town of Seaham itself was transferred from Houghton-le-Spring.

It was abolished for the 1950 general election under the Representation of the People Act 1948, with the bulk of its area moved into the new constituency of Easington. The expanded Urban District of Seaham Harbour (now incorporating Seaham) was transferred back to Houghton-le-Spring.

== Boundaries ==
- The Urban District of Seaham Harbour; and
- the Rural District of Easington.

== Political history ==
The history of this constituency, which incorporated a lot of the mining area of the eastern part of County Durham around Seaham, is of strong Labour Party support.

In the so-called "coupon election" of 1918, Major Evan Hayward was issued a Coalition 'coupon'. However, he repudiated the 'coupon' and stood as a Liberal and was elected. At the following general election, in 1922, Sidney Webb, an early socialist and author of the Labour Party's then-new constitution, was returned. Webb was easily re-elected in 1923 and 1924. He was subsequently raised to the peerage; his successor as parliamentary candidate was Ramsay MacDonald, the leader of the Labour Party at the time. At the 1929 general election MacDonald won, and for the second time became Prime Minister presiding over a minority Labour administration.

The economic crisis after 1929 led to a political crisis in mid-1931, and MacDonald failed to secure agreement in cabinet for his proposed cuts in outdoor relief for the unemployed. MacDonald went to see King George V, who persuaded him to form a National Government. In the general election that followed, MacDonald stood in Seaham as National Labour and was comfortably elected, and continued to serve as a Prime Minister of a National Government that was predominantly Conservative-supported.

MacDonald retired as prime minister in 1935 but remained in the Cabinet. In the general election of 1935 he was resoundingly defeated at Seaham by Emanuel Shinwell, the Labour Party candidate. Shinwell was re-elected in the Labour landslide at the 1945 election and subsequently served as MP for the successor constituency of Easington until 1970.

== Members of Parliament ==
Election	Member	Party
1918	Evan Hayward	Liberal
1922	Sidney Webb	Labour
1929	Ramsay MacDonald	Labour
1931	Ramsay MacDonald	National Labour
1935	Manny Shinwell	Labour
1950	constituency abolished	

== Elections ==
=== Elections in the 1910s ===
General election 1918: Seaham
Party	Candidate	Votes	%	±%
Liberal	Evan Hayward	12,754	58.7	
Labour	Jack Lawson	8,988	41.3	
Majority		3,766	17.4	
Turnout		21,742	59.2	
Liberal win (new seat)				

- Hayward had been issued with the "coalition coupon", but repudiated it.

=== Elections in the 1920s ===
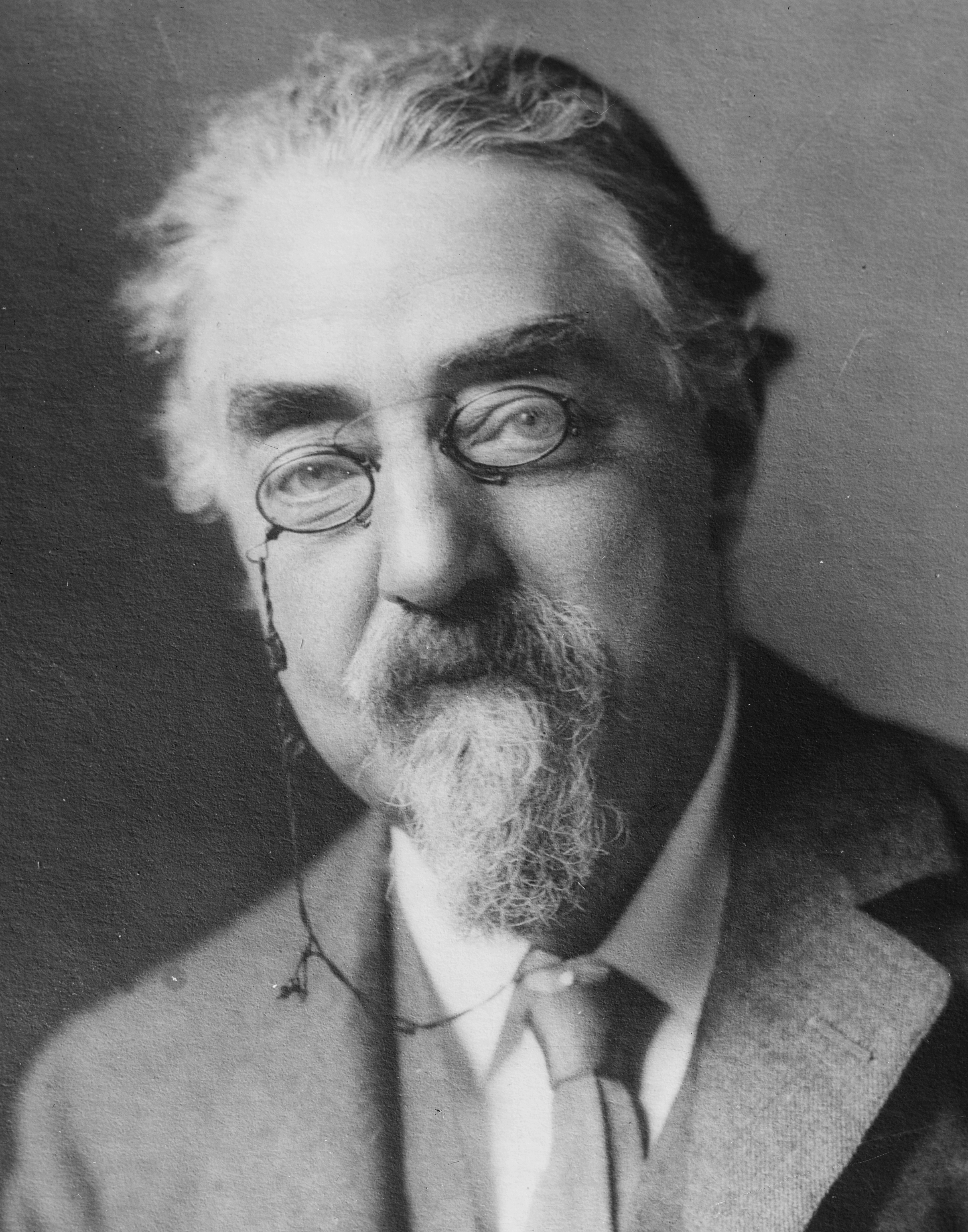
Webb

General election 1922: Seaham
Party	Candidate	Votes	%	±%
Labour	Sidney Webb	20,203	59.9	+18.6
Unionist	Thomas Andrews Bradford	8,315	24.6	New
Liberal	Evan Hayward	5,247	15.5	−43.2
Majority		11,888	35.3	N/A
Turnout		33,765	81.9	+22.7
Labour gain from Liberal		Swing		

General election 1923: Seaham
Party	Candidate	Votes	%	±%
Labour	Sidney Webb	21,281	71.3	+11.4
Unionist	Ronald Ross	8,546	28.7	+4.1
Majority		12,735	42.6	+7.3
Turnout		29,827	71.3	−10.6
Labour hold		Swing	+3.6	

General election 1924: Seaham
Party	Candidate	Votes	%	±%
Labour	Sidney Webb	22,399	65.5	−5.8
Unionist	Ronald Ross	11,775	34.5	+5.8
Majority		10,624	31.0	−11.6
Turnout		34,174	78.8	+7.5
Labour hold		Swing	-5.8	

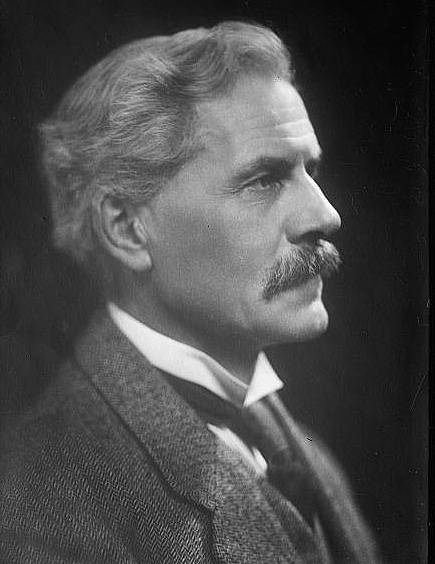
MacDonald

General election 1929: Seaham
Party	Candidate	Votes	%	±%
Labour	Ramsay MacDonald	35,615	72.5	+7.0
Unionist	William Arthur Fearnley-Whittingstall	6,821	13.9	−20.6
Liberal	Henry Augustus Haslam	5,266	10.7	New
Communist	Harry Pollitt	1,451	2.9	New
Majority		28,794	58.6	+27.6
Turnout		49,153	84.2	+5.4
Labour hold		Swing	+13.8	

=== Elections in the 1930s ===
General election 1931: Seaham
Party	Candidate	Votes	%	±%
National Labour	Ramsay MacDonald	28,978	55.0	−17.5
Labour	William Coxon	23,027	43.7	−28.8
Communist	George Lumley	677	1.3	−1.6
Majority		5,951	11.3	N/A
Turnout		52,682	86.7	+2.5
National Labour gain from Labour		Swing		

General election 1935: Seaham
Party	Candidate	Votes	%	±%
Labour	Manny Shinwell	38,380	68.2	+24.5
National Labour	Ramsay MacDonald	17,882	31.8	−23.2
Majority		20,498	36.4	N/A
Turnout		56,262	86.3	−0.4
Labour gain from National Labour		Swing	+23.8	

General Election 1939–40

Another General Election was required to take place before the end of 1940. The political parties had been making preparations for an election to take place and by the Autumn of 1939, the following candidates had been selected;

- Labour: Manny Shinwell
- Conservative:

=== Elections in the 1940s ===
General election 1945: Seaham
Party	Candidate	Votes	%	±%
Labour	Manny Shinwell	42,942	80.1	+11.9
Conservative	Maurice Macmillan	10,685	19.9	New
Majority		32,257	60.2	+23.8
Turnout		53,627	79.8	−6.5
Labour hold		Swing		

== See also ==
- History of parliamentary constituencies and boundaries in Durham

Parliament of the United Kingdom
Preceded by Bewdley	Constituency represented by the prime minister 1929–1935	Succeeded by Bewdley
