= South East Durham =

Parliamentary constituency in the United Kingdom, 1885–1918

- Former county constituency for the House of Commons

1885–1918
- Seats: one
- Created from: South Durham
- Replaced by: Seaham, Sedgefield

South East Durham was a county constituency represented in the House of Commons of the Parliament of the United Kingdom. It elected one Member of Parliament (MP) by the first past the post system of election between 1885 and 1918.

== History ==
=== Creation ===
The constituency was created by the Redistribution of Seats Act 1885, when the North Durham and South Durham county divisions were replaced by eight new single-member county constituencies. These were Barnard Castle, Bishop Auckland, Chester-le-Street, Houghton-le-Spring, Jarrow, Mid Durham, North West Durham and South East Durham. In addition there were seven County Durham borough constituencies.

=== Boundaries ===
- The Sessional Divisions of Castle Eden (exclusive of any part of the parish of Shadforth), Darlington, Seaham Harbour (part), Stockton-on-Tees, and West Hartlepool; and
- the Municipal Boroughs of Darlington, Hartlepool, and Stockton-on-Tees.

See map on Vision of Britain website.

NB: 1) Boundary Commission proposed name was "North Tees".

2) Included only non-resident freeholders in the parliamentary boroughs of Darlington, Stockton-on-Tees and The Hartlepools.

=== Abolition ===
The seat was abolished for the 1918 general election, when its contents were distributed as follows:

- northern areas, now part of the Rural District of Easington to the new constituency of Seaham; and
- southern areas, now part of the Rural Districts of Darlington, Hartlepool, Sedgefield and Stockton (including Billingham) to the new constituency of Sedgefield.

== Members of Parliament ==
Year	Member	Party
1885	Henry Havelock-Allan	Liberal
1886	Henry Havelock-Allan	Liberal Unionist
1892	Joseph Richardson	Liberal
1895	Henry Havelock-Allan	Liberal Unionist
1898 by-election	Joseph Richardson	Liberal
1900	Frederick Lambton	Liberal Unionist
Jan. 1910	Evan Hayward	Liberal
1918	constituency abolished	

== Election results ==
=== Elections in the 1880s ===
General election 1885: South East Durham
Party	Candidate	Votes	%	±%
Liberal	Henry Havelock-Allan	5,603	53.6	
Conservative	George Elliot	4,854	46.4	
Majority		749	7.2	
Turnout		10,457	79.4	
Registered electors		13,176		
Liberal win (new seat)				

General election 1886: South East Durham
Party	Candidate	Votes	%	±%
Liberal Unionist	Henry Havelock-Allan	4,984	55.2	+8.8
Liberal	Hugh Fenwick Boyd	4,045	44.8	−8.8
Majority		939	10.4	N/A
Turnout		9,029	68.5	−10.9
Registered electors		13,176		
Liberal Unionist gain from Liberal		Swing	+8.8	

=== Elections in the 1890s ===
Richardson

General election 1892: South East Durham
Party	Candidate	Votes	%	±%
Liberal	Joseph Richardson	5,560	50.7	+5.9
Liberal Unionist	Henry Havelock-Allan	5,396	49.3	−5.9
Majority		164	1.4	N/A
Turnout		10,956	77.2	+8.7
Registered electors		14,199		
Liberal gain from Liberal Unionist		Swing	+5.9	

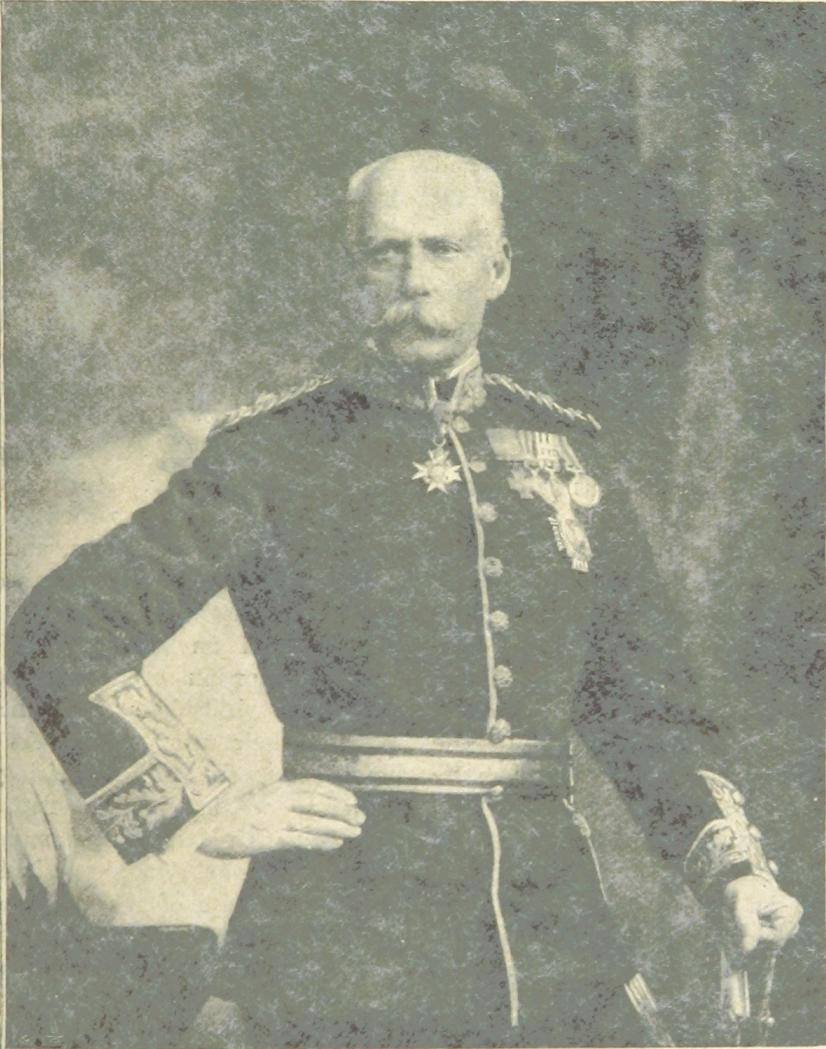
Havelock-Allan

General election 1895: South East Durham
Party	Candidate	Votes	%	±%
Liberal Unionist	Henry Havelock-Allan	5,978	50.5	+1.2
Liberal	Joseph Richardson	5,864	49.5	−1.2
Majority		114	1.0	N/A
Turnout		11,842	80.5	+3.3
Registered electors		14,702		
Liberal Unionist gain from Liberal		Swing	+1.2	

1898 South East Durham by-election
Party	Candidate	Votes	%	±%
Liberal	Joseph Richardson	6,286	51.1	+1.6
Liberal Unionist	Frederick Lambton	6,011	48.9	−1.6
Majority		275	2.2	N/A
Turnout		12,297	82.8	+2.3
Registered electors		14,853		
Liberal gain from Liberal Unionist		Swing	+1.6	

=== Elections in the 1900s ===
General election 1900: South East Durham
Party	Candidate	Votes	%	±%
Liberal Unionist	Frederick Lambton	6,198	52.9	+2.4
Liberal	Joseph Richardson	5,524	47.1	−2.4
Majority		674	5.8	+4.8
Turnout		11,722	79.1	−1.4
Registered electors		14,819		
Liberal Unionist hold		Swing	+2.4	

General election 1906: South East Durham
Party	Candidate	Votes	%	±%
Liberal Unionist	Frederick Lambton	Unopposed		
Liberal Unionist hold				

=== Elections in the 1910s ===
General election January 1910: South East Durham
Party	Candidate	Votes	%	±%
Liberal	Evan Hayward	9,298	57.5	New
Conservative	Frederick Lambton	6,860	42.5	N/A
Majority		2,438	15.0	N/A
Turnout		16,158	85.6	N/A
Registered electors		18,880		
Liberal gain from Liberal Unionist		Swing	N/A	

General election December 1910: South East Durham
Party	Candidate	Votes	%	±%
Liberal	Evan Hayward	8,203	53.9	−3.6
Conservative	Rowland Burdon	7,021	46.1	+3.6
Majority		1,182	7.8	−7.2
Turnout		15,224	80.6	−5.0
Registered electors		18,880		
Liberal hold		Swing	−3.6	

General Election 1914–15:

Another General Election was required to take place before the end of 1915. The political parties had been making preparations for an election to take place and by July 1914, the following candidates had been selected;

- Liberal: Evan Hayward
- Unionist: Rowland Burdon
- Labour:

== See also ==
- History of parliamentary constituencies and boundaries in Durham
