= 1973 Berwick-upon-Tweed by-election =

1973 UK Parliamentary by-election

← 1970	8 November 1973	Feb. 1974 →

Constituency of Berwick-upon-Tweed
- Turnout: 75.0% (▲1.3%)
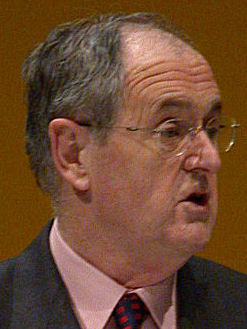

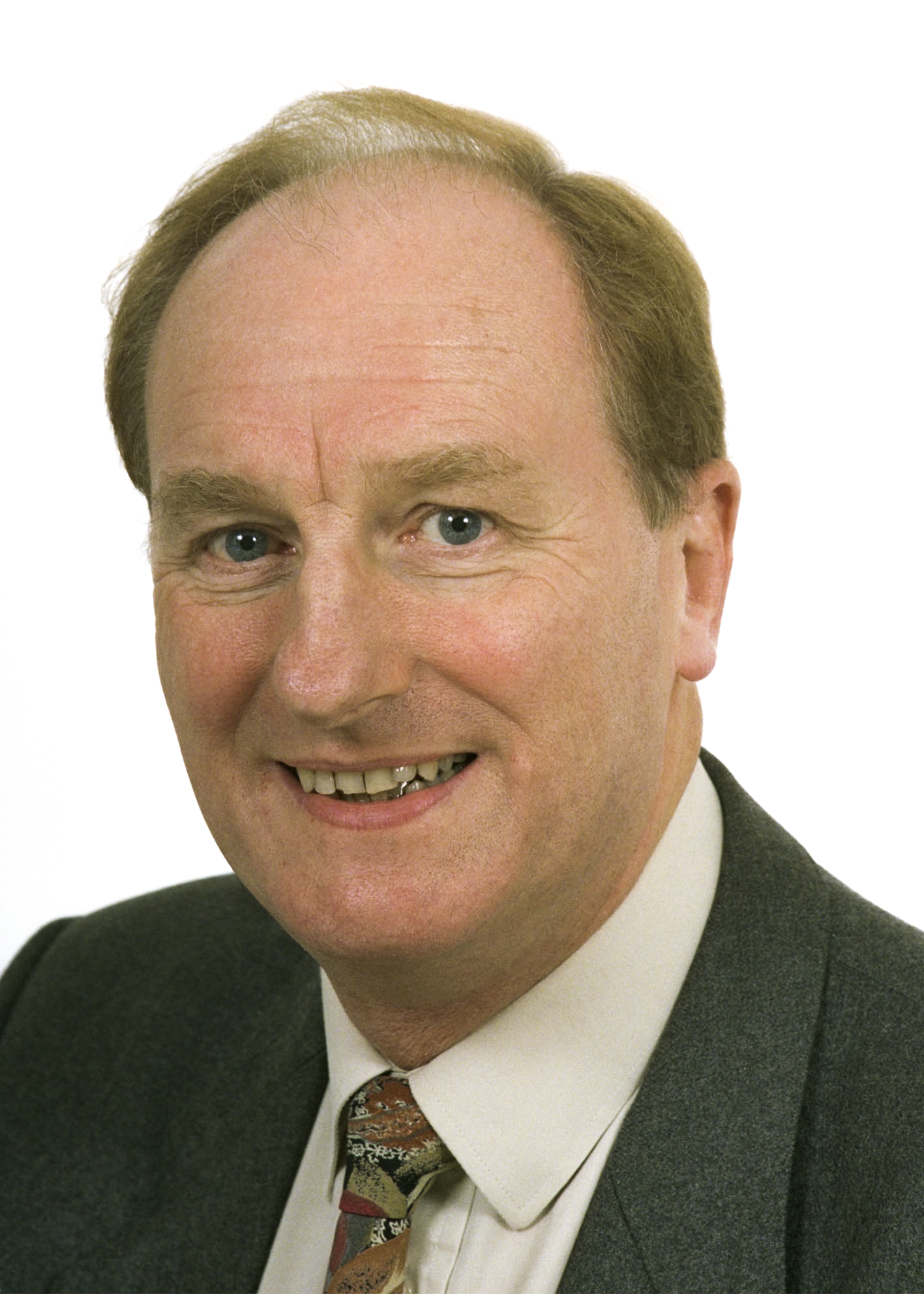
	First party	Second party	Third party
		Con
Candidate	Alan Beith	J.D.M. Hardie	Gordon Adam
Party	Liberal	Conservative	Labour
Popular vote	12,489	12,432	6,178
Percentage	39.9%	39.7%	19.8%
Swing	▲18.0%	▼11.0%	▼7.6%
MP before election
Antony Lambton
Conservative
Subsequent MP
Alan Beith
Liberal

The 1973 Berwick-upon-Tweed by-election was a parliamentary by-election held on 8 November 1973 for the House of Commons constituency of Berwick-upon-Tweed. It was one of four UK by-elections held on the same day.

The by-election took place during the 1970s Liberal Party revival. This was the fifth Liberal gain during the 1970–1974 Parliament. Although largely overshadowed by the Scottish National Party's spectacular victory in Glasgow Govan on the same day, it was the narrowest by-election result since the Carmarthen by-election in 1928, forty-five years earlier, and would remain the closest post-1945 result until the Runcorn and Helsby by-election in May 2025, which was won by just six votes.

== Previous MP ==
The seat had become vacant when the constituency's Conservative Member of Parliament (MP), Antony Claud Frederick Lambton, resigned following a private scandal. To resign from the House of Commons he asked to be appointed to the sinecure office of Steward of the Chiltern Hundreds, which appointment was made on 1 June 1973. The Stewardship is a notional office of profit under the Crown, appointment to which vacates an MPs seat in Parliament. Lambton, a Conservative, had been MP for the constituency since 1951.

Antony Lambton (10 July 1922 – 30 December 2006), was briefly the 6th Earl of Durham in 1970 but disclaimed that title to remain in the House of Commons. He was known before 1970 by the courtesy title of Viscount Lambton, a style he continued to claim after renouncing his peerage.

== Candidates ==
Five candidates were nominated. The list below is set out in descending order of the number of votes received at the by-election.

1. The Liberal Party candidate was Alan James Beith, born on 20 April 1943. He was a lecturer in politics and a local Councillor. Beith had contested the constituency in the 1970 general election, finishing third.

Beith won the by-election and retained the seat until his retirement in 2015, and by the 2010 election was the longest serving Liberal Democrat MP.

Beith was the Liberal Party Chief Whip 1977–1985 and Deputy Leader 1985–1988. Following the formation of the (Social and) Liberal Democrats in 1988, he contested the party leadership. Beith subsequently became Deputy Leader of the Parliamentary Party, a post he held from 1992 until 2003.

2. The Conservative candidate was J.D.M. Hardie. He had previously contested the Scottish seats of West Stirlingshire in 1966 and Berwickshire and East Lothian in 1970.

After losing the by-election, Hardie again contested the seat in the February 1974 general election.

3. The Labour Party was represented by Dr Gordon Johnston Adam, a mining engineer (born 28 March 1934). At the 1966 general election, Adam was the Labour Party candidate for the Tynemouth constituency.

In August 1973, he was chosen to fight the byelection in Berwick-upon-Tweed, and decided to focus on the issues of housing and prices. The Times Diary noted that Labour had drafted 13 professionals in to lead their campaign but described Adam as "a charm-free technocrat". Adam saw Labour overtaken by the Liberal Party who narrowly won the seat; he took comfort that the Labour vote had held firm.

Adam again contested the constituency in the February 1974 general election. He was a member of the European Parliament from 1979 until he retired in 2004 (apart from six months in 1999).

4. T.G. Symonds was an Independent candidate. Tim Symonds then joined the Liberal Party and became the Liberal Parliamentary candidate in Newcastle East in the late-1974 general election. In 1980 he co-founded with Lesley Abdela the all-Party 300 Group for Women in Politics.

5. Robert Goodall was an Independent candidate. He had previously contested West Derbyshire in 1944, 1945 and 1967, and the 1971 Macclesfield by-election, finishing bottom of the poll each time.

== Result ==
1973 by-election: Berwick-upon-Tweed
Party	Candidate	Votes	%	±%
Liberal	Alan Beith	12,489	39.9	+18.0
Conservative	J.D.M. Hardie	12,432	39.7	−11.0
Labour	Gordon Adam	6,178	19.8	−7.6
Independent	T.G. Symonds	126	0.4	New
Independent	R. Goodall	72	0.2	New
Majority		57	0.2	N/A
Turnout		31,297	75.0	+1.4
Registered electors		41,721		
Liberal gain from Conservative		Swing	+14.5	

== See also ==
- Berwick-upon-Tweed constituency
- List of United Kingdom by-elections (1950–1979)
- United Kingdom by-election records
- 1973 Edinburgh North by-election
- 1973 Glasgow Govan by-election
- 1973 Hove by-election
