= Alan Beith =

British politician

The Right Honourable The Lord Beith PC
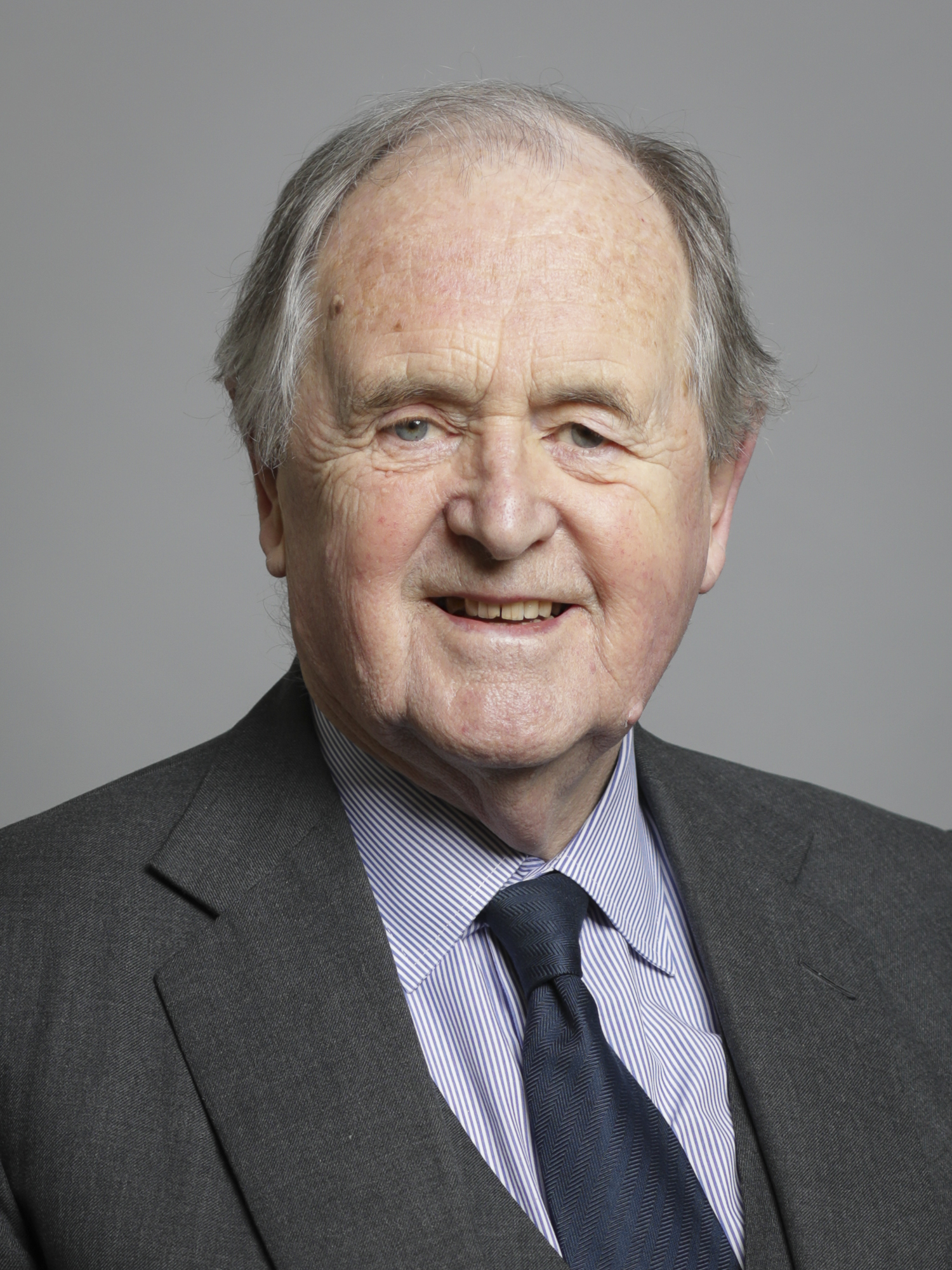
- Official portrait, 2019

Chair of the Liaison Committee
- In office 21 July 2010 – 30 March 2015
- Preceded by: Alan Williams
- Succeeded by: Andrew Tyrie

Deputy Leader of the Liberal Democrats
- In office 11 April 1992 – 12 February 2003
- Leader: Paddy Ashdown; Charles Kennedy
- Preceded by: Russell Johnston
- Succeeded by: Menzies Campbell

Deputy Leader of the Liberal Party
- In office 1985–1988
- Leader: David Steel
- Preceded by: John Pardoe (1979)
- Succeeded by: Russell Johnston (Liberal Democrats)
Frontbench positions
Liberal Democrat Leader of the House of Commons
In office 29 August 1999 – 15 May 2003
Leader	Charles Kennedy
Preceded by	Charles Kennedy
Succeeded by	Paul Tyler
Liberal Democrat Spokesperson for Home Affairs
In office 12 July 1994 – 29 August 1999
Leader	Paddy Ashdown
Preceded by	Position established
Succeeded by	Simon Hughes
Liberal Chief Whip in the House of Commons
In office 1977–1985
Leader	David Steel
Preceded by	Cyril Smith
Succeeded by	David Alton

Member of the House of Lords
- Lord Temporal
- Life peerage 19 October 2015

Member of Parliament for Berwick-upon-Tweed
- In office 8 November 1973 – 30 March 2015
- Preceded by: Antony Lambton
- Succeeded by: Anne-Marie Trevelyan

Personal details
- Born: 20 April 1943 (age 83) Poynton, Cheshire, England
- Party: Liberal (before 1988); Liberal Democrats (1988–present)
- Spouses: Barbara Ward (m. 1965; died 1998) Diana, Baroness Maddock (m. 2001; died 2020)
- Children: 2
- Education: Balliol College, Oxford; Nuffield College, Oxford
- Website: Official website

Alan James Beith, Baron Beith (born 20 April 1943), is a British Liberal Democrat politician who represented Berwick-upon-Tweed as its Member of Parliament (MP) from 1973 to 2015.

From 1992 to 2003 he was Deputy Leader of the Liberal Democrats. By 2015 he was the longest-serving member of his party's House of Commons delegation, and was the last Liberal Democrat MP to have experience of Parliament in the 1970s.

Beith was elevated as a life peer in the 2015 Dissolution Honours list, and took his title and a seat on the House of Lords opposition benches on 23 November 2015.

== Early life ==
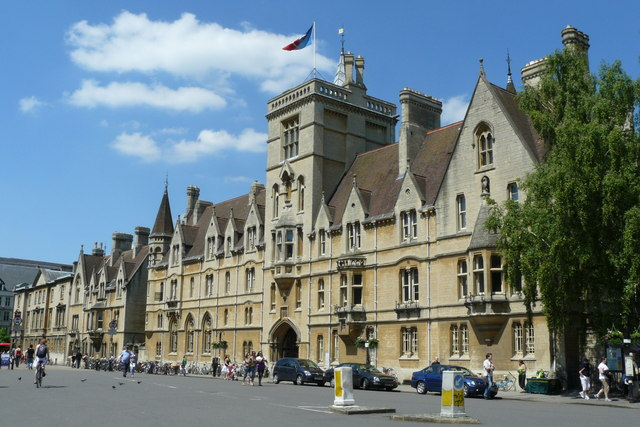
Balliol College, Oxford

The son of John Beith, of Scottish extraction, he was born in 1943 at Poynton in Cheshire. He was educated at The King's School, Macclesfield before going to Balliol College, Oxford, where he read Philosophy, Politics and Economics graduating in 1964. He then pursued postgraduate studies at Nuffield College, receiving a Bachelor of Letters (BLitt) degree.

In 1966, Beith began his career as a Politics lecturer at the University of Newcastle upon Tyne. In 1969 he was elected as a Councillor on Hexham Rural District Council and, in 1970, he was also elected to Corbridge parish council. He contested Berwick-upon-Tweed as the Liberal candidate at the 1970 general election but was heavily defeated by the sitting Conservative MP Antony Lambton.

== Parliamentary career ==
Beith became a member of Tynedale District Council in 1973. Later that year, Antony Lambton resigned as an MP following a Fleet Street exposé. At the ensuing by-election on 8 November 1973, Beith was narrowly elected by 57 votes, becoming Berwick's first Liberal MP since 1945.

Just three months after his by-election success, Beith was out canvassing his constituents again at the February 1974 general election, being returned to Parliament with an increased majority of 443. Later that same year and still less than a year after entering the House of Commons, Beith had to contest the constituency for a third time in less than a year at the October 1974 general election, retaining his seat with a slender majority of 73 votes. He held his seat with comfortable majorities in the eight further elections he stood in.

=== Deputy Leader of the Liberal Party ===
Beith was appointed to the BBC Advisory Council in 1974, and served as a member until 1984. On the election of David Steel as Liberal Leader in 1976, Beith became the Party's Chief Whip in the Commons. After the 1983 general election, he was appointed Liberal Spokesman for Constitutional Affairs. He was elected as Deputy Leader of the Liberal Party in 1985, in both cases continuing his duties as a Commons Chief Whip.

After the 1987 general election, Beith concentrated his efforts as Liberal Spokesman for Treasury Affairs and stood down from being Liberal Chief Whip after eleven years in post. In 1988, the Liberal and Social Democratic parties merged, initially as the Social and Liberal Democrats.

=== Deputy Leader of the Liberal Democrats ===
Beith stood against Paddy Ashdown in the first leadership election in 1988, an election which Ashdown won by a large margin. Beith stayed on as Deputy Leader of the Liberal Democrats following the 1992 general election under Ashdown until 2003, and was sworn of the Privy Council in 1992. In 1994, he became the Liberal Democrat Home Affairs spokesperson and continued in post under Charles Kennedy's leadership. After the 2001 general election he briefly became Lib Dem spokesperson for the Lord Chancellor's Department, but left the Lib Dem frontbench in 2002, though remaining its Deputy Leader until the following year.

After standing down from the Lib Dem frontbench he chaired the Commons Constitutional Affairs, and Justice Committees. Following Sir Menzies Campbell's resignation as Leader of the Liberal Democrats on 15 October 2007, Beith was encouraged to stand as a prospective compromise candidate for the Lib Dem leadership. However, via his personal website, he announced his decision not to stand for election as party leader.

=== Later developments ===
On 19 May 2009, Beith was the first MP to declare his candidacy to succeed Speaker Michael Martin, who stood down from the position on 21 June 2009. Beith pledged he was "willing to take on the task of leading reform" were he elected as Commons Speaker. Conservative MP John Bercow won, becoming the 157th Speaker of the House Commons of the United Kingdom.

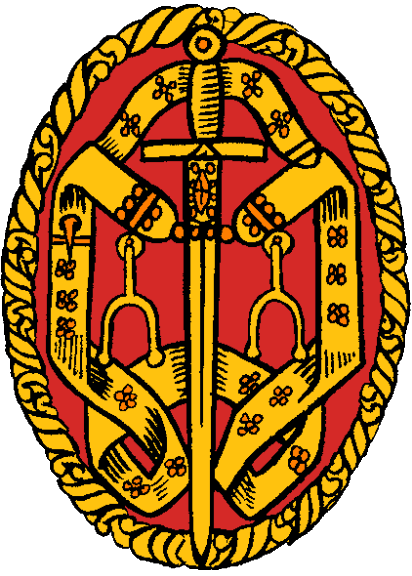
Insignia of a Knight Bachelor

Beith was knighted in the 2008 Birthday Honours.

On 22 May 2009, Beith was reported by The Daily Telegraph to have claimed £117,000 in second home allowances while his wife, Baroness Maddock, claimed £60,000 Lords expenses for sharing the same address.

Replying in writing on both their behalf to The Telegraph journalist's exposé: "It would be quite wrong for the taxpayer to pay twice for the same costs, so we have shared the costs, either by sharing the cost of rent, or by my wife using her allowance towards costs incurred (she normally claims only half the Lords' overnight allowance)", he argued in defence.

=== Coalition Government ===
At the May 2010 general election he was returned as MP for Berwick; however, his majority was reduced by a substantial swing to the Conservatives.

Beith served as Chairman of the Commons Justice and of the Liaison Select Committees until retiring in 2015.

He was one of only four Liberal Democrat MPs to vote against the third reading of the Marriage (Same Sex Couples) Bill. He was the only Liberal Democrat MP to oppose recognising Palestine as a state in the Commons vote on 13 October 2014.

Beith campaigned throughout his years in the House of Commons for the A1 road to be made a dual carriageway in Northumberland.

=== Elevation to the House of Lords ===
On 7 August 2013, Beith announced that he would retire as an MP at the next election, as he would by the time of the election have represented Berwick-upon-Tweed for 42 years. He was announced as a life peer in the 2015 Dissolution Honours and was created Baron Beith, of Berwick-upon-Tweed in the County of Northumberland, on the afternoon of 19 October.

== Politics ==
Beith is more left-leaning and liberal in social issues, and more right-leaning and conservative economically.

=== Taxes ===
Beith has only voted for reducing VAT once, on 13 December 2008; from then on he voted for raising it. Beith supports higher taxes for alcohol. He always voted against a mansion tax. He also has voted for reducing capital gains tax and corporation tax. He has voted for raising the threshold for paying income tax.

=== Social ===
He voted against the Marriage (Same Sex Couples) Act 2013 in its third reading. Beith also voted for smoking bans and against a hunting ban. He supports lowering the voting age to 16. The Liberal Democrats generally support assisted dying; he has voted against it.

== Personal life ==
Beith was married in 1965 to Barbara Ward, and they had a son and a daughter. His first wife died in 1998, and he then married in 2001, Diana Maddock, Baroness Maddock (née Derbyshire), formerly MP for Christchurch (1993–1997).

Until her death on 26 June 2020, Lord Beith and Baroness Maddock divided their time between homes at Berwick-upon-Tweed, Northumberland, and London SW1; they were one of the few married couples both titled in their own right. Lord Beith serves as President of the Historic Chapels Trust, a charity he helped to found and of which he was Chair of Trustees between 2001 and 2014. He is also President of Northumberland Hospital Radio and of the National Liberal Club.

Lord Beith is a circuit lay preacher for the Methodist church, a role that he has undertaken for nearly 60 years. In 2016 the Methodist church in Berwick upon Tweed presented a certificate to Beith in recognition of his 50 years of service to that church. In 2013 Lord Beith wrote an essay entitled "Should the State forgive?" for the book Liberal Democrats do God, which discussed the theological interplay between the Christian understanding of forgiveness and a government's criminal justice system. He is a past President of the Liberal Democrat Christian Forum.

He reportedly speaks French, Norwegian, Swedish and Welsh, and is a keen supporter of heritage matters.

== Honours ==
- Membership of Her Majesty's Most Honourable Privy Council (13 June 1992)
- Life peer (2015)
- Knight Bachelor (2008)

Honorary doctorates:

- Hon. DCL (Newcastle) 1998.
- DCL (Northumbria) 16 July 2010.
- Hon. DHL (Earlham).

Parliament of the United Kingdom
Preceded by Viscount Lambton	Member of Parliament for Berwick-upon-Tweed; 1973–2015	Succeeded by Anne-Marie Trevelyan
Party political offices
Preceded by Sir Cyril Smith	Liberal Chief Whip in the House of Commons; 1977–1985	Succeeded by David Alton
Preceded by John Pardoe as Deputy Leader of the Liberals	Deputy Leader of the Liberal Party (position abolished); 1985–1988	Succeeded by Russell Johnston as Deputy Leader of the Liberal Democrats
Preceded by Russell Johnston	Deputy Leader of the Liberal Democrats; 1992–2003	Succeeded by Sir Menzies Campbell
Orders of precedence in the United Kingdom
Preceded by The Lord Bruce of Bennachie	Gentlemen; Baron Beith	Followed by The Lord Murphy of Torfaen
