= Joseph Richardson (Liberal politician) =

Joseph Richardson

Joseph Richardson (1830 – 25 September 1902) was a Liberal Party politician in England.

== Career ==
Richardson was a son of Caleb Richardson, a member of an old Quaker family. He had several brothers, including Edwin Richardson (d.1902) and Stansfield Richardson, who both served as Mayors of Sunderland.

Richardson was head of the firm of Messrs. Richardson, Duck and Company, one of the chief shipbuilding firms on the Tees River, which in 1852 turned out the first two iron vessels launched on the river. He was also largely interested in the Durham collieries and iron works.

Richardson was five times Mayor of the borough of Stockton-on-Tees, including on his death in 1902. He was a Deputy Lieutenant of Durham and a vice-chairman of the Durham County Council.

He was elected as member of parliament (MP) for South East Durham at the 1892 general election. He was defeated at the 1895 general election by the Liberal Unionist Sir Henry Havelock-Allan, who he had ousted in 1892. Havelock-Allan died in 1897, and Richardson won the resulting by-election in 1898, but lost his seat again at the 1900 general election.

He died after a long illness on 25 September 1902, aged 72. He was three times married.

Parliament of the United Kingdom
Preceded by Sir Henry Havelock-Allan	Member of Parliament for South East Durham; 1892 – 1895	Succeeded by Sir Henry Havelock-Allan
Preceded by Sir Henry Havelock-Allan	Member of Parliament for South East Durham; 1898 – 1900	Succeeded by Frederick Lambton
