= Evan Hayward =

Evan Hayward (2 April 1876 – 30 January 1958) was a Liberal Party politician in England.

== Background and education ==
Hayward was born in Wotton-under-Edge, Gloucestershire and attended Katherine Lady Berkeley's Grammar School where he studied politics and law.

== Political career ==
Hayward was elected as Member of Parliament (MP) for South East Durham at the January 1910 general election, and held the seat until the constituency was abolished at the 1918 general election. He then stood for the new Seaham constituency in County Durham, as a Liberal candidate; he had been issued with the "coalition coupon", but repudiated it. Nonetheless, the Conservative Party did not field a candidate in Seaham, and Hayward won the seat with a comfortable 17% majority over his Labour Party opponent. However, at the 1922 general election, the Conservatives did field a candidate. Hayward was pushed into a poor third place with only 15.5% of the votes, and Labour's Sidney Webb took the seat with nearly 60% of the votes.

After his defeat, Hayward did not stand for Parliament again.

=== Electoral record ===
General election January 1910: South East Durham
| Party | Candidate | Votes | % | ±% |
|---|---|---|---|---|
| Liberal | Evan Hayward | 9,298 | 57.5 | n/a |
| Conservative | Frederick Lambton | 6,860 | 42.5 | n/a |
| Majority | | 2,438 | 15.0 | n/a |
| Turnout | | 16,158 | 85.6 | n/a |
| Registered electors | | 18,880 | | |
| Liberal gain from Liberal Unionist | | Swing | n/a | |

General election December 1910: South East Durham
| Party | Candidate | Votes | % | ±% |
|---|---|---|---|---|
| Liberal | Evan Hayward | 8,203 | 53.9 | −3.6 |
| Conservative | Rowland Burdon | 7,021 | 46.1 | +3.6 |
| Majority | | 1,182 | 7.8 | −7.2 |
| Turnout | | 15,224 | 80.6 | −5.0 |
| Registered electors | | 18,880 | | |
| Liberal hold | | Swing | −3.6 | |

General election 1918: Seaham
| Party | Candidate | Votes | % | ±% |
|---|---|---|---|---|
| Liberal | Evan Hayward | 12,754 | 58.7 | n/a |
| Labour | Jack Lawson | 8,988 | 41.3 | n/a |
| Majority | | 3,766 | 17.4 | n/a |
| Turnout | | | 59.2 | n/a |
| Liberal win | | | | |

General election 1922: Seaham
| Party | Candidate | Votes | % | ±% |
|---|---|---|---|---|
| Labour | Sidney Webb | 20,203 | 59.9 | +18.6 |
| Unionist | Thomas Andrews Bradford | 8,315 | 24.6 | n/a |
| Liberal | Evan Hayward | 5,247 | 15.5 | −43.2 |
| Majority | | 11,888 | 35.3 | n/a |
| Turnout | | | 81.9 | +22.7 |
| Labour gain from Liberal | | Swing | n/a | |

== Personal life ==
Hayward married Elizabeth Marion Bergfeldt at Kensington Chapel on 6 December 1913.

Parliament of the United Kingdom
| Preceded by Frederick William Lambton | Member of Parliament for South East Durham; January 1910 – 1918 | Constituency abolished |
| New constituency | Member of Parliament for Seaham; 1918 – 1922 | Succeeded by Sidney Webb |
