= Sir Henry Havelock-Allan, 1st Baronet =

Soldier and Victoria Cross recipient

Lieutenant-General Sir Henry Havelock-Allan VC Bt GCB DL
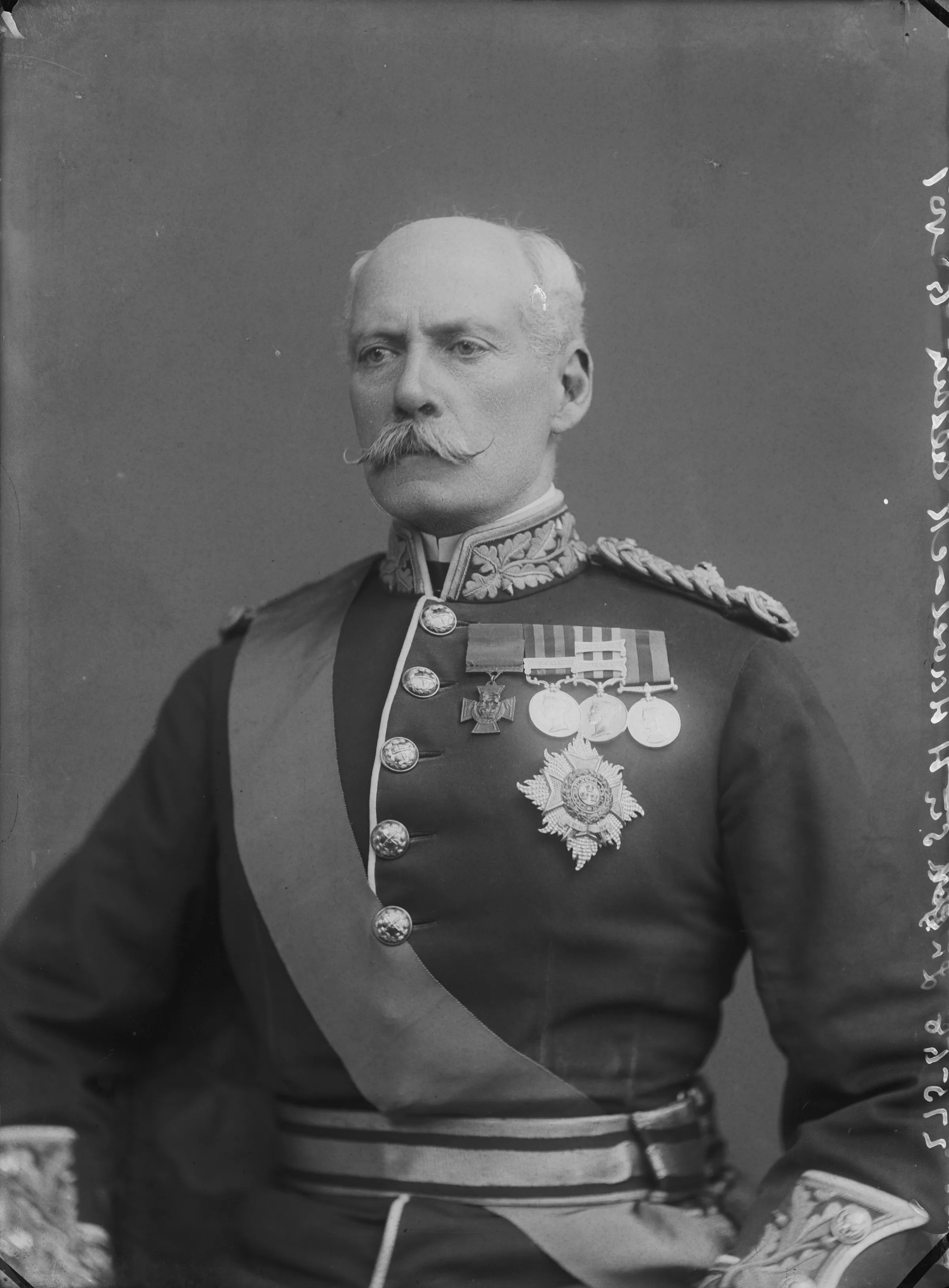
- Portrait by Alexander Bassano, 1897
- Born: 6 August 1830; Cawnpore, India
- Died: 30 December 1897 (aged 67); Khyber Pass, Afghanistan
- Burial place: Harley Street Cemetery, Rawalpindi
- Relatives: Major General Sir Henry Havelock (father); Joshua Marshman (grandfather); Hannah Marshman (grandmother)
- Military career
- Allegiance: United Kingdom
- Branch: British Army
- Service years: 1846–1881
- Rank: Lieutenant-General
- Units: 10th Regiment of Foot
- Conflicts: Anglo-Persian War; Indian Mutiny; New Zealand Wars; Anglo-Egyptian War
- Awards: Victoria Cross; Knight Grand Cross of the Order of the Bath; Mentioned in dispatches

Lieutenant-General Sir Henry Marshman Havelock-Allan, 1st Baronet, VC, GCB, DL (6 August 1830 – 30 December 1897) was a British soldier and politician. 'Allan' in the surname was added in March 1880.

== Early life ==
Havelock was born in Cawnpore, India on 6 August 1830, the son of Major General Sir Henry Havelock and his wife, Hannah née Marshman, the daughter of the missionaries Joshua and Hannah Marshman.

== Military career ==
Havelock was commissioned as an Ensign in the 39th Regiment of Foot in March 1846, and joined the Regiment in India. Moving to the 86th Foot as a Lieutenant in June 1848, he transferred to the 10th Regiment of Foot in February 1852. He served in the Persian campaign of 1856–57, and was back in India at the outbreak of the Indian Mutiny in May 1857.

On 16 July 1857 at Cawnpore, the 64th Regiment had suffered badly under artillery fire. When the enemy was seen rallying their last 24-pounder, the order was given to advance, and Havelock immediately placed himself, on his horse, in front of the centre of the 64th, opposite the muzzle of the gun and moved on at a foot pace, in the face of shot and grape fired by the enemy. The advance went steadily on, led by Havelock and finally the gun was rushed and taken by the 64th. For this deed, Havelock was awarded the Victoria Cross. On 25 September 1857 he was badly wounded in the Siege of Lucknow.

On returning to England in 1860, Havelock joined his regiment, now the 18th Foot (Royal Irish Regiment), at Shorncliffe. He became deputy assistant adjutant-general at Aldershot on 1 October 1861. He was posted with the 18th Foot to New Zealand in August 1863, where he was appointed deputy assistant quartermaster-general and served under Major General Duncan Cameron from 1863 to 1864. He participated in the Invasion of Waikato, being present at Rangiriri, Waiari, Paterangi, Rangiaowhia, and at the siege and capture of Ōrākau. For his services during this period, he was mentioned in dispatches, promoted to major on 28 June 1864, and was made a Companion of the Order of the Bath in August 1866.

In March 1867 Havelock was posted to Canada, where he served as assistant quartermaster-general for two years. He then spent three years in Dublin performing the same role. In 1870 he was given leave of absence to act as a War correspondent in the Franco-Prussian War, being present at the Battle of Sedan. In 1877, he attended the Russo-Turkish War in the same capacity. He was promoted to colonel on 17 June 1868, and major general on 18 March 1878.

Ill health forced Havelock to retire from the active list on 9 December 1881, with the honorary rank of lieutenant general. However, when the Anglo-Egyptian War broke out the following year, he made his way to the British headquarters in Ismaïlia, telling a war correspondent: "Don't for goodness' sake mention me in your despatches, for my wife thinks I'm somewhere on the Riviera, but I could not resist coming here to see the fun." He petitioned the British commander, Sir Garnet Wolseley, for a role on the staff; but Wolseley refused, writing to his wife:

Havelock is still here as mad as ever: I received a letter from him yesterday, begging to have it sent home as it was a request to be re-employed, etc. etc., in his usual strain. I am extremely sorry for him, and feel for him very much, but still feel that he can never be employed again: he is not sane enough to argue with.

Nonetheless, Havelock was able to see action at the battles of Kassassin and Tel el-Kebir, where he supposedly led a charge armed with nothing but a riding crop.

== Baronetcy and Member of Parliament ==
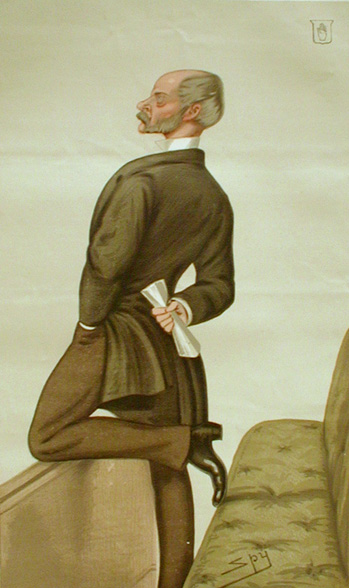
The soldier who couldn't draw his sword" – a caricature of Havelock-Allan in the House of Commons, Leslie Ward, 1879.

In 1858 Havelock was granted the baronetcy, originally intended for his father (who died a year earlier), and he and his mother were granted a parliamentary pension of £1,000 a year. He later went to England and became a Member of Parliament in 1874 for his father's birth-town of Sunderland until 1881. He inherited Blackwell Grange, the former property of his cousin Robert Allan, changed his surname to Havelock-Allan, (as was required by the will of the latter) and became an MP for South East Durham from 1885 to 1892.

== Death ==
Havelock was re-elected in 1895 and also became Colonel of the Royal Irish Regiment, stationed in India, that year. It was there that he was killed by Afridi clansmen on the Afghanistan side of the Khyber Pass in 1897 and he was later buried in Rawalpindi.

== Works ==
In 1867, Havelock published his Three Main Military Questions of the Day, which addressed the issues of a Home Reserve Army, improved economic military tenure of India and the effects of breechloading arms on cavalry.

Parliament of the United Kingdom
Preceded by John Candlish; Edward Gourley	Member of Parliament for Sunderland; 1874–1881; With: Edward Gourley	Succeeded by Edward Gourley; Samuel Storey
New constituency	Member of Parliament for South East Durham; 1885–1892	Succeeded by Joseph Richardson
Preceded by Joseph Richardson	Member of Parliament for South East Durham; 1895–1897	Succeeded by Joseph Richardson
Military offices
Preceded by Walter Fraser	Colonel of the Royal Irish Regiment; 1895–1897	Succeeded by Charles Gregorie
Baronetage of the United Kingdom
New creation	Baronet (of Lucknow); 1858–1897	Succeeded by Henry Havelock-Allan
