= George Lambton, 2nd Earl of Durham =

British peer

The Right Honourable The Earl of Durham

Lord-Lieutenant of County Durham
- In office 1854–1879
- Preceded by: The Marquess of Londonderry
- Succeeded by: The Marquess of Londonderry

Personal details
- Born: George Frederick D'Arcy Lambton; 5 September 1828 Copse Hill, Wimbledon, England
- Died: 27 November 1879 (aged 51) Mayfair, London, England
- Spouse: Lady Beatrix Frances Hamilton (m. 1854; died 1871)
- Children: 13
- Parent(s): John Lambton, 1st Earl of Durham; Lady Louisa Elizabeth
- Education: Cambridge University

George Frederick D'Arcy Lambton, 2nd Earl of Durham (5 September 1828 – 27 November 1879), styled Viscount Lambton from 1833 to 1840, was a British peer.

== Early life ==
Lambton was born on 5 September 1828 at Copse Hill, Wimbledon and was baptised at St Mary's Church, Wimbledon on 29 September that year. He was the second (and, later, eldest surviving) son of John Lambton, 1st Earl of Durham, and his second wife Lady Louisa Elizabeth. His mother was a daughter of Charles Grey, 2nd Earl Grey. He was known by his third name of D'Arcy, the maiden name of an ancestor whose inheritance included land surrounding what would later become Lambton Castle. From his father's first marriage to Harriet Cholmondeley (the illegitimate daughter of George Cholmondeley, 1st Marquess of Cholmondeley), his elder half-sister was Lady Frances Charlotte Lambton, who married John Ponsonby, 5th Earl of Bessborough.

At age 11, Lambton inherited the earldom of Durham when his father, who served as British Ambassador to Russia and Governor General of Canada, died in 1840. His mother died from a severe cold just over a year later. He attended Trinity College, Cambridge, in 1846.

== Public life ==
Lord Durham served as Lord-Lieutenant of County Durham from 1854 to 1879.

On 19 July 1877, the Earl of Durham signed a document giving an acre of his land to be used for the construction of a church in the newly formed parish of Fatfield. Fatfield, St George's church, Washington was completed in 1879 and was built in the Early English Gothic style.

== Personal life ==
On 23 May 1854, Lord Durham married Lady Beatrix Frances Hamilton (1835–1871) at St George's, Hanover Square. Lady Beatrix was the second daughter of James Hamilton, 1st Duke of Abercorn and Lady Louisa Jane Russell (a daughter of John Russell, 6th Duke of Bedford. Together, they had thirteen children:

- John George Lambton, 3rd Earl of Durham (1855–1928), who married Ethel Elizabeth Louisa Milner, a daughter of Henry Beilby William Milner. He had a child out of wedlock with the dancer Letty Lind.
- Frederick William Lambton, 4th Earl of Durham (1855–1929) who married Beatrix Bulteel, a daughter of John Bulteel.
- Adm. Hon. Sir Hedworth Lambton (later Meux) (1856–1929), Admiral of the Fleet, who married Hon. Mildred Cecilia Harriet, Dowager Viscountess Chelsea, daughter of Henry Sturt, 1st Baron Alington, on 18 April 1910. They had no issue.
- Hon. Charles Lambton (1857–1949), who married Lavinia Marion Garforth and had issue.
- Lady Beatrix Louisa Lambton (1859–1944), who married Sidney Herbert, 14th Earl of Pembroke and had issue.
- Hon. George Lambton (1860–1945), who married Cicely Margaret Horner and had issue.
- Lady Katherine Frances Lambton (1862–1952), who married George Osborne, 10th Duke of Leeds and had issue.
- Maj.-Gen. Hon. Sir William Lambton (1863–1936), who married (as her second husband) Lady Katherine de Vere Somerset, née Beauclerk, daughter of William Beauclerk, 10th Duke of St Albans on 22 April 1921. They had no issue.
- Hon. Claud Lambton (1865–1945), who married Lettice Wormald and had issue.
- Captain The Hon. D'Arcy Lambton Royal Navy (1866–1954), married Florence Ethel Sproule and had issue.
- Lady Eleanor Lambton (1868–1959), who married Robert Cecil, 1st Viscount Cecil of Chelwood.
- Lady Anne Lambton (1869–1922).
- Hon. Francis Lambton (1871–1914), who was killed in action near Zandvoorde, Belgium, during World War I.

The Countess of Durham died on 21 January 1871, aged 35, and just three days after the birth of her youngest child. In 1876, Lord Durham had his right eye removed after he was shot by his son, Charles, while on a shooting party. Lord Durham died at 6:05pm on 27 November 1879 at his town house on Hill Street in Mayfair, aged 51, and was succeeded in the earldom by his eldest twin son John. The Earl and Countess and some of their children are buried in St Barnabas' Church, Bournmoor, which the Earl had built at his own expense when the parish was created in 1867.

Honorary titles
Preceded by The Marquess of Londonderry	Lord Lieutenant of Durham; 1854–1879	Succeeded by The Marquess of Londonderry
Peerage of the United Kingdom
Preceded by John Lambton	Earl of Durham; 1840–1879	Succeeded by John Lambton
