= Northumbria (European Parliament constituency) =

Former European Parliament constituency

- European Parliament constituency
- Boundary within North East England (1979-1984)
- Member state: United Kingdom
- Created: 1979
- Dissolved: 1999
- MEPs: 1

Northumbria was an English European Parliament constituency that existed from 1979 to 1999. Prior to its uniform adoption of proportional representation in 1999, the United Kingdom used first-past-the-post for the European elections in England, Scotland and Wales. The European Parliament constituencies used under that system were smaller than the later regional constituencies and only had one Member of the European Parliament each.

Boundary within North East England (1984-1994)

Boundary within North East England (1994-1999)

== Boundaries ==
1979-1984: Berwick-upon-Tweed, Blyth, Hexham, Morpeth, Newcastle-upon-Tyne Central, Newcastle-upon-Tyne East, Newcastle-upon-Tyne North, Newcastle-upon-Tyne West, Wallsend
1984-1999: Berwick-upon-Tweed, Blyth Valley, Hexham, Newcastle-upon-Tyne Central, Newcastle-upon-Tyne North, Tynemouth, Wallsend, Wansbeck.

== Members of the European Parliament ==
Election	Member	Party
1979	Gordon Adam	Labour
1984	Gordon Adam	Labour
1989	Gordon Adam	Labour
1994	Gordon Adam	Labour

Key to political groups of the European Parliament (UK)
Party			Faction in European Parliament	
Brexit Party	29		Non-Inscrits	57
DUP	1		Non-Inscrits	57
Liberal Democrats	16	17	Renew Europe	108
Alliance	1	17	Renew Europe	108
Green	7	11	Greens–European Free Alliance	75
SNP	3	11	Greens–European Free Alliance	75
Plaid Cymru	1	11	Greens–European Free Alliance	75
Labour	10		Socialists and Democrats	154
Conservative	4		European Conservatives and Reformists Group	62
Sinn Féin	1		European United Left–Nordic Green Left	41
Total	73		Total	750

== Election results ==
European Parliament election, 1979: Northumbria
Party	Candidate	Votes	%	±%
Labour	G. J. Adams	75,172	44.8	
Conservative	J.G.B. Weait	67,066	39.9	
Liberal	G. Scott	25,713	15.3	
Majority		8,106	4.9	
Turnout		167,951	32.2	
Labour win (new seat)				

European Parliament election, 1984: Northumbria
Party	Candidate	Votes	%	±%
Labour	G. J. Adams	78,417	42.6	−2.2
Conservative	Charles M.M. Crichton	62,717	34.1	−5.8
Liberal	George Scott	42,946	23.3	+8.0
Majority		15,700	8.5	+3.6
Turnout		184,080	35.9	+3.7
Labour hold		Swing		

European Parliament election, 1989: Northumbria
Party	Candidate	Votes	%	±%
Labour	G. J. Adams	110,688	56.1	+13.5
Conservative	Paul S. Yeoman	50,648	25.7	−8.4
Green	Mrs. Amanda J. Lipman	24,882	12.6	New
SLD	Viscount Morpeth	10,983	5.6	−17.7
Majority		60,040	30.4	+21.9
Turnout		514,123	38.4	+2.5
Labour hold		Swing		

European Parliament election, 1994: Northumbria
Party	Candidate	Votes	%	±%
Labour	G. J. Adam	103,087	59.3	+3.2
Conservative	J.C. Flack	36,929	21.2	−4.5
Liberal Democrats	Lembit Öpik	20,197	11.6	+6.0
UKIP	David Lott	7,210	4.2	New
Green	John P. Hartshorne	5,714	3.3	−9.3
Natural Law	Lewis J. Walch	740	0.4	New
Majority		66,158	38.1	+7.7
Turnout		516,680	33.7	−4.7
Labour hold		Swing		
