= New Lambton, County Durham =

Village in County Durham, England

Coordinates: 54.858°N 1.511°W

New Lambton
- Location within County Durham
- OS grid reference: NZ315505
- Unitary authority: County Durham
- Ceremonial county: County Durham
- Region: North East
- Country: England
- Sovereign state: United Kingdom
- Post town: HOUGHTON LE SPRING
- Postcode district: DH4
- Police: Durham
- Fire: County Durham and Darlington
- Ambulance: North East

New Lambton is a village in County Durham, England, although the postal address is Tyne and Wear. It lies between the villages of Bournmoor and Fencehouses, and about 3 miles (5 km) east of Chester-le-Street.
