= William Lambton (British Army officer) =

British Army general (1863–1936)

Major-General The Honourable Sir William Lambton KCB CMG CVO DSO
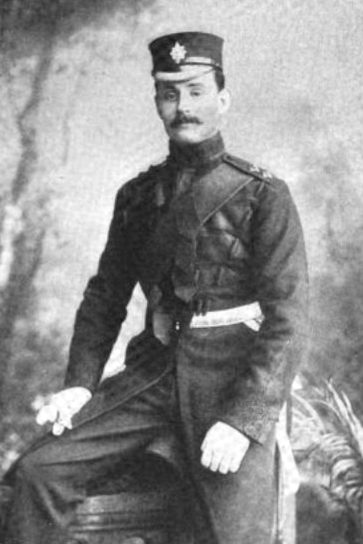
- In The Sketch, 27 December 1899
- Born: 4 December 1863; Durham, County Durham, England
- Died: 11 October 1936 (aged 72); Cap-d'Ail, France
- Spouse: Lady Katherine Beauclerk (m. 1921)
- Relatives: George Lambton, 2nd Earl of Durham (father)
- Military career
- Allegiance: United Kingdom
- Branch: British Army
- Service years: 1884–1920
- Rank: Major-General
- Unit: Coldstream Guards
- Commands: 1st Battalion, Coldstream Guards; 4th Division
- Conflicts: Mahdist War; Second Boer War; First World War
- Awards: Companion of the Order of the Bath; Distinguished Service Order

Major-General Sir William Lambton, KCB, CMG, CVO, DSO (4 December 1863 – 11 October 1936) was a British Army officer who commanded the 4th Division during the First World War.

== Early military career ==
Born the son of George Lambton, 2nd Earl of Durham, he was educated at Eton College and the Royal Military College at Sandhurst.

Lambton was commissioned a lieutenant in the Coldstream Guards on 6 February 1884, promoted to captain on 18 May 1892, and became aide-de-camp to the governor-general of Ireland in August 1893, before attending the Staff College, Camberley from 1897–1898. After graduating, he was seconded in order to serve with the Egyptian Army and took part in the Nile expedition of 1898 and fought at the Battle of Atbara and the Battle of Omdurman, and was promoted to major on 29 September 1898.

Following the outbreak of the Second Boer War in late 1899, his battalion was sent to South Africa. As part of the Kimberley Relief Force, he was present at the Battle of Magersfontein on 10–11 December 1899, in which the defending Boer force defeated the advancing British forces amongst heavy casualties for the latter. Lambton was mentioned in the despatch from Paul Methuen, who described the battle and how Lambton had refused to be carried off the battlefield despite being wounded.

After his recovery, he served as military secretary to the commander-in-chief of the Transvaal, and was military secretary to Alfred Milner, high commissioner for Southern Africa, from December 1900, with the local rank of lieutenant colonel. He was appointed a Companion of the Distinguished Service Order in April 1901.

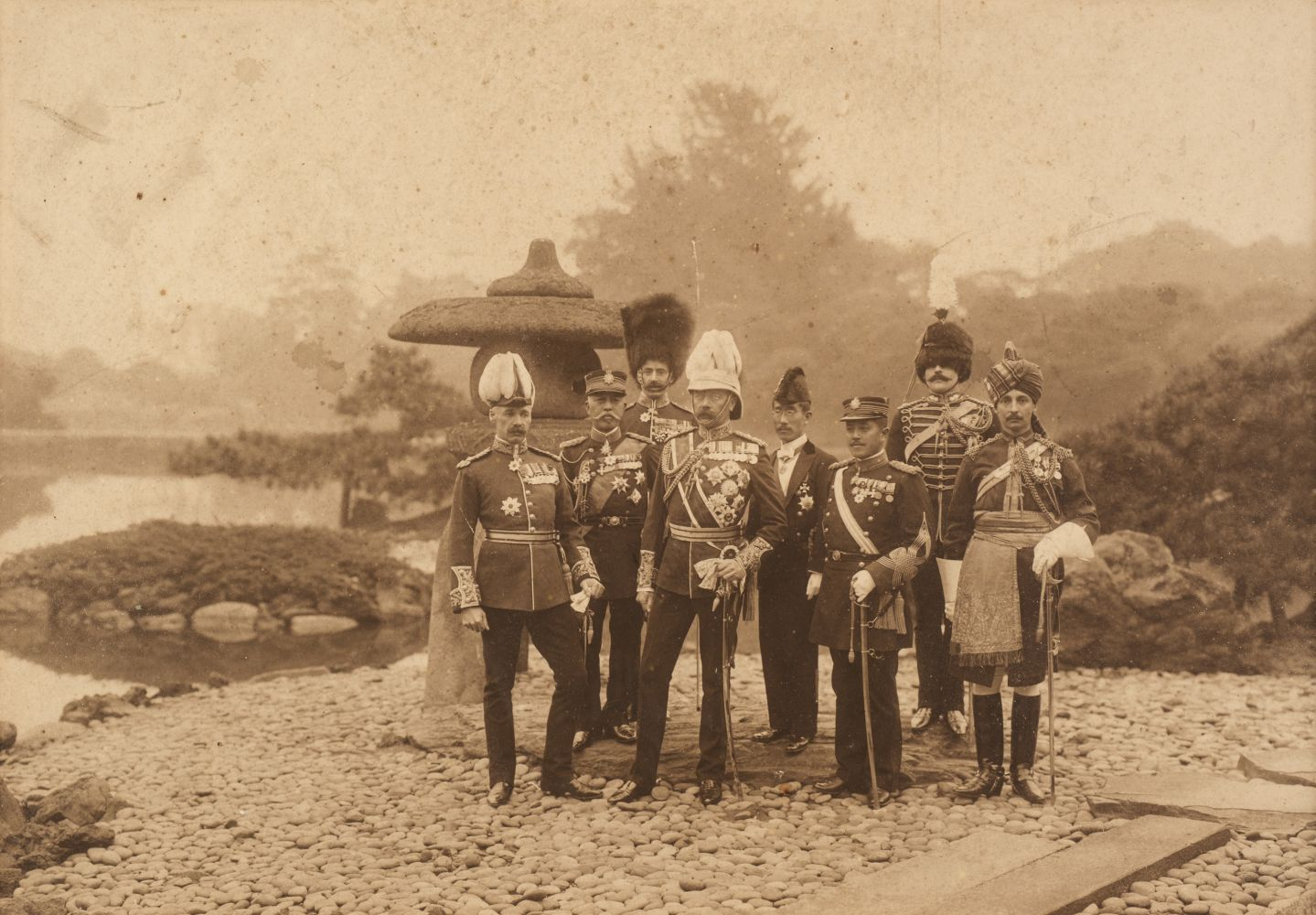
Group of Lord Kitchener's Mission to Japan to attend the Imperial Grand Japanese Manoeuvres. Taken in the grounds of the Shiba Palace, Tokyo, November 1909. Lieutenant Colonel Lambton stands third on the left.

In October 1906 he was promoted to lieutenant colonel and, by now commanding the 1st Battalion, Coldstream Guards, in May 1907 was made a CEO.

In August 1910, after being promoted to colonel, he succeeded Brigadier General Ivor Maxse in command of the Coldstream Guards and the regimental district. He was appointed commanding officer of the 1st Battalion, Coldstream Guards in 1912, and was Assistant Adjutant and Quartermaster-General for London District in 1913.

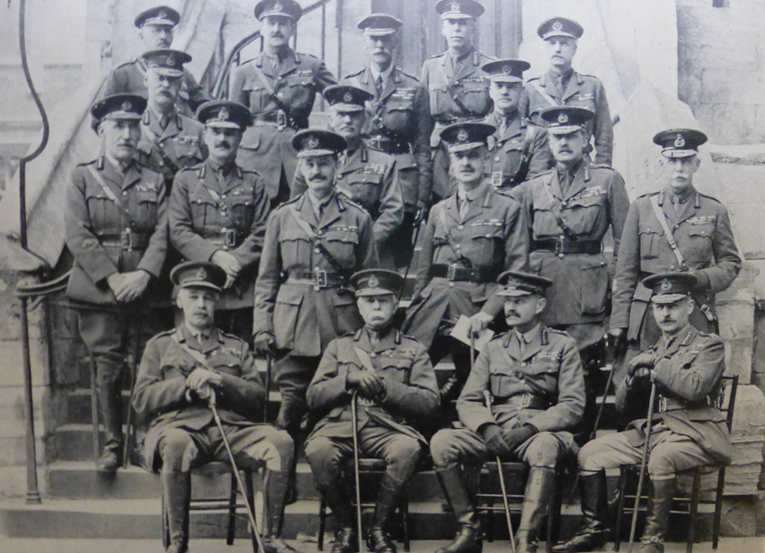
Eighteen Old Etonian generals revisit Eton, May 1919. Major General Lambton is stood in the middle row, fourth from the left.

== First World War ==
He was military secretary to the C-in-C of the British Expeditionary Force (BEF), Field Marshal Sir John French, at the beginning of the First World War in August 1914. He was promoted in September to temporary brigadier general, and was made a Companion of the Order of the Bath (CB), "for services rendered in connection with Operations in the Field", in February 1915.

He was promoted once again, now to major general, in June, "for distinguished service in the Field" and succeeded Major General Henry Wilson as general officer commanding (GOC) of the 4th Division in September, which he would be fated to lead for almost exactly two years. He would lead the division through some of the most intensive periods of attrition on the Western Front, including the Battle of the Somme in 1916. During the battle, his troops were heavily engaged in the first day of the offensive on 1 July, and later at the Battle of Albert and the Battle of Le Transloy. He continued to command the division into 1917, leading his men during the Battle of Arras and specifically the First Battle of the Scarpe.

Lambton’s active military career and tenure as GOC 4th Division came to an end in September 1917 after he sustained serious injuries in a riding accident.

== Post-war ==
He retired from the army in April 1920.

== Family ==
In 1921, he married Lady Katherine de Vere Somerset, née Beauclerk, daughter of William Beauclerk, 10th Duke of St Albans; they had no children.

William Lambton died in Cap-d'Ail on 11 October 1936.

Military offices
| Preceded by Henry Wilson | GOC 4th Division; 1915–1917 | Succeeded by Torquhil Matheson |
