= Felling Male Voice Choir =

FMVC in 2007

== History ==
Felling Male Voice Choir was established in 1920 and is based in Felling, Gateshead, in the North East of England. The choir performs throughout the region and also undertakes national and international tours, and has won several major awards.

The choir has its roots in the Methodist Church and promotes male voice singing by developing an increasingly wide repertoire. With music from Palestrina to modern classics.

In 2010 the choir celebrated its 90th year in a joint concert with the Reg Vardy Band.

=== Notable concerts ===
- October 2008: Celebrity Concert with Sir Thomas Allen (at Sage Gateshead)

=== Competition successes ===
The choir has the unique honour of winning the choral competition at the 1951 Festival of Britain.

== The choir today ==
FMVC has a membership of around 80 members, ranging in age from 20s upwards. Their current director of music is Mark Edwards.

=== Repertoire ===
- The Long Day Closes
- The Caller
- Cullercoats Bay
- I'm Gonna Sing

== Discography ==
- Ain't Got Time to Die (1973)
- Home and Away
- Rejoice with Felling
- Voices of the Tyne (1981)
- Voices of the North
- Chart Toppers (2006)
- Keep Your Feet Still Geordie Hinny! (2006)
- Christmas with Felling (2010)
