= Frederick Lambton, 4th Earl of Durham =

British politician

Member of Parliament for South East Durham
- In office 1900–1910

Member of Parliament for South Durham
- In office 1880–1885

Personal details
- Born: 19 June 1855
- Died: 31 January 1929 (aged 73)
- Party: Liberal Unionist (after 1885)
- Other political affiliations: Liberal (until 1885)
- Spouse: Beatrix Bulteel (m. 1879)
- Children: 6, including John
- Parent: George Lambton (father)
- Relatives: John Lambton (twin brother); Hedworth Lambton (brother); George Lambton (brother); William Lambton (brother)
- Military career
- Rank: Lieutenant
- Unit: Coldstream Guards

Frederick William Lambton, 4th Earl of Durham (19 June 1855 – 31 January 1929) was a British hereditary peer and a Liberal (later Liberal Unionist) politician.

== Early life and education ==
Lambton was the second son of George Lambton, 2nd Earl of Durham and his wife Lady Beatrix Frances Hamilton, daughter of James Hamilton, 1st Duke of Abercorn.

He gained the rank of Lieutenant in the Coldstream Guards.

== Political career ==
Lambton was elected at the 1880 general election as a Liberal Member of Parliament (MP) for South Durham, 384 and held that seat until the constituency was abolished for the 1885 general election. He did not stand in 1885, but having joined the Liberal unionists in 1885 he unsuccessfully contested Berwick-Upon-Tweed in 1886, Sunderland in 1892, and a by-election in South East Durham in February 1898.

He was returned to the House of Commons after a fifteen-year absence at the 1900 general election, when he defeated Joseph Richardson, the Liberal winner of the 1898 by-election. Lambton was re-elected unopposed in 1906, but lost the seat by a wide margin to a Liberal candidate in January 1910.

Lambton inherited the earldom and a seat in the House of Lords from his twin brother, John Lambton, 3rd Earl of Durham, on 18 September 1928 when the latter died with no legitimate children.

== Marriage and children ==
Lambton married Beatrix Bulteel (1859 – 27 April 1937), his second cousin once removed, on 26 May 1879. They had six children:

- Lady Violet Lambton (3 July 1880 – 22 February 1976), married John Egerton, 4th Earl of Ellesmere and had issue including John Egerton, 6th Duke of Sutherland.
- Lady Lilian Lambton (8 December 1881 – 26 September 1966), married Charles Douglas-Home, 13th Earl of Home and had issue including Prime Minister Alec Douglas-Home.
- John Frederick Lambton, 5th Earl of Durham (7 October 1884 – 4 February 1970)
- Hon Geoffrey Lambton (13 September 1887 – 1 September 1914), married Dorothy Leyland and had issue.
- Hon Claud Lambton (3 December 1888 – 7 September 1976), married Olive Eleanor Lockwood and had issue.
- Lady Joan Katherine Lambton (21 September 1893 – 4 January 1967), married Hugh Joicey, 3rd Baron Joicey and had issue.

== Death ==
Lord Durham died on 31 January 1929 at the age of 73, having held the earldom for only 4 months, and was succeeded in the title by his elder son, John.

Parliament of the United Kingdom
Preceded by Frederick Edward Blackett Beaumont; Joseph Whitwell Pease	Member of Parliament for South Durham; 1880 – 1885; With: Joseph Whitwell Pease	Constituency abolished
Preceded by Joseph Richardson	Member of Parliament for South East Durham; 1900 – January 1910	Succeeded by Evan Hayward
Peerage of the United Kingdom
Preceded by John Lambton	Earl of Durham; 1928–1929	Succeeded by John Lambton
