= John Lambton, 3rd Earl of Durham =

British peer (1855–1928)

The Right Honourable The Earl of Durham KG GCVO PC
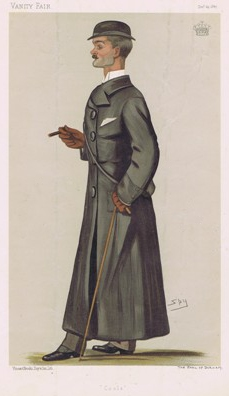
- "Coals"; The Earl of Durham as caricatured by Spy (Leslie Ward) in Vanity Fair, December 1887

Lord High Steward
- In office 9 November 1911 – 5 February 1912
- Monarch: George V
- Prime Minister: H. H. Asquith
- Preceded by: The Duke of Northumberland (1911 Cornonation)
- Succeeded by: The Marquess of Salisbury (1937 Cornonation)

Personal details
- Born: 19 June 1855
- Died: 18 September 1928 (aged 73)
- Spouse: Ethel Elizabeth Louisa Milner (m. 1882)
- Parent(s): George Lambton, 2nd Earl of Durham; Lady Beatrix Hamilton

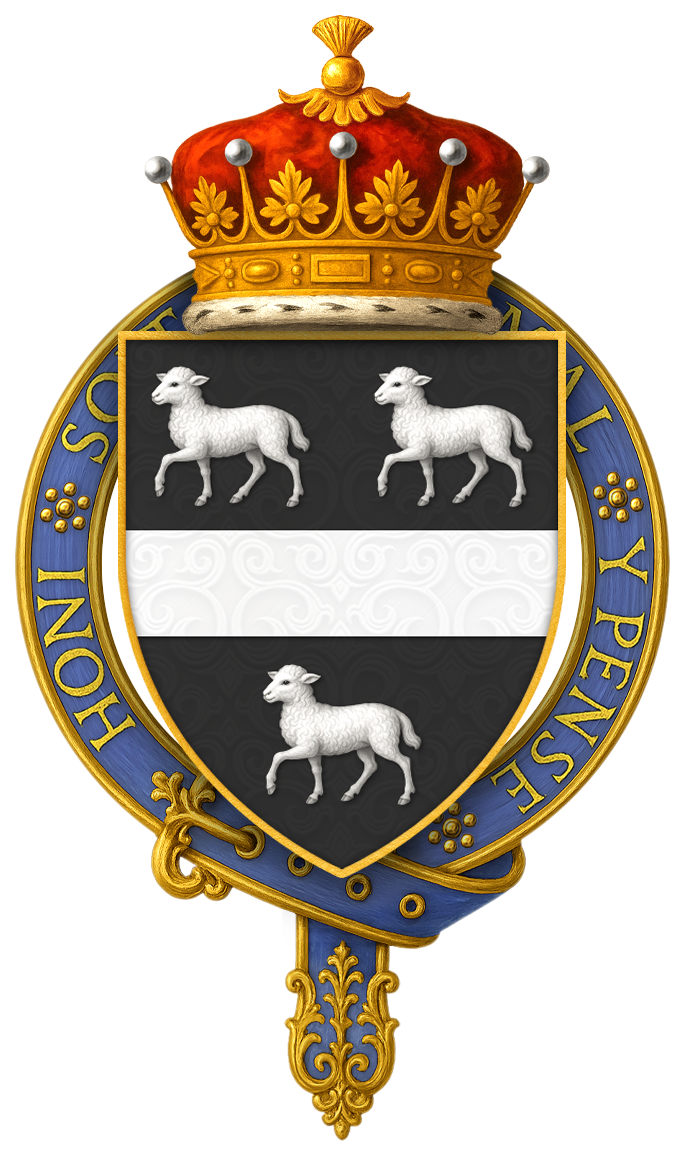
Garter-encircled arms of John Lambton, 3rd Earl of Durham, KG, GCVO, PC

John George Lambton, 3rd Earl of Durham (19 June 1855 – 18 September 1928), known as Viscount Lambton until 1879, was a British hereditary peer.

== Early life ==
Durham was the eldest twin son of George Lambton, 2nd Earl of Durham and his wife Lady Beatrix Frances Hamilton, daughter of James Hamilton, 1st Duke of Abercorn. His grandfather was the statesman and colonial administrator, John Lambton, 1st Earl of Durham and his great-grandfather was Prime Minister Charles Grey, 2nd Earl Grey. He inherited the earldom and its subsidiary titles on 27 November 1879 upon the death of his father.

== Military service ==
As a young man Durham served as a lieutenant in the Coldstream Guards and later became Honorary Colonel of the Durham Heavy Brigade, Royal Artillery, the 6th Battalion Northumberland Fusiliers and the 8th Battalion Durham Light Infantry. He was awarded the Volunteer Officers Decoration on 6 February 1903.

== Later life ==
Lord Durham visited British India to attend the 1903 Delhi Durbar held in January 1903 to celebrate the succession of King Edward VII as Emperor of India. He was made a Knight Companion of the Garter in 1909 and admitted to the Privy Council in 1911. He bore the Queen Consort's Ivory Rod with Dove at the coronation of George V and Mary in 1911 and was Lord High Steward to George V during his visit to India from 1911 to 1912.

Lord Durham served as Lord-Lieutenant of County Durham from 1884 to 1928 and from 1919 to 1928 he was Chancellor of the University of Durham.

== Marriage and children ==
Lord Durham married Ethel Elizabeth Louisa Milner, daughter of Henry Beilby William Milner, in 1882. The marriage was childless and Lady Durham was committed to a mental institution for most of her adult life. She died in 1931.

In 1892 Lord Durham had a son, John R H Rudge, out of wedlock with the actress and dancer Letitia Elizabeth Rudge, known professionally as Letty Lind, whom he could not marry because his wife's illness prevented a divorce. He and Lind were together for many years until her death in 1923.

== Death ==
Lord Durham died in September 1928, at the age of 73, and was succeeded in the earldom and other titles by his younger twin brother, Frederick.

Honorary titles
| Preceded by The Marquess of Londonderry | Lord Lieutenant of Durham; 1884–1928 | Succeeded by The Marquess of Londonderry |
Academic offices
| Preceded by The Duke of Northumberland | Chancellor of the University of Durham; 1919–1928 | Succeeded by The Duke of Northumberland |
Peerage of the United Kingdom
| Preceded by George Lambton | Earl of Durham; 1879–1928 | Succeeded by Frederick Lambton |
