= Antony Lambton =

British politician (1922–2006)

Tony Lambton
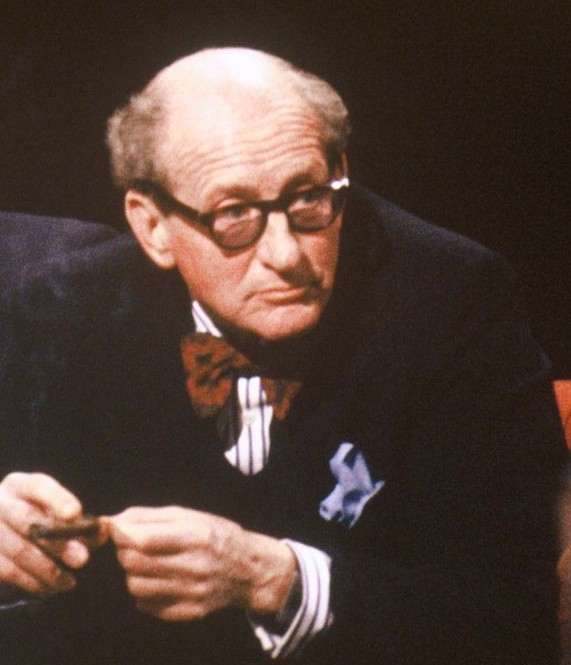
- Lambton in 1991

Member of Parliament for Berwick-upon-Tweed
- In office 25 October 1951 – 22 May 1973
- Preceded by: Robert Thorp
- Succeeded by: Alan Beith

Personal details
- Born: Antony Claud Frederick Lambton; 10 July 1922 Compton, Sussex, England
- Died: 30 December 2006 (aged 84) Siena, Italy
- Party: Conservative
- Spouse: Belinda Blew-Jones (m. 1942; died 2003)
- Children: 6
- Parent(s): John Lambton, 5th Earl of Durham; Diana Mary Farquhar
- Relatives: Alec Douglas-Home (cousin)
- Education: Harrow School

Military service
- Branch/service: British Army
- Unit: Royal Hampshire Regiment

Antony Claud Frederick Lambton (10 July 1922 – 30 December 2006), also known as Lord Lambton or Tony Lambton, was a British aristocrat who served as a Conservative Member of Parliament from 1951 to 1973. Styled as Viscount Lambton from 1941 to 1970, he became The 6th Earl of Durham in February 1970 but disclaimed the title soon after. As a result of a sex scandal in 1973, he resigned from Parliament and ministerial office, moving to Italy and living there until his death.

== Early life and education ==
Antony Claud Frederick Lambton was born on 10 July 1922 in Compton, Sussex, the second son of Diana Mary (née Farquhar) and John Lambton, 5th Earl of Durham. He grew up on the family estates centred around Lambton Castle near Washington in County Durham, actually living at the nearby Biddick Hall. He was a cousin of Sir Alec Douglas-Home.

He was educated at Harrow School and served in the Royal Hampshire Regiment during the Second World War, before being invalided out. He then did war work in a Wallsend factory.

== Political career ==
=== Member of Parliament ===
Lambton first stood for Parliament at the 1945 general election in the safe Labour seat of Chester-le-Street, then Bishop Auckland in 1950. He was elected to Durham City Council and to Durham County Council in 1947, serving for two years. He was elected Member of Parliament for Berwick-upon-Tweed in 1951, where he served until 1973.

=== Under-Secretary of State ===
In 1970, Lambton was made a Parliamentary Under-Secretary of State for Defence (RAF). He succeeded to the Earldom of Durham upon his father's death on 4 February 1970 but disclaimed it on 23 February to continue as an MP and Government Minister. He nonetheless insisted on being addressed as 'Lord Lambton', the form of address appropriate to his former courtesy title. However, a ruling of the Committee for Privileges said that he should not do so in the House of Commons, since he had renounced his peerage titles. Contradictory rulings from two Speakers, Horace King and Selwyn Lloyd, then left the point unresolved.

=== Scandal and resignation ===
In 1973, Lambton's liaisons with prostitutes were revealed in the Sunday tabloid The News of the World. The husband of one of the prostitutes, Norma Levy, had secretly taken photographs of Lord Lambton in bed with Levy and had attempted to sell the photographs to Fleet Street tabloids. A police search of Lambton's home found a small amount of cannabis. On 22 May, Lambton resigned from both his office and Parliament; this caused a by-election for his seat which was won by Alan Beith for the Liberal Party. Shortly after, the name Jellicoe emerged in connection to a rendezvous for one of Norma's girls at a Somers Town mansion block which had been named Jellicoe House, after the earl's kinsman Basil Jellicoe (1899–1935), the housing reformer and priest from Magdalen College (Oxford). There was a confusion and Lord Jellicoe, the Lord Privy Seal and Leader of the House of Lords, admitted 'casual affairs' with prostitutes from a Mayfair escort agency but denied knowing Norma Levy.

== Marriage and children ==
On 10 August 1942, Lambton married Belinda Bridget "Bindy" Blew-Jones (23 December 1921 – 13 February 2003). She was the daughter of Major Douglas Holden Blew-Jones and his wife Violet Hilda Margaret Birkin.

They had five daughters and one son:

- Lady Lucinda Lambton (born 10 May 1943)
- Lady Beatrix Mary Lambton (born 23 July 1949)
- Lady Rose Diana Lambton (26 November 1952 - 5 April 2022)
- Lady Anne Mary Gabrielle Lambton (born 4 July 1954)
- Lady Isabella Lambton (born 17 May 1958), married to Sir Philip Naylor-Leyland, 4th Baronet
- Edward Richard Lambton, 7th Earl of Durham (born 19 October 1961)

== Later life and death ==
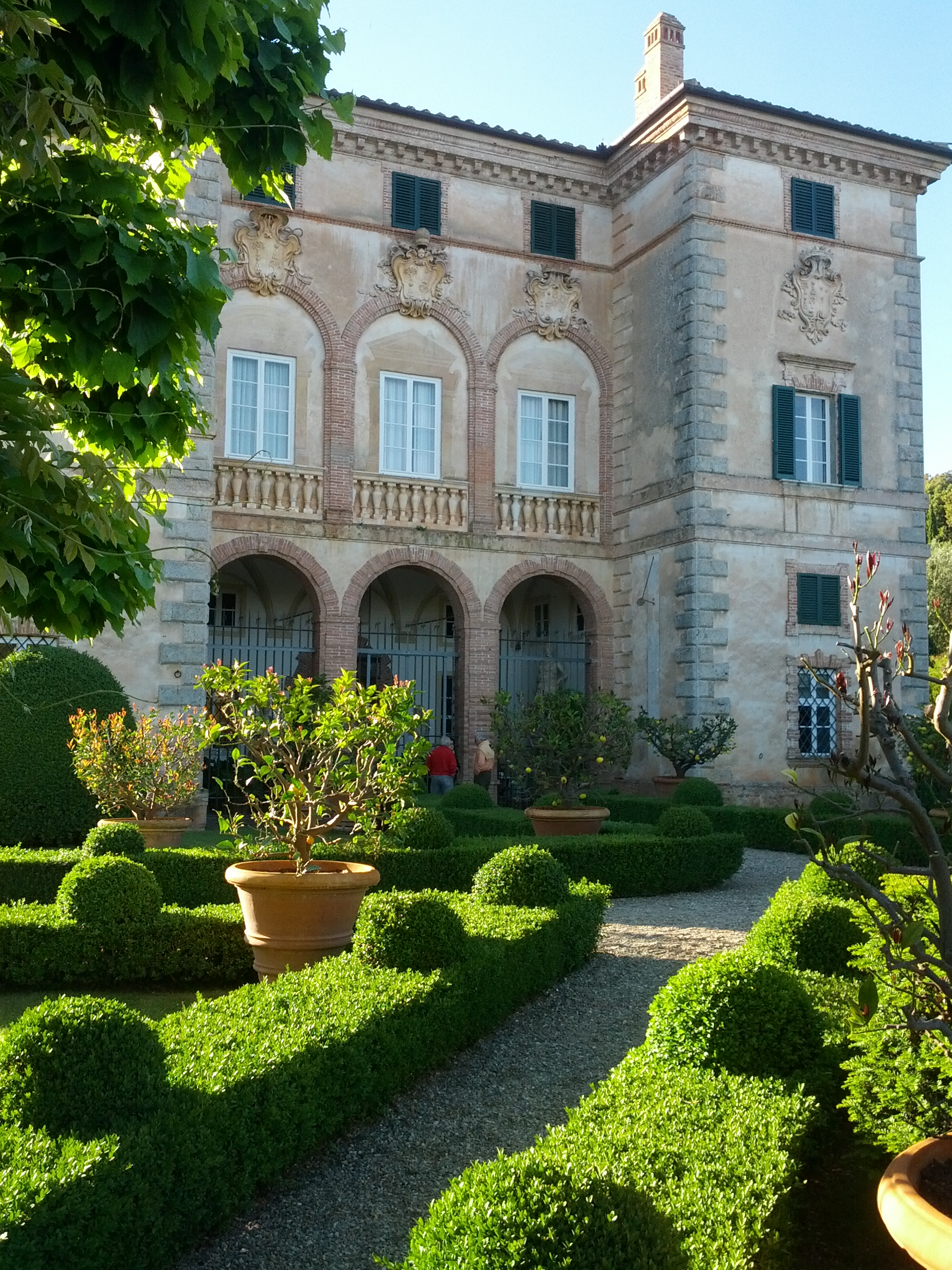
For the last three decades of his life, Lambton spent his energies restoring Villa Cetinale in Tuscany

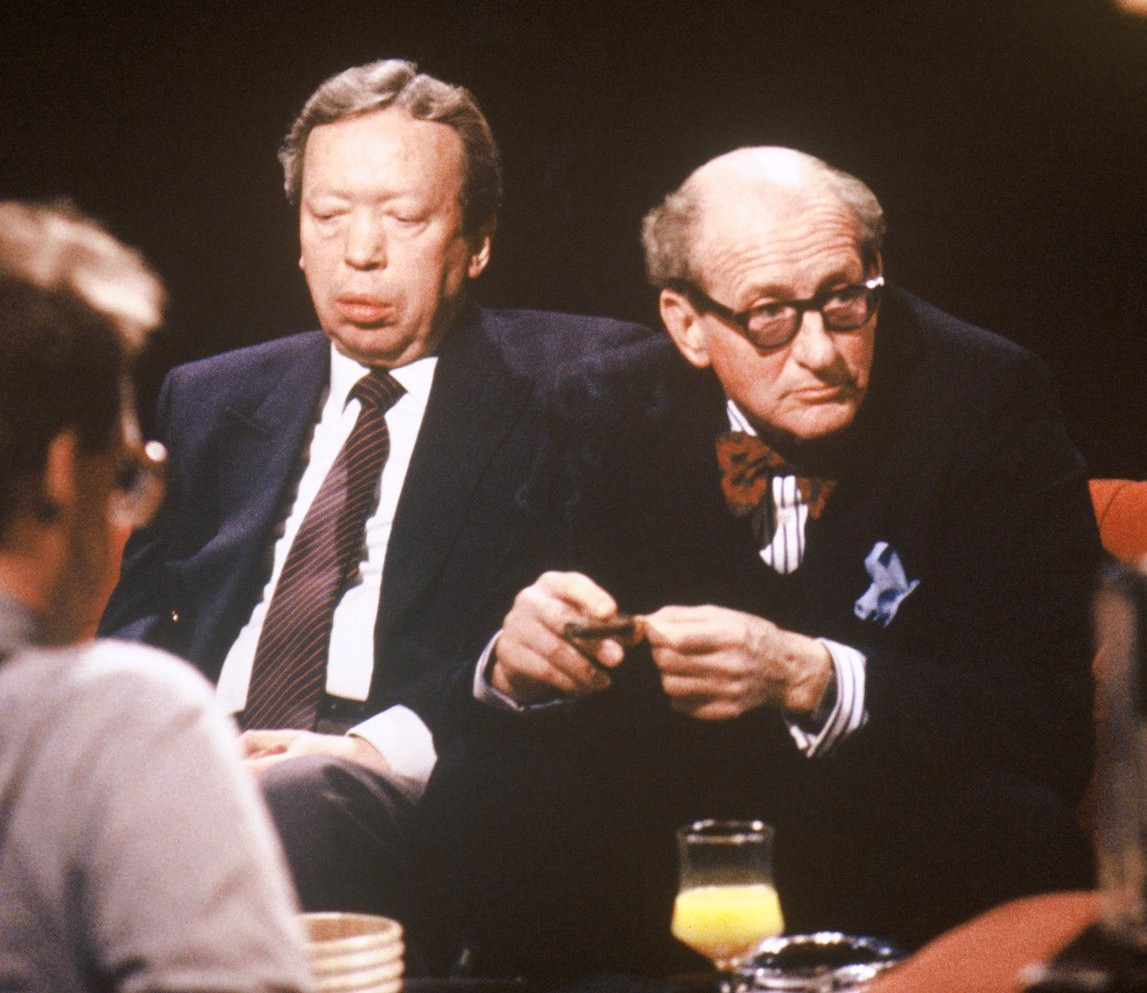
On After Dark in 1991 (on the right), sitting beside Anthony Howard

Following the scandal, Lambton retired, separated from his wife, and bought Villa Cetinale, a 17th-century villa in Tuscany, where he lived with Claire Ward (born Claire Leonora Baring), mother of actress Rachel Ward and daughter of the cricketer Giles Baring.

In 1991, Lambton made an extended appearance on the TV discussion programme After Dark, chaired by Helena Kennedy, alongside Duncan Campbell, Jane Moore, Clare Short, Anthony Howard and others.

Despite renouncing his peerage titles in 1970, he continued to use his former courtesy title of Viscount Lambton. However, since it was now a title that had passed by courtesy to his only son, it was argued by Garter Principal King of Arms Sir Anthony Wagner and others that it was incorrect of Lambton to use the title.

On 30 December 2006, Lambton died in hospital in Siena, Italy.

Parliament of the United Kingdom
Preceded by Robert Thorp	Member of Parliament for Berwick-upon-Tweed; 1951 – 1973	Succeeded by Alan Beith
Peerage of the United Kingdom
Preceded by John Lambton	Earl of Durham; 4 February 1970 – 23 February 1970	Disclaimed Title next held by Edward Lambton
