= John Lambton, 5th Earl of Durham =

English peer

- Born: 7 October 1884
- Died: 4 February 1970 (aged 85)
- Spouse(s): Diana Farquhar (m. 1919; died 1924) Hermione Bullough (m. 1931)
- Children: 3, including Antony
- Father: Frederick Lambton
- Military career
- Rank: Captain
- Unit: Royal Northumberland Fusiliers
- Wars: World War I

John Frederick Lambton, 5th Earl of Durham (7 October 1884 – 4 February 1970), briefly styled Viscount Lambton between 1928 and 1929, was a British hereditary peer. Through his sister Lilian, he was an uncle of future Prime Minister Sir Alec Douglas-Home. Lord Durham is best remembered for the donation of Penshaw Monument to the National Trust.

== Early life and education ==
Durham was born on 7 October 1884, the elder son of Frederick Lambton, 4th Earl of Durham and his wife Beatrix Bulteel. He was educated at Eton. He succeeded to the earldom and subsidiary titles upon the death of his father on 31 January 1929.

== Military service ==
Lambton was commissioned a second lieutenant in the 5th (Militia) Battalion, Royal Northumberland Fusiliers, on 4 February 1903. Durham fought in the First World War as a captain in the 3rd/7th Battalion, Royal Northumberland Fusiliers and was wounded in action.

== Marriages and children ==
Durham was married firstly on 12 November 1919 to Diana Mary Farquhar (19 July 1901 – 28 August 1924). They had two sons:

- John Roderick Geoffrey Francis Edward Lambton, Viscount Lambton (6 September 1920 – 4 February 1941), committed suicide by shooting himself.
- Antony Claud Frederick Lambton, 6th Earl of Durham (10 July 1922 – 30 December 2006)

After the death of his first wife, Durham was married secondly on 4 March 1931 to Hermione Bullough, daughter of Sir George Bullough, 1st Baronet. They had one son:

- Hon John George Lambton (10 June 1932 – 21 August 2012)

== Death ==
Lord Durham died on 4 February 1970, at the age of 85. He was succeeded in the earldom and subsidiary titles by his second but eldest surviving son Antony, who disclaimed the title soon after.

Peerage of the United Kingdom
Preceded by Frederick William Lambton	Earl of Durham; 1929–1970	Succeeded by Antony Claud Frederick Lambton
