= John McKendry =

Canadian museum curator

- Born: John Joseph McKendry; January 5, 1933; Calgary, Canada
- Died: June 23, 1975 (aged 42); New York City, U.S.
- Occupation: Curator
- Known for: Curator of prints and photographs at the Metropolitan Museum of Art
- Spouse: Maxime de La Falaise (m. 1967)

John Joseph McKendry (January 5, 1933 – June 23, 1975) was a Canadian museum curator. He served as curator of prints and photographs at the Metropolitan Museum of Art in New York from 1967 until his death. During his tenure, he played an important role in expanding the museum's photography collection and acquiring works by modern and contemporary photographers. McKendry and his wife, designer and food writer Maxime de La Falaise, were associated with the New York art and fashion worlds of the 1960s and 1970s.

== Early life and education ==
John Joseph McKendry was born in Calgary, Alberta on January 5, 1933. He grew up in Calgary in a working-class family. His Irish-born father was a Catholic Communist who worked as a gardener for a dollar a day. Photographs of Joseph Stalin and the pope hung in the family living room, while conversations at dinner often centered on strikes and labor disputes.

McKendry studied at the University of Alberta, graduating in 1958, and subsequently attended the Institute of Fine Arts in New York, where he graduated in 1961.

Fellow student Allen Rosenbaum, who later became director of the Princeton University Art Museum, recalled McKendry's fascination with New York's wealth and glamour. Rosenbaum compared him to Paul, the protagonist of Willa Cather's Paul's Case, who is similarly captivated by the city's sophistication. McKendry reportedly spent hours outside the Plaza Hotel watching women in furs and diamonds arrive and depart. "My father believes in Labour and the Catholic Church," McKendry told Interview. "I believe in neither. I believe in the very rich."

== Career ==
McKendry joined the Metropolitan Museum of Art as a fellow in museum training and joined the staff of the Department of Prints in 1961. In 1966, the museum's Bulletin identified him as "Associate Curator in Charge of Prints." In 1967, McKendry became curator of prints and photographs.

Photographer Bruce Davidson photographed McKendry at the Metropolitan Museum in 1968; several of Davidson's photographs of McKendry are now in the museum's collection.

The museum's photography collection, which had grown from earlier gifts and acquisitions, continued to grow substantially during the period McKendry oversaw the department. He often traveled to Paris and London to acquire prints, photographs, etchings, books, architectural drawings from booksellers and dealers. In the March 1969 issue of the Metropolitan Museum's Bulletin devoted to photography, it was reported that the museum's collection as having grown to almost 5,000 photographs.

Among the exhibitions McKendry organized were shows of photographs by Edward Weston, Paul Strand, and Man Ray. Other exhibitions he arranged included The World's Fairs—Architecture of Fantasy (1964), Visionary Architects: The Drawings of Boullée, Ledoux and Lequeu (1968), and One Hundred Years of the Print Department: A Survey of Acquisitions During the Museum's First Century (1970).

McKendry wrote, among other works, Aesop—Five Centuries of Illustrated Fables (1964), Victorian Photographs (1968), Robert Motherwell: À la peinture (1972), and Helen Frankenthaler: Sixty-Two Painted Book Covers (1973). He also contributed to numerous art periodicals.

== Personal life ==
McKendry was a member of the Grolier Club and the Print Council of America.

McKendry was known for his flamboyant personal style and his connections with artists, photographers, writers, and figures in New York's cultural scene. He became acquainted with poet and singer Patti Smith through Robert Mapplethorpe when they were young artists in New York. In her memoir Just Kids (2010), Smith recalled McKendry's ebullient, curious, and affectionate personality, as well as his struggles with self-esteem. She described him as a "pale and wispy Victorian boy" and compared him to John, one of the Lost Boys in Peter Pan.

McKendry and his wife, Maxime de la Falaise, supported Smith's emerging career, sponsoring her poetry readings at their apartment. In a 1976 interview with Maxime, Smith called McKendry "the first classy person I ever met" and credited him and Maxime with introducing her to a more sophisticated social world. She admired McKendry's wide-ranging interests, recalling that he discussed rock and roll with the same seriousness as photography and art. Smith said they could "talk about Artaud and Keith Richards in the same breath," adding that "anything that was passionate or beautiful seemed to be the same to John."

=== Marriage to Maxime de la Falaise ===
In 1967, McKendry married fashion designer Maxime de la Falaise, daughter of the English portraitist Sir Oswald Birley, and the former wife of Comte Alain de La Falaise. They had been introduced by her daughter, Loulou de la Falaise, who was married to McKendry's friend Desmond FitzGerald, 29th Knight of Glin, then a curator of furniture at the Victoria and Albert Museum in London. The couple became part of New York's interconnected social and artistic circles.

They lived on Jane Street in the West Village before moving to 190 Riverside Drive on the Upper West Side. In the 1970s, Maxime, then a food editor at Vogue, was writing Seven Hundred Years of English Cooking (1973), and frequently hosted dinner parties featuring unusual historical recipes. McKendry was described to have "presided over these dinners like Lewis Carroll's Mad Hatter." In 1975, Maxime said, "Although we have a very independent marriage, we have a fantastic relationship."

=== Relationship with Robert Mapplethorpe ===
McKendry became closely associated with photographer Robert Mapplethorpe, whom he met on July 3, 1971, at a medieval-themed dinner hosted by McKendry and Maxime. Introduced by David Croland, McKendry quickly bonded with Mapplethorpe and became an early supporter of his work. Mapplethorpe was fascinated by the McKendrys and began dining at their apartment several times a week, sometimes accompanied by Smith. According to Boaz Mazor, assistant to Oscar de la Renta, "John McKendry opened the door for him. He saw the potential in Robert Mapplethorpe when none of us saw it."

In September 1971, McKendry invited Mapplethorpe to accompany him on a trip to London. McKendry introduced him to members of high society describing him as a "brilliant young artist and photographer." McKendry encouraged Mapplethorpe to photograph members of the British aristocracy, envisioning him as a successor to Cecil Beaton. During the three-week visit, Mapplethorpe photographed McKendry in the bathtub of his step-son Alexis de la Falaise's farmhouse in Wales.

Although they had a sexual encounter while in London, McKendry's feelings for Mapplethorpe was not reciprocated. He continued to support Mapplethorpe financially and for Christmas in 1971, he gave him a Polaroid camera, providing him with his first reliable camera. In a letter written several days later, Mapplethorpe thanked McKendry and Maxime for helping him through a difficult period and expressed his growing confidence in his work. At the time, Mapplethorpe produced collages and assemblages alongside his photography, including two Joseph Cornell-inspired boxes that he made for the McKendrys.

McKendry fostered Mapplethorpe's development as a photographer by providing him access to the Metropolitan Museum of Art's private collection, where he could study photographs that had not been publicly exhibited. Curator Henry Geldzahler later recalled that McKendry "taught Robert about photography in the best possible way." In April 1972, McKendry took Mapplethorpe to Boston to meet executives at the Polaroid Corporation, which had recently established a program providing artists with free film. McKendry's mood swings affected their friendship and Mapplethorpe increasingly withdrew from him. Although they remained friends, by the summer of 1972 Mapplethorpe had begun receiving support from collector Sam Wagstaff, who soon became his patron and partner.

Photographs that Mapplethorpe took of McKendry in 1975, shortly before his death are now held by the Metropolitan Museum of Art and the National Galleries of Scotland.

== Death ==
McKendry died from cirrhosis of the liver at the age of 42 at St. Clare's Hospital in New York City on June 23, 1975. He was survived by his wife Maxime de la Falaise, his mother Mary McKendry, two sisters, and three brothers.

Hiss funeral service was held at St. Thomas More Church in New York City on June 30, 1975.
