= Siege of Glin Castle =

- Part of the Nine Years' War
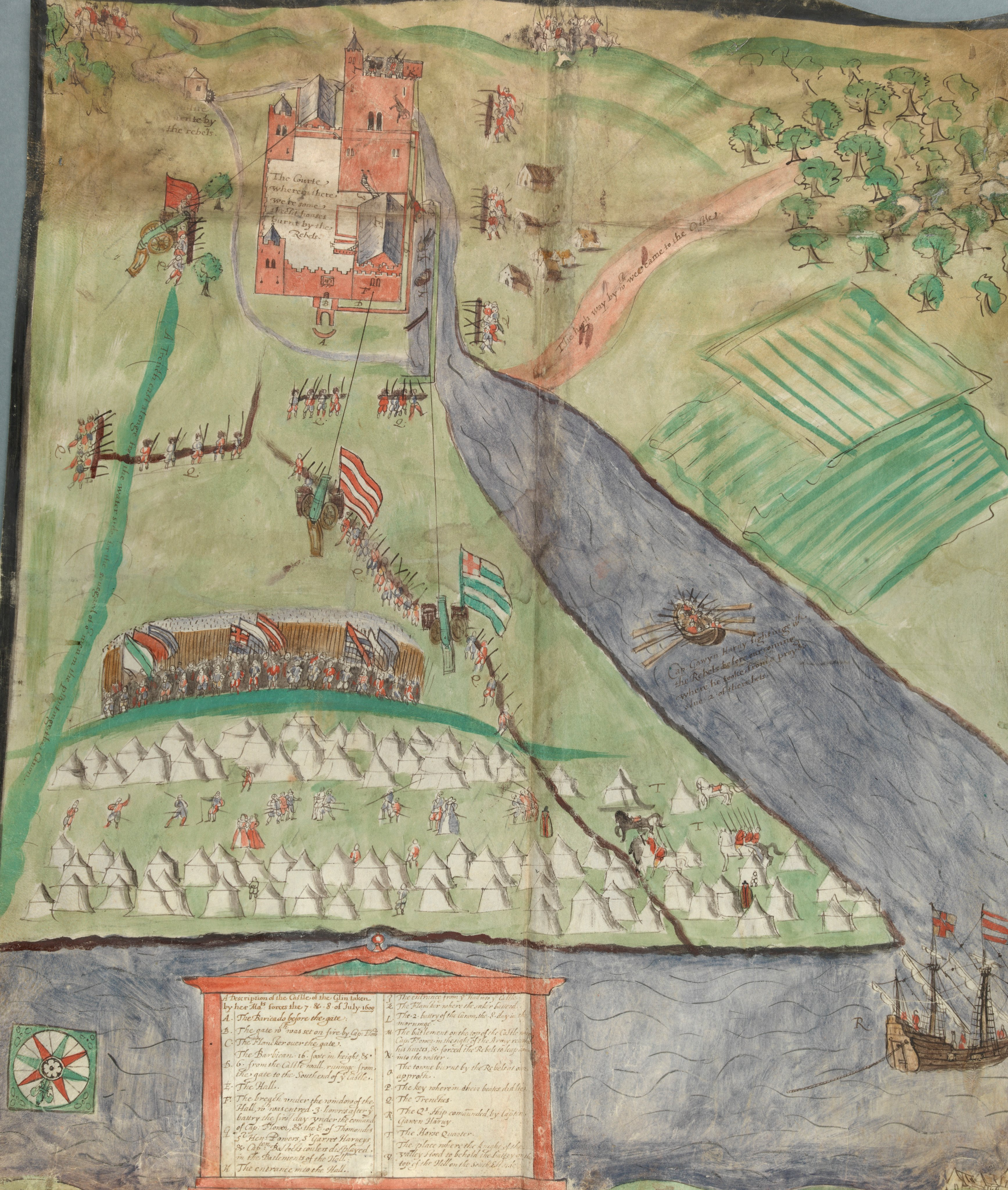
- Contemporaneous map depicting the siege (1600)
| Date | 5–9 July 1600 |
| Location | Glin Castle, Ireland |
| Result | Crown victory |

Belligerents
| Kingdom of England: Kingdom of Ireland | Forces of the Knight of Glin |

Commanders and leaders
| George Carew (Kingdom of Ireland) Earl of Thomond | Knight of Glin (observer); Unnamed Constable †; Donall na Searrach Culhane †; Tadhg Dore † |

Strength
| 800 foot 60 horse (Note: Description of Carew's Army near the siege in Pacata Hibernia, https://archive.org/details/pacatahiberniao02totngoog/page/n168/mode/2up?q=O%27DorinoII&view=theater) | c. 86 man garrison (Note: See note 4.) |

Casualties and losses
| 11 killed 21 wounded (Note: Casualties of this service cited in Pacata Hibernia.) | 80 killed 1 surrendered 5 escaped (Note: 80 killed according to Pacata Hibernia. 2 escaped at midnight according to Pacata Hibernia before the final assault, 3 escaped jumping from the castle walls into the water according to Culhane (1998). 1 said to have surrendered before final assault in Pacata Hibernia) |

The siege of Glin Castle was undertaken between the 5th and 9th of July 1600 by the newly appointed Lord President of Munster, George Carew (assisted by the Earl of Thomond), in his summer campaign against the followers of James FitzThomas FitzGerald (The Súgan Earl), who had risen up against the English settlers during Tyrone's rebellion and laid claim to the title of Earl of Desmond. Among his allies was Edmund Fitzthomas Fitzgerald (known as Eamonn na gCath), Knight of Glin.

The Súgan Earl's large army, which numbered up to 3,000 men had shadowed Carew's force on their progress to Glin and watched them closely upon their preparation of the siege but did not intervene due to disunity in their ranks. Thus the siege was permitted to proceed along normal lines with Carew's camp uninterrupted in their preparations after their arrival on the 5th of July.

On the 7th of July, the Knight met with his relative, the Earl of Thomond who attempted to persuade him to order the castle's surrender, being shown the array of cannons and informed that Carew intended to execute his young son whom he held hostage. The Knight refused and left the camp to watch the siege from a vantage point, perhaps overestimating the Castle's defencability against cannon and expecting Desmond's army to relieve the siege. Final negotiations between the castle's constable and Thomond that evening were unfruitful.

The following morning (the 8th) the attack commenced (after a final offer of surrender with the knight's son strapped to the demi cannon) and the castle was bombarded with cannon and small shot, the demi-cannon breached the castle vault and the castle's main hall and turrets were secured by night time with the defenders being driven into the castle keep. The same night there was an abortive escape attempt from here and the ward were driven back inside with the constable being slain in this action.

On the morning of the 9th of July, a final assault was launched on the castle's keep. The defenders had retreated up to the castle battlements and were slaughtered there with many attempting to jump from the roof into the water surrounding it and few escaping. After this, Carew spent the next five days rebuilding the castle and had it garrisoned by 20 men under Captain Nicholas Mordant. A later attempt to recapture the castle by the rebels in August was unsuccessful.

== Background ==
Some of the Old English from Munster, notably Edmund fitz Thomas FitzGerald (Knight of Glin), joined Hugh O'Neill's cause under the leadership of James FitzThomas FitzGerald, the Sugan Earl, encouraged by O'Neill's victory over the royal army at the Battle of the Yellow Ford in 1598. These Old English needed little encouragement because they were already under intense pressure from the English settlers and had vivid memories of the recent destruction and planting of their region. They expelled these newcomers and briefly took over control of some of Munster. In County Limerick, they mainly concentrated their forces. When the lord president, Sir Thomas Norris, who was in Kilmallock, realized he couldn't defeat them, he fled to Cork. A list of the commanders of this Third Desmond uprising was immediately provided to the English authorities by an informant by the name of Owen Moriarty. "Florence McCarthy, James Fitz Thomas, the White Knight, McDonogh, O'Sullivan Beare, the knight of Kerry, the knight of the Valley, and others," he said. Carew had previously written to the privy council claiming the Knights of Glin and Kerry had importuned to be received into queen's favour and if they did not continue on this path it was due to the influence of Florence McCarthy. (brother-in-law of Edmond)

After Sir George Carew was named lord president of Munster, their successes came to an end. At the end of April 1600, he made his way to Cork. He was a master of intrigue, and offered Dermot O'Connor, the mercenaries of Connacht's leader, £1,000 and other favors in exchange for the Sugan earl's delivery. The Sugan earl was deceitfully taken prisoner by O'Connor, who then transported him to Castleishon "in the great wood of Connello." Fitzmaurice of Lixnaw, Pierce Lacy, and Edmund Fitz Thomas all worked together to foil Carew's scheme. Before Carew or his soldiers arrived, they attacked Castleishon with roughly 4,000 supporters and saved the Sugan earl. They attacked Castleishon with some 4,000 supporters before Carew or his army showed there, saving the Sugan earl. Carew succeeded in fostering discord among those arrayed against him through intrigue. The Sugan earl also showed himself to be an inept leader. The behaviour of the earl and his supporters during the siege and conquest of Glin Castle in July 1600 made clear this, the absence of a larger strategy, and their lack of cohesion.

== Preparations ==
The most important victory in Carew's 1600 summer campaign was the seizure of Glin Castle. In late May, while traveling from Cork to Limerick, he first took Bruff Castle. He then took Croom Castle in June. When the English army approached, the garrison left the fortress with a "great store of corn and provisions." Carew then marched on Glin after departing Askeaton on July 4 with an army of 800 foot soldiers and 80 horsemen. Carew and his soldiers travelled 20 miles via Ballintore on Sliabh Luachra, passing while being watched by the forces of the Sugan earl, whose camp was close to Athea. However, Carew and his forces were only attacked once, near Ballyhahill, as they were going through a marsh. Carew had the locals, including old women and children, massacred as retaliation for the death of some of his troops.

The soldiers of Glin Castle demolished a number of thatched homes nearby in what was known as Mill Street as Carew drew closer. The Sugan earl and his supporters had set up on a position around Ballyguiltenane on the hills overlooking the castle when Carew arrived at Glin at noon on July 5. It appeared that they were planning to assault the lord president and his soldiers when they sought to take the fortress. The Sugan earl's forces were sizable, totaling over 3,000 according to Carew and closer to 1,600 according to Irish accounts. Carew disregarded them and proceeded to set up a siege on Glin Castle, most likely because he was aware of the severe division among the forces of the Sugan earl. From the south-west, he approached the fortress and quickly surrounded it with his soldiers. There they found Gawen Harvey at anchor (he had fought off the rebels for the previous two weeks and had killed two) before the Castle (on the Shannon Estuary) with their ordnance. This was made up of one or two Sacre cannons, one large Demi-cannon, as well as numerous small arms. The army was encamped and the cannons were transported up the river by boats of the Earl of Thomond's and unshipped around the castle. That night they entrenched themselves before the castle, between it and the river.

Early the following day (July 6), he set up a parley with they constable of the beleaguered castle and simultaneous to this (for which purposes the parley was arranged) he planted the demi-cannon and one of the saker cannons on the hill opposite the castle (Knockaranna) and the remaining cannons around the castle.

On the 7th, Edmund fitz Thomas, the knight of Glin, who had been seeing the action from a vantage point at a location known as Tullyglass, dispatched a messenger to Carew's camp requesting for a safe journey. It was approved. There, he met the Earl of Thomond, his relative who was backing Carew. Edmund wanted to meet Carew but Thomond warned him that unless he surrendered absolutely to her majesty's mercy, Carew would not meet with him. Edmund would not do this without certain conditions and was commanded to leave. He was then shown the artillery battery that had been pointed towards the castle in an effort to persuade him to reconsider. He was also permitted to communicate with his six-year-old son, who was Carew's hostage in exchange for his father's allegiance. If the castle garrison refused to surrender, Edmund was notified that it was Carew's intention to have the boy put to death. Edmund again conferred with Thomond but was again resisted Carew's ultimatum to give the castle's capitulation orders and left the camp to watch the progress of the siege from his vantage point. In Pacata Hibernia (1633) the reasons cited for the Knight's refusal to surrender is that he "ignorantly" believed the castle strong enough to resist cannon and believed the Sugan Earl's army would relieve the siege.

On the same day towards the evening the castle's constable sent a messenger to the Earl of Thomond, praying his Lordship to get a safe conduct from the President for permission to meet The Earl and speak to him that evening. After this was granted, he spoke to the Earl, representing to be his 'natural follower' (the constable was Thomond born) and wishing to, in his best interests warn him of the peril he would be in if he joined the siege as "the earl of Desmond and the Connachtmen ... 3,000 strong at least" were "not two miles from this place ..." and would attack Carew's camp upon the commencement of the siege whereupon they would be put to the sword and driven into the River Shannon. The constable's appeal was denied by the earl, and the earl's requests for the constable's surrender were rebuked by him, and he went back to the castle. Carew was so furious after learning about this interaction that he sent a message to the constable that within two days he would have his head set upon a stake.

== The Attack ==
Early the next morning, on 8 July, the gunner found the touch-hole clogged on the demi-cannon, which was timed to commence the attack on the castle with a bombardment. Carew was informed of this situation after the gunner and a smith had failed to clear it. After Carew (being an expert on great artillery) had cleared the hole all was ready for the siege to begin. Carew made one more attempt to get the castle's garrison to give up without a fight before he gave the order to start firing. He had the six-year-old prisoner son of Edmund fastened to the demi-cannon's mouth in full view of the castle's guardians. He then warned the constable that he would blow the boy out of the cannon if he and his companions did not immediately surrender. Clear and defiant, the constable replied (in terms described as indecent by the Pacata Hibernia), "... Gread leat. Ta an ridire go meidhreach fos agus a bhean go briomhar. Ta an phit oscailte fos agus an bod briomhar. Is fuiriste leanbh eile do gheiniuint" ("An answer to you. The knight is virile yet and his wife is strong. The vulva is still open and the penis vigorous. It is easy for them to produce another child"). Carew then ordered the boy to be taken out of the cannon and gave the battery the order to fire.

The eighty-man garrison was split into two sections, one of which was commanded by Donall na Searrach (Daniel of the colts) Culhane, a member of a family who were hereditary constables of Glin Castle, and the other by Tadhg Dore. Twenty-four of the eighty-man garrison, according to Carew, were "natural born followers to the knight of the valley." Their opposition was essentially helpless in light of Carew's cannon. But they anticipated help from the Sugan earl and his troops, who were just two miles from the fortress. Due to disagreements among the Sugan earl's supporters, this assistance never materialized. Later, in a letter to Hugh O'Neill, Edmund claimed that the division was the result of "the sinister dealings of Connacht men," most likely alluding to Dermot O'Connor's actions, who, following his initial betrayal, later rejoined the earl of Desmond's forces. The result of the disagreement was that the siege went on as planned because no assistance was sent to the troops.

The small shot incessantly fired at the castle and the warders hid away. This was until the large cannon made a breachable hole under the vault of the great hall of the castle. This was at the loss of only one man (a cannonier). Captain Flower (thought to be the ancestor of Robin Flower), also referred to in folklore as "An Captaen Riabhach" (the "swarthy captain"), and a chosen group of men entered through the breach and fought their way from a vault into the great hall, forcing the warders into a castle close adjoining it where from out of a spike they killed four soldiers (possibly done by the three Giltenan brothers whom Culhane mentions). Flower then ascended the two turrets above the hall and captured them (during this Captain Bostocks Ensign was slain) and their colours were flown on these turrets. A second assault was led by Turlough Roe MacMahon (father of Maire Ruadh McMahon), of Colmanstown Castle, County Clare. Traditional records claim that MacMahon, who died on June 9, 1629, at the age of 66, was a "bloodthirsty savage." His attack that failed, and subsequent attacks were postponed until the following day. Captain Slingsbie was ordered to keep this position good until morning, meanwhile there was an exchange of some small shot. The constable and the troops made an escape attempt around midnight, seeing no other possibility. The constable was killed in a short engagement (his head was then put on a stake), and with the exception of two who managed to escape, the garrison was driven back inside the castle.

The next morning (9th), a party led by Turlough Roe MacMahon advanced. As they entered the castle keep, they encountered no resistance. They discovered there that the wooden door leading to the tower's narrow stairs was locked. The door was set on fire. the ward was in the Tower of the Castle, where there was no entry except a narrow staircase which no more than one could ascend at once. There was a wooden door at the foot of the stairs which being burnt filled the staircase with smoke making it impassable for two hours. When the smoke cleared a single man presented himself and surrendered. The smoke being vanished a musketeer and to his second a halbadier, followed by Captain Slingsbie, Captain Flower, Lieutenant Power (Lieutenant to Sir Henry Power of Decies), Ensign Power (Sir Henry Power's Ensign), Lieutenant Nevill (Lieutenant to Sir Garratt Harvie) and others who ascended the stairs in file. They found no defenders on the stairs or in any of the upper rooms, for they had all gone to the battlements where they intended to sell their lives dearly.

== Final Assault ==
Carew's men pursued the way to the battlements, whereunto there was but one door; Captain Flower entered upon one hand, and Captain Slingsby on the other; the gutters were very narrow between the roof of the castle and the battlements. In conclusion some were slain in the place and others leaped from the top of the castle into the water underneath it, where our guards killed them.

Thomas F. Culhane, from traditional sources, complements Carew's report of the final stage of the siege as follows:
"The Giltenans, Tadhg Dore, and his brother, and Donall [na Searrach] Culhane and two of his sons were slain in the final defence. Some of the garrison tried to escape by jumping into the water surrounding the castle, but only three men succeeded in getting away. These were Mahon Dillane, Lewy O’Connor and Donall Beag Culhane (whose father was slain in the last defence of the castle)."

In total Stafford (author of Pacata Hibernia) claims eleven of the English soldiers were slain (one being an Ensign), he claims 21 were injured (including a Serjeant Major who received four wounds and Lieutenants of Henry Powers and the Earl of Thomond). He claims 80 of the defenders were killed or almost the entire garrison.

== Aftermath ==
Carew spent five days getting the castle at Glin rebuilt and garrisoned it with 20 soldiers under Captain Nicholas Mordant because he believed it to be of significant strategic value. His tyranny was so severe that the populace finally chose to rebel against him out of desperation. (he was lured into the woods under the pretense the Knight's wife was hiding there and ambushed). He was referred to as "An Famaire Riabhach" (literally, "the swarthy monster"), and ever since, the Glin neighborhood has used his memories to frighten mischievous kids. Carew, recognizing the chastening effect the siege had on the rebels, reported to the privy council on August 25 that "(John) O'Connor) did never send or come into me until the Glan was taken, and two cannon in a boat ready to sail to his castle of Carrigafoyle."

Edmund Fitz Thomas joined forces with Florence McCarthy, Pierce Lacy, and Thomas Fitzmaurice of Lixnaw following the fall of the Glin Castle. They made an unsuccessful attempt to retake Glin Castle before August 25. They were reported to be doing "no harm other than to steal cows" for their men on October 1 after their combined strength had been reduced to around 2,000 fighting men by the end of August.

George Tuchet, Lord Audley, began negotiating to inherit the Glin estate as soon as the Glin Castle was destroyed. A bounty of £100 was placed on the knight's head and he fled north to Ulster and joined Red Hugh O'Donnell. He went south to fight at Kinsale where he was wounded and saved from death by one of his follower's Donough Costelloe, a member of the family which fostered the children of the knights of Glin. After this a general pardon was given by the English to those who had taken part in the rebellion, but Edmond was excluded by name (along with Donal O’Sullivan Beare, Thomas Fitzmaurice of Lixnaw, John O’Connor of Carrigafoyle, Oliver Hussey and others). He hid in the Sliabh Luachra area until 1603 when his estates were restored to him.
