= Maxime de la Falaise =

English model, actress, designer and writer

- Maxime de la Falaise by Clifford Coffin in 1949
- Born: Maxine Birley; 25 June 1922; West Dean, West Sussex, England, UK
- Died: 30 April 2009 (aged 86); Provence, France
- Other name: Maxime McKendry
- Occupations: Model; designer; actress; writer
- Spouses: Count Alain Le Bailly de La Falaise (m. 1946; div. 1950) John McKendry (m. 1967; died 1975)
- Children: Loulou Le Bailly de La Falaise; Alexis Le Bailly de La Falaise
- Parent(s): Sir Oswald Birley; Rhoda Vava Mary Lecky Pike
- Relatives: Mark Birley (brother); Hugh Hornby Birley (2x great-grandfather)

Maxime Le Bailly, comtesse de La Falaise (25 June 1922 – 30 April 2009), was an English model, designer, food writer, and actress. She was also the mother of jewellery designer Loulou de la Falaise.

Born into a prominent English family, Maxime de la Falaise established herself in Paris, where she worked as a "society saleswoman" for Elsa Schiaparelli and modelled for fashion photographers, appearing on the cover of Vogue. She later designed for Schiaparelli, Pucci, and Chloé before opening her own couture house in 1955. Maxime continued designing in New York, where she also contributed to Vogue as a food columnist in the 1970s. She became part of the city's artistic and social circles, and befriended Pop artist Andy Warhol, who brought her into his Factory scene. She also appeared in films associated with Warhol, notably Blood for Dracula (1974). Her writings on food include the books Seven Centuries of English Cooking (1973) and Food in Vogue (1980).

== Early life ==
Maxime de la Falaise was born Maxine Birley on 25 June 1922, in West Dean, Sussex, England. She was the daughter of the portrait painter Oswald Birley and Rhoda Vava Mary Lecky Pike, an Irish artist and horticulturalist. Her younger brother, Mark Birley, later became a restaurateur and founded the London nightclub Annabel's.

The Birley family divided its time between London and Charleston Manor in East Sussex and traveled extensively. She was exposed from an early age to artists, writers, performers, and members of British high society. Her godfather was the French cartoonist Sem. Her mother's interest in gardening and entertaining also influenced the domestic and culinary interests that later became part of her writing career.

When her parents spent months abroad in India and Siam painting royalty, Maxime stayed with her grandparents near Dublin. She received her education at home by governesses and nannies, with the prospect of being sent to school sometimes used as a disciplinary threat. She recalled, "I rarely saw any children. I knew a few boys, no girls. I climbed trees and fought. played rough games. Cowboys and Indians."

At the outbreak of the World War II, Birley initially intended to join the Women's Royal Naval Service but instead joined the Women's Auxiliary Air Force. Because of her fluency in French and aptitude for languages, she was assigned to Bletchley Park, where she worked as a codebreaker at Bletchley Park. She was later discharged from military service after developing kleptomania.

== Career ==
=== Paris: Modelling and designing ===
Her first husband, Count Alain de La Falaise, introduced her to the Parisian salon world. They married in 1946, after which she adopted the name Maxime. They had two children, Loulou and Alexis, before divorcing in 1950.

Maxime met fashion designer Elsa Schiaparelli, whose Paris couture house had reopened after the war. She worked as "society saleswoman" for Schiaparelli and modeled its clothing, becoming known for her cropped gamine hairstyle and eclectic style. She also modeled for Christian Dior and was photographed by leading fashion photographers, including Cecil Beaton. She was photographed by Horst P. Horst for the April 15, 1950 cover of American Vogue.

Maxime went on to design children's clothes for the Schiaparelli boutique, BeBe, and ran the Paquin boutique. She later recalled: "Balenciaga taught me to sew. I was trying to make something. I decided to ask for directions right at the top, so I took my work over to him. We sat on his terrace and he taught me to stitch. Somebody else showed me how to drape, but I've never needed it, so I guess I've forgotten."

As a freelance fashion designer in the 1950s, she worked with Emilio Pucci in Italy. She designed knitwear for the London manufacturer Dorville. Her designs included a "boutique" wedding dress consisting of a white silk tuck-in sweater with trimming along the sleeves and a bateau neckline paired with a separate white brocade skirt by Sekers. Another design was a long-torso ensemble comprising a black open-knit wool sweater and a black faille skirt, accented with small ribbon bowknots.

Maxime eventually opened her own Paris couture house. In February 1955, she held an informal showing at the Hôtel Plaza Athénée in Paris, presenting town and boutique clothing that she had designed and made herself, along with jewellery of her own design. Her designs were included in the fourth collection of international couture models assembled for the Celanese Corporation of America. The collection was presented at benefit shows in April and May 1955, including events organized by the Junior League of Santa Barbara, the Art Institute of Kansas City, St. James Church in New York, the Travelers Aid Society's 50th-anniversary celebration in New York, the Girls' Club in Boston, and the Maternity Center in Chicago.

After two years, Maxim's fashion house closed. In 1957, she was commissioned to design low-priced "dime store" clothing for Prisunic, a French retail chain. In 1959, Gabrielle Aghion hired her to design for Chloé.

=== New York: Designing and food writing ===
In 1961, Maxime entered the American ready-to-wear market, designing a collection for Bloomingdale's.

In 1967, she married John McKendry, curator of prints and photographs at the Metropolitan Museum of Art. Their marriage placed her at the intersection of the city's established cultural institutions and its emerging artistic and creative communities.

In 1970, she began writing a food column for Vogue under her married name Maxime McKendry. Her writing combined recipes with observations about food and entertaining and drew on the English and Irish cooking of her childhood. Her first cookbook, Seven Centuries of English Cooking: A Collection of Recipes, was published in 1973. The book traced English recipes from the medieval period through the 20th century.

Maxime continued to work in fashion, designing clothing for several companies. Her designs included separates for Blousecraft, knitwear for Harmon Knitwear, and a collection of "kitchen clothes" for Swirl, which earned her the American Printed Fabrics Council's Tommy Award. Most of her business was with specialty shops, although her clothing was also sold at Bloomingdale's and Henri Bendel's Cachet.

In the early 1970s, Maxime became part of Andy Warhol's social circle in New York. She was referred to as the "Den mother" to the "Factory kids." Warhol considered de la Falaise for a role as a chef in one of his proposed television projects. Although the project was never produced, she appeared in Warhol's Phoney, a video-taped soap opera, featuring Candy Darling and Brigid Berlin in 1973. Maxime's scene with art historian John Richardson was filmed in her apartment. She subsequently cast by Warhol associate Paul Morrissey in Blood for Dracula (1974), in which she played La Marchesa di Fiore. During filming in Italy, she cooked Italian dishes that she had learned from fashion designer Valentino.

Maxime was also a contributing editor for Warhol's Interview magazine. She interviewed photographer Horst P. Horst for the November 1975 issue, and singer Patti Smith for the February 1976 issue. Maxime and her husband had previously sponsored her poetry readings in the British Colonial drawing room of their apartment.

In 1977, Warhol asked Maxime to devise a menu for the proposed "Andy-Mat," his planned version of an automat. Her suggestions included onion tarts, shepherds' pie, fish cakes, Irish lamb stew, key lime pie and a "nursery cocktail" of milk on the rocks, reflecting her expertise for English and Irish cuisines.

In 1980, Doubleday published Food in Vogue, a collection of recipes compiled by Maxime from her food column Vogue and a series of interviews with celebrities in their own kitchens. The book featured her own illustrations and recipes from a range of culinary traditions.

After her husband died, her daughter Loulou secured her a job designing scarves, shoes and bedding for Yves Saint Laurent licensees in the United States.

Maxime ventured into interior design. Her "Africanated" furniture, decorated with deep-colored geometric patterns, was exhibited at New York's Judith Goldfarb Gallery in 1991. Her pieces were purchased by clients including socialite Nan Kempner and model Iman.

=== Return to France ===
In the 1990s, Maxime moved to Saint-Rémy-de-Provence in southern France where she continued to collect and arrange furniture, textiles, art, and worked on memoirs that were not published during her lifetime.

She wrote the foreword to My Kingdom of Books (1999) by Richard Booth.

== Death ==
Maxime died of natural causes, aged 86, at her home in Saint-Rémy-de-Provence on 30 April 2009. She was survived by her daughter Loulou, her grandchildren, and great-grandchildren.

== Personal life ==
=== Marriages and children ===
Her first marriage was to Count Alain de La Falaise, whom she married in 1946. They divorced in 1950, following a series of her infidelities, including an affair with British ambassador Duff Cooper. They had two children:

- Louise Vava Lucia Henriette ("Loulou") Le Bailly de La Falaise (1947–2011), who also became a fashion model and later a muse to Yves Saint Laurent and a jewellery designer. Her first husband was Desmond FitzGerald, 29th Knight of Glin. Her second husband, writer Thadée Klossowski de Rola, was the son of the painter Balthus. They had a daughter, Anna Klossowski de Rola.
- Alexis Richard Dion Oswald Le Bailly de La Falaise, (1948–2004) was a furniture designer who also appeared in Warhol's 1967 film Tub Girls. He had two children: Daniel de La Falaise, a chef, food writer, and photographer married to Molly Malone; and Lucie de La Falaise, a model married to Marlon Richards, son of Keith Richards and Anita Pallenberg.

In 1967, Maxime married John McKendry, who was 10 years her junior. McKendry was a curator of prints and photographs at the Metropolitan Museum of Art. They had been introduced by her daughter Loulou. In 1975, Maxime said, "He was my ideal. Irish in looks. So brilliant. Although we have a very independent marriage, we have a fantastic relationship." McKendry died of cirrhosis of the liver later that year.

Maxime also had affairs with John Paul Getty III, artist Max Ernst, and filmmaker Louis Malle.

=== Residences ===
Maxime and McKendry lived on Jane Street in the West Village but due to noise complaints they lost their lease. Their next apartment at 190 Riverside Drive on the Upper West Side was described as having a "whimsical bohemian" aesthetic and was opulently decorated with an abundance of patterns, "Geoffrey Bennison-type fabrics and fanciful flea market objects."

They regularly hosted dinner parties, where de la Falaise tested out her exotic recipes. Because Maxime often practiced what she called "help-less entertaining," they removed the wall between the kitchen and an adjoining room to create a combined cooking and dining area. Guests sat on a long banquette along the wall, opposite a row of chairs arranged around a marble tabletop. Their guests included Warhol, fashion editor Diana Vreeland, musician Mick Jagger, curator Henry Geldzahler, art historian John Richardson, writer Truman Capote, model Penelope Tree, jewelry designer Kenneth Jay Lane, socialites Drue Heinz, Nan Kempner, D.D. Ryan, and Mica Ertegun, as well as members of several prominent British families.

In the 1980s, Maxime lived in an apartment on Fifth Avenue in New York, which she decorated with an eclectic mixture of Indian and African textiles and European antiques. Her home was featured in the September 1988 issue of House & Garden, which described the interiors as "if several fanciful antiques shops have been turned upside down and shaken hard."

She later had a home in Béarn, before settling in Saint-Rémy-de-Provence in southern France. Her Saint-Rémy home, a Provençal farmhouse shared with her friend Sarah St George, was featured in House & Garden in 2001. De la Falaise decorated the house with brightly colored furniture, textiles, mosaics, European antiques, and African-inspired patterns. She also painted furniture and architectural features and designed a carpet for the house.

== Legacy ==
Maxime became known for her bohemian style, incorporating finds from the Paris flea markets into her wardrobe and designs, and helping to popularize flea-market clothing as a source of high fashion. She was described as having a "well-tamed gypsy look."

English photographer Cecil Beaton reportedly regarded de la Falaise as "the only truly chic Englishwoman of her generation." In 2004, The Independent of London described her as "one of the greatest living style icons."

Her influence continued to be noted by fashion publications after her death. In 2025, British Vogue described de la Falaise as a fixture of the magazine's history and highlighted a 1950 photograph of her by Beaton wearing a mermaid dress by Paquin.
