= Catherine FitzGerald =

Irish landscape designer (born 1971)

Catherine Fitzgerald
- Born: Catherine Celinda Leopoldine FitzGerald; 18 May 1971 (age 55)
- Noble family: FitzGerald
- Spouses: Edward Lambton, Viscount Lambton (m. 1995; div. 2002) Dominic West (m. 2010)
- Issue: Dora; Senan; Francis; Christabel
- Father: Desmond FitzGerald, 29th Knight of Glin
- Mother: Olda Ann Willes
- Occupation: Landscape designer

Catherine Celinda Leopoldine FitzGerald, formerly styled Viscountess Lambton, (born 18 May 1971) is an Irish landscape designer and gardener. She and her husband, Dominic West, operate her ancestral home, Glin Castle, as a small hotel and event venue.

== Early life and family ==
Catherine FitzGerald was born on 18 May 1971. She is a member of the FitzGerald dynasty, an Anglo-Norman aristocratic dynasty that originated in the Welsh Marches, England and Normandy. Her father, Desmond FitzGerald, 29th Knight of Glin, was the last Knight of Glin, as the title could only descend in the male line. She has two sisters, Honor and Nesta. Her godfather was Christopher Gibbs.

FitzGerald grew up at her family's ancestral home, Glin Castle, in Glin, County Limerick. She attended St Mary's Calne and Trinity College Dublin.

== Career ==
FitzGerald works as a landscape designer and gardener in Ireland and the United Kingdom; she shares a studio with landscape architect Mark Lutyens in London. She has worked as a freelance writer on landscaping and gardening for House & Garden, The Garden, Interiors Magazine, and The Telegraph.

FitzGerald has worked on the gardens at her family's home, Glin Castle, and has also worked on landscaping projects at Hillsborough Castle, Lansdowne Crescent, Clarendon Park, Holland Park Avenue, Glenarm Castle, and St Olav's Church.

== Personal life ==
FitzGerald married Edward Lambton, Viscount Lambton, the future 7th Earl of Durham, on 19 October 1995. They divorced in 2002. She married Dominic West, whom she had dated while at Trinity College, on 26 June 2010 in a Catholic ceremony at the Church of the Immaculate Conception in Limerick. She and West have four children: Dora, Senan (who made his screen debut alongside his father in The Crown), Francis, and Christabel.

FitzGerald and West own a town house in Shepherd's Bush, London, a home in the Cotswolds, and share ownership of Glin Castle with her sister.

=== Glin Castle ===
In 2011, FitzGerald’s father died. As her father had no male heirs, the hereditary knighthood of Glin became extinct. FitzGerald, along with her mother and sisters, decided to sell the estate through an auction at Christie’s. The castle, which had operated in the hospitality trade, did not sell, so FitzGerald and West, along with FitzGerald's sisters, bought it to keep it in the family. They split their time between Glin Castle and their home in London.

FitzGerald and West first operated the castle as a bed and breakfast and now run it as a hotel and event venue.
