= Head on a Green Sofa =

Painting by Lucian Freud

- Artist: Lucian Freud
- Year: 1960-1961
- Medium: Oil on canvas
- Dimensions: 91.5 cm × 91.5 cm (36.0 in × 36.0 in)
- Location: Private collection

Head on a Green Sofa is an oil painting by Lucian Freud executed in 1960-1961. It is held in a private collection.

It is a portrait of Lady Lambton, wife of Antony Lambton, Viscount Lambton, 6th Earl of Durham. She is shown reclined in a couch, apparently sleeping or resting. It was sold at Sotheby's, London, 12 February 2014 by its then owner Edward Lambton, 7th Earl of Durham, for £2,994,500.

== Bibliography ==
- Lawrence Gowing. Lucian Freud, London 1982, p. 121, no. 95, illustrated.
- Exhibition Catalogue, Rome, Palazzo Ruspoli, Lucian Freud: Dipinti e opera su carta 1940-1991, 1991, p. 22, illustrated.
- Robert Hughes, Lucian Freud Paintings, London 1993, p. 22, illustrated in colour.
- Bruce Bernard and Derek Birdsall, Eds. Lucian Freud, London 1996, no. 96, illustrated in colour.
