= Glin Castle =

Georgian country house in County Limerick, Ireland

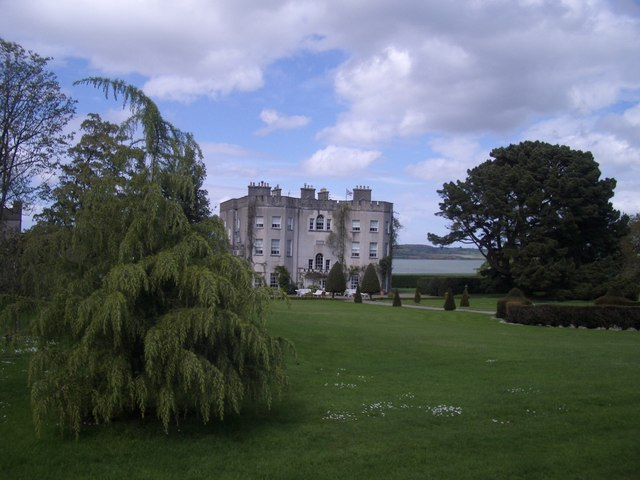

- Location within Ireland
- 52.5698°N 9.2945°W
- Location: Glin, County Limerick, Ireland

History
- Built: c. 1780

Site notes
- Architectural styles: Georgian; Neoclassical
- Owner: FitzGerald family

Glin Castle is a Georgian country house and protected structure located along the River Shannon in Glin, County Limerick, Ireland. It was built in the late 18th century to replace an earlier tower house of the same name. The estate has belonged to the FitzGerald family for over 700 years and was the seat of the Knights of Glin. It remains a home of a branch of the FitzGerald family, also available to let.

== History ==
The FitzGerald dynasty first settled in the area in the 13th century, following the Anglo-Norman invasion of Ireland, at the nearby Shanid Castle.

=== Castle ===
In the 14th century, the Lord of Desmond elevated an illegitimate son to the hereditary knighthood of Glin. He built Glin Castle within the village of Glin, which became the permanent seat of the Knight of Glin. The castle was attacked during the Desmond Rebellions in the 16th century, the Cromwellian conquest of Ireland in the 17th century, the Jacobite risings and the Enforcement of the Penal Laws. In 1601, the castle was besieged by an English army and the Knight's son was kidnapped.

=== Georgian house ===
By the late 17th century, the original castle had been abandoned and the FitzGerald family moved into an adjacent thatched longhouse. John Bateman FitzGerald, 23rd Knight of Glin married Margaretta Maria Fraunceis Gwyn in the 1780s and used her dowry to build a new home in the Georgian style. Later neo-classical elements were added to the building.

Other structures on the estate, including a gate lodge, agricultural outbuildings, gate house, and follies. were added in the late 18th and early 19th centuries.

In 1923, during the Irish Civil War, a group of Sinn Féin members attacked the castle.

In 1993, the FitzGeralds decided to turn the castle into a hotel to help pay for the upkeep. The hotel closed in 2008. In 2011, Desmond FitzGerald, 29th Knight of Glin died without a male heir. In 2015, the castle was put up for auction at Christie's by Lady FitzGerald; it did not sell. To keep the castle in the family, it was purchased by Catherine FitzGerald, daughter of the last Knight of Glin, and her husband Dominic West, and it is now both a family home and a complete-let venue.

== Gallery ==
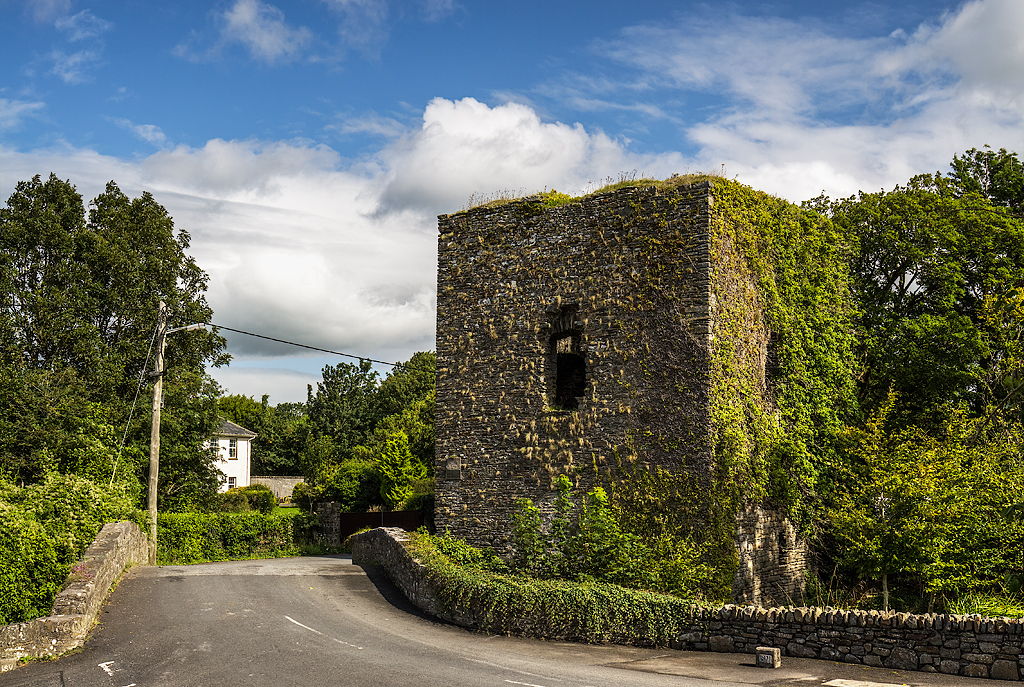
Original castle at Glin (tower house) built within the village in the 14th or 15th century

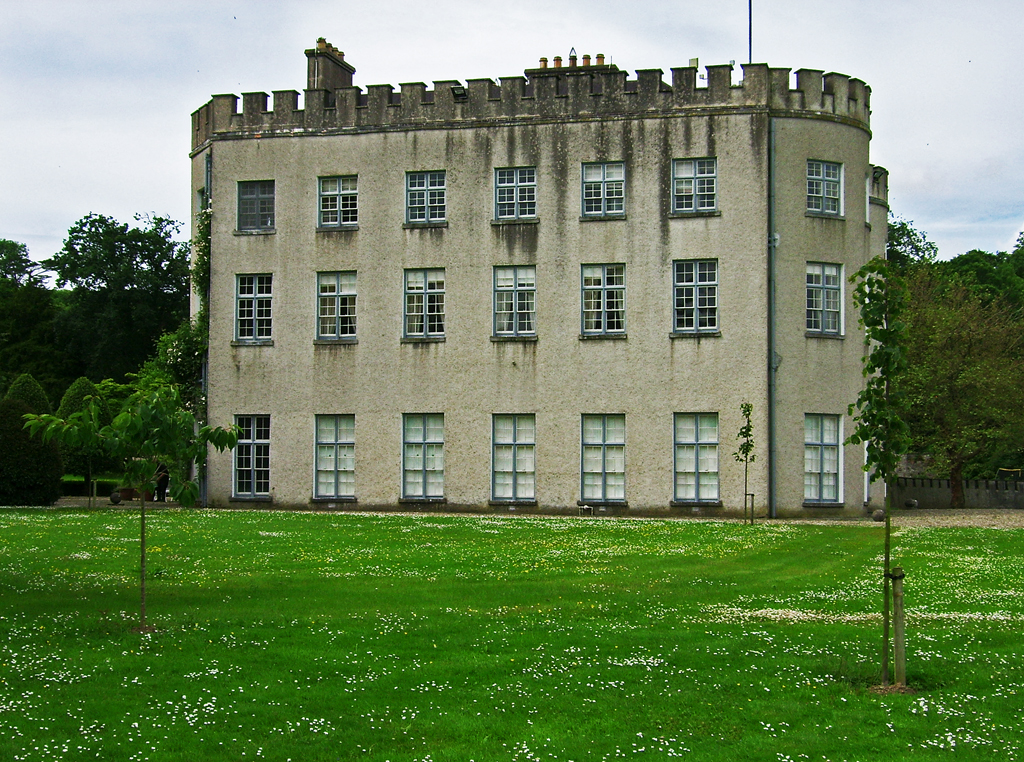
Later mansion at Glin (country house) built outside the village in the late 18th century
