= Lady Lucinda Lambton =

English writer, photographer and broadcaster on architectural topics

- Born: 10 May 1943 (age 83); Newcastle upon Tyne, England
- Spouses: Henry Harrod (m. 1965; div. 1973) Sir Edmund Cameron-Ramsay-Fairfax-Lucy, 6th Baronet (m. 1986; div. 1989) Sir Peregrine Worsthorne (m. 1991; died 2020)
- Children: 2
- Parent(s): Antony Lambton; Belinda Blew-Jones
- Relatives: Lady Anne Lambton (sister); Edward Lambton, 7th Earl of Durham (brother)
- Writing career
- Notable works: Sublime Suburbia; The Other House of Windsor; The Great North Road; Bringing the House Down

Lady Lucinda Lambton (born 10 May 1943), also known as Lady Lucinda Worsthorne, is an English writer, photographer, and broadcaster on architectural subjects.

== Early life ==
Lucinda Lambton was born in Newcastle upon Tyne, the eldest child of the Conservative defence minister Lord Lambton. The family lived in County Durham and London, where her sister Anne Lambton, later to become an actress, was born in 1954.

Lambton spent six years at Queen's Gate School, London, then went to a finishing school in Florence, but she ended her education without gaining any qualifications and became a professional photographer working for various newspapers, including the Evening Standard. Her first assignment was working for the historian Frank Atkinson, who was collecting artefacts to form the basis of Beamish Museum in County Durham.

== Career ==
Lambton has researched, written and presented 55 films for the BBC and 25 films for ITV. They include On The Throne – The History of the Lavatory, The Great North Road, A Cabinet of Curiosities and The Other House of Windsor. Sublime Suburbia, her series of four films for ITV about the architectural and historic delights of London's suburbs, won the Regional Television award for the best documentary series of 2003. A further series of Sublime Suburbia in six parts, followed in 2004.

She has written and taken the photographs for 14 books including: Temples of Convenience, a history of the lavatory; Beastly Buildings, about architecture for animals; Vanishing Victoriana; An Album of Curious Houses and Lucinda Lambton's A-Z of Britain, a companion to the 26-part television series for the BBC.

Lambton has made presentations throughout the British Isles, and in America. She has been sponsored by the National Art Collections Fund at the Royal Geographical Society, and provided several of the annual talks for the National Trust at The Royal Festival Hall. She has also travelled on board the QE2 to speak for the National Trust and the Royal Oak Foundation and she has spoken at the Los Angeles County Museum of Art. She sometimes opens new buildings and museums, and hosts architectural and canine prize giving events.

She has made several series for BBC Radio 4, including Bringing the House Down, Elevations and Revelations, Pride of Place, an argument against modern architecture, Hidden Treasures and Listed, illuminating efforts of the Twentieth Century Society to save notable post-World War II buildings. She has been a castaway on Desert Island Discs.

Lambton is a regular contributor to newspapers and magazines, including The Oldie, The Daily Telegraph, The Times, Country Life, and the Daily Mail.

== Honours and affiliations ==
She is an Honorary Fellow of the Royal Institute of British Architects and an honorary member of the Chelsea Arts Club, as well as President of the Avoncroft Museum of Historic Buildings. She is a patron of the Cinema Theatre Association. She is an Honorary Vice President of The Crossness Engines Trust. She is president of the Garden History Society.

== Personal life ==
When Lambton's father's died in 2006, he left his entire estate to his youngest child, Edward Lambton, 7th Earl of Durham. Lambton, her sisters Lady Anne Lambton and Lady Beatrix Neville subsequently sought a share of their father's estate. The sisters contested to have the dispute heard in Italy, arguing that Italian succession law entitled the children to equal shares of a family estate. In May 2013, their brother initiated proceedings in the High Court seeking to have the matter heard in England rather than Italy. The estate, valued at more than £12 million, included property and other assets in England and Italy, including the family's Tuscan property, Villa Cetinale. The dispute was settled out of court in January 2014, with the three sisters reportedly receiving a combined £5 million.

=== Marriages ===
On 16 January 1965, Lambton married Henry Mark Harrod, eldest son of Sir Roy Harrod. They were divorced in 1973. In January 1986, she married Sir Edmund Cameron-Ramsay-Fairfax-Lucy, 6th Baronet, and divorced him in 1989.

In May 1991, Lambton married journalist Sir Peregrine Worsthorne, who was 19 years her senior. A portrait of the couple taken by Denis Waugh in 1993 is in the collection of the National Portrait Gallery, London. They lived in Hedgerley, Buckinghamshire. Worsthorne died at the age of 96 in October 2020.
