= Blood for Dracula =

1974 film by Paul Morrissey

- West German theatrical release poster
- Directed by: Paul Morrissey
- Screenplay by: Paul Morrissey
- Story by: Paul Morrissey
- Based on: Characters and concepts created by Bram Stoker for Dracula
- Produced by: Andrew Braunsberg; Carlo Ponti
- Starring: Joe Dallesandro; Udo Kier; Maxime McKendry; Vittorio De Sica
- Cinematography: Luigi Kuveiller
- Edited by: Jed Johnson; Franca Silvi (Italian version)
- Music by: Claudio Gizzi
- Production company: Compagnia Cinematografica Champion
- Distributed by: Euro International Films (Italy); Compagnie Française de Distribution Cinématographique (France)
- Release dates: 1 March 1974 (West Germany); 6 November 1974 (United States); 14 August 1975 (Italy)
- Running time: 106 minutes
- Country: Italy}}
- Language: English
- Budget: $400,000

Blood for Dracula, also known as Andy Warhol's Dracula, is a 1974 horror film written and directed by Paul Morrissey. Presented by Andy Warhol, it stars Udo Kier, Joe Dallesandro, Arno Juerging, Maxime McKendry, and Vittorio De Sica. The film follows Count Dracula as he travels to Italy in search of virgins whose blood he needs to survive.

The film is the second collaboration between Warhol, Morrissey, and Italian producer Carlo Ponti. It was filmed immediately after its predecessor Flesh for Frankenstein (1973) in Italy. Italian director Antonio Margheriti is credited in the Italian prints of the film. This misattribution led to Ponti and Margheriti being prosecuted for "continued and aggravated fraud against the state" over attempts to obtain benefits reserved by law for Italian films.

== Plot ==
Set in the early 1920s, a sickly and dying Count Dracula, who must drink the blood of virgins to survive, travels from his homeland of Romania to pre-Fascist Italy on the advice of his manservant Anton. Believing he will have better luck finding virgins in a Catholic country, Dracula befriends Il Marchese di Fiore, an impecunious Italian landowner whose declining estate leaves him eager to marry one of his four daughters to the wealthy aristocrat.

Two of the daughters, Saphiria and Rubinia, regularly have sex with Mario Balato, the estate's handyman, a proud peasant and staunch Marxist, who believes a socialist revolution is imminent. The other two, Esmeralda and Perla, are virgins, although Esmeralda is considered too plain and old for marriage, while Perla is only 14. Dracula is assured that all four daughters are virgins and drinks the blood of Saphiria and Rubinia. Their "tainted" blood reveals the deception and further weakens him, although he hypnotizes both women and makes them his slaves.

When the Marchese leaves Italy to settle his debts, Mario discovers that Dracula is a vampire and learns what he has done to the sisters. Fearing for Perla's safety, Mario uses the pretext of protecting her to rape her, then warns La Marchesa di Fiore about Dracula's intentions. Meanwhile, Dracula drinks Esmeralda's blood, turning her into a vampire and restoring his strength. La Marchesa confronts Anton, who stabs her; she fatally shoots him before succumbing to her wound. Mario kills Dracula and Esmeralda, becoming the de facto master of the estate.

== Cast ==
- Udo Kier as Count Dracula
- Joe Dallesandro as Mario Balato the handyman
- Arno Juerging as Anton, the Count's manservant
- Vittorio De Sica as Il Marchese di Fiore
- Maxime McKendry as La Marchesa di Fiore
- Milena Vukotic as Esmeralda di Fiore
- Dominique Darel as Saphiria di Fiore
- Stefania Casini as Rubinia di Fiore
- Silvia Dionisio as Perla di Fiore
- Roman Polański (uncredited) as man in tavern

== Production ==
=== Pre-production ===
In 1973, Pop artist Andy Warhol and his director Paul Morrissey signed a contract with Italian producer Carlo Ponti for two films. English producer Andrew Braunsberg had arranged the financing by securing $700,000 from Ponti, Cinerama in Germany, and Jean-Pierre Rassam in France. Ponti initially agreed to finance Flesh for Frankenstein on a budget of $300,000, with Morrissey and Warhol receiving fees and a share of the profits, while Ponti retained distribution rights. Ponti suggested they make a second film with the remaining funds, and Braunsberg proposed a Dracula film, resulting in Blood for Dracula.

In 1973, Morrissey told The New York Times: "We don't want our pictures taken seriously even if they are played straight. … These are not horror spoofs like Polanski's 'Vampire Killers,' although Polanski is acting in 'Dracula,' and so is Vittorio De Sica. We're injecting our style into formula film."

The Warhol entourage involved in the production included actor Joe Dallesandro, who was to star in both films; Warhol's boyfriend Jed Johnson, who had spent several months handling pre-production work; and Warhol's business manager Fred Hughes, who served as art director on both films. They stayed at Polanski's Villa Mandorli on the Via Appia Antica in Rome. "It was an up experience," said Johnson, "but it was really different working with an Italian crew and mostly European actors, and I think it was hard for Paul doing two films back to back."

=== Production ===
One day after filming on Flesh for Frankenstein ended, Morrissey had Udo Kier, Dallesandro, and Arno Juerging cut their hair in preparation for Blood for Dracula, which began filming approximately a week later. Kier also lost 10 pounds for the role of Count Dracula. He later recalled that he ate only salad leaves and water for a week, leaving him so weak on the first day of filming that he required a wheelchair.

The principal location was the 18th-century Villa Parisi in the hills overlooking Rome. The cast included Italian actor Vittorio De Sica and Il Marchese di Fiore, who wrote his own lines on the set. English designer and writer Maxime McKendry, traveled from New York to portray his wife La Marchesa di Fiore and she cooked meals for the cast. In May 1973, she told Women's Wear Daily, "They called me the other day and asked if I wanted to act for them. I didn't ask what it was about. I have only seen the costumes, and I just love them. The picture is supposed to be placed in the early 20s, and I bet the dresses will have a great fashion influence." Polanski made a cameo appearance in a tavern scene.

=== Post-production ===
Bryanston Pictures picked up the American and Canadian distributing rights to both Flesh for Frankenstein and Blood for Dracula.

The Italian credits of the film give it different ones, including stating that Tonino Guerra wrote the screenplay and story, and Franca Silvi edited the film as opposed to Jed Johnson. Antonio Margheriti is credited as the director in the Italian prints, which he later claimed was not true, but that he did direct scenes with Silvia Dionisio and Vittorio De Sica. Kier has stated that both he and the other cast members only received direction from Morrissey and that he himself never saw Margheriti on the set. Margheriti's credit was due to Carlo Ponti having an Italian credited in order to obtain benefits by law for Italian films. Ponti and Margheriti were both put on trial later for "continued and aggravated fraud against the state."

== Release ==
Blood for Dracula was first released as Andy Warhol's Dracula in both West Germany on 1 March 1974

In the United States, Blood for Dracula received an X rating from the MPAA. It was screened at the Atlanta International Film Festival on 16 August 1974. The theatrical release in the United States followed on 6 November 1974.

A 98-minute version was released theatrically by Euro International Films in Italy on 14 August 1975 under the title Dracula cerca sangue di vergine e...morì di sete!!! (lit. 'Dracula is searching for virgins' blood, and...he died of thirst!!!').

In the United Kingdom, the film passed with cuts to 103 minutes, avoiding being labeled as a video nasty; however, it was included on a tertiary list of titles that could potentially be subject to seizure by police in England. It was therefore not submitted for video certification by the BBFC until 1995, which was granted with about four minutes cut. Its uncut version was not released in the UK until 2006.

Louis Periano, who distributed the film in the United States, later tried to cash in on the success of Mel Brooks' film Young Frankenstein and re-released the film as a 94-minute R rated version titled Young Dracula in 1976 (as opposed to the original 106-minute X rated version).

== Reception ==
=== Box office ===
Dracula grossed $26,000 in its first week at the Arcadia Theatre in Philadelphia. In Los Angeles, it grossed $62,400 during its first week across 12 locations. The film also earned $6,500 at the Village Theatre in Cherry Hill, New Jersey, and $15,000 at the Circle Theatre in Brookline, Massachusetts.

=== Critical reception ===
Blood for Dracula received generally positive reviews, with critics praising its camp humor. Joe Baltake of the Philadelphia Daily News called it a "riotous spoof of the horror-movie genre full of the kind of impudent, self-effacing sass which its predecessor, Warhol's 'Frankenstein,' only partially realized." He concluded that the film is "horror-camp at its ultimate." Similar, Norma McClain Stoop of After Dark wrote, "I rocked with laughter at Andy Warhol's Dracula, a super-camp, super-gore, super-sexy delight." Kevin Thomas of the Los Angeles Times was less enthusiastic, describing the film as "aesthetically pleasing" and "pretty funny up until that Grand Guignol finale," but felt that Morrissey had too much talent for "such sickening junk."

Farnum Gray of The Atlanta Constitution interpreted the film through its Marxist themes, writing that "the proletariat must triumph over the blood-sucking privileged classes. In a symbolic enactment of the fall of capitalism, the conflict between gardener and count builds to a wild climax, at once hilarious and shocking, that makes audiences howl." Bill Wine of The Drummer found Blood for Dracula "significantly more restrained" than its predecessor, writing that "Morrissey has concentrated more on yok than shock, and the result is an ample helping of hearty laughs and only one scene of explicit violence." New York magazine, however, argued that "ultimately the offensive gory interludes outlast the funny moments and oddball horror."

== See also ==
- Andy Warhol filmography
- Vampire film
