= Desmond FitzGerald, 28th Knight of Glin =

Irish nobleman and socialite

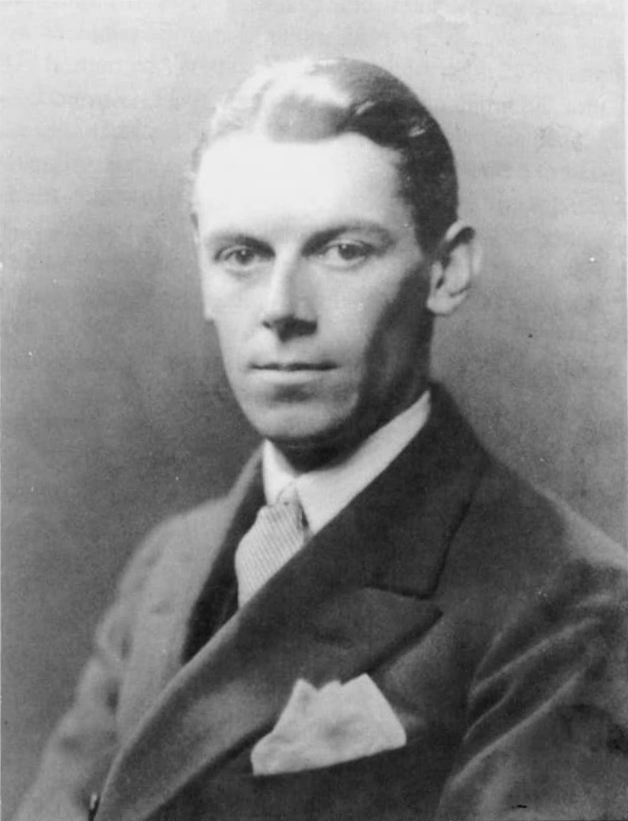
Desmond FitzGerald, 28th Knight of Glin

Desmond Wyndham Otho FitzGerald, 28th Knight of Glin (20 January 1901 – 2 April 1949) was an Anglo-Irish hereditary knight and socialite.

Born in Croom, County Limerick, FitzGerald was the only son of Desmond FitzJohn Lloyd FitzGerald, 27th Knight of Glin, and Lady Rachel Charlotte Wyndham-Quin, daughter of Windham Wyndham-Quin, 4th Earl of Dunraven and Mount-Earl. He was educated at Winchester College and Lancing College before moving to London in 1924.

In 1929 he married Veronica Villiers (1909-1998), a cousin of Winston Churchill and daughter of Ernest Villiers. They had three children together. His heir was Desmond FitzGerald, 29th Knight of Glin. He died from tuberculosis in 1949 in Limerick, Ireland.

Titles of nobility (Ireland)
| Preceded by Desmond FitzJohn Lloyd FitzGerald | Knight of Glin; 1938–1949 | Succeeded by Desmond FitzGerald |
