= Lady Anne Lambton =

British actress (born 1954)

- Born: Mary Gabrielle Ann Lambton; 4 July 1954 (age 72); London, England
- Occupation: Actress
- Years active: 1985–present
- Parent(s): Antony Lambton; Belinda Blew-Jones
- Relatives: Lady Lucinda Lambton (sister); Edward Lambton, 7th Earl of Durham (brother); Freda Dudley Ward (great-aunt)

Lady Mary Gabrielle Ann Lambton (born 4 July 1954), known as Anne Lambton, is a British actress. She is the daughter of Antony Lambton, formerly 6th Earl of Durham, and the younger sister of writer and broadcaster Lucinda Lambton.

Lambton worked as a secretary for Pop artist Andy Warhol at the Factory in New York City. She accompanied Warhol on his 1975 promotional tour for The Philosophy of Andy Warhol and served as his bodyguard. Lambton later pursued an acting career, appearing in several films, including Sid and Nancy (1986), Half Moon Street (1986), and The Witches (1990), as well as television series such as Midsomer Murders,The Borgias, and The Crown.

== Early life ==
Lady Anne Lambton was born on 4 July 1954, the fourth of six children of Antony Lambton, formerly 6th Earl of Durham, and his wife, Bindy (née Blew-Jones). In 1973, her father resigned from the government after photographs of him with prostitutes were published.

== Career ==
=== Andy Warhol and the Factory ===
In 1975, Lambton moved temporarily to New York City, where she worked as a secretary at the Factory, the studio of Pop artist Andy Warhol. That autumn, she accompanied Warhol on his promotional tour of the United States for his book The Philosophy of Andy Warhol. During the tour, she also served as Warhol's bodyguard. Warhol described her role by saying, "She keeps strange people away from me. She scares them with her British accent."

In Washington, D.C., Warhol and Lambton attended a reception at the home of Peter J. Malatesta, a former aide to Vice President Spiro Agnew, where Warhol was the guest of honor. At the party, the two were interviewed by Lloyd Dobyns for the NBC program Weekend. In November 1975, her parents hosted a party for Warhol at their Regents Park home. Warhol told the press that he had come to London "because of my girlfriend Anne Lambton." He added, "Oh yeah, I'm in love with her. She came in to help out at the office and be a bodyguard."

=== Acting career ===
Lambton later pursued an acting career. She made her film debut as Linda in Sid and Nancy (1986), followed by the role of Sidney Platts-Williams in Half Moon Street (1986). She played the sinister Woman in Black in The Witches (1990), based on the novel by Roald Dahl. Her subsequent film and television appearances included Brothers of the Head and Mrs. Henderson Presents (both 2005), Rosemary & Thyme (2006), and The Edge of Love (2008).

In recent years she has appeared in television series. Lambton had roles in Midsomer Murders in 2008 and The Borgias in 2011. She portrayed Gloria, a reporter, in the second season of the Netflix series The Crown in 2017. In 2026, she was a therapist in The Crow Girl.

== Personal life ==
When Lambton's father's died in 2006, he left his entire estate to his heir and youngest child, Edward Lambton, 7th Earl of Durham. Lambton and her sister broadcaster Lady Lucinda Lambton and Lady Beatrix Neville subsequently sought a share of their father's estate. The estate, valued at more than £12 million, included property and other assets in England and Italy, including the Tuscan property, Villa Cetinale. They contested to have the dispute heard in Italy, where they argued that succession law entitled the children to equal shares of a family estate. In May 2013, their brother initiated proceedings in the High Court in an attempt to have the dispute heard in England rather than Italy. In January 2014, the dispute was settled out of court, with the three sisters reportedly receiving a combined £5 million.
