= Knight of Glin =

Irish hereditary title

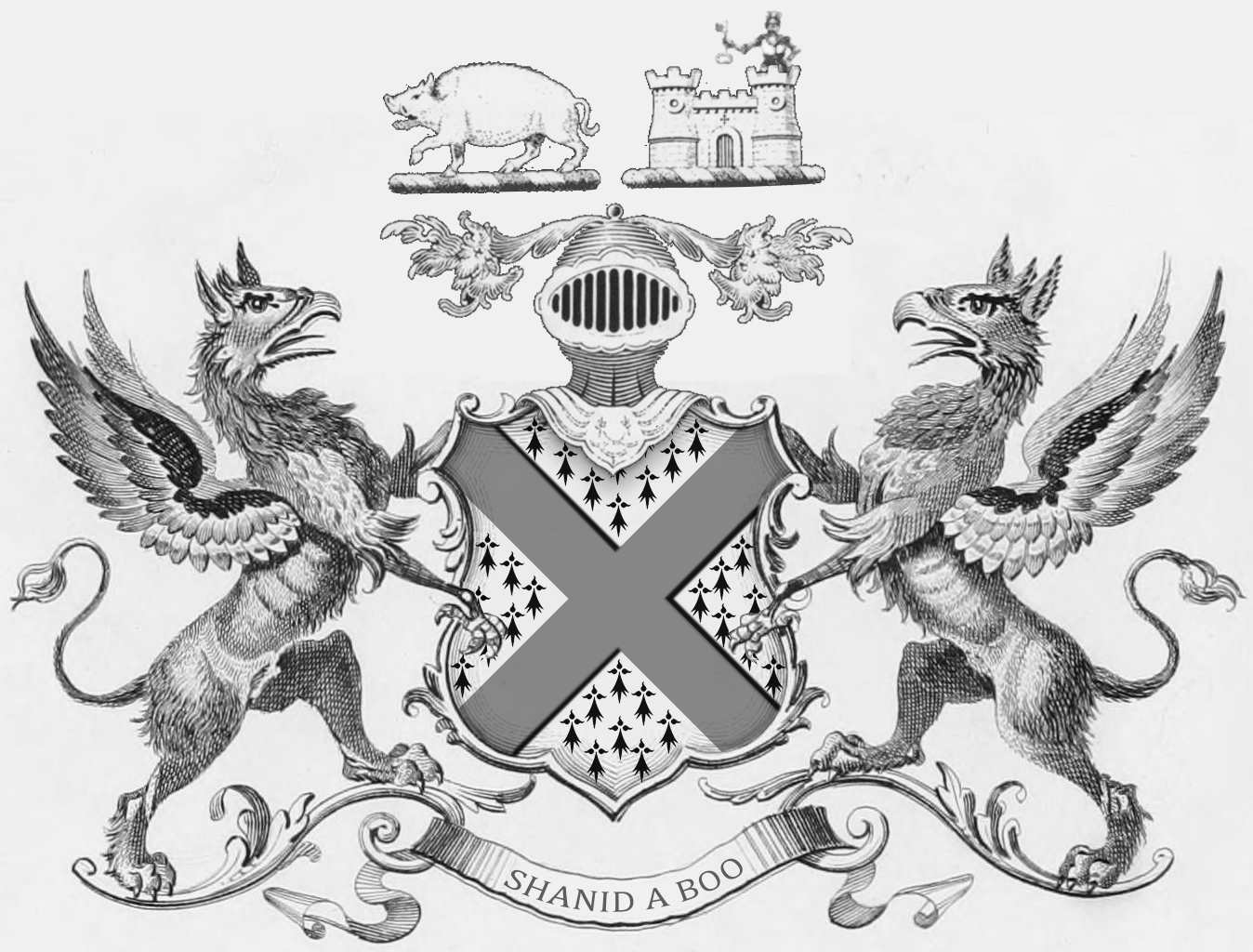
Coat of Arms of the Knight of Glin

The Knight of Glin (Irish: Ridire an Ghleanna; dormant 14 September 2011), also known as the Black Knight or Knight of the Valley, was an hereditary knighthood held by the FitzGerald and FitzMaurice families of County Limerick, Ireland, since the early 14th century. The family was a branch of the FitzMaurice/FitzGerald Dynasty commonly known as the Geraldines and related to the now extinct Earls of Desmond who were granted extensive lands in County Limerick by the Crown. The title was named after the village of Glin, near the Knight's lands. The Knight of Glin was properly addressed as "Knight" (not, as one might expect, "Sir ______ FitzGerald").

The family name "FitzGerald" comes from the (Norman) French "Fils de Gerald," i.e. "Son of Gerald."

The coat-of-arms of the Glin family is: Ermine: a saltire gules. Crest: a boar passant gules, bristled and armed. Motto: Sahnit a Boo. The arms of the various families in Ireland are similar. The Knights of Glin bear as supporters two griffins collared and chained, and have a second crest: a castle with two towers, issuant from the sinister tower a knight in armor holding in the dexter hand a key proper. The Glin family seat is at Glin, Glin Castle, County Limerick, Ireland.

Like the Knights of Kerry, the Knights of Glin descended from one of the younger or illegitimate sons of The 1st Baron Desmond and Honora. There is confusion as to Honora's parentage, as one source claims her to be the daughter of Phelim MacHugh O'Connor Don, of the family of the Kings of Connacht. Alternatively, she is stated to be the daughter of Hugh O'Connor Kerry, a wholly different family. Lord Desmond was also known as Sir John Fitz-John or Seán Mór na Sursainge, and he lived c. 1260. The last knight, Desmond FitzGerald, 29th Knight of Glin, died on 14 September 2011.

== History ==
This Desmond family are descended from Maurice FitzGerald, Lord of Llanstephan, a companion-in-arms of Strongbow Richard de Clare, 2nd Earl of Pembroke, the Norman conqueror of Ireland. He went to Ireland in 1168, being sent with ten knights, twenty esquires, and one hundred archers, to assist Dermot MacMurrough, king of Leinster. He died 1 September 1177, buried in the friary of the Grey Friars of Wexford. Maurice was the second son of Gerald de Windsor, Constable of Pembroke, Wales and his wife given to him by Plantagenet Norman English King Henry II, the South Welsh Princess Nesta or Nest ferch Rhys thus descended from Howell the Good, king of the Britons who codified Welsh Law. Maurice FitzGerald's children were: Fitzmaurice Fitzgerald, justice of Ireland, who built the castle of Sligo and is ancestor of the Dukes of Leinster. William, Baron of Naas, County Kildare, and ancestor of the Viscount Gormanston. Thomas FitzMaurice FitzGerald married Elinor, daughter of Jordan de Marisco, and sister to Herve de Monte Marisco, constable of Ireland, and of Geoffrey de Marisco, Lord Justice of Ireland in the reign of King John. He died 1207.

John FitzGerald, 1st Baron Desmond, of Shanid, County Limerick, Lord of Connelloe and Decies, married (first) Margery, daughter and heir of Sir Thomas Fitz-Anthony, Lord of Decies and Desmond. These domains were confirmed to him by Prince Edward, the Black Prince in 1260. He married (second) Honora, daughter of Hugh O'Connor, of Kerry. By his first wife he had a son: 1. Maurice Fitz-John FitzGerald, who was Lord of Decies and Desmond, and ancestor of the FitzGeralds, Earls of Desmond, who ranked among the most powerful nobles of Ireland for more than two centuries. By his second wife he had issue: 2. Gilbert Fitz-John, ancestor of the White Knight. 3. Sir John Fitz-John, mentioned below. 4. Maurice Fitz-John, ancestor of the Knights of Kerry. 5. Thomas Fitz-John, ancestor of the Fitzgerald of the Island of Kerry.

John Fitz-Thomas FitzGerald, by virtue of his royal seigniory as a Count Palatine, created three of his sons by the second marriage, knights; and their descendants have been so styled in acts of parliament, patents under the great seal, and all legal proceedings, up to the present (1910) time. He founded the monastery of Tralee, and was buried there in 1260.

(VII) Sir John Fitz-John, Knight, was the first Knight of Glin, and had from his father the castles of Glincarbery and Beagh, county Limerick, Ireland. Children: John Fitz-John, mentioned below. Gerald Fitz-John, ancestor of the family of Clenlish and Castle Ishen, County Cork, Baronets.

VIII) Sir John Fitz-John del Glin was succeeded by his son.

"The earliest tradition I could find about Glin went back to 1569, when the [15th] knight, Thomas FitzGerald, was barbarously executed in Limerick. His mother, who was present at the execution, seized his head when he was beheaded and drank his blood. She then collected the parts of his dismembered body and put them in a linen sheet. When she set out for home with her precious burden she was followed by an immense concourse, including one hundred keening women.

Somewhere east of Foynes some soldiers tried to seize the corpse and in the fight that followed many people were slain. The body was interred in Lislaughtin Abbey in the tomb of his relative, the O'Connor Kerry."

According to another legend, in the early 16th century under Elizabeth I, England set about enforcing loyalty in the western parts of Ireland. When one of her ships came up to the Knight of Glin's castle on the Shannon Estuary, a fierce battle ensued. The ship's captain managed to capture one of the Knight's sons and sent the Knight a message that he should surrender or else the son would be put in one of the ship's cannons and fired against the castle wall. He replied that as he was virile and his wife was strong, it would be easy to produce another son.

The tradition about the siege of Glin castle differs in many respects from the facts as given by Carew in Pacata Hibernia. We do know that tradition can be a completely distorting mirror, but the popular memory of a local event such as a battle, siege or massacre would be more vivid and more lasting and in essence more trustworthy than Carew's narrative, who was prejudiced and gives a complete travesty of the facts.

The garrison of the castle, according to tradition, was divided into two sections, one of which was commanded by Donall na Searrach Culhane and the other by Tadhg Dore. Before the siege began, Carew, who had the knight's child as hostage, sent an order to the knight to surrender the castle at once or else he would blow the child out of the mouth of the cannon. The knight's answer was remembered but can only be rendered here by algebraic symbols: Gread leat. Ta X go meidhreach fos agus Y go briomhar. Is fuiriste leanbh eile do gheiniuint.

The assault on the castle then began under the command of Capt. Flower but was beaten back with slaughter by the defenders. Three brothers named Giltenan played a heroic part in repulsing the attack and slew some of the best of Flower's men. Carew called up fresh reinforcements, which he placed under the leadership of Turlough Roe MacMahon, who lived at Colmanstown castle, County Clare, almost opposite Glin. Turlough was a man of evil reputation who had already committed many dreadful crimes against his own kith and kin and against the Irish people at large. He was the father of the celebrated Maire Ruadh MacMahon. He is referred to in a poem of the time as

Traolach Ruadh an fhill agus an eithigh
do mhairbh a bhean agus a leanbh in eineacht.

("Turlough Roe, the turncoat and vulture,/Killed his wife and child together.")

The second assault also failed, but Turlough was determined to carry it through, for he hated with a hatred which evil men are known to feel towards those they have mortally injured. In the meantime the cannonading had played havoc with the defences of the castle. In the third attempt MacMahon was able to move in a large body of men who, after a gallant defence by the garrison, succeeded in capturing the castle. The Giltenans, Tadhg Dore and his brother, and Donall Culhane and two of his sons were slain in the final defence. Some of the garrison tried to escape by jumping into the water surrounding the castle, but only three men succeeded in getting away. These were Mahon Dillane, Lewy O'Connor and Donall Beag Culhane (whose father was slain in the last defence of the castle).

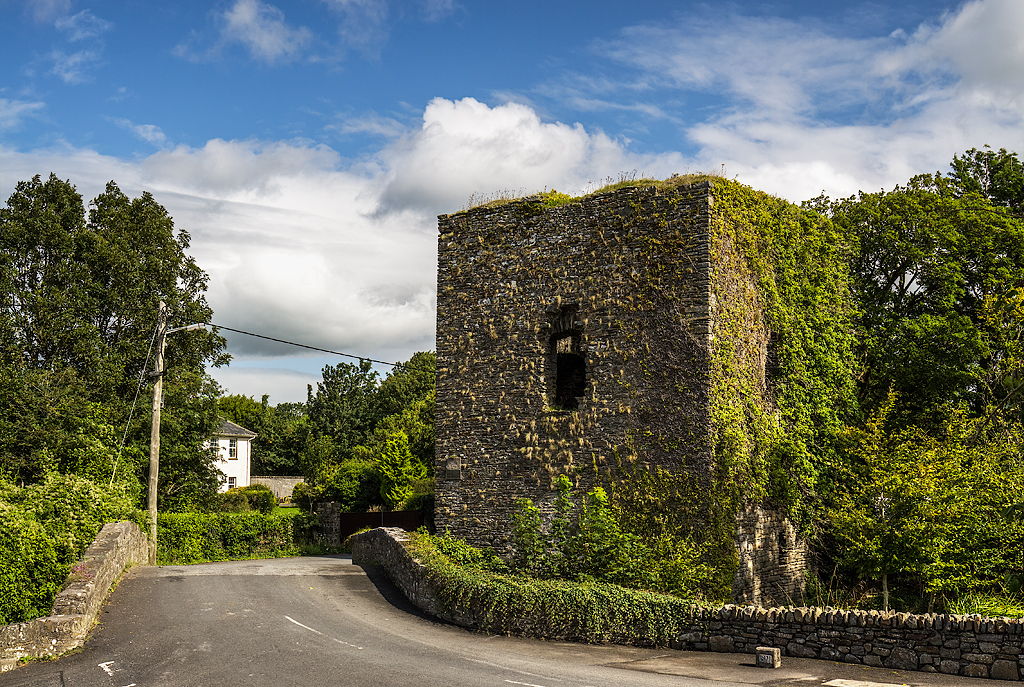
The "old castle" (tower house) at Glin is now in ruin

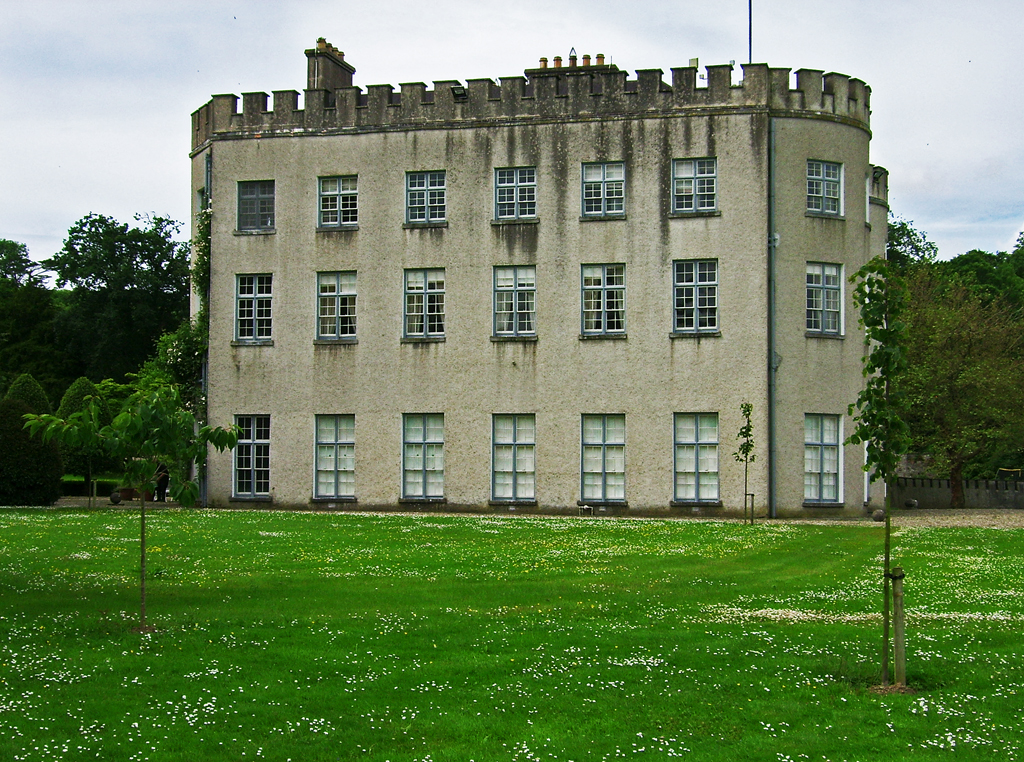
The "new castle" (country house) at Glin dates from the 18th century

The "old castle" of Glin, the scene of the above battle, is a ruin. The tower still stands with a historic plaque in place. After the destruction of the old castle, the Knights built the "new castle", a Georgian mansion, on the banks of the Shannon Estuary about a mile west of the old site. The last Knight lived there until his death (as well as in Dublin and London).

The 17th Knight, Gerald FitzGerald, was a Member for County Limerick in the Irish Patriot Parliament of 1689, called by James II during the Williamite war.

Under the Penal Laws of the 18th century, the Knights converted to the Church of Ireland to preserve their property. The surrounding villagers remained Roman Catholics, a division indicated today by the two churches in the village of Glin.

Following the war of independence and during the ensuing Civil War, in the early 1920s, Irish Republican Army (IRA) soldiers, from nearby North Kerry came to the 27th Knight Desmond FitzJohn Lloyd FitzGerald to tell him that no one whose title to land came from the English Crown could keep their land. The Knight immediately produced a document in Latin, supposedly from Duke of Normandy, indicating that his title did not originate from the English Crown at all. The baffled IRA men left the Knight with his properties, which he holds to this day. Another version of the incident relates how the then Knight, who was an invalid and used a wheelchair, refused to leave the mansion when ordered to do so, as the IRA intended to set it alight. He insisted on staying, they left, and the mansion still stands.

The 29th and last Knight (dormant or extinct) was Desmond FitzGerald, son of Desmond Wyndham Otho FitzGerald, 28th Knight of Glin. He had a MFA degree from Harvard University. He was married, firstly in 1966, to Louise Vava Henriette Lucie Le Bailly de La Falaise, the daughter of Count Alain de la Falaise and his wife, the former Maxime Birley. By his second, the former Olda Ann Willes, whom he married in 1970, he had three daughters: Catherine (previously married to Edward Lambton, 7th Earl of Durham, remarried in 2010 to Dominic West), Nesta and Honor. He represented the art auctioneers Christie's in Ireland and was elected president of the Irish Georgian Society. Since he had no male heir, the title Knight of Glin became apparently dormant or extinct. There has been some speculation that there is an heir male of the body needing to prove their claim to the title, surviving through the 24th Knight of Glin, Lt. Col. John Fraunceis FitzGerald's second son Edmond Urmston McLeod FitzGerald, who was born in 1817 at Glin Castle and who married Ellen Sullivan, born in Ireland, 1822, died in Ogdensburg, New York, United States, in December 1895. Children, born in Ireland: Edmond Urmston, deceased. Richard, mentioned below. John Fraunceis, living in Ogdensburg, Margaret. Gerald, who died in Ireland.

== Knights of Glin ==
Knights of Glin

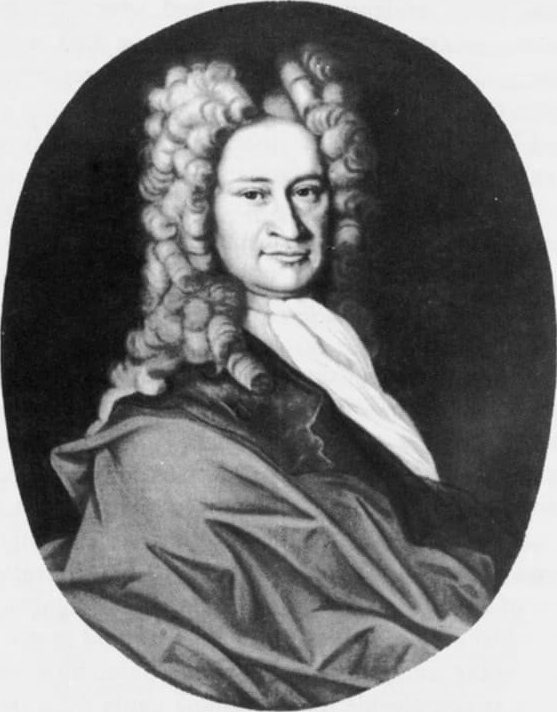
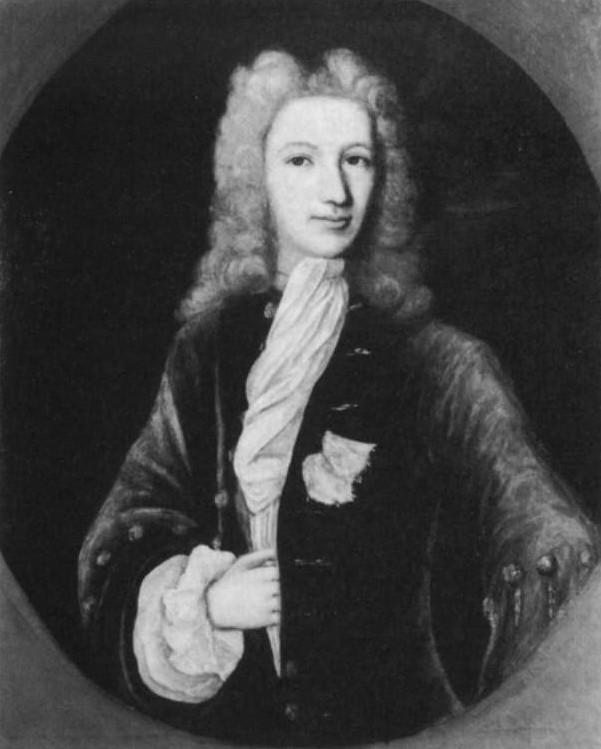
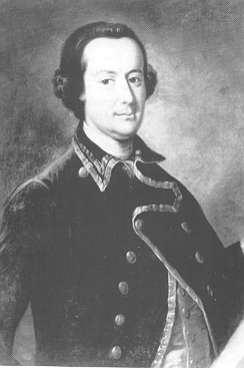
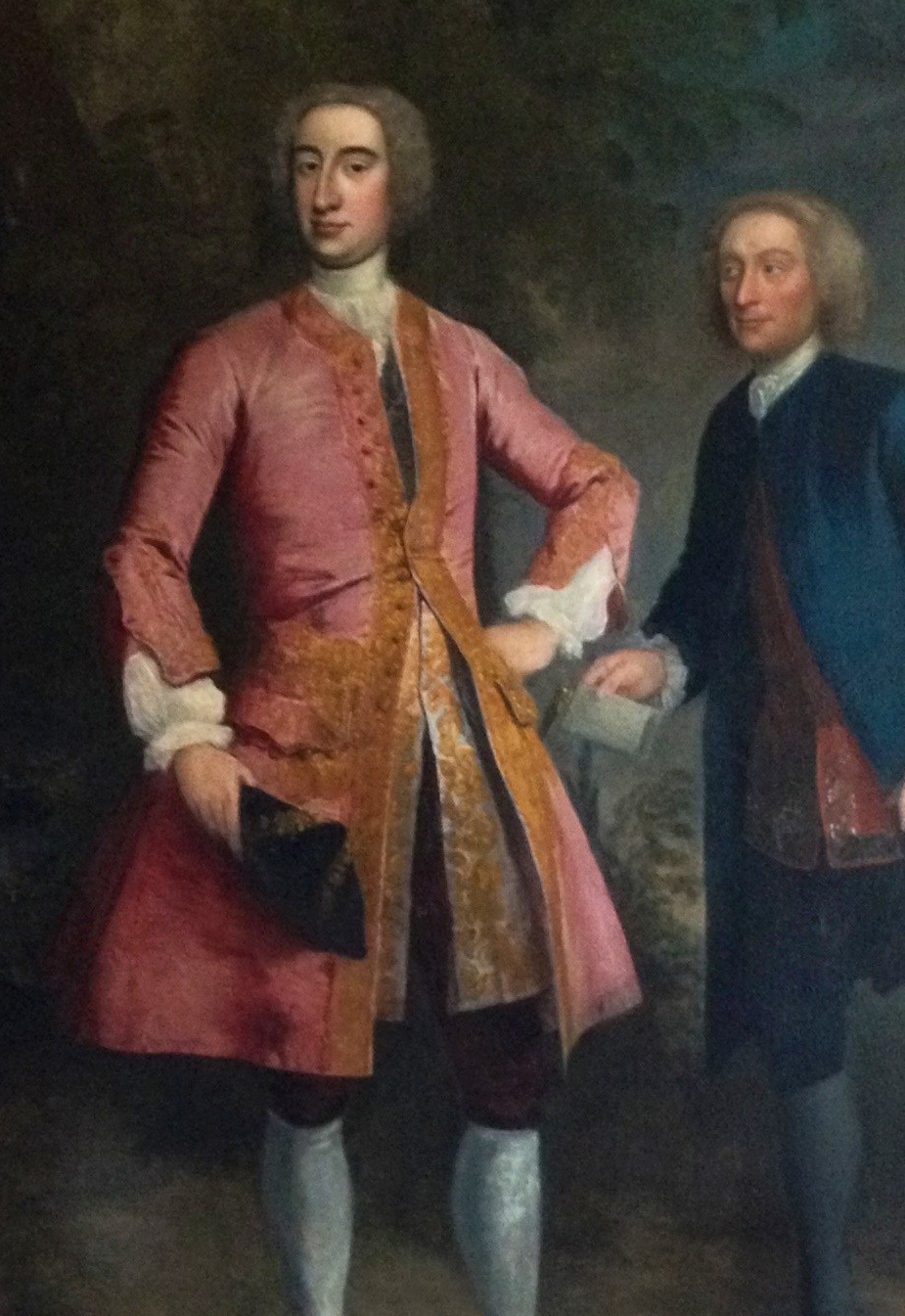
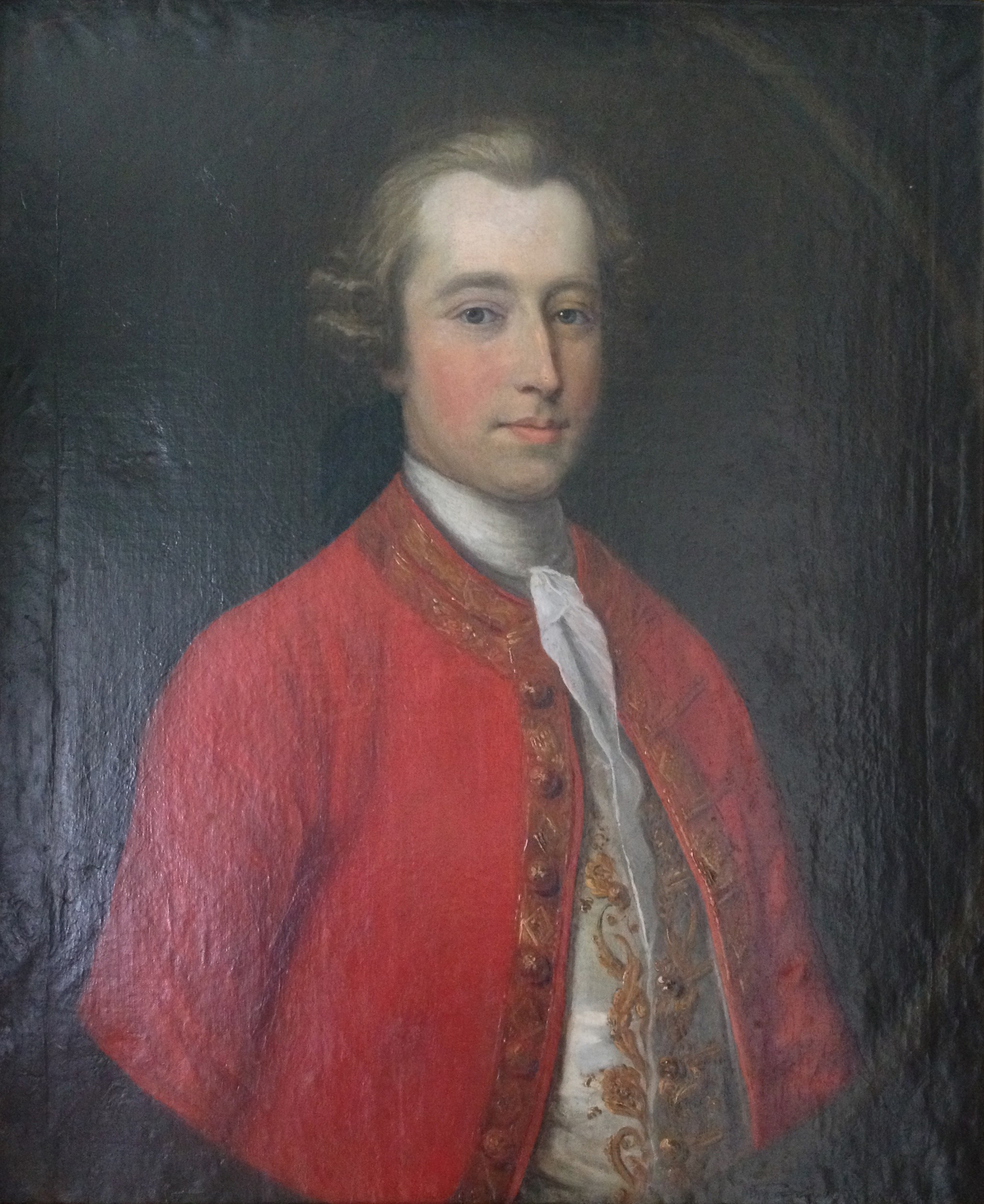
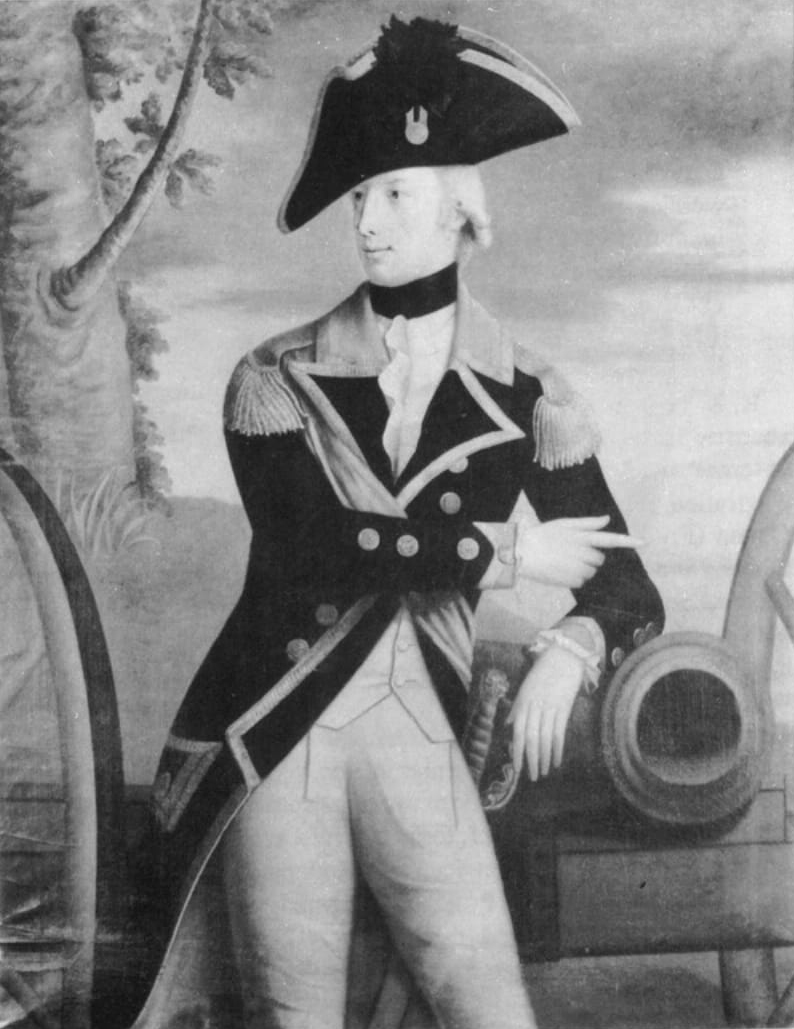
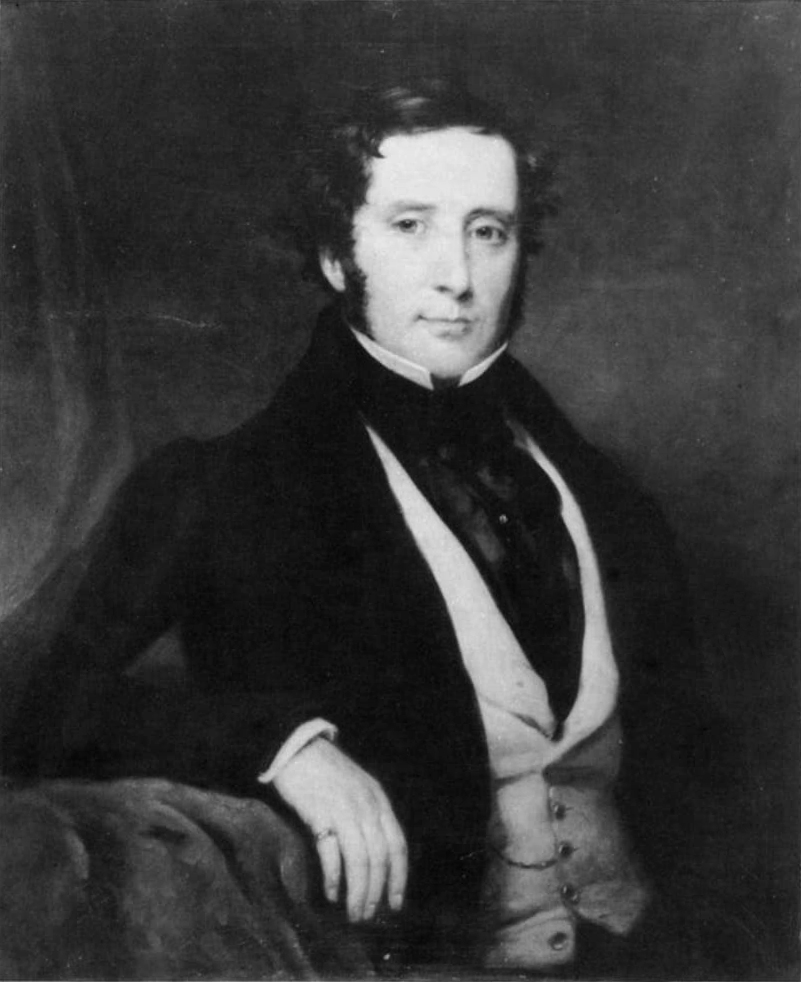
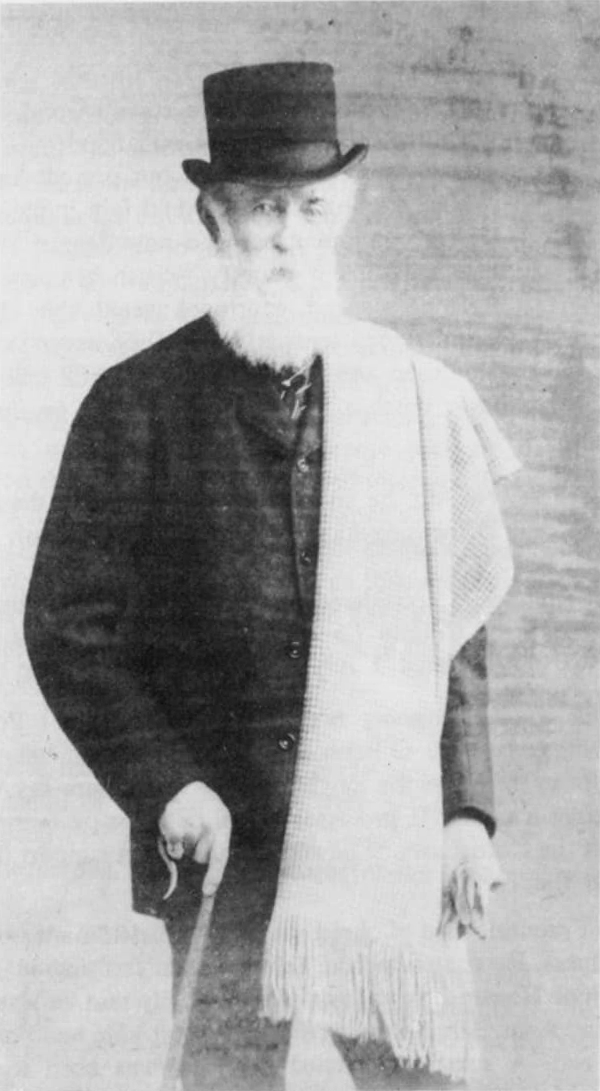
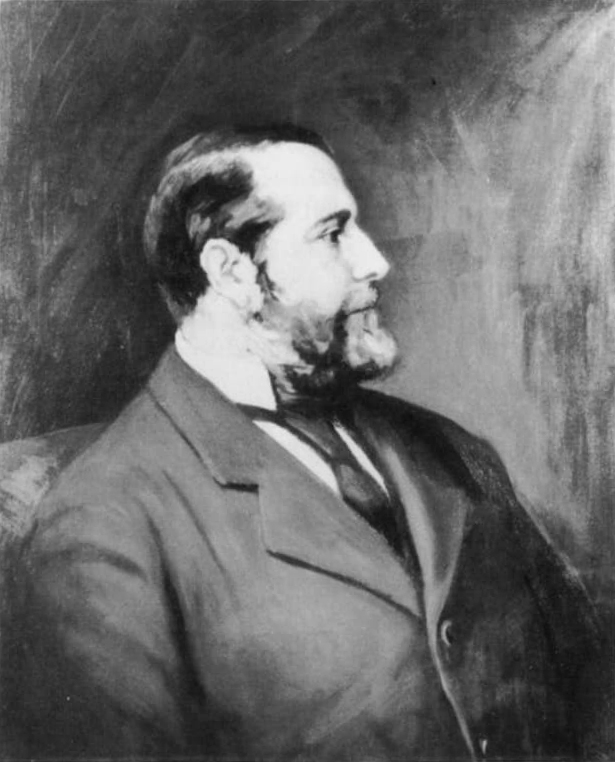
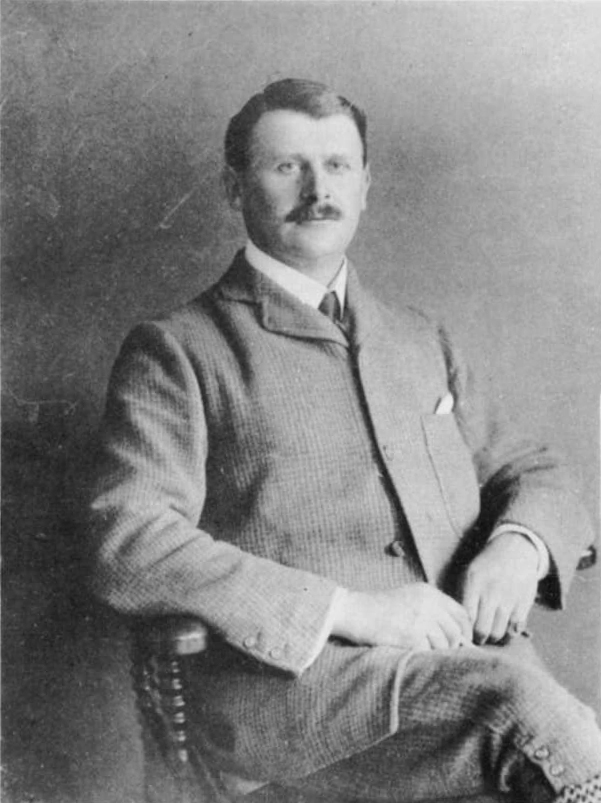
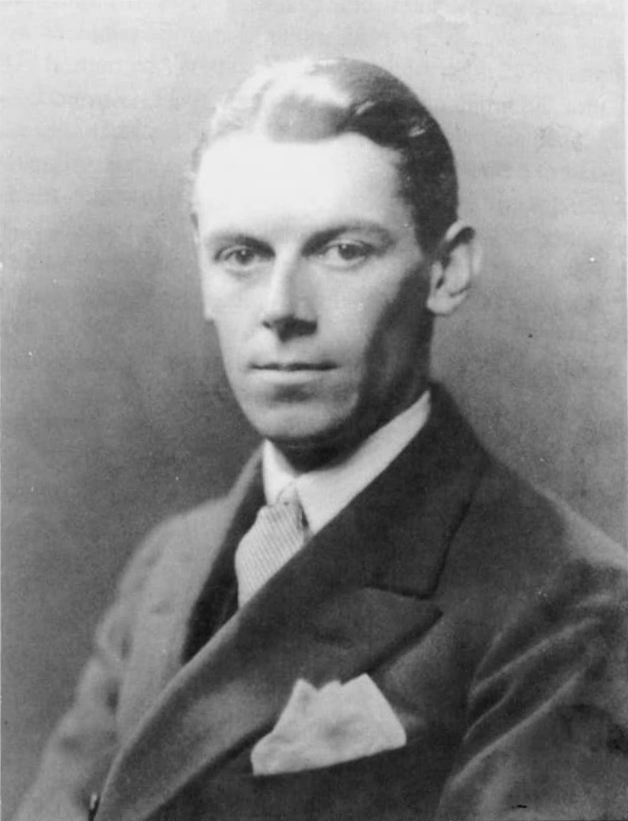
John Fitz Thomas, Lord of Desmond
Maurice Fitz John heir killed 1261 with father	#1; 1299- John Fitz John	Gilbert Fitz John; 1st White Knight	Maurice "Buidhe"; Fitz John; 1st Knight of Kerry
Earls of Desmond	#2; Thomas Fitz John	FitzGibbon; The White Knight	Knight of Kerry
#3; John Fitz Thomas
#4 -1402; Thomas Fitz John
#5; Philip Fitz Thomas
#6; Thomas Fitz Philip
#7 -1503; Edmond Fitz Thomas	#8; 1503- Rev. John Fitz Thomas
#9; Thomas Fitz John
Thomas Fitz Thomas hanged 1567 vita patris	David an Locha
#11; Edmond Fitz Thomas; 1588-1623	#10; Edmond Fitz David; Mc Ruddery usurped title by 1586
#12; 1623-1659; Thomas; Spáinneach; FitzGerald	#13; 1659- John FitzGerald
#14; 1672-1689; Major Gerald FitzGerald
#15; 1689-1730; Thomas Geanncach FitzGerald
#16; 1730-1737; John FitzGerald	#17; 1737-1763; Edmond FitzGerald	#18; 1763-1775; Richard FitzGerald	#19; 1775-1781; Thomas FitzGerald
#20; 1781-1803; John Bateman; FitzGerald
#21; 1803-1854; John Fraunceis; FitzGerald
#22; 1854-1866; John Fraunceis; Eyre FitzGerald
#23; 1866-1895; Desmond John; Edmund FitzGerald
#24; 1895-1936; Desmond FitzJohn; Lloyd FitzGerald
#25; 1936-1949; Desmond Windham; Otho FitzGerald
#26; 1949-2011; Desmond John; Villiers FitzGerald

== See also ==
- Irish nobility
