= Loulou de la Falaise =

English fashion designer (1947–2011)

Loulou de La Falaise
- Born: Louise Vava Lucia Henriette Le Bailly de La Falaise; 4 May 1947; England
- Died: 5 November 2011 (aged 64); Gisors, France
- Known for: Fashion muse, designer
- Spouses: Desmond FitzGerald, 29th Knight of Glin (m. 1966; div. 1970) Thadée Klossowski de Rola (m. 1977)
- Children: 1
- Parent(s): Count Alain Le Bailly de La Falaise; Maxime Birley

Louise Vava Lucia Henriette Le Bailly de La Falaise (French: [lulu də la falɛz]; 4 May 1947 – 5 November 2011), known as Loulou de la Falaise, was an English fashion muse and accessory and jewellery designer associated with Yves Saint Laurent. Author Judith Thurman, writing in The New Yorker magazine, called La Falaise "the quintessential Rive Gauche haute bohémienne".

== Early life ==
Louise Vava Lucia Henriette Le Bailly de La Falaise was born on 4 May 1947 in England, the eldest child and only daughter of Alain, Count de La Falaise (1903–1977), a French writer, translator and publisher, and his second wife, the former Maxime Birley (1922–2009), an Anglo-Irish fashion model, whom photographer Cecil Beaton once told, "You are the only English woman I know who manages to be really chic in really hideous clothes".

Three of her christening names honoured relations: Louise (her father's elder sister, who died as a teenager); Vava (one of the names of her maternal grandmother, Lady Birley); and Henriette (the name of her paternal grandmother, Henriette Hennessy, later comtesse Alain Hocquart de Turtot, a member of the Hennessy cognac family). La Falaise was allegedly baptised not with holy water but with Shocking, the scent by fashion designer Elsa Schiaparelli, her mother's employer.

After her parents' divorce in 1950, following her mother's infidelities and a French court's declaration of her as an unfit mother, Loulou and her brother went to live with foster families until she was seven. After that, La Falaise was enrolled in English boarding schools, and "her school holidays were shared between mother, father, and the second foster family". She attended a boarding school in Switzerland as well as the Lycée Français de New York, though was expelled from each due to her rebellious nature.

=== Family ===
La Falaise's maternal grandfather was portrait painter Sir Oswald Birley, and an uncle was Mark Birley (1930–2007), restaurateur and founder of the London nightclub "Annabel's". Another uncle, her father's elder brother, was Henri de La Falaise, Marquis de La Coudraye, (1898–1972), film director and third husband of American actress Gloria Swanson (1899–1983). Her paternal grandfather was a three-time French Olympic gold medallist in fencing, Louis Gabriel de La Falaise (1866–1910).

Loulou de La Falaise had one sibling, Alexis Richard Dion Oswald Le Bailly de La Falaise, (1948–2004), a furniture designer, who appeared in the Andy Warhol film Tub Girls. After the 1972 death of her uncle without issue, her father became the Marquis de La Coudraye. After her father's death in 1977 her Alexis assumed the title Marquis de La Coudraye (until his death in 2004); is now held by his son Daniel de La Falaise, a professional chef and food writer.

Her niece, Lucie Le Bailly de La Falaise (born 19 February 1973), a model, is the wife of Marlon Richards, son of Keith Richards and Anita Pallenberg. Her nephew, Daniel Le Bailly de La Falaise (born 6 September 1970), is a professional chef and food writer and the current Marquis de La Coudraye.

=== Name ===
The family's actual surname is Le Bailly, though members have used Le Bailly de La Falaise, referring to an ancestral estate, since the mid 19th century; it is typically abbreviated to de La Falaise.

== Career ==
La Falaise moved to New York City in the late 1960s, where she briefly modelled for American Vogue before turning to design printed fabrics for Halston. Late in the decade, she worked as a junior editor at the British society magazine Queen, during which time she met Saint Laurent. Eventually, she moved to Paris, where she joined his haute-couture firm in 1972. Responding to a description of her as a Saint Laurent muse in 2010, La Falaise responded, "For me, a muse is someone who looks glamorous but is quite passive, whereas I was very hard-working. I worked from 9 am to 9 pm, or even 2 am. I certainly wasn't passive."

"Her official task was to bring her eccentric style to accessories and jewellery, and she duly came up with often-chunky designs incorporating large colourful stones, enamel work or rock crystal". La Falaise also inspired Saint Laurent with her inventive wardrobe: "one week she was Desdemona in purple velvet flares and a crown of flowers, the next Marlene with plucked crescent-shaped eyebrows". In 2002, when Saint Laurent retired, La Falaise began producing her own clothing and jewellery designs. As reported in The New York Times by fashion writer Cathy Horyn, "The clothing line captured much of her rare taste—well-cut blazers in the best English tweeds, French sailor pants in linen, striped silk blouses with cheeky black lace edging, masculine walking coats with fur linings, and gorgeous knits in perfectly chosen colors".

She also designed cloisonné boxes and porcelain vases for Asiatides, as well as jewellery for the boutique of the Majorelle Garden in Marrakesh, Morocco.

After more than three decades of designing jewellery and accessories for Saint Laurent, La Falaise launched her own fashion business, designing ready-to-wear, costume jewellery, and accessories, which were retailed in the U.S. as well as two Loulou de La Falaise shops in Paris.

She sold simplified versions of her jewellery designs in a line created for the Home Shopping Network and created costume jewellery for Oscar de la Renta. She operated two of her own shops in Paris, one of which was designed by her brother, Alexis.

One year Andre León Talley invited her and her mother to a party celebrating the beginning of the Paris couture shows. As retold in The New Yorker by Hilton Als, while the group was assembling for a photograph at the end of the party, in response from a direction by her mother about where to stand: "LouLou de La Falaise said, 'I will stand there only if André tries not to look like such a nigger dandy.' Several people laughed, loudly. None laughed louder than André Leon Talley. But it seemed to me that a couple of things happened before he started laughing: he shuttered his eyes, his grin grew larger, and his back went rigid, as he saw his belief in the durability of glamour and allure shatter before him in a million glistening bits. Talley attempted to pick those pieces up. He sighed, then stood and said, 'Come on, children. Let's see something. Let's visit the House of Galliano.'"

However, Talley strongly disliked The New Yorker piece and defended his friendship with La Falaise, saying in a 2020 interview with Vulture: “That profile does not exist in the universe in which I walk, this writer does not exist. He got it wrong.” […] “Loulou was one of my greatest friends. A dear loyal friend. She could have said it, but for her, that was not racist to say what she said. I will not repeat it. But it did not come from a place of racism.” In another interview with W Magazine that same year, Talley elaborated: “When people have done racist things, my faith and my Christianity says to me: It is wrong, yet they can be forgiven. They have wronged me, it is wrong what they have done, but they can be forgiven. Especially in terms of Loulou de la Falaise, who was a friend. This was taken out of context when this man wrote this piece in the New Yorker magazine. He took it out of context. […] “If I chose to walk away when I was told that someone called me “Queen Kong,” if I chose to forgive Loulou de la Falaise for using the term “n—r dandy,” I forgave because there were mountains of layers of complex relationships—with Loulou de la Falaise, particularly, that showed me that perhaps she was high on substances the point at which she said that at a party, a luncheon. She was a woman who depended a lot on substance abuse, alcohol and whatever else she did, she drank a lot and she lived and she partied hard, but this was, for her, a slap. She perhaps was angry with me and thought that this was the best way to hurt me, but as I laughed, and I did laugh when she said that, I was shocked at the same time. […] And if you really want to go back, someone should have said to the person who wrote that in the New Yorker, “Go back and look at Nancy Cunard’s great anthology called Negro.” She published a great anthology called Negro, and this thing was a jazz term called “n—r dandy.” Now, Loulou said it out of context. She should not have said that. But she was by no means a racist.”

== Marriages ==
On 6 October 1966, she married Desmond FitzGerald, 29th Knight of Glin (1937–2011), an Irish nobleman. They separated the following year and divorced in 1970. Her title upon marrying the knight was Madam FitzGerald.

After her divorce, she dated Spanish architect Ricardo Bofill in the 1970s.

On 11 June 1977, she married Thadée Klossowski de Rola, a French writer, who is the younger son of the painter Balthus in Paris, France. She wore a harem-and-turban ensemble from Yves Saint Laurent Rive Gauche. They had one child: Anna Klossowski de Rola, co-founder of the contemporary art collection called "MGM."

== Death ==
La Falaise died at Gisors' hospital, France, on 5 November 2011. The cause was not specified, other than as the result of a "long illness". An obituary published in Women's Wear Daily stated, "According to sources, de la Falaise was diagnosed with lung cancer last June, but implored intimates to keep her health a private matter".

== Ancestry ==
Ancestors of Loulou de la Falaise

16. Philippe Louis Venant Le Bailly de La Falaise
8. Gabriel César Henri Le Bailly de La Falaise, Marquis de La Coudraye
17. Antoinette Le Veneur de Beauvais
4. Louis Venant Gabriel Le Bailly de La Falaise
18. Charles Joseph August de Maynard de La Claye
9. Augustine Marie Armande de Maynard de La Claye
19. Louise Marie Adélaïde de Chantreau
2. Alain Le Bailly de La Falaise, Marquis de La Coudraye
20. Auguste Hennessy
10. Richard Hennessy
21. Irène d'Anthès
5. Henriette Hennessy
22. Frédèrick Hennessy
11. Martha Lucy Hennessy
23. Julia Perkins
1. Louise Vava Lucia Henriette Le Bailly de La Falaise
24. Joseph Hornby Birley
12. Hugh Francis Birley
25. Frances Dix
6. Sir Oswald Birley
26. George McCorquodale
13. Elizabeth McCorquodale
27. Louisa Kate Honan
3. Maxime Birley
28. Ebenezer Pike
14. Robert Pike
29. Lydia Clibborn Pike
7. Rhoda Pike
30. Lt.-Col. John Stanley Howard
15. Catherina Henrietta Howard
31. Mary Louisa N.

== Sources ==
- Columbia, David Patrick (27 August 2007). "New Yorker Mark Birley Passes: the man who turned built-in-elegance into a centimillion dollar restaurant empire". San Francisco Sentinel.
- Petkanas, Christopher (2018). Loulou & Yves: the untold story of Loulou de la Falaise and the House of Saint Laurent (First ed.). New York: St. Martin's Press. ISBN 9781250051691.
