= Edward Lambton, 7th Earl of Durham =

British musician

The Right Honourable The Earl of Durham
- Born: Edward Richard Lambton; 19 October 1961 (age 64); London, England
- Spouses: Christabel Mary McEwen (m. 1983; div. 1995) Catherine FitzGerald (m. 1995; div. 2002) Marina Hanbury (m. 2011)
- Children: 5
- Parent(s): Antony Lambton; Belinda Blew-Jones
- Relatives: Lady Lucinda Lambton (sister); Lady Anne Lambton (sister); Freda Dudley Ward (great-aunt)

Edward Richard Lambton, 7th Earl of Durham (born 19 October 1961), commonly known as Ned Lambton, is a British peer and musician. He has played guitar in a country band named Pearl, TN.

== Life and career ==
He was born in 1961, the youngest child and only son of Belinda Blew-Jones and Antony, Viscount Lambton, who was the eldest surviving son of John Lambton, 5th Earl of Durham. After five daughters, a bonfire was lit at the top of Penshaw Hill (formerly part of the Lambton Estate) to mark his birth as heir to his father's estates and titles.

On 23 April 1962, he was baptised by Maurice Harland, Bishop of Durham, in the church of St Barnabas, Burnmoor, and an ox was roasted as part of the celebrations. His godparents were former Prime Minister Anthony Eden, the Earl of Avon; Prince Stanisław Albrecht Radziwiłł; journalist Joseph Alsop, and socialite Babe Paley. Lady Lucinda Lambton, the broadcaster, is the eldest of his five sisters.

His maternal grandparents were Douglas Holden Blew-Jones and the former Violet Hilda Margaret Birkin. Her sister was Freda Dudley Ward, the mistress of Edward, Prince of Wales, before his relationship with Thelma Furness and then Wallis Simpson.

Upon his paternal grandfather's death on 4 February 1970, Lambton's father succeeded as 6th Earl of Durham but disclaimed his peerage titles on 23 February that same year. During this short period, Lambton was known by the courtesy title Viscount Lambton, but afterwards was styled Lord Durham (as if using the courtesy title Baron Durham) to avoid confusion with his father, who improperly continued to style himself Lord Lambton.

Lambton stood for the Referendum Party in his father's former constituency of Berwick-upon-Tweed in the 1997 general election, gaining 3.4% of the vote.

He succeeded his father as 7th Earl of Durham in 2006, and he has been involved in an inheritance dispute with some of his sisters. Lambton owns Villa Cetinale, a 17th-century villa in Tuscany that was inherited from his father.

== Marriages and children ==
Lambton has been married three times and divorced twice. In 1983, he married Christabel Mary McEwen, daughter of Rory McEwen (a younger son of Sir John McEwen, 1st Baronet) and Romana von Hofmannsthal (a daughter of Raimund von Hofmannsthal and Ava Alice Muriel Astor). They had one son:

- Frederick Lambton, Viscount Lambton (born 23 February 1985).

Lambton and McEwen divorced in 1995. She has since married the musician Jools Holland. On 19 October 1995, Lambton married Catherine FitzGerald, an Anglo-Irish aristocrat who is a daughter of Desmond FitzGerald, 29th Knight of Glin, and Olda Ann Willes. Their marriage did not produce any children, and they divorced in 2002. She is now married to actor Dominic West. Lambton also has a daughter, Molly (born 2000), from another relationship.

In January 2011, Lambton married 28-year-old ex-model Marina Hanbury, who worked as a parliamentary assistant to Kate Hoey, M.P., until 2010. Marina's sister is Rose, Marchioness of Cholmondeley. He and Marina have three children:

- Lady Stella Rose Lambton (born 25 October 2011).
- The Hon. Claud Timothy Lambton (born 1 September 2015).
- Lady Acony Belle Lambton (born 8 November 2017).

Peerage of the United Kingdom
Disclaimed Title last held by Antony Lambton	Earl of Durham; 2006–present	Incumbent
