= Desmond FitzGerald, 29th Knight of Glin =

Irish hereditary knight (1937–2011)

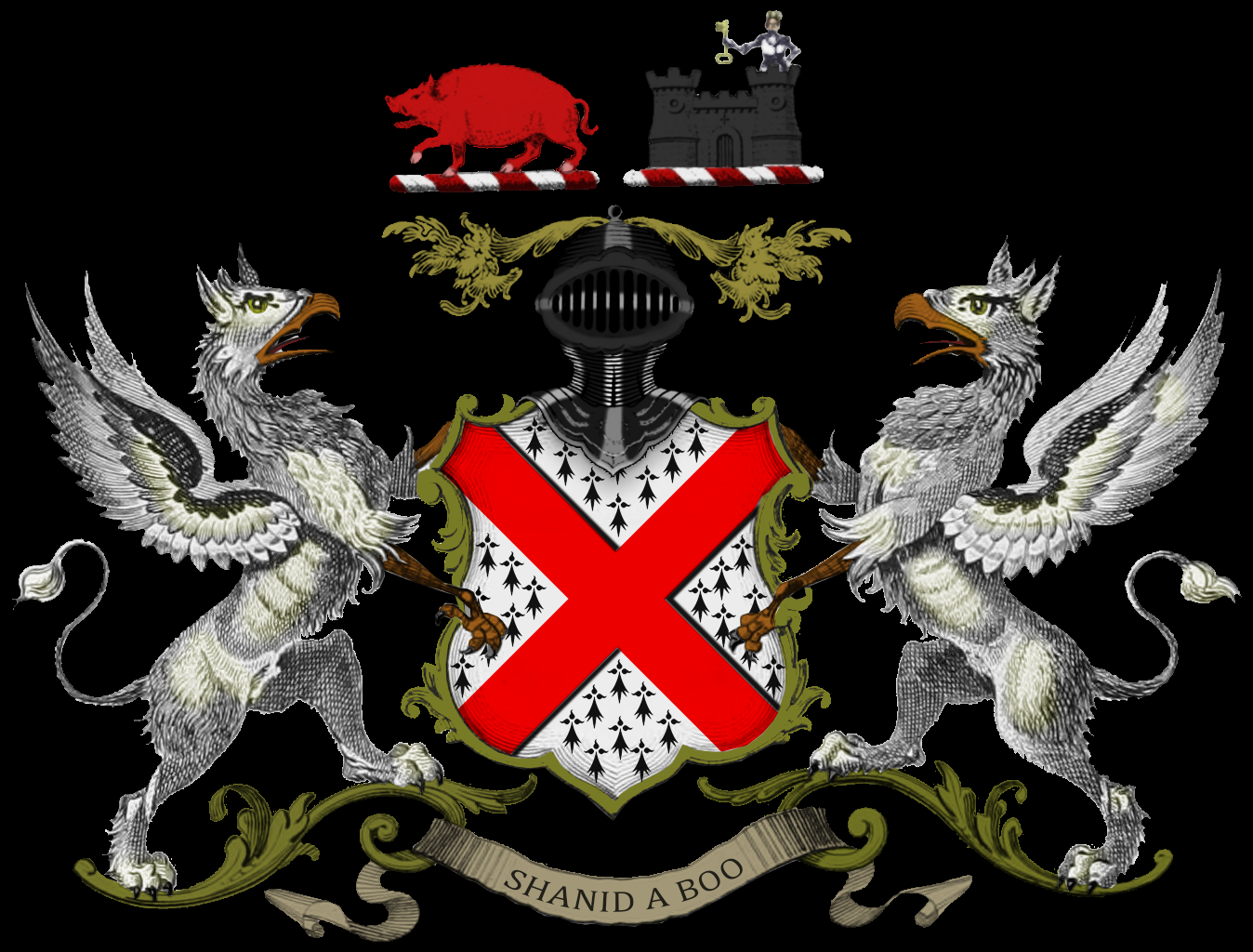
Arms of the Knight of Glin

Desmond John Villiers FitzGerald, 29th Knight of Glin, FSA (13 July 1937 – 14 September 2011), was an Anglo-Irish hereditary knight and author. FitzGerald served as the President of the Irish Georgian Society from 1991 until his death in 2011.

== Career ==
The only son of Desmond FitzGerald, 28th Knight of Glin (1901–1949), and Veronica Villiers (younger daughter of Ernest Villiers MP), FitzGerald was born at Paddington, London, into an ancient Hiberno-Norman aristocratic family from County Limerick and was educated at the University of British Columbia and Harvard University. He worked at the Victoria and Albert Museum in London, in the furniture department.

FitzGerald later returned to Ireland, and became active in conservation issues, becoming involved with the Irish Georgian Society; he was appointed its president in 1991. He also represented the Christie's art auctioneers in Ireland. He died at Dublin in 2011.

== Family ==
On 6 October 1966, FitzGerald married firstly Loulou de La Falaise (sep. 1967; div. 1970), only daughter of Count Alain Le Bailly de La Falaise. He married secondly on 12 August 1970, Olda Ann Willes, only daughter of Major Thomas Willes TD and Georgina née Wakefield-Saunders; his widow is styled Madam FitzGerald and divides her time between homes in Limerick, Dublin and London.

His three daughters are: landscape designer Catherine (who married actor Dominic West in 2010 and was previously married to Ned Lambton), artist Nesta, and Honor. At the time of his death, he had four grandchildren – Dora, Senan, Francis, and Rose, as well as a step-granddaughter, Martha.

== Noble title ==
FitzGerald was the last Black Knight; as he had no sons and the family title cannot pass to a daughter, the hereditary knighthood of Glin became dormant upon his death. A similar title, the Knight of Kerry, is held by his distant cousins.

== Glin Castle ==
FitzGerald divided his time between Glin Castle, Glin, County Limerick, which he inherited as a child, and his Dublin townhouse.

He devoted his life to restoring the belongings of the castle, which had been sold due to previous financial difficulties, and rebuilding and finishing the remaining parts of the estate including the Georgian house that had remained incomplete for centuries.

== Ancestry ==
Ancestors of Desmond FitzGerald, 29th Knight of Glin

16. John Fraunceis Eyre FitzGerald, 25th Knight of Glin, the Cracked Knight
8. Desmond John Edmund FitzGerald, 26th Knight of Glin
17. Clara Anne Blennerhassett
4. Desmond FitzJohn Lloyd FitzGerald, 27th Knight of Glin
18. Rev. Michael Lloyd Apjohn (d. 1871)
9. Isabella Lloyd Apjohn
19. Elizabeth Barnes (d. 1887)
2. Desmond FitzGerald, 28th Knight of Glin
20. Edwin Wyndham-Quin, 3rd Earl of Dunraven and Mount-Earl
10. Windham Wyndham-Quin, 4th Earl of Dunraven and Mount-Earl
21. Florence Goold
5. Lady Rachel Wyndham-Quin
22. Lord Charles Lennox Kerr
11. Florence Kerr
23. Charlotte Hanmer
1. Desmond FitzGerald, 29th Knight of Glin
24. Thomas Villiers
12. Rev. Charles Villiers
25. Charlotte Harte
6. Ernest Villiers
26. William George Daniel-Tyssen
13. Florence Tyssen-Amherst
27. Amelia Amhurst
3. Veronica Villiers
28. Sir John Guest, 1st Baronet
14. Ivor Guest, 1st Baron Wimborne
29. Lady Charlotte Elizabeth Bertie
7. Hon. Elaine Guest
30. John Spencer-Churchill, 7th Duke of Marlborough
15. Lady Cornelia Spencer-Churchill
31. Lady Frances Vane

== See also ==
- FitzGerald baronets

== Sources ==
- Book about Desmond FitzGerald: The Last Knight: A Tribute to Desmond Fitzgerald, 29th Knight of Glin by Robert O'Byrne, Lilliput Press, September 2013;ISBN 9781843514084.

== Publications ==
- FitzGerald, Desmond, and James Peill, with photography by James Fennell. The Irish Country House, New York, Vendome Press, 2010 ISBN 978-0-86565-261-3 ISBN 978-0-86565-282-8 OCLC 436387203
- FitzGerald, Desmond, and James Peill. Irish Furniture, New Haven, Yale University Press, 2007 ISBN 978-0-300-11715-8 OCLC 64336179

Non-profit organization positions
Preceded by Desmond Guinness	President of the Irish Georgian Society; 1991–2011	Succeeded by Patrick Guinness
Titles of nobility (Ireland)
Preceded by Desmond FitzGerald	Knight of Glin; 1949–2011	Succeeded by Dormant
