= Bischoffsheim family =

German-Belgian Jewish banking family

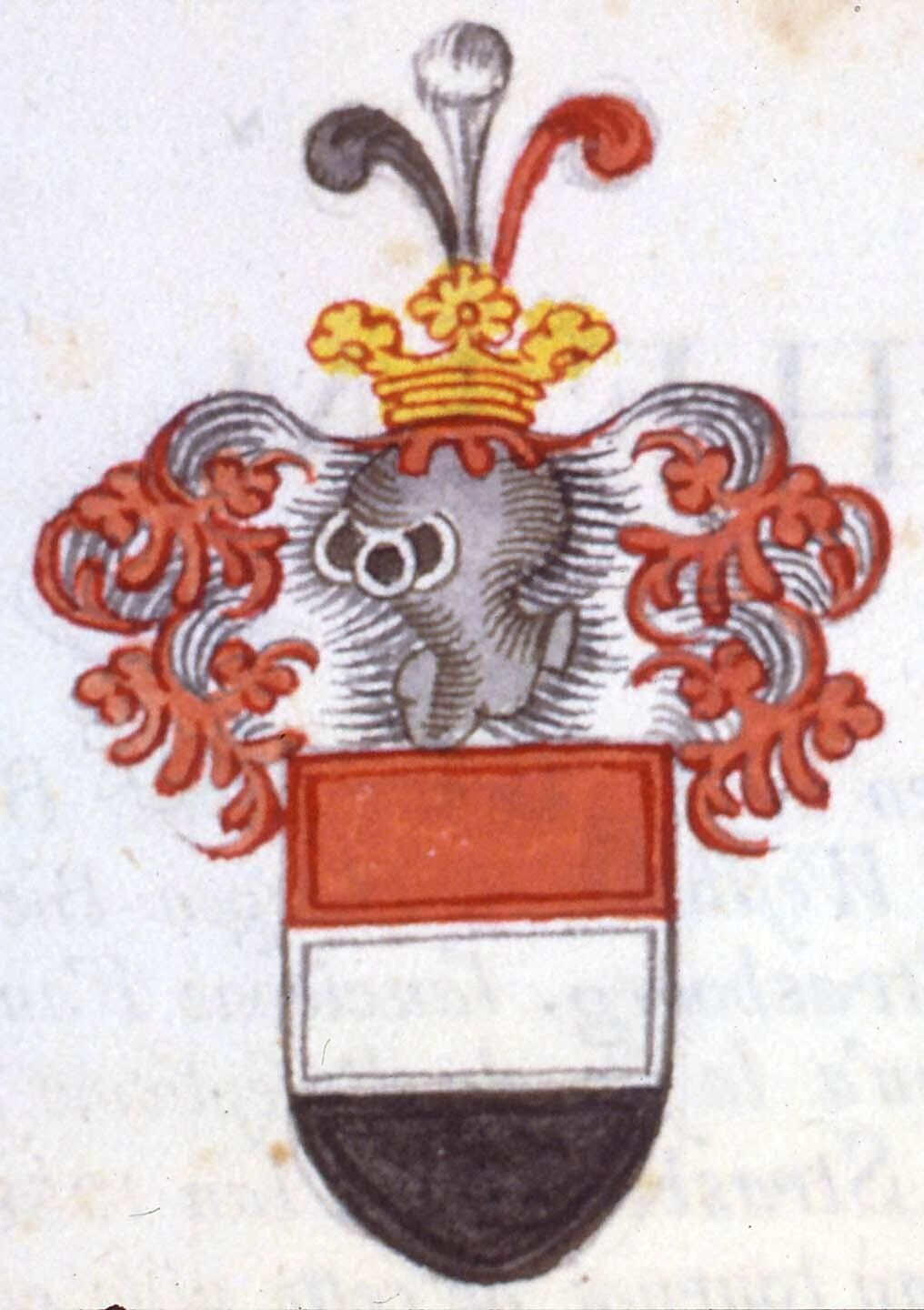
Coat of arms of the Bischoffsheim family

The Bischoffsheim family is a family of German-Belgian Jewish descent known for their success in banking. It can be traced back to Raphaël Nathan Bischoffsheim, an army contractor native of Tauberbischofsheim, in the Electorate of Mainz. The family was particularly interwoven with the Goldschmidt family of Frankfurt am Main; the two families intermarried over the generations and jointly managed Bischoffsheim, Goldschmidt & Cie bank, which they eventually merged into Banque de Crédit et de Dépôt des Pays-Bas in 1863.

== Family tree ==
- Raphaël Nathan Bischoffsheim (1773–1814), army contractor of the Electorate of Mainz
  - Louis-Raphaël Bischoffsheim (1800–1873), banker, founder of Bischoffsheim, Goldschmidt & Cie married to Amalie Goldschmidt (1804–1887), daughter of Hayum-Salomon Goldschmidt (1772–1843), banker
    - Raphaël Louis Bischoffsheim (1823–1906), banker, politician, patron
    - Henri Louis Bischoffsheim (1829–1908), banker, married to Clarissa Biedermann (1837–1922), daughter of Josef Biedermann (1809–1867), Habsburg court jeweler
      - Ellen Bischoffsheim (1857–1933), politician, married to William Cuffe (1845–1898), the 4th Earl of Desart
      - Amélie Bischoffsheim (1858–1947), married to Maurice FitzGerald (1844–1916), 2nd Baronet of Valentia
  - Amalia Bischoffsheim (1802–1877), married to August Bamberger (1790–1858), cloth merchant and banker
    - Rudolph Bamberger (1821–1900), banker, married to Bertha Seligmann (1827–1915)
      - Franz Bamberger (1855–1926), banker, married to Anna Klara Levino (1865–1942), pianist, studied under Clara Schumann
        - Ludwig Bamberger (1892–1969), film director
    - Ludwig Bamberger (1823–1899), banker, co-founder of Deutsche Bank
    - Henri Bamberger (1826–1908), banker, co-founder of Banque de Paris et des Pays-Bas, married to Amalie von Hirsch, sister of Moritz von Hirsch (1831–1896).
    - Eugénie Bamberger (1828–?), married to Benjamin Lévy (1817–1884)
      - Raphaël-Georges Lévy (1853–1933), politician, married to Marguerite Halphen (1861–1929)
    - Clara Bamberger (1833–1907), married to Elias Landsberg (1820–1888)
      - Ernst Landsberg (1860–1927), jurist, married to Anna Silverberg (1878–1938)
        - Paul Ludwig Landsberg (1901–1944), philosopher
    - Henriette Bamberger (1841–1894), married to Michel Bréal (1832–1915), philologist
  - Jonathan-Raphaël Bischoffsheim (1808–1883), banker, married to Henriette Goldschmidt, daughter of Hayum-Salomon Goldschmidt (1772–1843), banker
    - Clara Bischoffsheim (1833–1899), married to Maurice de Hirsch (1831–1896), banker, founder of the Jewish Colonization Association
      - adopted Maurice Arnold de Forest-Bischoffsheim (1879–1968), English aviator, politician
    - Regine Bischoffsheim (1834–1905), married to Leopold Benedict Goldschmidt (1830–1904), banker, grandson of Hayum-Salomon Goldschmidt (1772–1843), banker
    - Ferdinand-Raphaël Bischoffsheim (1837–1909), banker, married to Mary Paine (1859–1900)
      - Maurice Bischoffsheim (1875–1904), banker, married to Marie-Thérèse de Chevigné (1880–1963)
        - Marie-Laure Bischoffsheim (1902–1970), philanthropist, married to Charles de Noailles (1891–1981)
    - Hortense Bischoffsheim (1843–1901), married to Georges Montefiore-Levi (1832–1906), industrialist
  - Clara Bischoffsheim (1810–1876), married to Meyer Joseph Cahen d'Anvers (1804–1881), banker
    - Louis Raphaël Cahen d'Anvers (1837–1922), banker, married to Louise de Morpurgo (1845–1926)
      - Robert Cahen d'Anvers (1871–1931), banker, married to Sonia Warshawsky
        - Yvonne Cahen d'Anvers (1899–1977), married to Anthony Gustav de Rothschild (1887–1961), banker
          - See Rothschild banking family of England
      - Irène Cahen d'Anvers (1872–1963), married to Moïse de Camondo (1860–1935), banker
        - See Camondo family
