= Veveří Castle =

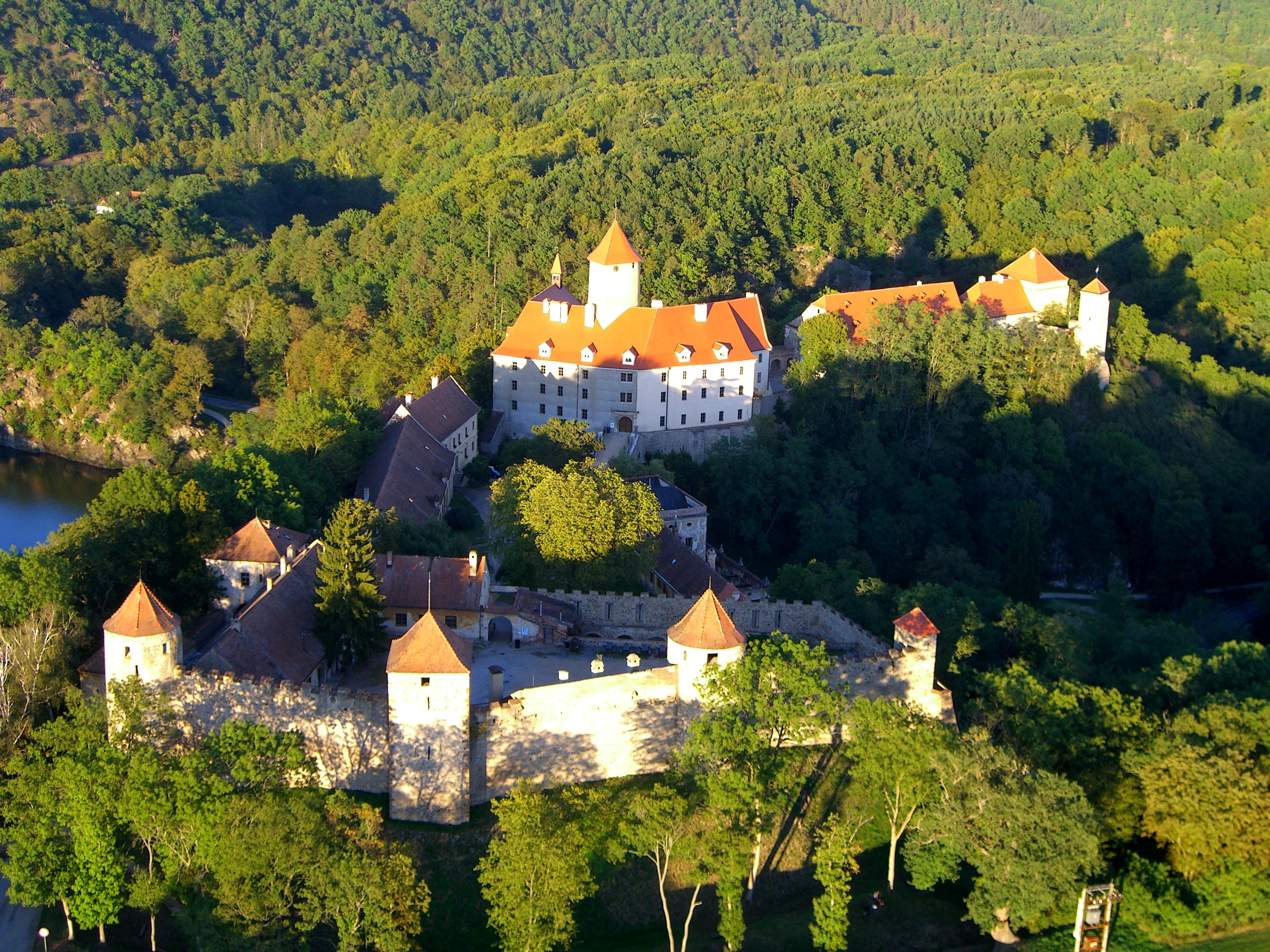
- Veveří Castle
- Interactive map of Veveří Castle
- 49°15′24″N 16°27′42″E
- Location: Brno (formerly Veverská Bítýška)

History
- Built: 1213–1222

Veveří (Czech: hrad Veveří, German: Eichhorn) is an originally ducal and royal castle in Brno in the Czech Republic. It is located about 12 kilometres (7 mi) northwest of Brno city centre on the Svratka River.

== History ==
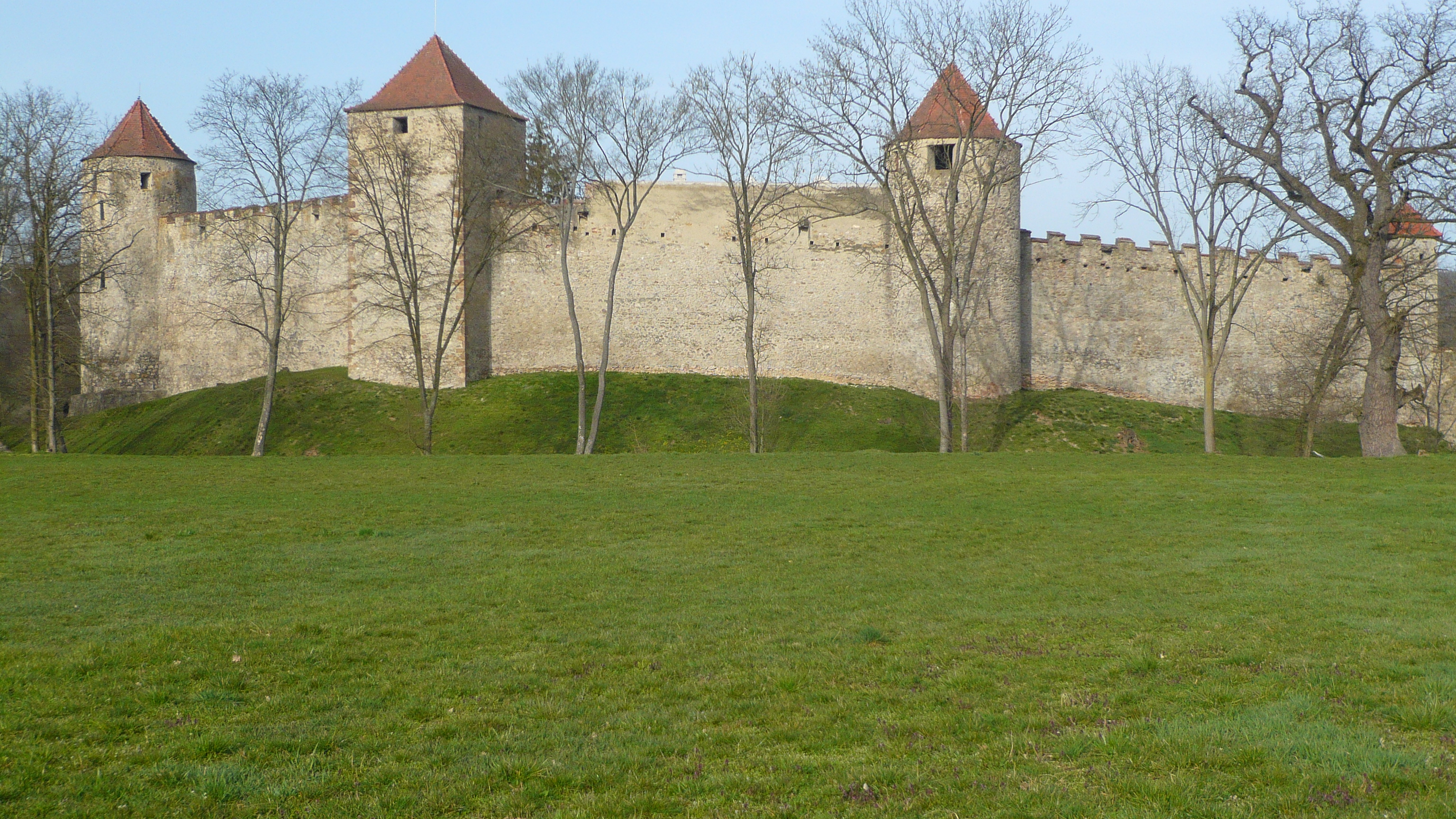
The fortifications and towers made by the Luxembourg dynasty after 1350

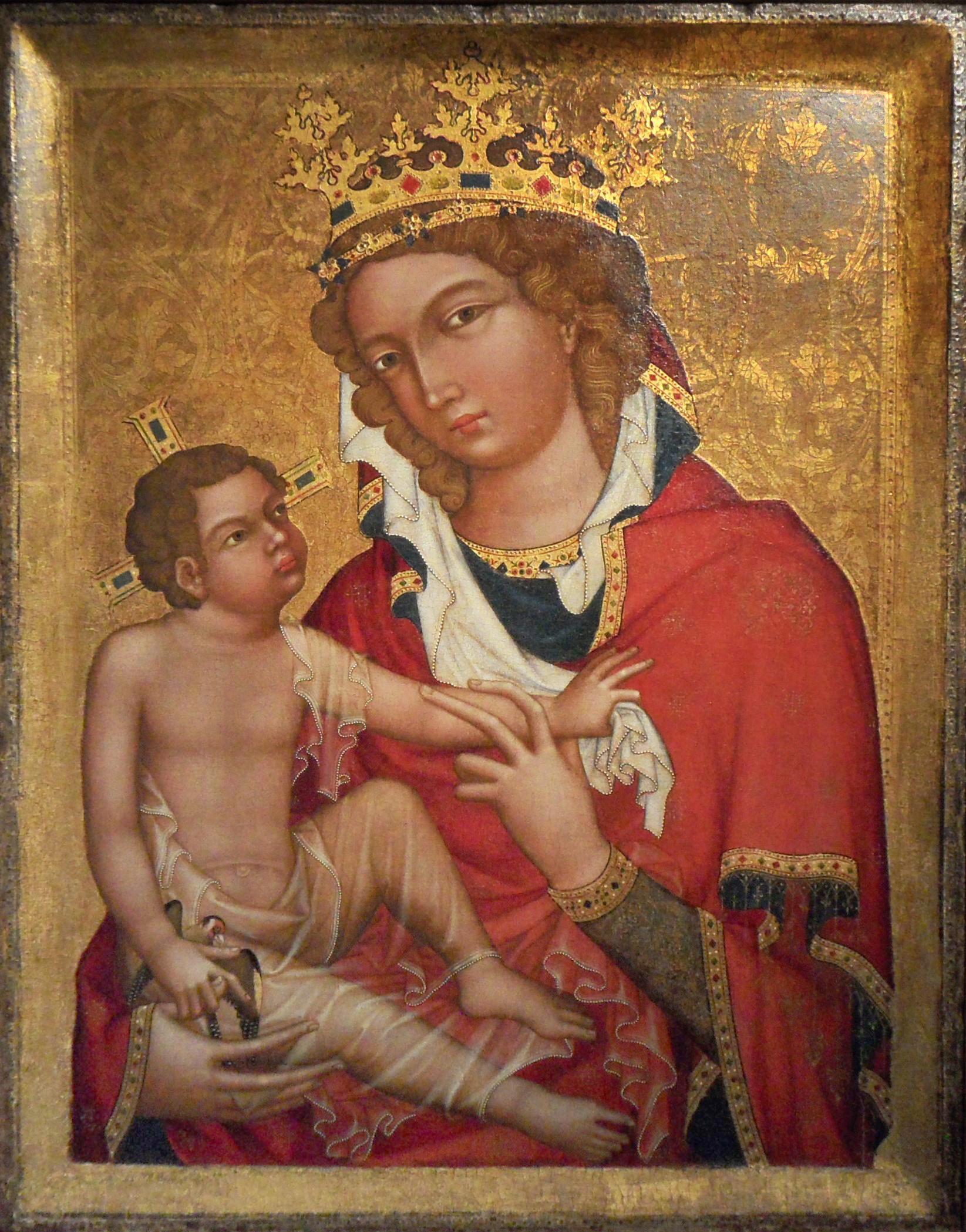
Madonna of Veveri, the most influential painting of gothic art (c. 1350)

=== 11th to 15th centuries ===
According to legend, the castle Veveří (literally "squirrel's" in Czech) was founded by Přemyslid Duke Conrad of Brno in the middle of the 11th century, as a hunting lodge. Nevertheless, the first credible recorded mention about the castle is from the years 1213 and 1222, when King Ottokar I of Bohemia used the fortified castle as a prison for rebellious peers. Initially, it was apparently a wooden or masonry residence situated near the Romanesque church of the Assumption of the Virgin Mary west of the present compound. In the 1220s, a stone castle on the extremity of the rocky promontory behind a deep moat cut out of the rock started to grow. The so-called keep is the only structure which has remained well-preserved from this oldest building stage.

King John of Bohemia pledged the castle to nobleman Jan of Vartemberk in 1311, but his son, Margrave of Moravia Charles (later Holy Roman Emperor Charles IV), received the property as a debt settlement in 1335. Charles' younger brother, Margrave John Henry, then took a fancy to Veveří Castle. He was responsible for the building of its rear part with two towers and an outer ward. In the central area around the keep, he developed the main palace, which included a large hall and the Chapel of St. Procopius (later Chapel of St. Wenceslaus). The present appearance of the compound is the result of these building activities, giving the castle its basic silhouette of a medieval fortress.

The castle was a military-civic centre around a manor until the Hussite Wars. During the Hussite wars, Emperor Sigismund positioned mercenary forces of his son-in-law, Albrecht of Austria, around the castle, but he later pledged it to local nobleman Petr Kutěj in 1424. The Hussites besieged the castle in vain during the years 1428–32. During the second half of the 15th century, the castle was rented by Przemyslaus II of Těšín, who decided to reinforce the castle with the construction of surrounding walls. In 1468, King of Hungary and antiking of Bohemia Matthias Corvinus started his occupation of the castle.

At the end of the 15th century, Václav of Ludanice acquired the castle and became the first representative of his noble family which resided here. But his mismanagement of expenses and debts resulted in the family's eventual sale of manor.

=== Early Modern period ===
During the years 1531–1537, Jan of Pernštejn and Jan of Lipá stayed at Veveří Castle. In successive years, the castle changed hands quickly.

In 1609, Zikmund von Tiefenbach acquired the castle by marriage. Rudolf von Tiefenbach, an older brother of Zikmund, was a Protestant at that time, yet he remained loyal to the Catholic Emperor (and later converted to Catholicism). On November 8, 1620, at the Battle of White Mountain, he and his regiment sided with the Imperial Army (i.e. against rebellious Bohemian Estates). As a reward for its loyalty to the Catholic emperors Tiefenbach family could keep the castle and adjacent manor even after the majority of Bohemian Protestant nobility was confiscated and expelled into exile.

In 1645, the Swedish Army laid siege to Veveří Castle, but their attack was unsuccessful, as the castle was well guarded and the defenders well armed. In 1653, Maria Eva Alžběta of the Sternberg family (Rudolf of Tiefenbach's dowager) inherited the castle. In 1668, Václav Michal of Althan bought the castle and resided there until 1670.

At the end of the 17th century, compound belonged to the House of Collalto. Later, when the House of Sinzendorf (1707–1804) replaced this family, an extensive reconstruction was realized, and since that time, the exterior structure of the castle has remained practically unchanged. In 1742, the Prussian Army, having gained entry by the treachery of the castle steward, pillaged the interior of the estate.

=== 19th and early 20th centuries ===
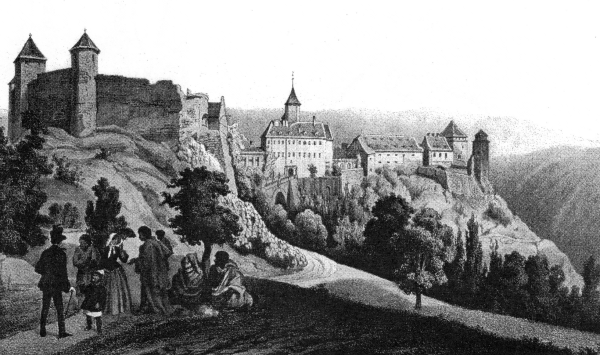
Veveří Castle in the mid-19th century

At the beginning of the 19th century, an industrial magnate, Vilém Mundy, purchased the castle. Although he had earlier arrived in the area as a simple wayfaring traveler, he achieved prominence and wealth after establishing a cloth factory in 1780 and then successfully managing his trade. In essence, he worked his way up until he could own Veveří Castle.

In 1830, a Swedish émigré, Prince Gustavus Wasa, son of the deposed and exiled King of Sweden, Gustav IV, bought the castle and systematically began to rebuild it as the representative seat of his family. This nobleman lived at the estate with his spouse, Princess Louisa. Nevertheless, he divorced in 1844, and the property went to a Greek banker, Baron Georgios Sinas. Before he died in 1856, Sinas divided his family possessions. His granddaughter Helena obtained Veveří Castle, but at that time she was still a juvenile, so the property was administered by her father. Later, Helena married Prince Gregor Ypsilanti; she kept a pompous and very expensive court. In 1886, Ypsilanti died in Paris. Widow Helena sold the estate.

In 1881, the castle had a new owner, Baron Maurice de Hirsch. During this period, he had extensive repairs and renovations completed, including a new iron water supply, roofs, and telephone connections to Obora and the manor house in the nearby town of Rosice. The castle chapel was removed in the process. He died in Hungary in 1896, at the age of 64. His widow Clara de Hirsch died three years later, on 1 April 1899.

At that point, Maurice de Forest inherited his adoptive father's residence in Moravia, then part of the Austrian-Hungarian Empire.During Maurice de Forest's time as proprietor, Winston Churchill and his wife Clementine spent several days in Veveří Castle during their honeymoon journey throughout Europe in 1908.(subscription required) Churchill had stayed there alone twice before.(subscription required) Maurice de Forest and his family resided at Veveří Castle until 1925, when he sold it to the newly created Czechoslovak Republic (which included the territory of Moravia). He received £100,000 from the Czech government.

=== WWII and after ===
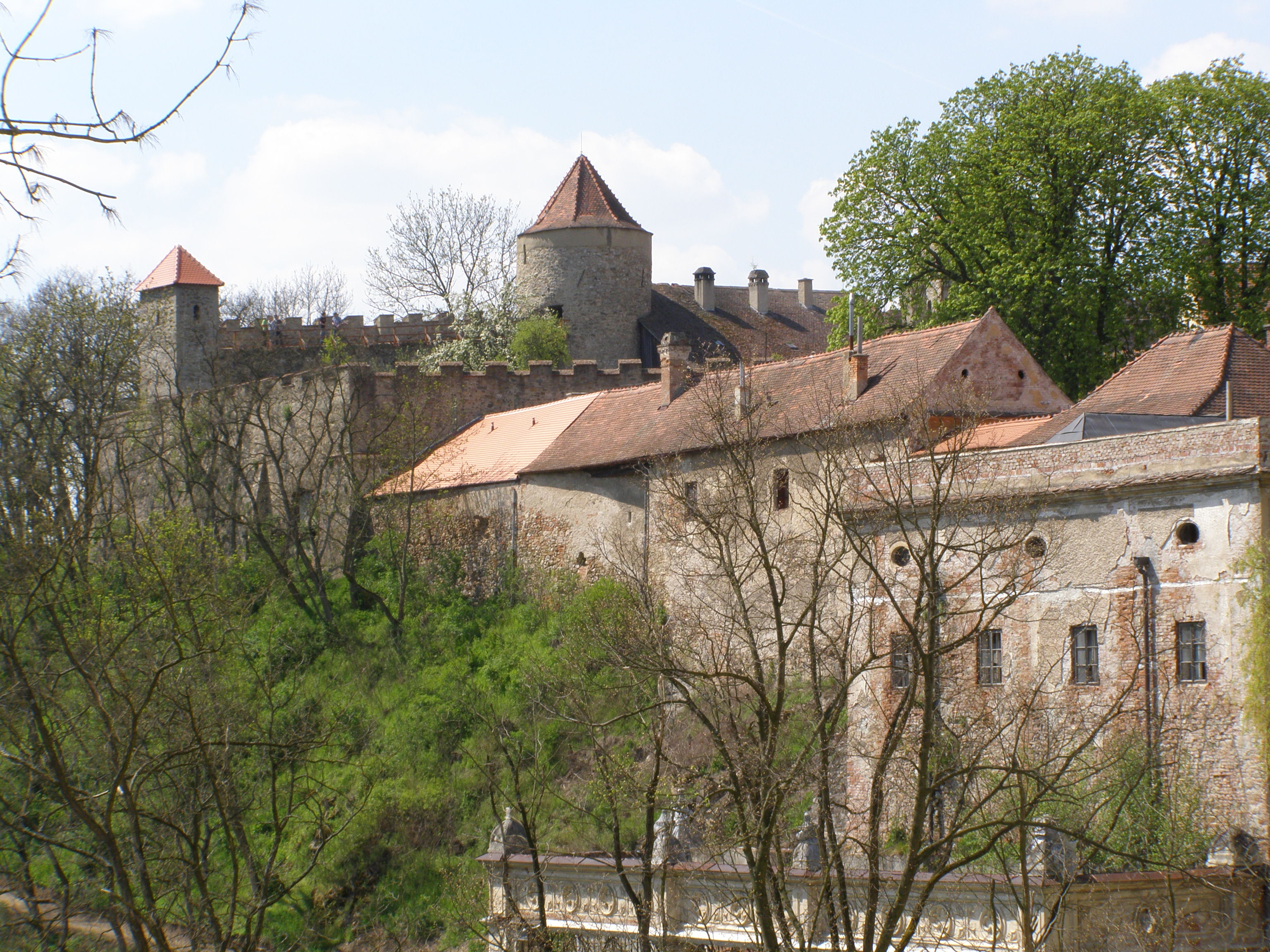
Western part of the castle

During World War II, the castle was occupied by the Wehrmacht (Germans set up barracks), and during this period the area was extensively damaged, including shooting damage to the second floor of the palace. After 1945, a permanent exposition was set up on the site. Although never refurbished to pre-war quality, the castle was still open to the public. In the 1950s, the castle was closed to the public and a school of forestry took over, doing additional damage. Starting in 1972, there was a disastrous project to turn the castle into an international conference center, which fortunately was only partly realized and stopped before more damage to the castle's historical and artistic value could be done. After the political changes in 1989 the castle continued to be neglected.

In 1994, Veveří Castle was again opened to the public, but in 1999, it was abruptly closed and allowed to fall into a state of disrepair during lengthy "property transfers". After several unsuccessful attempts to rent the castle for commercial use, the castle passed in September 1999 from the management of the Ministry of Education under the jurisdiction of the Ministry of Culture and joined the portfolio of historic buildings managed by the National Heritage Institute in Brno. Thanks to the program to protect the architectural heritage of the Ministry of Culture and extraordinary subsidies from the state budget of the city of Brno, the South Moravian Region, and voluntary collections, the worst emergency conditions were stabilized and a number of noteworthy renovations and reconstructions carried out, primarily of the palace. These renovations included a large-scale rebuilding of the "loft" above the palace, and the great dining room with its notable frescoes. Since 2002, the castle is again open to the public, and offers guided tours of the palace. The complete restoration of all buildings, furniture, courtyards and parks will take many years.

== Description ==
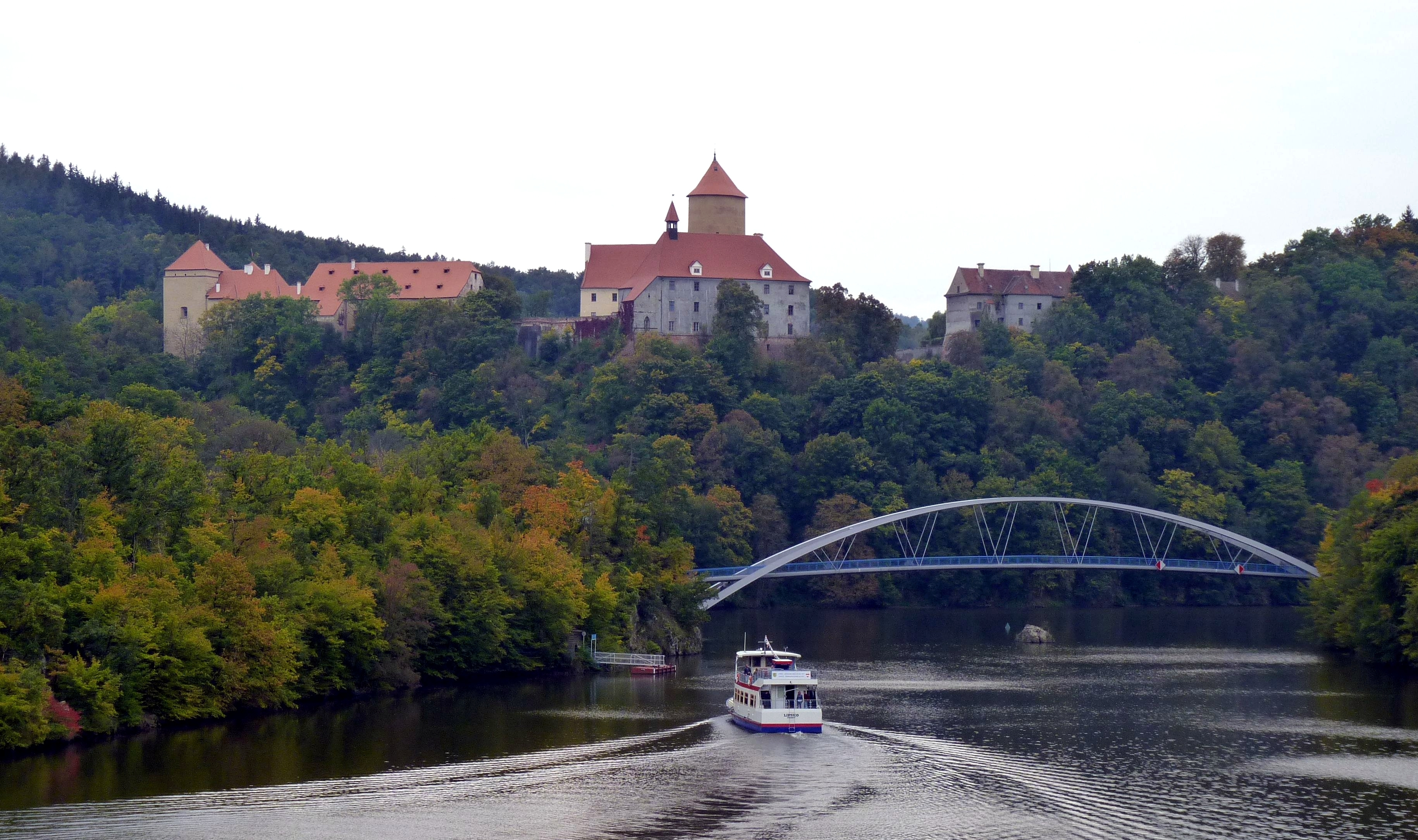
View of the castle and Dam Lake

The castle is usually entered via the so-called Southern Gate. This originally Gothic gate was rebuilt in the late Renaissance style in 1626. Above the portals, there are coats of arms belonging to Zigmund of Tiefenbach and his two wives, Kateřina of Lomnice and Bohunka of Zierotin.

Leading from the Southern Gate to the palace is the castle bridge, mentioned as one of the first ferro-concrete structures in the former Austro-Hungarian Empire. It was built on the site of a gothic drawbridge and later a Baroque bridge decorated with the statues of four saints in 1896.

From the bridge one proceeds through a passage through the palace with keep. On the left is the so-called Black Kitchen, recently restored, where several ovens and a dish-washing basin have been preserved. The keep around which the palace is built is the tallest and oldest of the ten currently visible towers of Veveří Castle, built in the early 13th century as the primary defense element of the oldest building stage of the castle. The palace is the main residential castle building, created by connecting the keep and two medieval palaces.

The former Gothic chapel of St. Procopius in the palace, which originally extended vertically from the ground floor to the second, was replaced in the late 19th century with separate spaces on the ground floor and a library and administrative spaces on the second floor. A preliminary plan has been developed for the reconstruction of the chapel.

Beyond the palace one proceeds through a courtyard, which was created in the early 19th century by pulling down two 13th-century royal palaces. Luckily, records remain of the appearance of these palaces. Beyond the courtyard lies the so-called English Wing, constructed in the second half of the 17th century in the corridor between the Gothic calls. The ground floor served to park horse carriages, while the first floor was used as an armory and later as a granary. The building stands in need of extensive and costly renovation. Yet further along is found the so-called Backyard Palace, erected in the 17th century with two vaulted rooms, one above the other. The renovation plans call for it to be made into a space for cultural events.

At the southeastern corner of the castle stands the so-called Eastern Prismatic Tower, built in the 14th century to protect the castle area from the east. South of this tower archaeological remains have been uncovered of walls of a medieval Eastern Castle Palace, which probably dates from the late 15th century and was pulled down before the mid-17th century.

== Notable people ==
- Vladislaus III, Duke of Bohemia - Duke
- Conrad II, Duke of Bohemia - Duke
- Ottokar II of Bohemia - King
- Blanche of Valois - margraves consort
- Charles IV, Holy Roman Emperor - European monarch
- John Henry, Margrave of Moravia - moravian monarch
- Jobst of Moravia, King of Germany - European and moravian monarch
- Master of Vyšší Brod - medieval painter
- Parler - architect and sculptor
- Gustav IV Adolf of Sweden - King in exile
- Carola of Vasa - Queen of Saxony, (childhood)
- Gustav, Prince of Vasa - crown prince in exile
- Georgios Sinas - banker
- Winston Churchill - politician
- Clementine Churchill

== Gallery ==
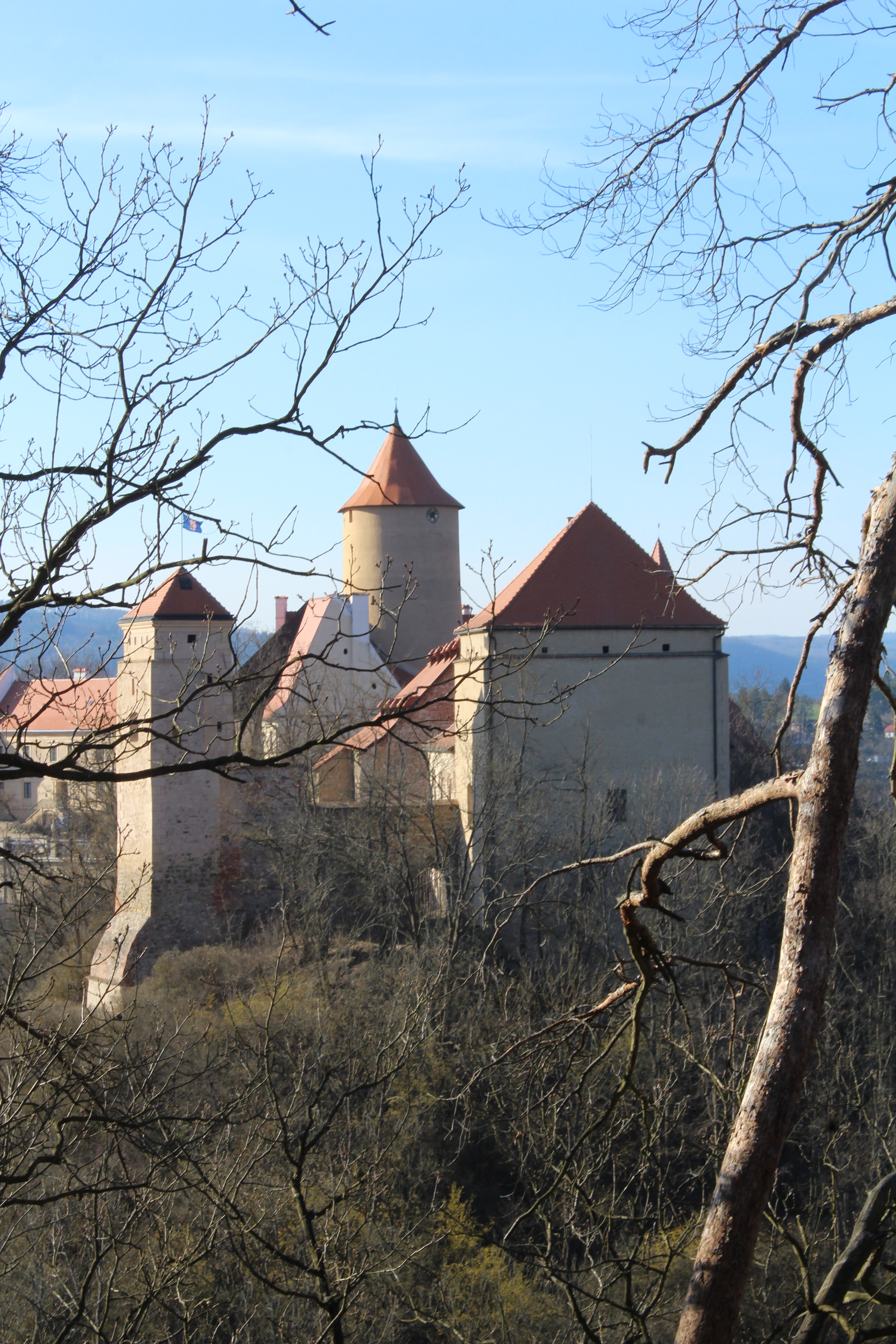
Veveří Castle, eastern part. The oldest donjon, keep and turret

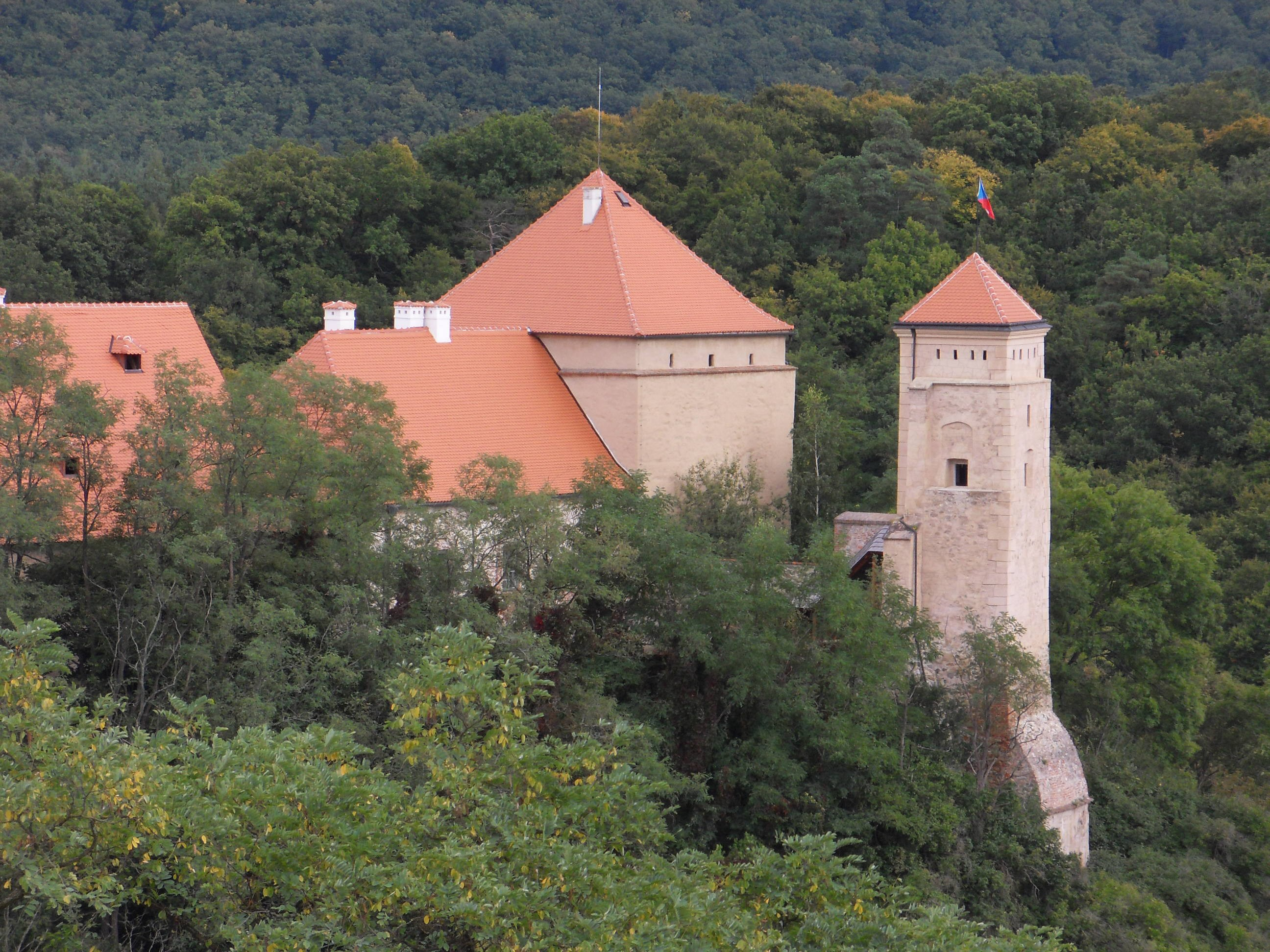
Keep (in oldest part) view from inner space of the Castle

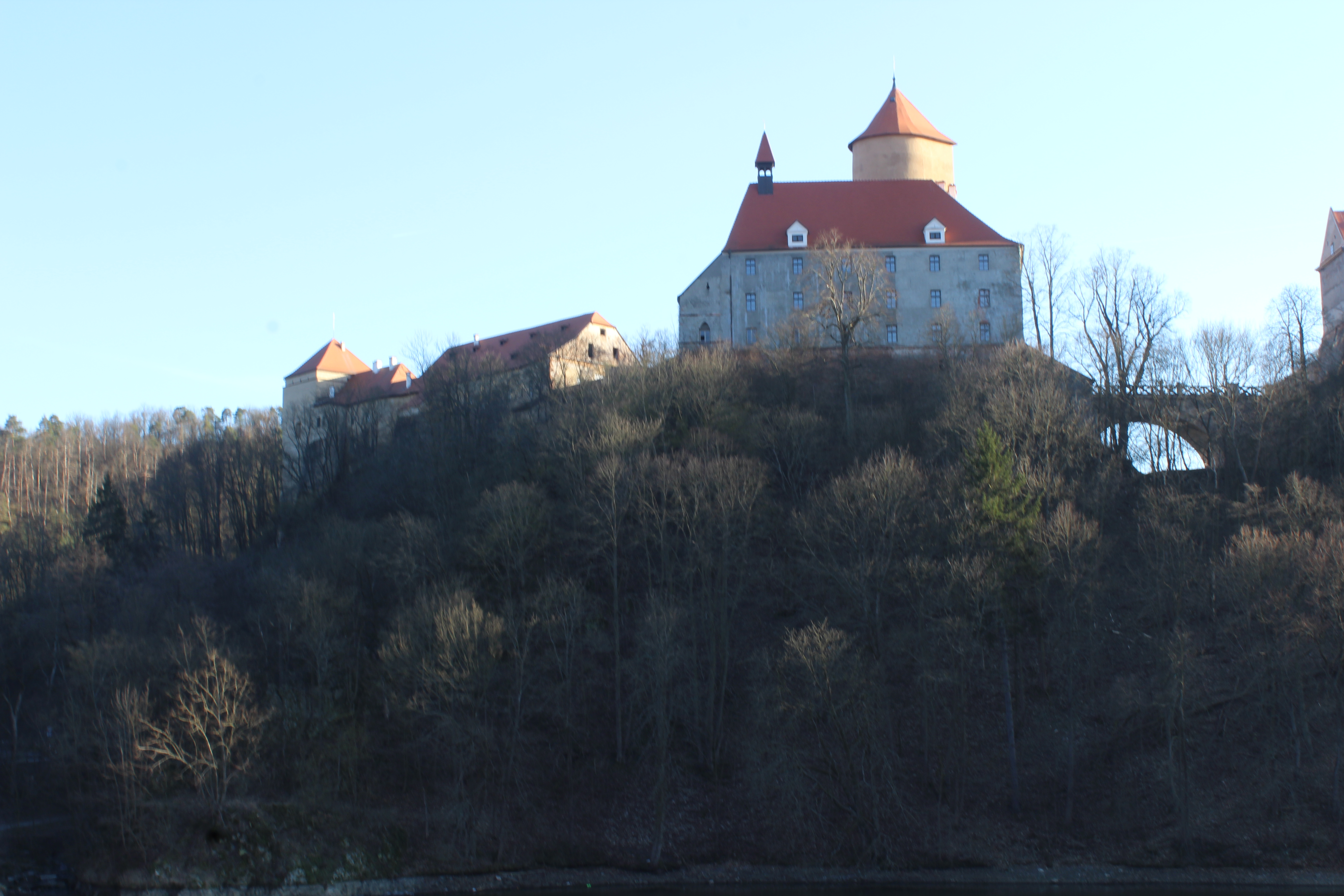
Lower (the oldest) part of the castle, palace around the donjon

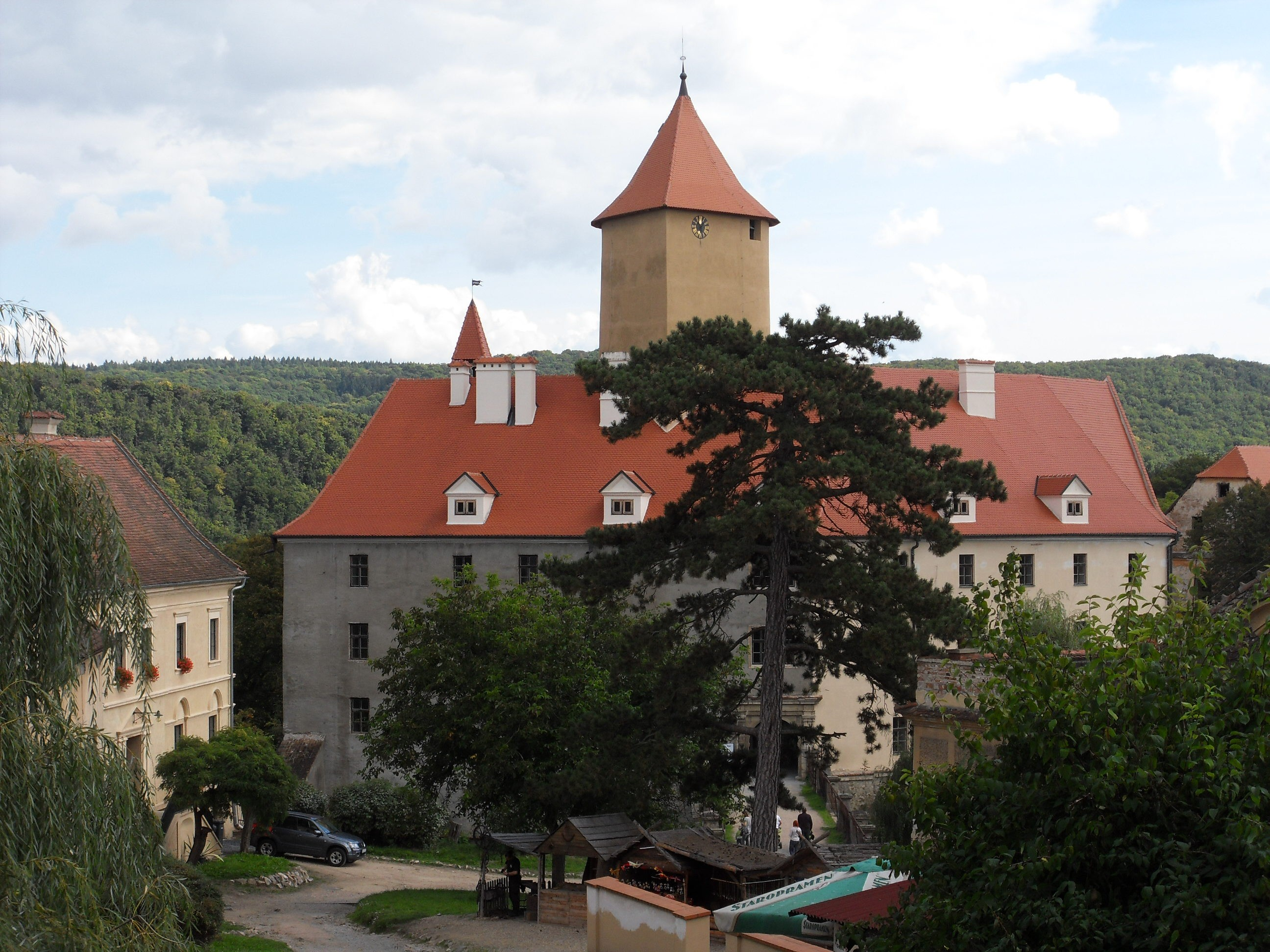
The main palace around the original donjon, view from the ward

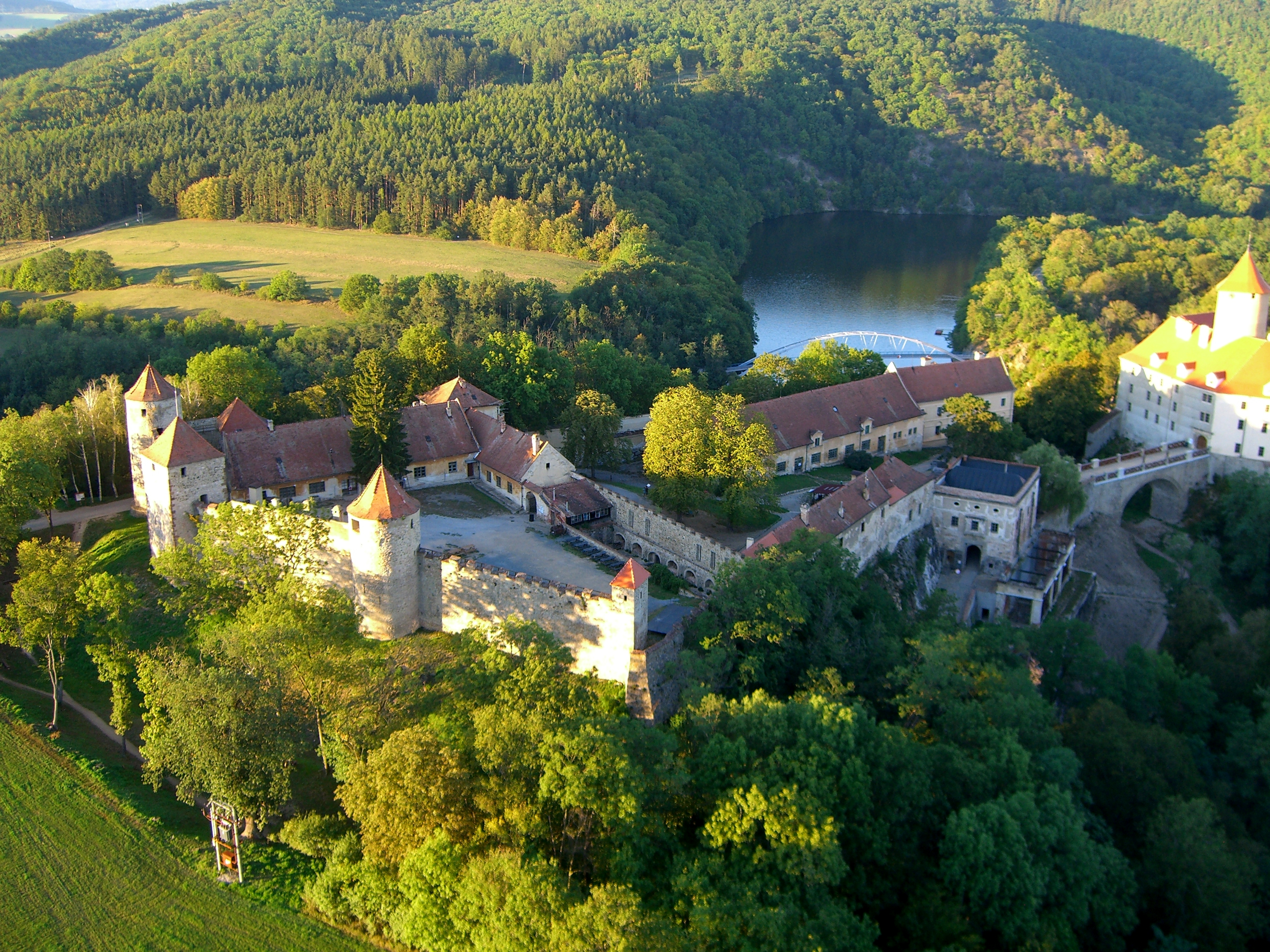
Aerial view from hot air balloon - to the nord

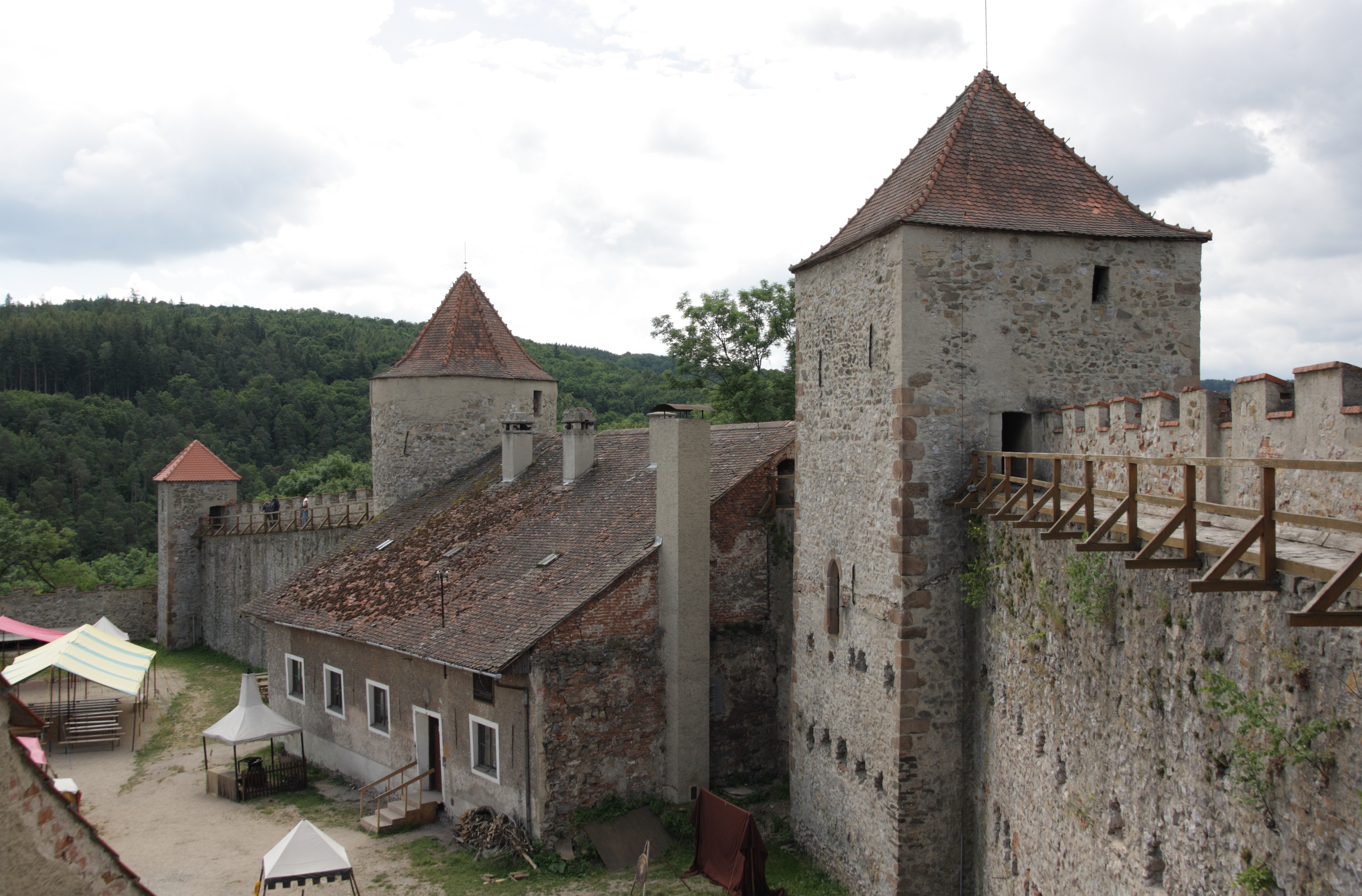
The western enceinte (fortified wall) with horse stable house from inside

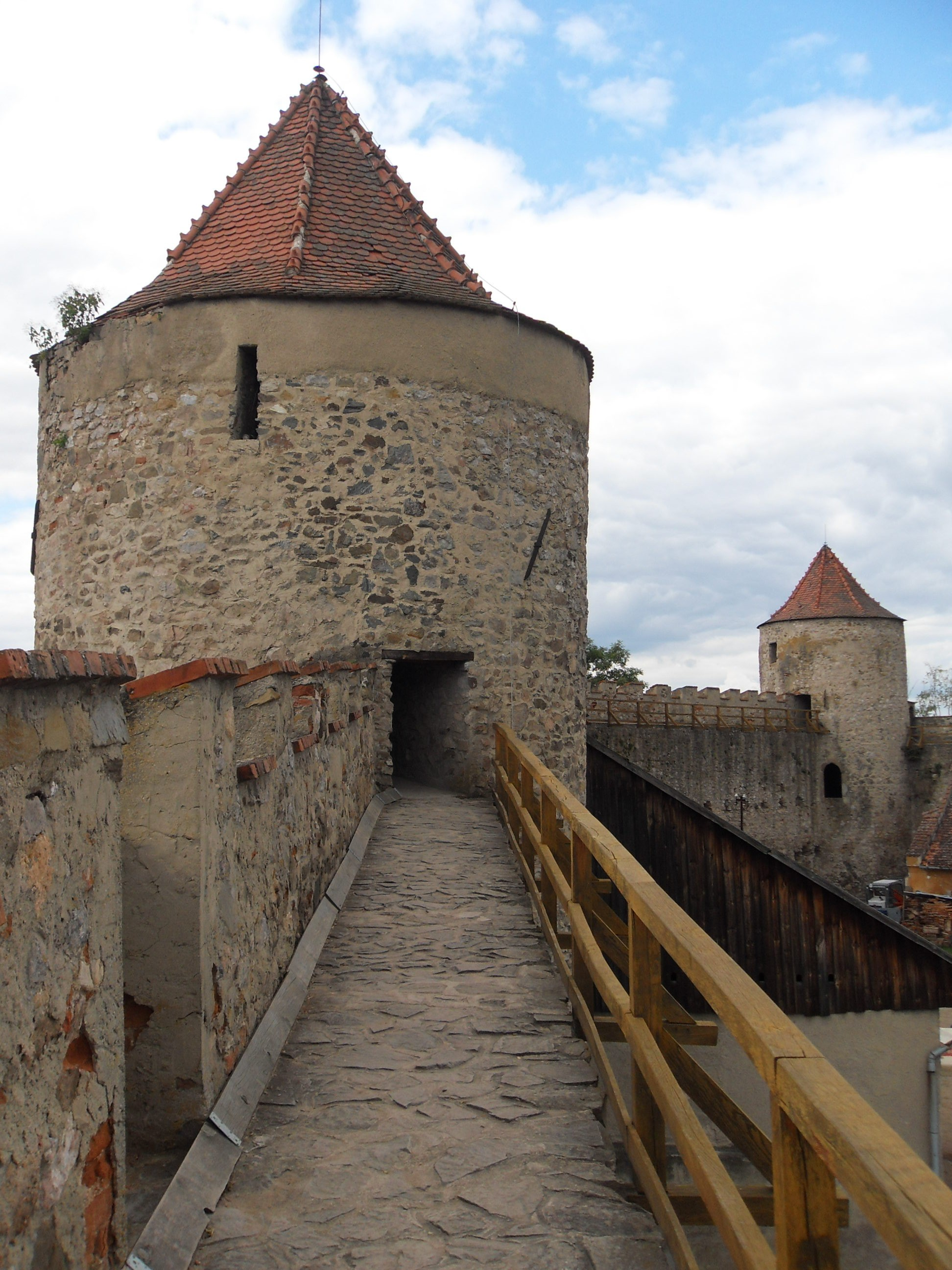
The brattice in western wall

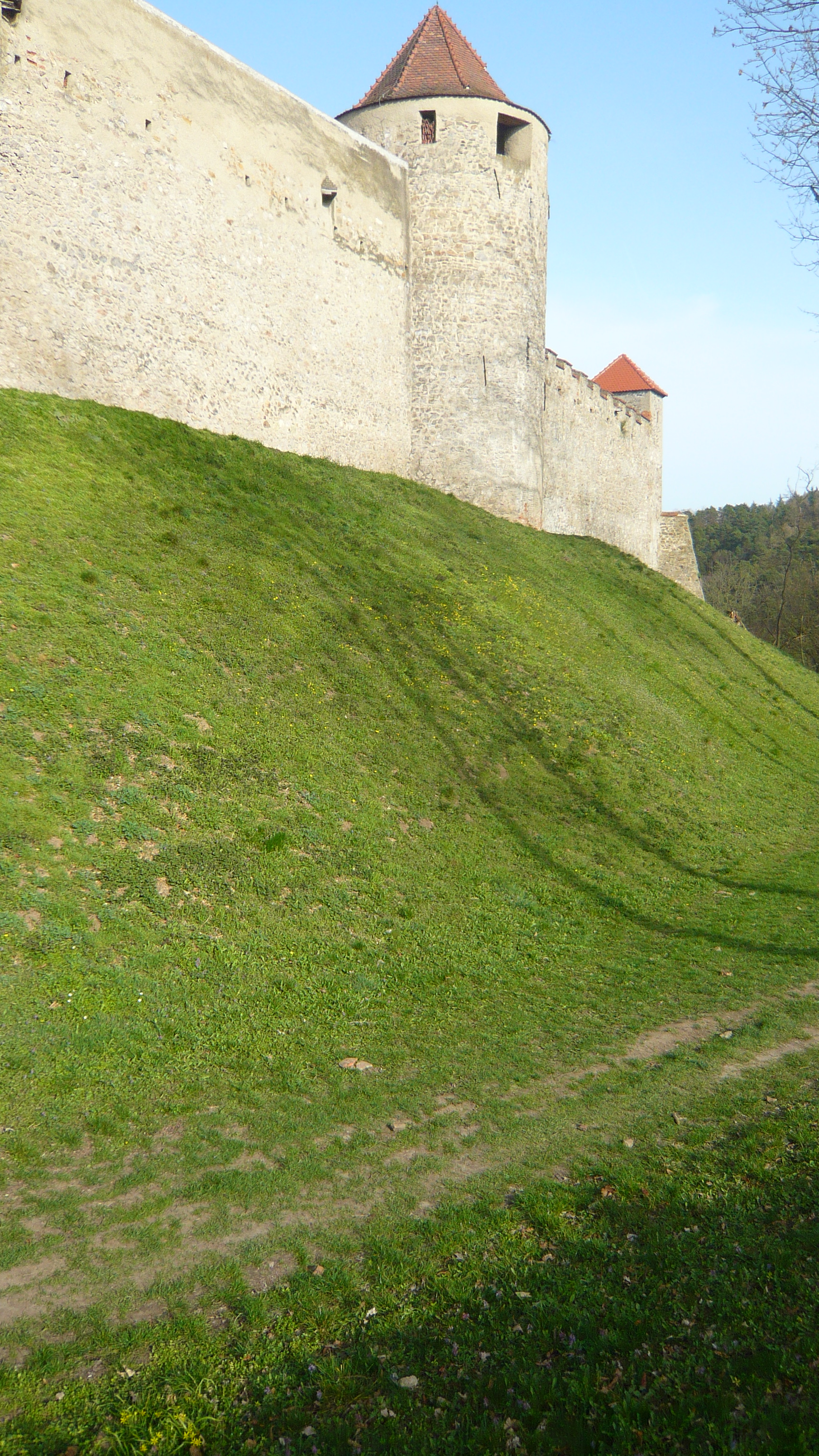
The castle's western wall (enceinte)

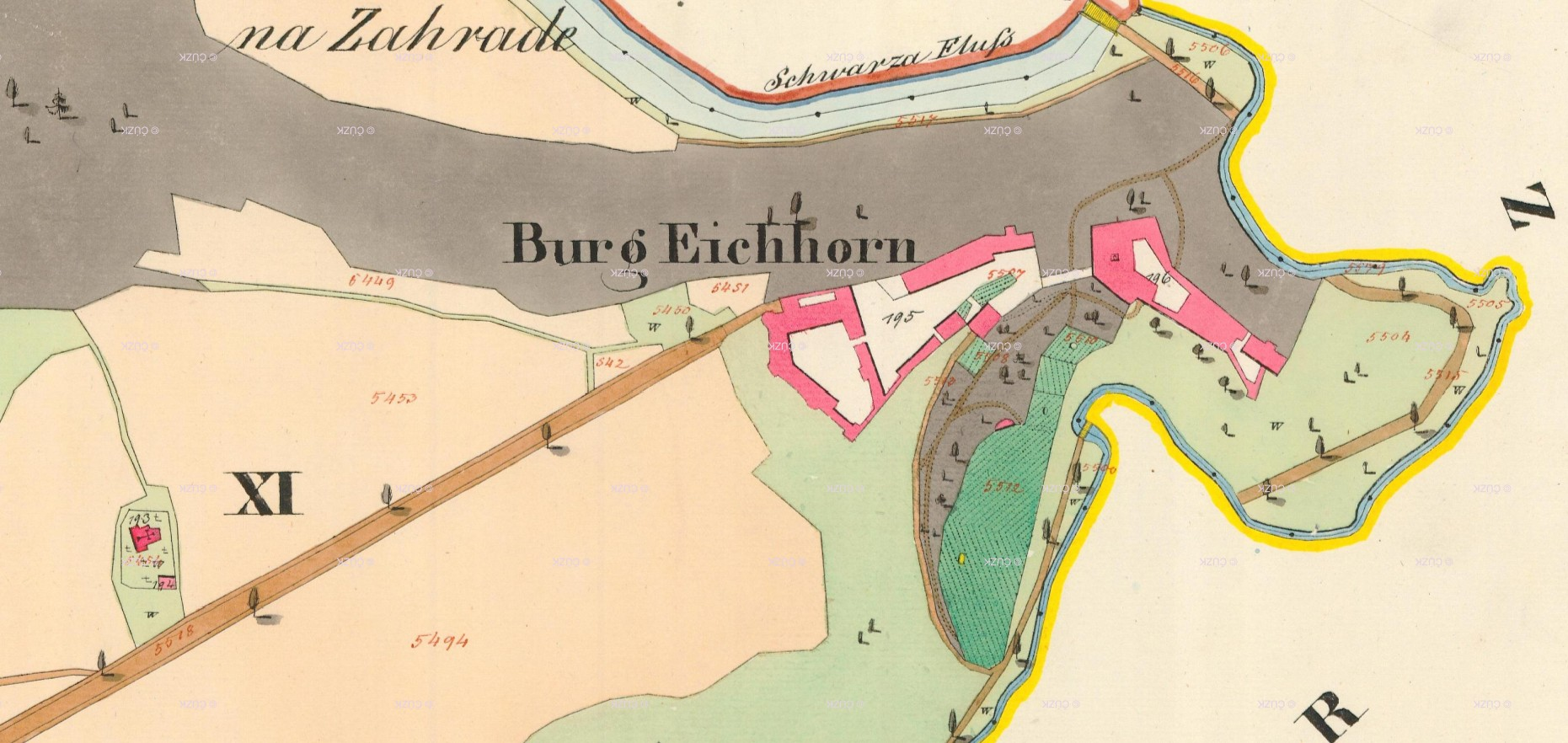
Imperial imprint - the Stabile cadastral map

Drone flight alongside the castle
