= Rose Sommerfield =

- Born: 1874; Baltimore, Maryland, United States
- Died: 1952 (aged 77–78)
- Occupations: Teacher, activist, social worker
- Organizations: National Council of Jewish Women; Young Men's Hebrew Association (Baltimore); Hebrew Sheltering and Immigrant Aid Society
- Known for: Development of the Clara de Hirsch Home for Working Girls; work with the National Council of Jewish Women

Rose Sommerfield (1874–1952) was an American teacher, activist, and social worker. She helped to develop the first home for Jewish working girls in the United States.

== Career ==
=== Teacher ===
Sommerfield taught in the public schools of Baltimore, Maryland from 1889 to 1899. She was actively interested in the First Grade Teachers' Association, helping to shape its policy, and inaugurated the first Mothers' Meetings held in Baltimore public schools. She was interested in Jewish and non-Jewish philanthropic and educational institutions as a volunteer worker. She helped to organize the Daughters of Israel and the Baltimore Section of the Council of Jewish Women, being the first secretary of both organizations. She was also involved in a day nursery, the First Jewish Working Girls Club, and the Maccabeans, an association of men who interested themselves in work among Jewish boys.

She organized a free Sabbath school for Jewish children. She was principal of the elementary school of the Kitchen Garden Association, and also of the evening school for adult immigrants. She served as a director and assisted in organizing the Young Men's Hebrew Association of Baltimore. She gave model lessons in Hebrew at the Summer Assembly Jewish Chautauqua. She was also appointed a critic of lessons given at the first Summer Assembly.

=== Activist ===
Sommerfield was the first treasurer of the Baltimore branch of the National Council of Jewish Women, being inducted into that post at the council's first meeting on May 1, 1894. In 1896 Sommerfield presented her own paper, "Organization of Charities", at the annual convention of the National Council of Jewish Women. She served as chairman of the committee on philanthropy for the National Council of Jewish Women.

In 1899 she went to New York and organized the Clara de Hirsch Home for Working Girls and its trade classes. She was instrumental in the development of the Home, where she served as resident director from 1899 to 1926. She also organized the Clara de Hirsch Home for Immigrant Girls, the Welcome House Settlement, the Model Employment Bureau, and helped to reorganize the Hebrew Sheltering and Immigrant Aid Society and the Virginia, a non-sectarian working girls hotel.

She was on the first committee of the Lakeview Home for Girls, secretary of the Monday Club of New York, vice-president of the Jewish Social Workers of New York, and secretary of the Jewish Social Workers, Section of the National Jewish Conference of Charities. She assisted in organizing the Wage Earner's Theatre League, and she was a member of its executive committee.

== Personal ==
Sommerfield was raised in a middle-class German Jewish family in Baltimore. She never married.

== Selected works ==
- "Truancy in Public Schools" for the Maryland State Conference of Charities.
- "Charity Organization" for first Triennial of Council of Jewish Women, in which Federation of Charities was urged and a school of philanthropy advocated.
- "Homes for Working Girls" for National Conference of Jewish Charities meeting in Philadelphia.
