= Maurice de Forest =

American-born British politician (1879–1968)

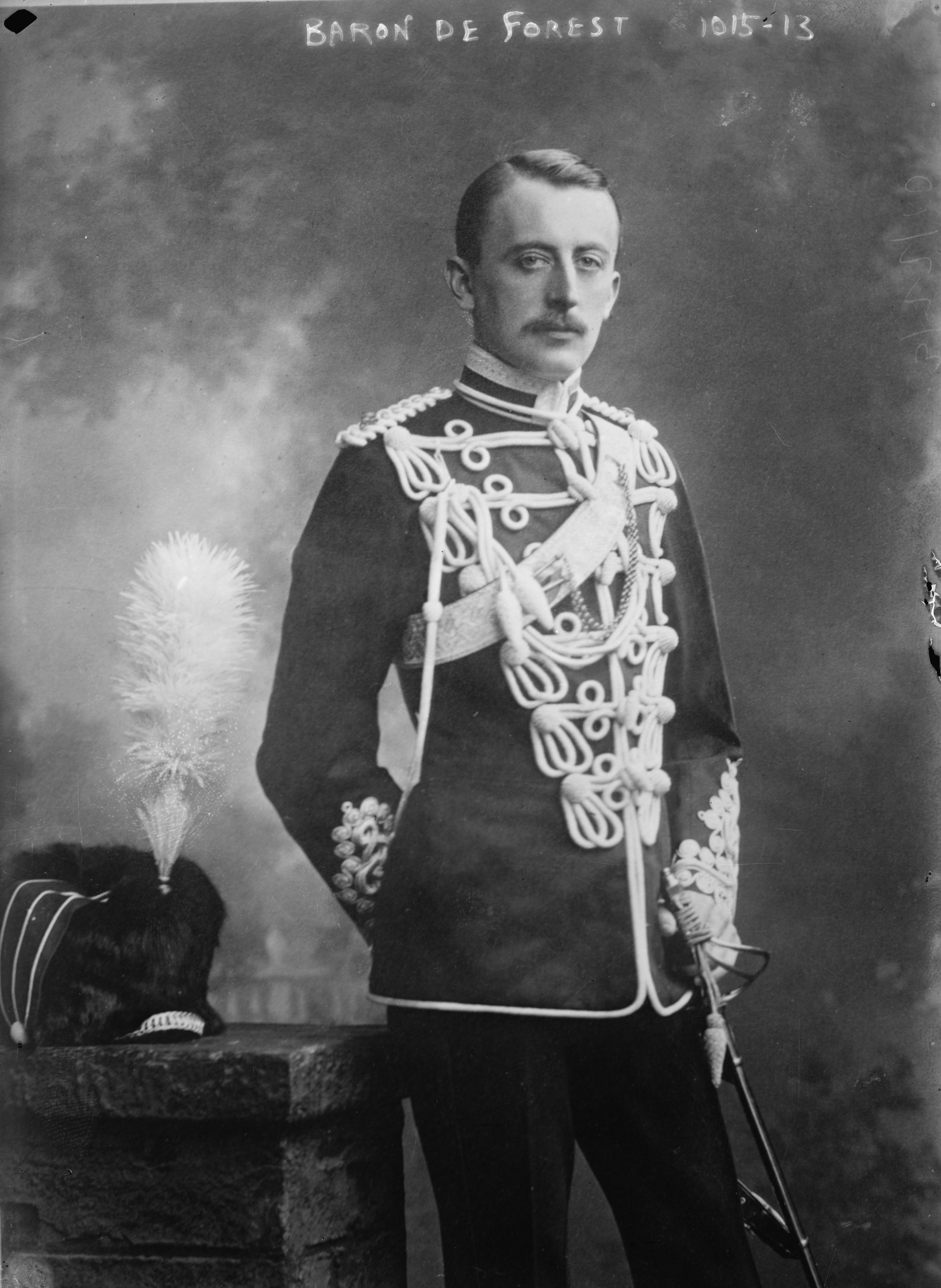
Portrait in 1910

Maurice Arnold de Forest, Count de Bendern (9 January 1879 – 6 October 1968) was an American-born British politician, soldier and early motor racing driver. He briefly served as a Liberal politician in the United Kingdom. He was ennobled, first as a baron in Austria and later as Count de Bendern in Liechtenstein.

== Early life ==
Born in Paris, in the Rue Laugier (in the 17th arrondissement), Maurice Arnold de Forest was reportedly the elder of the two sons of Edward Deforest/de Forest (1848–1882), an American circus performer, and his wife, the former Juliette Arnold (1860–1882). He had a younger brother, Raymond (1880–1912). The boys' parents died in 1882, while on a professional engagement in the Ottoman Empire, of typhoid.

Sent to live in an orphanage, they were adopted on 16 June 1887 by the wealthy Baroness Clara de Hirsch (née Bischoffsheim), wife of banker and philanthropist Baron Maurice de Hirsch, who resided partially near Brno in Moravia, Austria-Hungary (now the Czech Republic) and given the surname de Forest-Bischoffsheim. Baron and Baroness de Hirsch had lost their only surviving child, Baron Lucien de Hirsch (1856–1887), to pneumonia earlier that year. (Note: Lucien de Hirsch had one illegitimate daughter by Irène-Catherine Premelic, named Lucienne Irène Marie Premelic, who became Lucienne Premelic Hirsch (no particule) upon being adopted by her grandparents; she was later adopted by her grand-aunt Hortense Montefiore. Described in 1901 in A.M.F. Monthly as "the world's greatest heiress ... [and] strikingly handsome," Lucienne Premelic Hirsch married a German banker, Edouard Balzer, in 1904.) The de Forest children, however, were identified by Juliette Arnold de Forest as Baron de Hirsch's illegitimate sons.

Baron de Hirsch died in Hungary at the age of 64 in 1896. His widow Clara died three years later, on 1 April 1899. Maurice inherited his adoptive father's residence, Veveří Castle near Brno. Maurice inherited from the Baroness 25 million francs, as well as her estates in Rosice-Veveří. Baron de Hirsch had bought the estates in Rosice in 1881.

Maurice de Forest-Bischoffsheim was educated at Eton College and Christ Church, Oxford. In 1899, he was awarded the title Freiherr von Forest by Emperor Franz Joseph I of Austria. According to the Court Circular, on 6 March 1899, "The Emperor of Austria has given the title of Baron De Forest to M. Arnold [De] Forest and to his brother M. Raymond De Forest, both the adopted sons of Baroness de Hirsch de Gereuth, widow of the late Baron de Hirsch." Both men inherited millions of dollars from Baroness de Hirsch upon her death.

In the following year, he was naturalised as a British citizen, and was authorised to bear the title Baron de Forest by royal licence. He was commissioned into the Militia as a second lieutenant in the Prince of Wales's Own Norfolk Artillery (Eastern Division) on 25 August 1900. He resigned his commission on 20 June 1903, but this was later cancelled and he became second lieutenant in the Staffordshire Imperial Yeomanry (Queen's Own Royal Regiment) on 4 July 1903. He resigned this commission on 5 May 1906, by which time he was also an honorary second lieutenant in the Army.

De Forest converted from Judaism to Roman Catholicism.

Winston Churchill visited de Forest at his Lancashire home, Rosefield Hall, near Southport. Churchill also spent much time on de Forest's yacht and stayed three times (in 1908 together with his wife during their honeymoon journey) at de Forest's Eichhorn Castle.

== Marriages ==
De Forest was married twice, his wives being:

- Mathilde Madeleine Rose Menier, née Letellier, the widow of chocolate magnate Albert Menier and a daughter of Eugène Letellier, a French newspaper publisher. They married in 1901 and had one daughter, Mabel Béatrix Clara Mary Magdalen de Forest (born 5 March 1902). The marriage was declared null and void by a decree of the Pope in 1902.
- Hon. Ethel Gerard, daughter of William Cansfield Gerard, 2nd Baron Gerard, whom he married in 1904 and divorced in 1911. They had two sons, Alaric de Forest (1905–1973) and John de Forest (both later adopted the surname de Bendern). The marriage broke down in January 1910, due to the baroness's adultery with a younger man.

A Swedish man named Ingvar Engström adopted the name Ingvar de Forest late in life and maintained that Maurice de Forest was his biological father. No conclusive evidence exists for the claim. Ingvar was the father of singer Emmelie de Forest.

== Motoring and aviation ==
De Forest was an enthusiast for the emerging technologies of motor cars and aeroplanes. A hobby motor racing driver, he competed in a number of races including the Gordon Bennett Cup in auto racing. From 1903 to 1905 he held the Daily Mail Challenge Cup, having attained a record speed over the flying kilometre at Phoenix Park, Dublin, breaking the world land speed record.

In 1909 he offered the "Baron de Forest Prize" of £2,000 to the first Englishman who could fly across the English Channel in an English-built aeroplane. When a Frenchman, Louis Blériot successfully crossed the Channel in July 1909, he doubled the prize to £4,000. It was eventually won by Thomas Sopwith in December 1910.

He was also a rider of the Cresta Run in St. Moritz where a cup was named after him.

== Politics ==
De Forest was active in the Liberal Party. His political career was largely made possible by his wealth, which enabled him to bypass the usual barriers of local connection or political service and gain entry to Parliament as a well-financed outsider. This made him attractive to the Liberal Party, particularly in contested or working-class constituencies where a candidate's personal resources could fund campaign visibility through pamphlets, events, and travel. At the January 1910 general election he stood as parliamentary candidate at Southport. Despite the support of Churchill, De Forest was defeated by his Conservative opponent, Major Godfrey Dalrymple-White in a campaign marred by racist slurs.

In March 1910 he was elected to the London County Council as a member of the Liberal-backed Progressive Party, representing Kennington. He held the seat until 1913.

In July 1911 a parliamentary by-election was called for the seat of West Ham North, and de Forest was chosen to defend the seat for the Liberals. In his election address he stated that he was in favour of land nationalisation, Irish Home Rule, revised licensing laws, female suffrage and equality of religion in education. He retained the seat for the Liberal Party, with an increased majority.

1911 West Ham North by-election Electorate 16,504
| Party | Candidate | Votes | % | ±% |
|---|---|---|---|---|
| Liberal | Baron Maurice Arnold de Forest | 6,807 | 54.1 | +0.5 |
| Conservative | Ernest Wild | 5,776 | 45.9 | −0.5 |
| Majority | | 1,031 | 8.2 | +1.0 |
| Turnout | | | 76.2 | −3.1 |
| Liberal hold | | Swing | +0.5 | |

He held the seat until the next general election in 1918.

== First World War and aftermath ==
With the outbreak of war with Germany and Austro-Hungary in 1914, attempts were made to prosecute de Forest as an enemy sympathiser. However, with Churchill's assistance, he was able to resist the pressure. He joined the Royal Navy Volunteer Reserve in 1914, subsequently serving in the Royal Naval Air Service Armoured Car Section.

Following the war, a decision was taken that persons authorised to use titles granted by "enemy states" should have this right withdrawn. Accordingly, de Forest was requested to "voluntarily" relinquish his title. He initially refused to do so, but finally relented, and a royal warrant was issued on 16 January 1920 that relinquished "the rights and privileges" granted to him "in consideration of the fact that the said foreign titles of nobility appertain to Countries now or recently at war with Us". He became known as Maurice Arnold de Forest.

The family estates in Moravia were confiscated by the new state of Czechoslovakia for which de Forest was paid £100,000 compensation.

== Later life ==
In 1932, de Forest became a naturalized citizen of Liechtenstein, with Gamprin as his place of origin. In 1934 and 1935, he lent 500,000 Swiss francs each (in total equivalent to 8 million CHF in 2021) to the National Bank of Liechtenstein, which was facing liquidity problems. Following this, he was appointed diplomatic counsellor by Prince Franz I in 1935 and elevated to the rank of Count in 1936, with the title "Graf von Bendern" (Count de Bendern), named after the village of Bendern in the municipality of Gamprin.

De Bendern amassed an art collection including a work by Frans Hals. He maintained a villa at Cap Martin, on the French Riviera, and Château de Beauregard, which contained an animal sanctuary. He died in Biarritz in October 1968, aged 89.

== Relatives ==
His son John Gerard de Forest (de Bendern) was an amateur golfer and won The Amateur Championship in 1932. He married firstly Lady Patricia Sybil Douglas, daughter of Francis Douglas, 11th Marquess of Queensberry. Their children included Simon Frederick de Bendern, Emma Magdalen de Bendern, who married firstly journalist Nigel Dempster, secondly Giles Trentham and thirdly George Galitzine, and Caroline de Bendern, who married firstly saxophonist Barney Wilen.

On 13 May 1968, during the protests in Paris, Caroline de Bendern was photographed by Jean-Pierre Rey sitting on the shoulders of painter Jean-Jacques Lebel waving a North Vietnam flag. The photograph, named La Marianne de Mai 68, was published in Paris Match magazine, causing her grandfather Count de Bendern to disinherit her. As of 2008 she lived in Normandy with her partner jazz musician Jacques Thollot. De Forest's other grandchildren include the political journalist and writer Samantha de Bendern (b.1965).

== Names and titles ==
- Maurice Arnold Deforest, 1879–1887
- Maurice Arnold de Forest-Bischoffsheim, 1887–1899
- Maurice Arnold de Forest-Bischoffsheim, Freiherr von Forest, 1899–1919 (titled in Austria)
- Maurice Arnold de Forest-Bischoffsheim, Baron de Forest, 1900–1920 (authorised in United Kingdom)
- Maurice Arnold de Forest, 1920–1932
- Maurice Arnold de Forest, Count de Bendern 1932–1968 (titled hereditarily in Liechtenstein)

== Notes ==
Parliament of the United Kingdom
| Preceded by Charles Masterman | Member of Parliament for West Ham North; 1911 – 1918 | Constituency abolished |
