= Clara de Hirsch =

Belgian businesswoman and philanthropist (1833–1899)

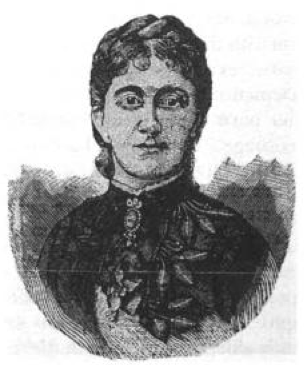
- Portrait, 1882
- Born: Claire Bischoffsheim; June 18, 1833; Antwerp, Belgium
- Died: April 1, 1899 (aged 65); Paris, France
- Spouse: Maurice de Hirsch (m. 1855; died 1896)
- Parent(s): Jonathan-Raphaël Bischoffsheim and Henriette Goldschmidt
- Relatives: Ferdinand-Raphaël Bischoffsheim (brother); Hortense Bischoffsheim (sister)

Baroness Clara de Hirsch (born Claire Bischoffsheim; June 18, 1833 – April 1, 1899) was a Belgian businesswoman and philanthropist who was a member of the Bischoffsheim family and the wife of Baron Maurice de Hirsch.

== Early life and marriage ==
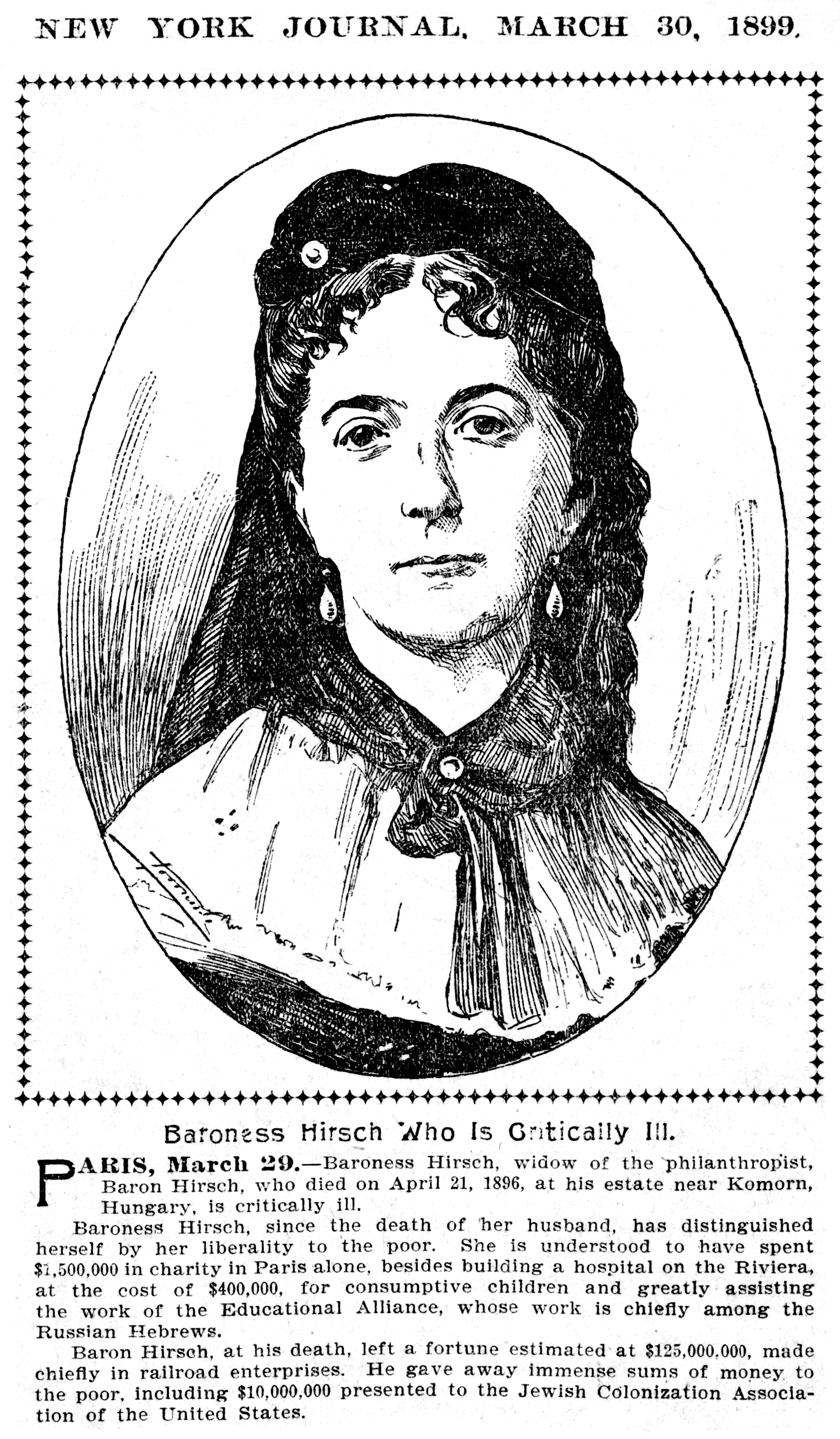
Newspaper article in March 1899 about Clara de Hirsch, written shortly before her death

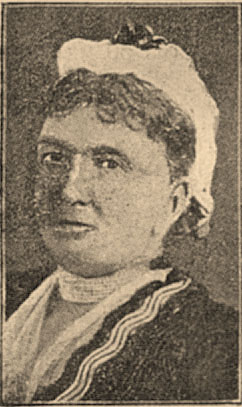
Clara de Hirsch

Born at Antwerp, her father was Jonathan-Raphaël Bischoffsheim. Her mother was Henriette Goldschmidt (1812–1892), a sister of Solomon H. Goldschmidt, who for many years acted in the capacity of president of the Alliance Israélite Universelle.

She received a liberal education and was an accomplished linguist, able to speak and write fluently in French, German, English, and Italian. After leaving school, she acted as her father's secretary and thus became conversant not only with his business affairs, but also with his work as legislator and philanthropist. This proved to be a valuable experience during her husband's lifetime, and particularly so after his death, when she was left as sole administrator of his large estate. She was a ready writer and was her husband's only assistant while he was abroad; and at home, when his secretaries were overtaxed, she often relieved them of long and arduous duties.

She married Baron Maurice de Hirsch in 1855 and lived first in Munich, then in Brussels, and finally in Paris. Two children were born to them, a girl and a boy. The daughter died in infancy and their son Lucien in 1887, at the age of 31. After his death, the baroness never recovered, and she wore mourning apparel for the rest of her life.

Shortly after their son's death, the baron went to Constantinople and the baroness accompanied him. While there, she spent most of her time in the poor districts of the city, and, after careful investigation, distributed more than US$125,000 among needy families, without distinction of their background. Uninfluenced, Baron de Hirsch, cosmopolitan as he was, might have devoted his fortune to totally different purposes, but in philanthropic matters he yielded to his wife's judgment. It was she that gently guided his interests toward philanthropy. She would not permit money, of which the poor, persecuted, and oppressed Jews stood in so much need, to be deflected into alien channels. She determined that her husband should turn his restless energies to relieving the distress of his coreligionists.

== Philanthropy ==
In the work of founding colonies in Argentina and Canada, as an outlet for the persecuted Jews in Russia and the Orient, she was her husband's associate and inspiration. She was thoroughly conversant with all his schemes, so that at his death she was able to continue, develop, and complete, as well as add to, the undertakings begun by him. The strongest evidence of his complete confidence in her is in the fact that he left her sole administrator and residuary legatee of his vast fortune. After his death in 1896, she continued the administrative office in her house in the Champs-Élysées, where she devoted herself to her work from early morning until late at night, surrounded by her secretaries. A year after the baron's death, the baroness sent $1,000,000 to America to help in relieving the congestion in the New York City ghetto. Her plan was to encourage the immigrants to move away from the city into the rural districts, by offering more comfortable dwellings at very low rates.

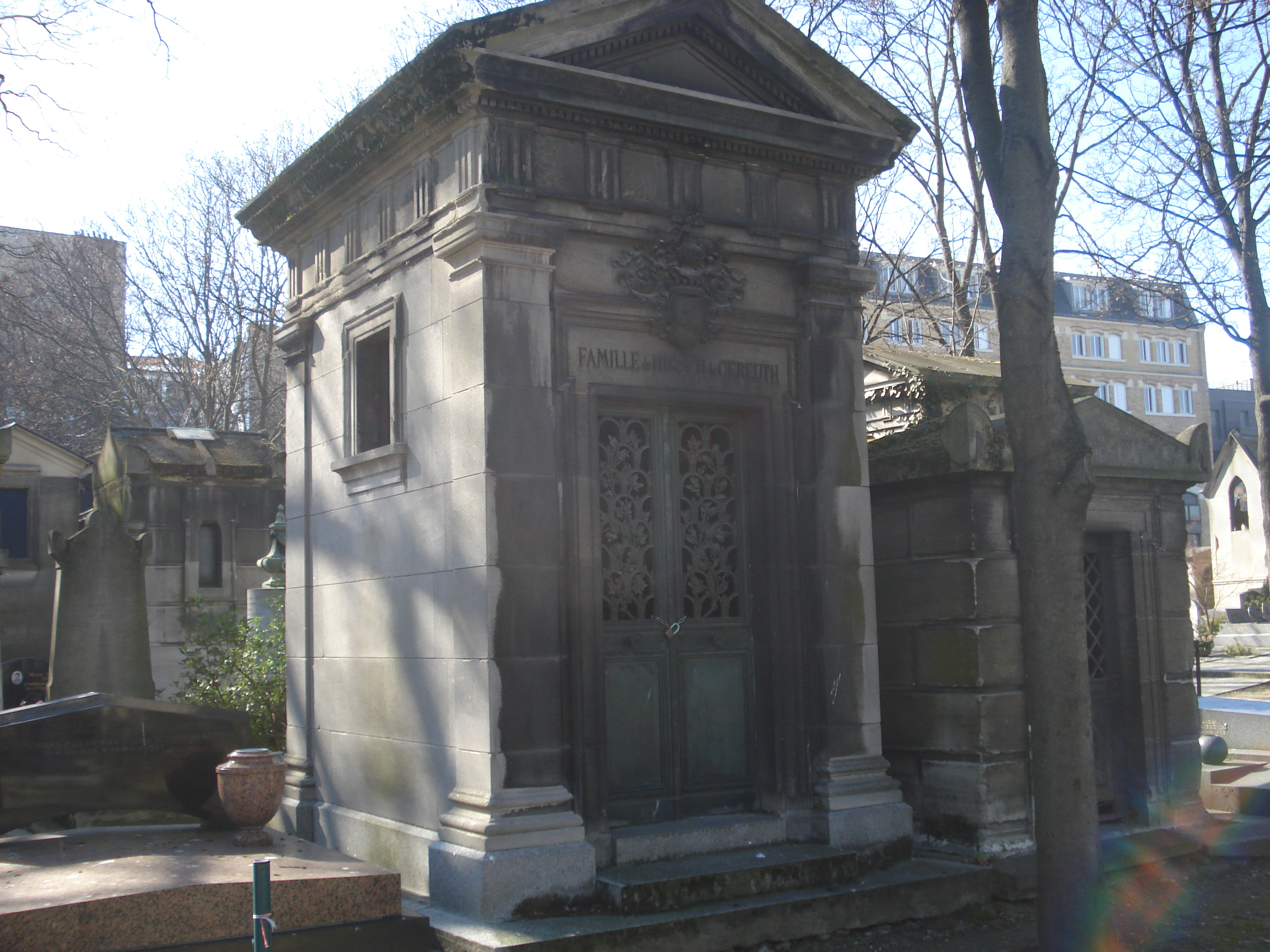
Grave in Montmartre Cemetery.

She also sent $150,000 to erect a building for the Baron de Hirsch Trade School in New York city, thereby enabling that institution to extend its curriculum. She gave $200,000 to build the Clara de Hirsch Home for Working Girls, which she endowed with $600,000 for carrying on its work of providing temporary shelter for homeless working girls, as well as a domestic training school for immigrants. She created a pension fund of $700,000 for the officials of the Oriental railways built by her husband, and a similar pension fund for the instructors of the Baron de Hirsch schools in Galicia. She established benevolent bureaus in Vienna and Budapest, and gave $500,000 each to the Pasteur Institute of Paris and to the Philanthropic Society of Paris. The entire amount devoted by her to benevolent purposes during her widowhood exceeded $15,000,000, and she further endowed her various foundations by leaving them $10,000,000 in her will. It was her intention to give away her entire fortune, with the exception of an income sufficient for her own personal wants and of suitable provision of $4,800,000 for her two adopted sons, Maurice and Raymond de Forest; but she died before she had an opportunity of completing her plan. She died in Paris in 1899.

== Bequests ==
Among the chief bequests in her will were the following:

- Œuvre de nourriture (for providing food and clothing for poor children attending Alliance Israelite schools), $600,000.
- Baron de Hirsch Fund, New York city, $1,200,000.
- Jewish Board of Guardians, London (as a loan fund), $600,000.
- École normale orientale de l'Alliance israélite in Paris, $800,000.
- Pension Fund for Teachers, Their Orphans and Widows, $600,000.
- Baron de Hirsch Institute, Montreal, $1,200,000.
- Baron de Hirsch Foundation for Providing Schools in Galicia, $2,200,000.
- Baroness Clara de Hirsch's Emperor Francis Joseph's Jubilee Foundation (for support of children in Austria), $400,000.
- Clara de Hirsch Home for Working Girls, New York city, $600,000.
- Philanthropic Society of Paris, $200,000.
- Committee of Jewish Charities, Paris, $100,000.
- Minor bequests to individuals and societies, $800,000.
