= Maurice de Hirsch =

German financier and philanthropist (1831–1896)

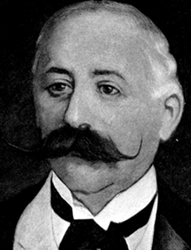
- Born: Moritz von Hirsch auf Gereuth; 9 December 1831; Munich, Bavaria
- Died: 21 April 1896 (aged 64); Ógyalla, Austria-Hungary
- Other name: Baron de Hirsch
- Occupations: Financier and philanthropist
- Known for: Jewish Colonization Association
- Spouse: Clara Bischoffsheim (m. 1855)

Moritz Freiherr von Hirsch auf Gereuth (German: Moritz Freiherr von Hirsch auf Gereuth; French: Maurice, baron de Hirsch de Gereuth; 9 December 1831 – 21 April 1896), commonly known as Maurice de Hirsch, was a German Jewish financier and philanthropist who set up charitable foundations to promote Jewish education and improve the lot of oppressed European Jewry. He was the founder of the Jewish Colonization Association, which sponsored large-scale Jewish immigration to Argentina.

== Biography ==
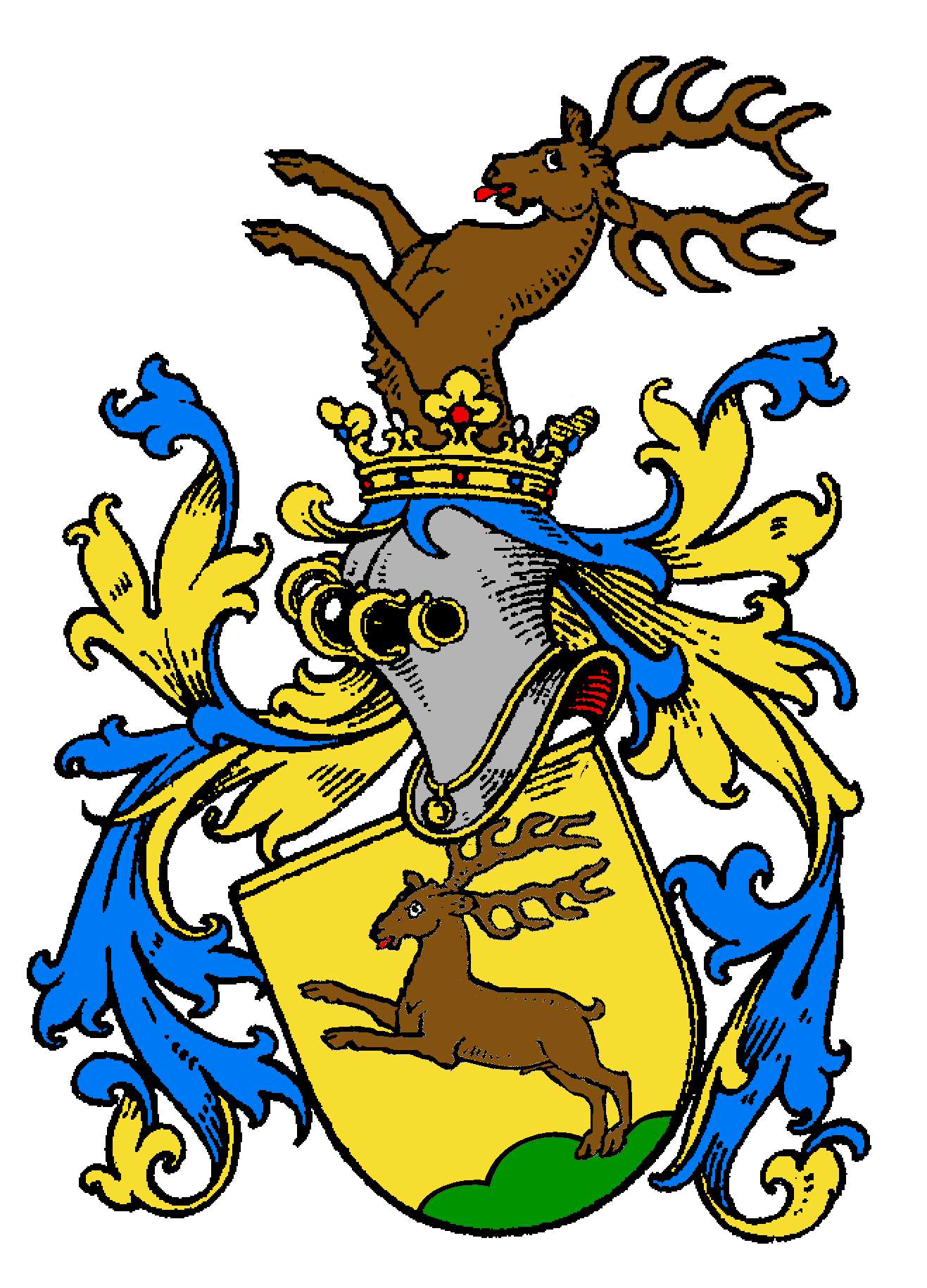
Coat of arms of the Hirsch auf Gereuth family

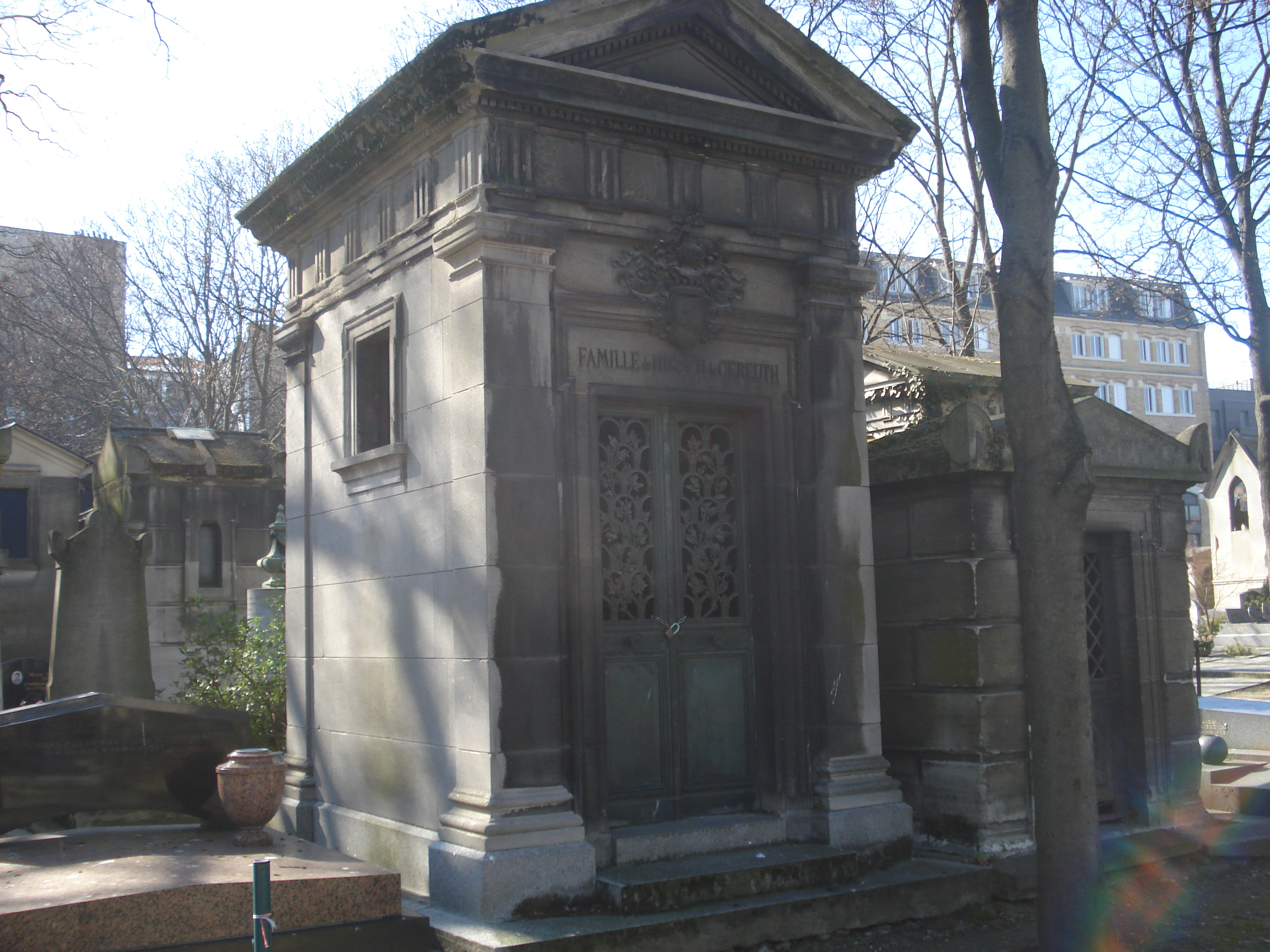
Tomb of Baron de Hirsch at Montmartre Cemetery in Paris

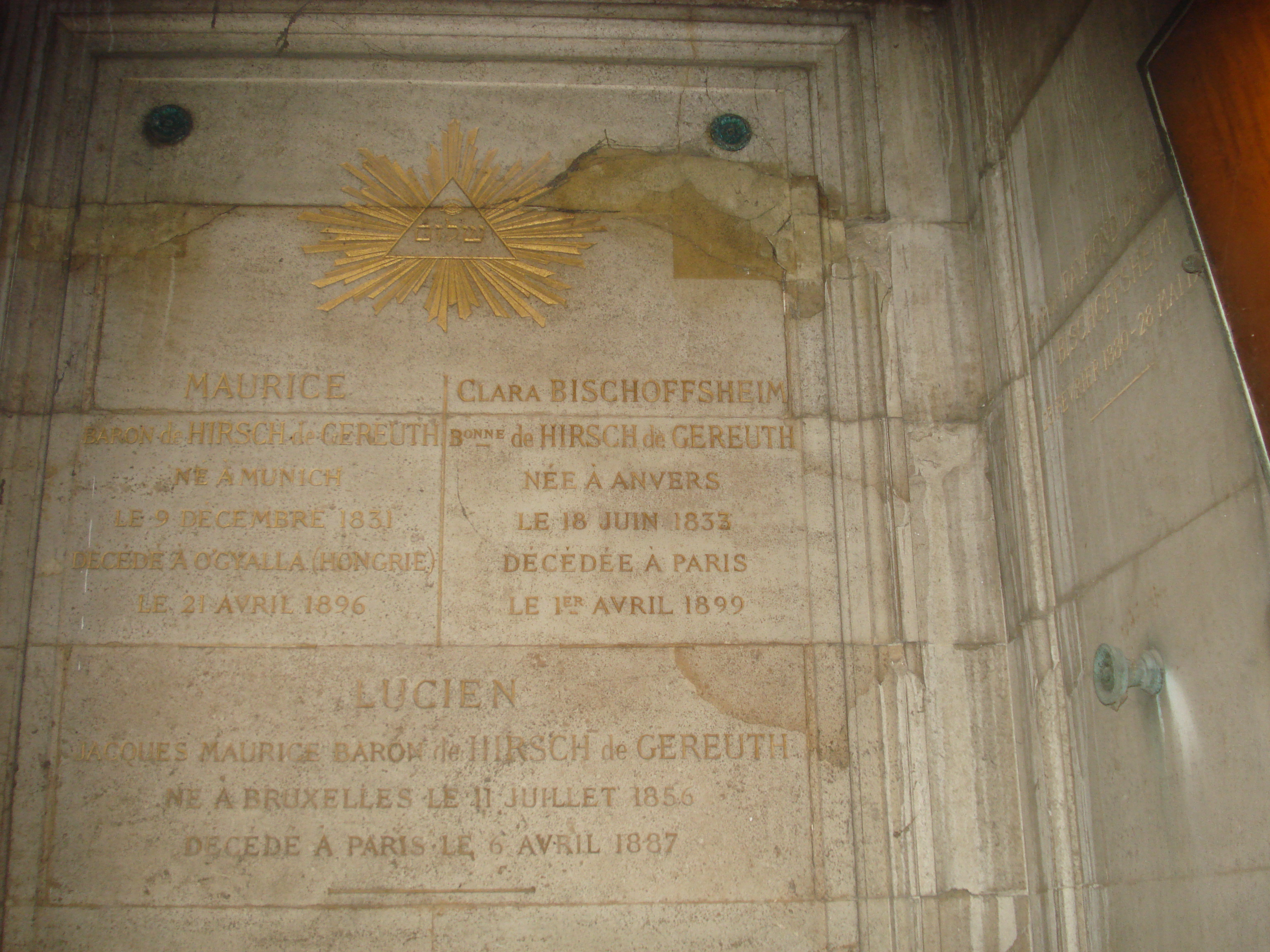
The family's monument

Hirsch was born on 9 December 1831 in Munich, Bavaria. Descended from a family of Jewish court bankers, his parents were Baron Joseph von Hirsch auf Gereuth and Caroline Wertheimer. His grandfather, the first Jewish landowner in Bavaria, was ennobled in 1818 with the appellation auf Gereuth. His father, who was banker to the Bavarian king, was made a Freiherr (baron) in 1869. For generations, the family occupied a prominent position in the German Jewish community. At the age of 13, Hirsch was sent to Brussels for schooling. He then went into business, at the age of 17.

On 28 June 1855, Hirsch married Clara Bischoffsheim, daughter of Jonathan-Raphaël Bischoffsheim of Brussels. They had a daughter who died in infancy and a son, Lucien (1856–1887), who predeceased his parents.

Hirsch died at Ógyalla in Hungary (now Hurbanovo, part of Slovakia) on 21 April 1896. His wife seconded her husband's charitable work with great munificence — their total benefactions have been estimated at £18,000,000. She died in Paris on 1 April 1899, leaving the remaining family assets to her adopted son, Maurice Arnold de Forest (later titled Count of Bendern). Hirsch was amongst the top five richest individuals in Europe at the time.

== Career ==
In 1855, Hirsch became associated with the banking house of Bischoffsheim & Goldschmidt, of Brussels, London and Paris. He amassed a large fortune, which he increased by purchasing and working railway concessions in Austria, Turkey and the Balkans, and by speculations in sugar and copper. In 1869 he bought the concession for railroad building in Turkey from the bankrupt "International Land Credit Company". His best-known railway venture was the Chemins de fer Orientaux, a visionary railway project intended to link Vienna to Istanbul. Hirsch lived in Paris, where he owned a townhouse on rue de l'Elysée and the Château de Beauregard. He also had residences in London, Hungary, and in what is now the Czech Republic (Veveří, Rosice). In 1890 Hirsch bought Bath House, Piccadilly in London.

In 1890 he sold the Ottoman railroads to a consortium that included Deutsche Bank and Wiener Bankverein.

== Philanthropy ==
Hirsch devoted much of his time to schemes for the relief of Jews in lands where they were persecuted and oppressed. He took a deep interest in the educational work of the Alliance Israelite Universelle, and on two occasions presented the society with gifts of a million francs. For some years, he regularly paid the deficits in the accounts of the Alliance, amounting to several thousand pounds a year. In 1889, he capitalized his donations and presented the society with securities producing an annual income of £16,000. Hirsch donated £1000 to The Chelsea and Westminster Hospital in 1892.

On the occasion of the fortieth anniversary of Emperor Francis Joseph's accession to the Austrian throne, he gave £500,000 for the establishment of primary and technical schools in Galicia and the Bukowina. Hirsch donated to charity all the prize money won by his string of racehorses, including more than £35,000 won by his mare La Fleche between 1891 and 1894.

== Jewish resettlement schemes ==
Spanish article about Baron de Hirsch and Jewish colonies in Argentina, Colonia Lapin

The greatest charitable enterprise on which Hirsch embarked was in connection with the persecution of the Jews in Russia. He gave £10,000 to the funds raised for the repatriation of the refugees in 1882, but, feeling that this was a very lame conclusion to the efforts made in western Europe for the relief of the Russian Jews, he offered the Russian government £2,000,000 for the endowment of a system of secular education to be established in the Jewish Pale of Settlement. The Russian government was willing to accept the money but declined to allow any foreigner to be concerned in its control or administration.

Thereupon, Hirsch resolved to devote the money to an emigration and colonization scheme which should afford the persecuted Jews opportunities of establishing themselves in agricultural colonies outside Russia. He founded the Jewish Colonization Association as an English society, with a capital of £2,000,000, and in 1892 he presented to it a further sum of £7,000,000. On the death of his wife in 1899, the capital was increased to £11,000,000, of which £1,250,000 went to the Treasury, after some litigation, in death duties. This enormous fund, which was in its time probably the greatest charitable trust in the world, was managed by delegates of certain Jewish societies, chiefly the Anglo-Jewish Association of London and the Alliance Israelite Universelle of Paris, among whom the shares in the association have been divided.

The association, which was prohibited from working for profit, founded large agricultural colonies in Argentina and North America; after Hirsch's death in 1896, colonies were also founded in Palestine. In addition to its vast agricultural work, it had a gigantic and complex machinery for dealing with the whole problem of Jewish persecution, including emigration and distributing agencies, technical schools, co-operative factories, savings and loan banks, and model dwellings. It also assisted a large number of societies all over the world whose work was connected with the relief and rehabilitation of Jewish refugees.

Besides this great organization, Hirsch founded in 1881 a benevolent trust in the United States for the benefit of Jewish immigrants, which he endowed with £493,000. His local charities were on a princely scale, and during his residence in London, he distributed over £100,000 among the local hospitals.

In 1891, Hirsch established the Baron de Hirsch Fund in New York City to help Russian Jews immigrate to the USA. He provided $2,400,000 for agricultural colonies and trades schools in the USA. Judge Myer S. Isaacs was the fund's president; Jacob Schiff was the Vice President and the trustees included: Oscar S. Strauss, Mayer Sulzberger and William B. Hackenburg. The Fund provided support for agriculture, trade and general subsidies and grants. In 1891, the primary colony called the Woodbine Colony was funded in southern New Jersey. It remained open until the 1940s but suffered due to the settler's lack of farming experience, poor soil and distance from viable markets. In 1893 the Woodbine Agricultural School (1892-1917) was founded to give immigrant students practical experience and financial assistance to purchase their own farms. In 1900 the Jewish Agricultural Society (1900-1972), funded by grants from the Baron de Hirsch Fund and the Jewish Colonization Association, provided loans to immigrant farmers and aided in the mass relocation of immigrants from crowded east coast cities to smaller towns across the USA. The Fund established New York City's Baron de Hirsch Trade School (1895-1935) to teach carpentry, machinery, plumbing, electrical work, and painting. Finally, the Fund provided financial support for several Jewish agencies that focused on immigration aid activities: entry agents, subsidized English classes, scholarships for Jewish students, and a model home experiment.

In 1900, his estate donated funds to the Pasteur Institute in Paris for the construction of their chimie biologique (biochemistry) building.

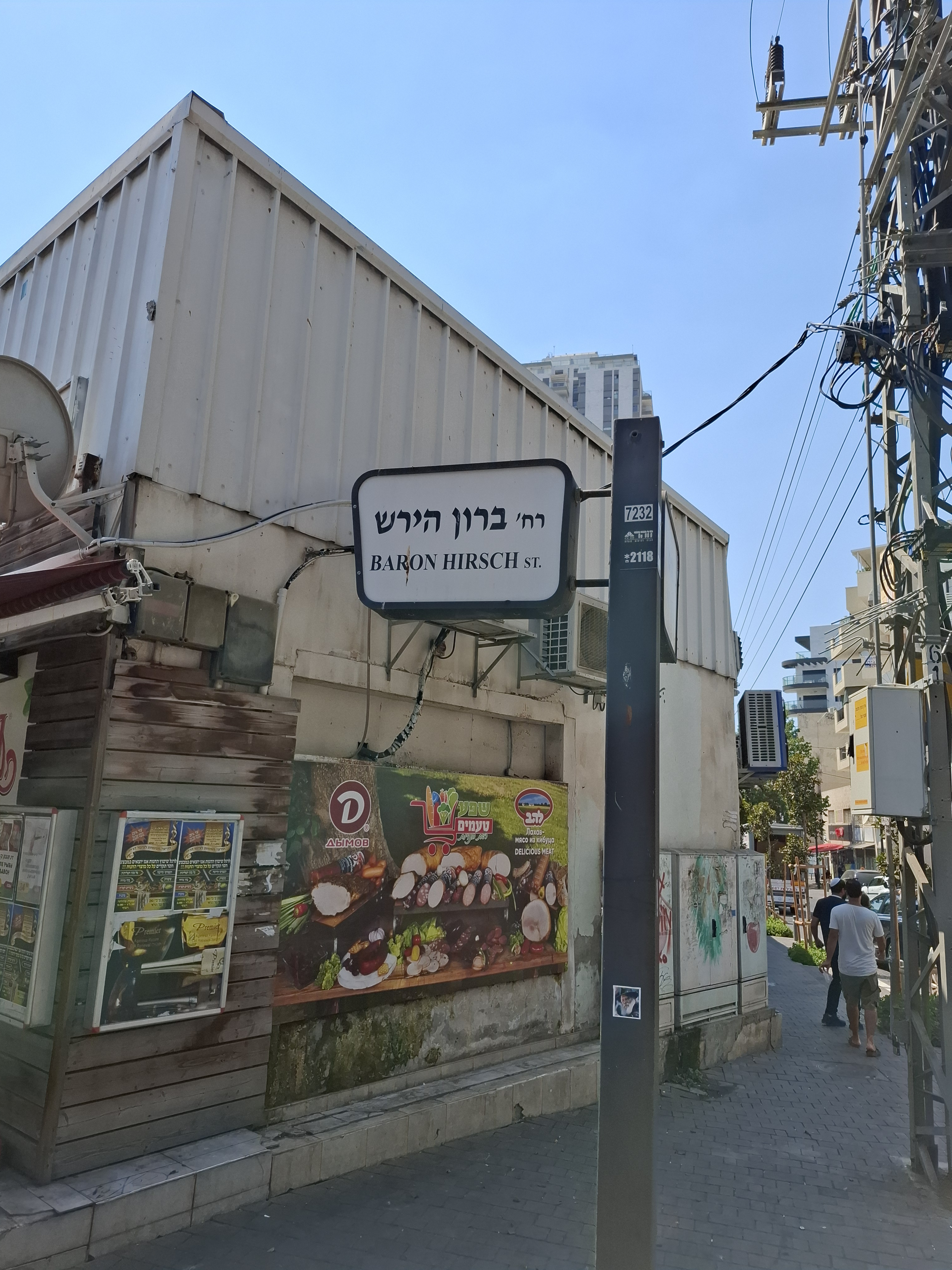
Baron Hirsch Street in Petah Tikva

== Commemoration ==
The Beth Israel Synagogue (Halifax, Nova Scotia) originally was known as the "Baron de Hirsch Benevolent Society". There is also a Baron Hirsch Synagogue in Memphis, Tennessee, and Temple De Hirsch Sinai in Seattle and Bellevue, Washington, Baron de Hirsch Cemetery, Halifax, Baron de Hirsch Cemetery, Montreal and Baron Hirsch Cemetery on Staten Island, New York, are also named for him.

Hirsch is honoured also with naming a commercial stoa, a street and a district at the center of Thessaloniki, Greece.

== See also ==
- Historic Jewish colonies in Argentina
- Jewish Settlement in Canada
- Edmond James de Rothschild (1845–1934), French Jewish banker and major donor of the Zionist project
- Isaac Leib Goldberg (1860–1935), Zionist leader and philanthropist from Russia
