= Clara de Hirsch Home for Working Girls =

Clara de Hirsch Home for Working Girls was a non-sectarian teenage girls' home in New York City, New York, US, located at 225 East 63rd Street. Incorporated in 1897, it was supported by endowment. Clara de Hirsch donated $200,000. Participating girls were between the ages of fourteen and eighteen years. They paid $3.00 to $6.00 a week for board and lodging. The Hirsch Home's mission was improve the girls' mental, moral, and physical condition; and to train them for self-support. It maintained trade classes in hand sewing, machine operating, dressmaking, and millinery. Mrs. Oscar S. Strauss served as president, Carrie Wise was secretary, and Rose Sommerfield, was the resident director. In 1960, the board of directors sold the building and in the following year, the organization merged with the 92nd Street YMHA.

== See also ==
- List of condominiums and housing cooperatives in New York
