= Henri Louis Bischoffsheim =

Dutch banker (1829-1908)

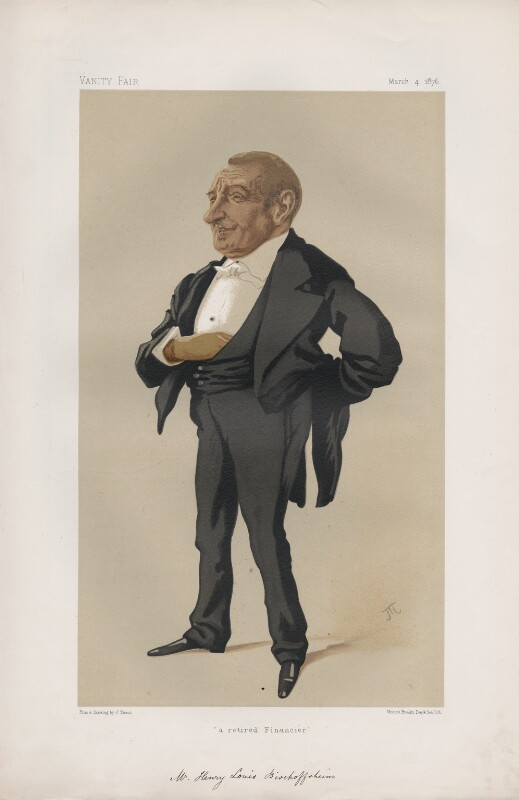
- Born: 17 February 1829; Amsterdam
- Died: 11 March 1908 (aged 79); London
- Occupations: Banker, politician
- Children: Ellen Cuffe, Countess of Desart

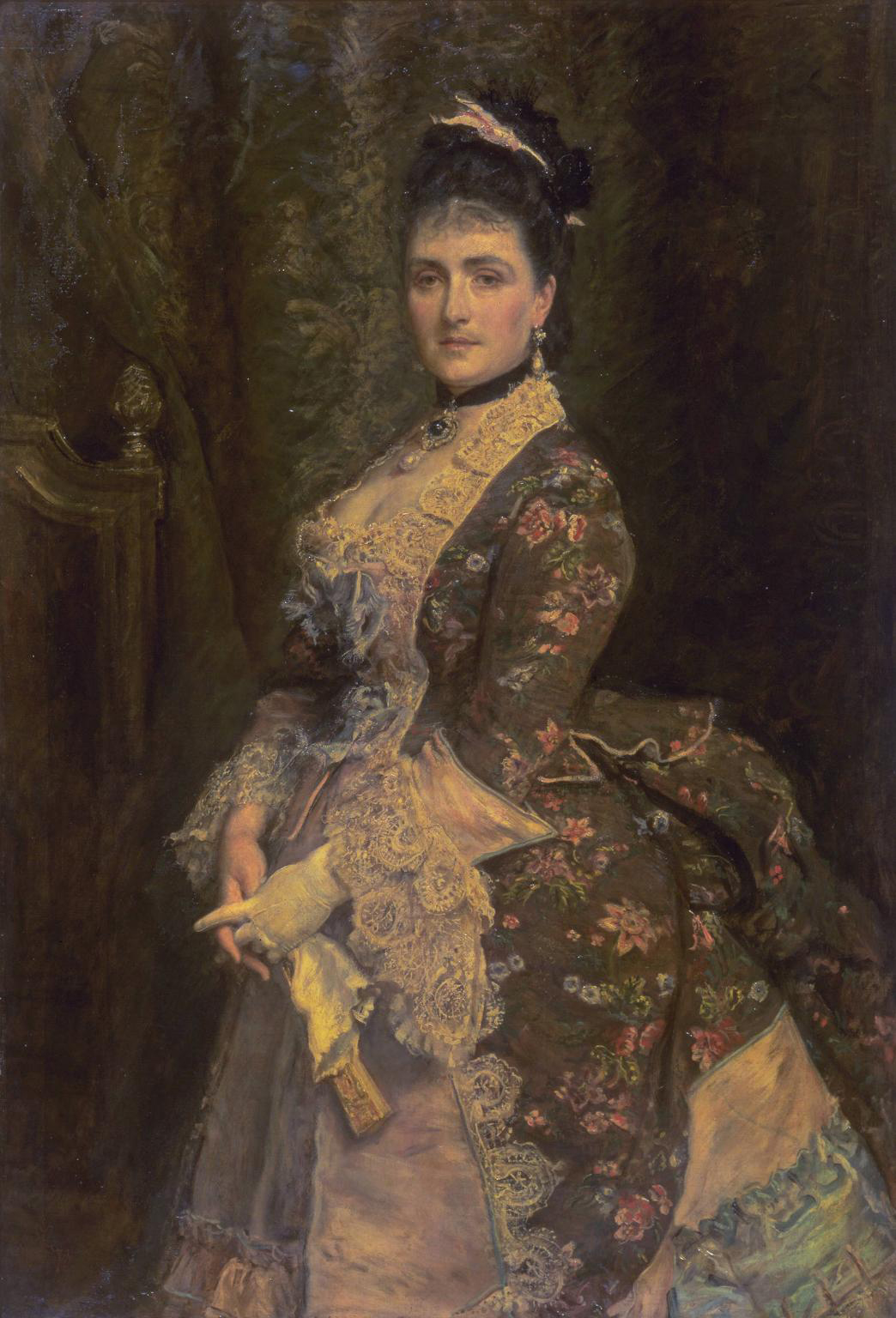
Portrait of his wife Clarissa Bischoffsheim, born Biedermann, by John Everett Millais.

Henri Louis Bischoffsheim (17 February 1829 – 11 March 1908) was a Dutch banker.

He took over Bischoffsheim, Goldschmidt & Cie in London from his father Louis-Raphaël Bischoffsheim.

He founded Deutsche Bank, Paribas, and Société Générale. He died in 1908 in London, leaving an estate of £1,622,332 (equivalent to £208 million in 2023).

== See also ==
- Bischoffsheim family
