= Louis-Raphaël Bischoffsheim =

German-British banker (1800–1873)

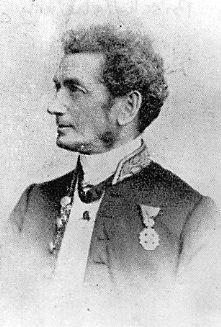
- Louis-Raphaël Bischoffsheim
- Born: 22 June 1800; Mainz, Germany
- Died: 14 November 1873 (aged 73); Paris, France
- Occupations: Banker, politician
- Known for: Bischoffsheim, Goldschmidt & Cie
- Spouse: Amélie Goldschmidt
- Children: Raphaël-Louis Bischoffsheim; Henri Louis Bischoffsheim
- Awards: Order of Leopold (1851); Legion of Honour (1868)

Louis-Raphaël Bischoffsheim (French pronunciation: [lwis ʁafaɛl biʃɔfsɛ̃]; 22 June 1800 – 14 November 1873) was a German international banker and a member of the prominent Bischoffsheim family.

== Early life ==
Louis-Raphaël was born on 22 June 1800 and was the eldest son of Nathan-Raphaël Bischoffsheim (1773–1814), who was considered the founder of the banking dynasty. The father settled in Mainz in 1790, quickly becoming the French army supplier and an important member of the Jewish community there. When he died in 1814, his four children were orphans. Louis-Raphaël, the oldest, was forced to abandon his studies at age 14 and began working for Hayum Salomon Goldschmidt (1772–1843), who owned a bank in Frankfurt. He became friends with his son, Benedict-Hayum Goldschmidt, who was his own age.

== Career ==
In 1820, Louis-Raphaël left Frankfurt and moved to Amsterdam, at the time a major financial center, to create a bank in his name. The following year, he got his brother Jonathan-Raphaël Bischoffsheim to form a financial management company. In 1827, Louis-Raphaël opened a new branch in Antwerp under the management of his brother Jonathan-Raphaël, who left the family bank in 1832, after he married Henriette Goldschmidt, sister of Amélie, to move permanently to Brussels.

After his marriage to Goldschmidt's daughter in 1822, the lives of the two families were even more closely linked, and in 1846, Louis-Raphaël Goldschmidt opened a bank in London, a company that quickly went into the hands of the second son of Louis-Raphaël, Henry-Louis (1823–1908). By that time, his father was already planning to open a new company in Paris (August 30, 1848), the 'Bischoffsheim, Goldschmidt et Cie' , with a capital of 750,000 francs. Members were Louis-Raphaël, Hayum-Salomon (1821–1888), his nephew and son of Benedikt Goldschmidt, and Raphaël-Louis, his firstborn. In 1850, the "Bank Bischoffsheim, Goldschmidt et Cie" officially opened its offices at 26 Rue de la Chaussee d'Antin in Paris. In those years, he met Alphonse Pinard et Eduard Henstch, responsible for the "Comptoir d'escompte de Paris", with whom he worked in the following years.

In 1863, Louis-Raphaël and the members of the Dutch Banque de Crédit et de Dépôt des Pays-Bas absorbed the branches in Amsterdam, Antwerp and Brussels of the bank he created in 1820. In those years, Louis-Raphaël assisted Pinard, Hentsch and Paulin Talabot in the creation of a new bank in Paris, thus becoming one of the founders of the Société Générale. In 1872, he and his nephew Henri Bamberger (1826–1908), as well as Alphonse Pinard and Eduard Henstch, were the architects of the merger of the "Banque de Crédit et Dépôt des Pays-Bas" and the "Banque de Paris", which gave rise to a new Banque de Paris et des Pays Bas.

== Personal life ==
In 1822, Louis-Raphaël married Amélie Goldschmidt (1804–1887), daughter of Hayum-Salomon Goldschmidt, whom he knew from an early age. They had two sons:

- Raphaël-Louis Bischoffsheim (1823-1906)
- Henri Louis Bischoffsheim (1829–1908), banker, who married to Clarissa Biedermann (1837–1922), daughter of Josef Biedermann (1809–1867)

Bischoffsheim died on 14 November 1873, in Paris.

=== Awards ===
He was made a Knight of the Order of Leopold on April 19, 1851, and a Knight of the Legion of Honour on May 30, 1868.

== See also ==
- Bischoffsheim family
- Goldschmidt family
