= Goldschmidt family =

Family of German-Jewish descent

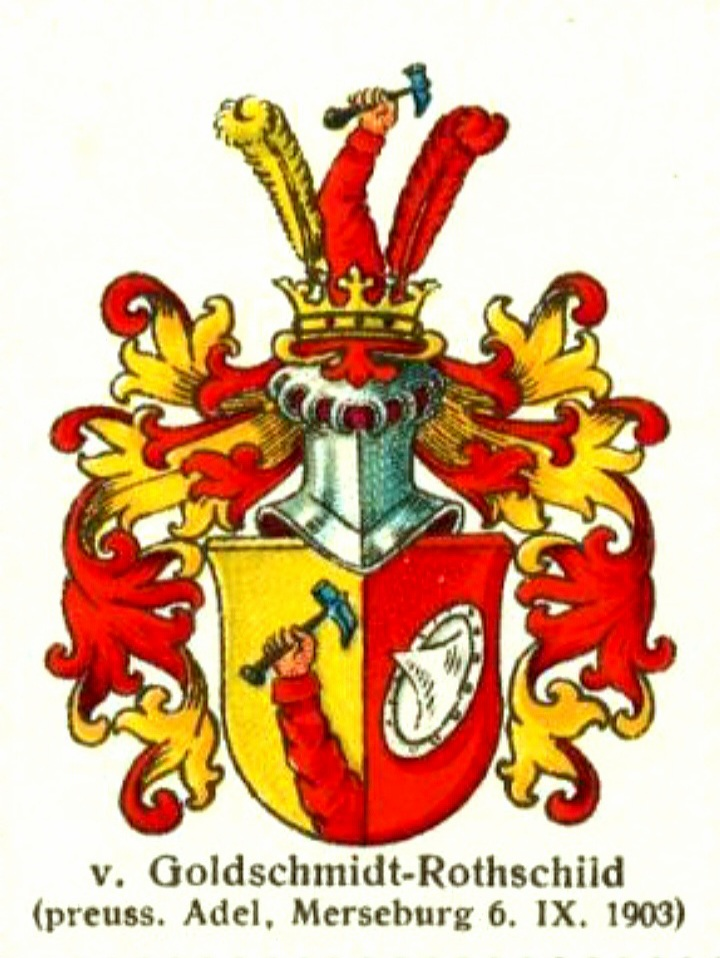
Coat of arms of Barons von Goldschmidt-Rothschild

The Goldschmidt family, Goldsmith or Goldschmidt-Rothschild is a family of German Jewish descent, from Frankfurt am Main, known for its success in banking and finance.

The family is descended from Moses von Schaffhausen, a Jewish goldsmith in Nuremberg in the Holy Roman Empire until a persecution of Jews there in 1499. He moved to Frankfurt, where he took the name of Goldschmidt, and the family went on to prosper as bankers. Most members of the family left Frankfurt after the Fettmilch uprising of 1614, and later generations did not return until the 18th century.

The family was interwoven with the Rothschild family, the Bischoffsheim family of Mainz, and with Bartolome Family, one of the richest families of Monaco. The Bischoffsheim and Goldschmidt families conjointly managed the Bischoffsheim, Goldschmidt & Company Bank, which was eventually merged into Banque de Crédit et de Dépôt des Pays-Bas in 1863, the forerunner to BNP Paribas.

On 6 September 1903, Maximilian Goldschmidt was elevated to the title of Baron von Goldschmidt-Rothschild in Prussia, by Emperor Wilhelm II. Thus, the family became part of the German nobility.

== Family tree (incomplete) ==
- Eden Hayum Goldschmidt (1772–1843), banker
  - Benedikt Hayum Goldschmidt (1798–1873), banker, founder of B.H. Goldschmidt Bank, married to Jeannette Kann (1802–1848)
    - Leopold Benedict Goldschmidt (1830–1904), banker, married to Regine Bischoffsheim (1834–1905)
    - Adolphe Goldschmidt (1838–1918), banker, married to Alice Emma Moses (1844–1922)
      - Frank Goldsmith (1878–1967), politician, married Marcelle Mouiller in 1929
        - Edward Goldsmith (1928–2009), philosopher, environmentalist, married Gillian Marion Pretty and Katherine Victoria James
          - Clio Goldsmith (1957–) former French actress, married 1982–1985 to Carlo Alessandro Puri Negri, and married 1990–2009 to Mark Shand (1951–2014)
          - Dido Goldsmith, married the filmmaker Peter Whitehead (1937–2019)
          - Alexander Goldsmith
          - Benedict Goldsmith
          - Zeno Goldsmith
        - James Goldsmith (1933–1997), investor, married to Doña María Isabel Patiño y Borbón (1936–1954), Ginette Lery (1937–), and Lady Annabel Vane-Tempest-Stewart (1934–2025)
          - Isabel Goldsmith Patiño (1954–), art collector, married Arnaud de Rosnay (1946–1984) in 1973; they divorced in 1975
          - Frank Manes Goldsmith (1959–), football club owner
          - Alix Goldsmith Marcaccini (1964–), hotelier, married Goffredo Marcaccini in July 1991
          - Jemima Goldsmith (1974–), writer, previously married to Imran Khan, a former cricketer and Prime Minister of Pakistan
          - Zac Goldsmith (1975–), politician, married to Alice Miranda Rothschild (1983–), daughter of Amschel Rothschild (1955–1996)
          - Ben Goldsmith (1980–), financier, previously married to Kate Emma Rothschild (1982–), daughter of Amschel Rothschild (1955–1996), and married to Jemima Jones since 2014
          - Charlotte Colbert (1987–), film director and multi-media artist
          - Jethro Goldsmith (1988–)
    - Maximilian Goldschmidt (1843–1940), married to Minna Karoline Freiin von Rothschild, the daughter of Wilhelm Carl von Rothschild (1828–1901)
      - Albert Maximilian von Goldschmidt-Rothschild (1879–1941)
      - Rudolph Maximilian von Goldschmidt-Rothschild (1881–1962), married Betty Lambert (1894–1969), daughter of Léon Lambert (1851–1919) and Zoé Lucie Betty de Rothschild and Marie-Anne von Goldschmidt-Rothschild (1892–1973), the daughter of Fritz von Friedlaender.
      - Lili Jeannette von Goldschmidt-Rothschild (1883–1925), married Philipp Schey de Koromla (1881–1957)
      - Lucy Georgine Leontine von Goldschmidt-Rothschild (1891–1977), married Edgar Spiegl, Edler von Thurnsee
      - Erich Max Benedikt von Goldschmidt-Rothschild (1894–1987), married Countess Veronika Henckel von Donnersmarck (1902–1965)
        - Patrick Maximilien Goldschmidt-Rothschild (1928–1993), married Annika Roman (1928–2008) on 1 July 1967
  - Amalie Goldschmidt (1804–1887), married to Louis-Raphaël Bischoffsheim (1800–1873), banker
    - See Bischoffsheim family
  - Henriette Goldschmidt (1812–1892), married to Jonathan-Raphaël Bischoffsheim (1808–1883), banker
    - See Bischoffsheim family

== See also ==
- Family of Imran Khan

== Bibliography ==
- The Goldschmidts, Anthony Allfrey, 1996 (ISBN 0-9541363-3-0)
