= Jonathan-Raphaël Bischoffsheim =

Belgian banker, businessman and philanthropist (1808–1883)

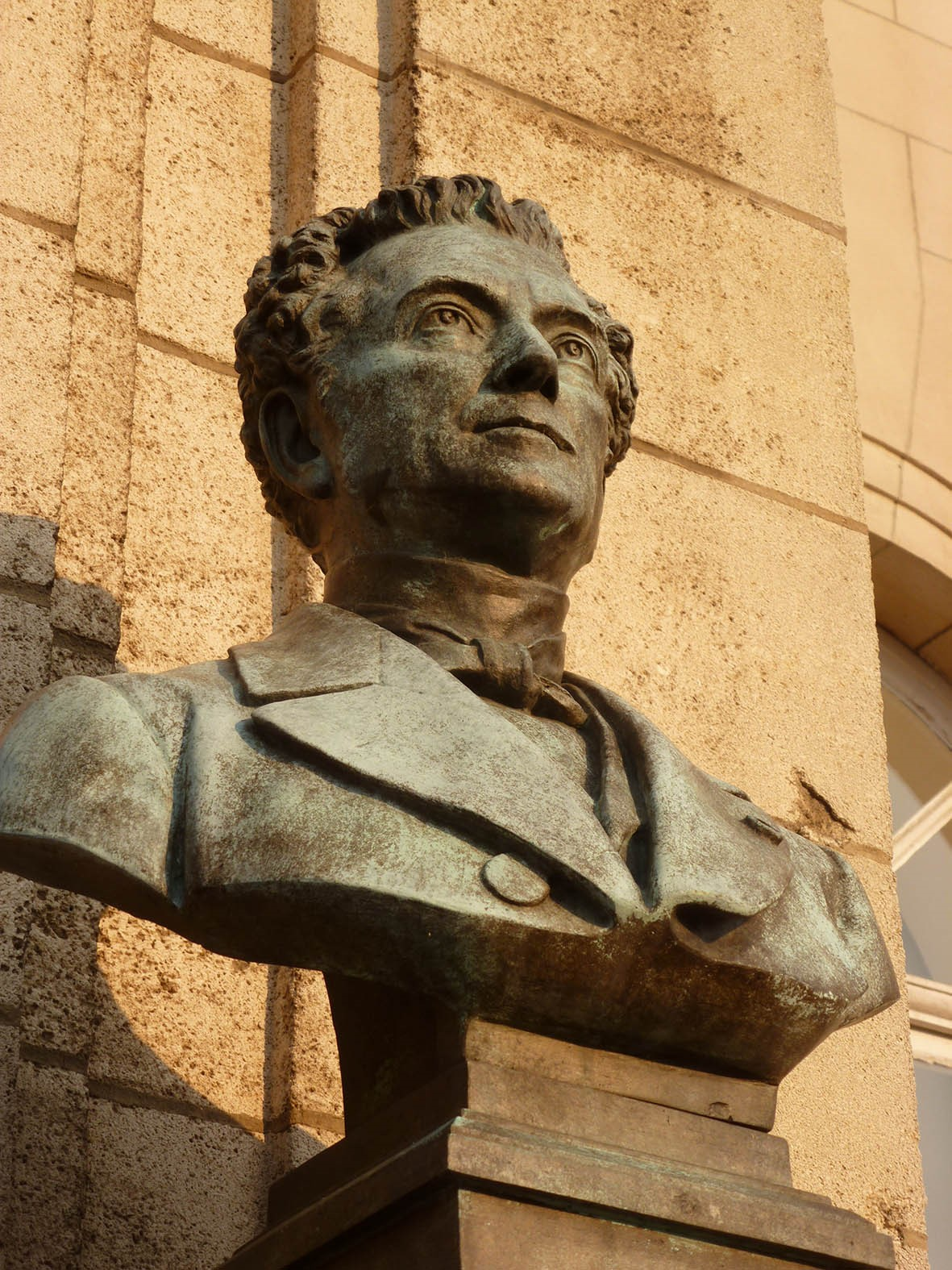

Jonathan-Raphaël Bischoffsheim (26 April 1808 – 5 February 1883) was a Belgian banker, businessman and philanthropist.

== Family ==
He descended from the Bischoffsheim family, which was endowed with an exceptional European network. On 11 June 1832, he married Henriette Goldschmidt (1812–1892) in Brussels, and together they had four children: Claire (1833–1899), Regine (1834–?), Ferdinand Raphaël (1837–1909), and Hortense Henriette (1843–1901).

== Career ==
In 1827, he co-founded the bank of Bischoffsheim & Goldschmidt. He played an important role for the finances and the institutions during the early years of Belgian independence. Bisschoffsheim was a Director of the Banque de Belgique and was one of the founders of the National Bank of Belgium, the regional tramways and managed the Crédit Communal and the Caisse Générale d'Épargne et de Retraite.

Together with his brother Louis-Raphaël Bischoffsheim (1800–1873), he founded the bank which eventually developed into Paribas bank. From 1862 until 1883, he was also a Liberal member of the Belgian Parliament, and as such was influential in the development of the public education network.

== Sources ==
- Youssef Cassis, Capitals of Capital, A History of International Financial Centres, 1780–2005, Université de Genève, ISBN 0-521-84535-1
- The jewish community of Belgium - Jewish figures of note
- From The Restauration To the Third Republic (Origins of Paribas)
- Meeuwissen, Eric. Richesse oblige. La Belle Epoque des Grandes Fortunes. Préface de Jean Stengers, Brussels, Editions Racine, 1999, pp. 315–318.
- The Jewish Encyclopedia
- Cilli Kasper-Holtkotte, Im Westen neues: Migration und ihre Folgen: Deutsche Juden als Pioniere jüdischen Lebens in Belgien, 18./19. Jahrhundert, BRILL, 2003.
