= Ferdinand Bischoffsheim =

Belgian banker and politician (1837-1909)

Ferdinand R. Bischoffsheim
- Born: 2 August 1837; Brussels, Belgium
- Died: 4 November 1909 (aged 72); Paris
- Occupations: Banker, politician

Ferdinand Raphaël Bischoffsheim (2 August 1837 – 4 November 1909) was a Belgian banker and politician.

He joined Bischoffsheim, Goldschmidt & Cie, a bank co-founded by his father, Jonathan-Raphaël Bischoffsheim. It would eventually merge to Banque de Crédit et de Dépôt des Pays-Bas in 1863.

Bischoffsheim also was a member of the Belgian parliament.
