= Ben Goldsmith =

English financier and environmentalist (born 1980)

- Born: Benjamin James Goldsmith; 28 October 1980 (age 46); London, England
- Education: Eton College
- Occupations: Financier and environmentalist
- Spouses: Kate Rothschild (m. 2003; div. 2013) Jemima Jones (m. 2014)
- Children: 8
- Parents: Sir James Goldsmith; Lady Annabel Vane-Tempest-Stewart
- Relatives: See Goldsmith family

Benjamin James Goldsmith (born 28 October 1980) is an English financier and environmentalist. The son of financier James Goldsmith and Lady Annabel Goldsmith, he is founder and CEO of London-listed investment firm Menhaden, which focuses on energy and resource efficiency.

Previously, he co-founded the sustainability themed investment firm WHEB, whose private equity business split away in 2014 and now trades under the name Alpina Partners. He has used his personal wealth to support both philanthropic and political projects in the area of the environment and sustainability.

== Early life ==
Goldsmith was born in London and is the youngest child of the late billionaire James Goldsmith, a member of the prominent Jewish Goldsmith family, and his third wife Lady Annabel Vane-Tempest-Stewart. He has an older sister, Jemima Goldsmith; an older brother, Zac Goldsmith; and several half-siblings. Influenced by his older brother Zac, he has a passion for the environment inherited from their father, who, towards the end of his life, was one of Europe's most prominent founders of green causes, including campaigns against genetically modified food. His uncle Teddy Goldsmith was a co-founder of the Green Party UK and also of The Ecologist.

== Education ==
Goldsmith attended Eton College, an independent English public school, and like his billionaire father, did not attend university.

== Career ==
Goldsmith began his career at private client stockbroker Hargreave-Hale and Co. Ltd., now part of Canaccord Genuity.

In 2003, he co-founded WHEB Asset Management, a sustainability-themed investment management firm. As well as providing venture capital to the European clean technology sector, WHEB established a listed equities fund management business. In 2014, he oversaw the demerger of WHEB's private and listed equity businesses, with the former rebranding Alpina Partners.

In 2015, Goldsmith launched Menhaden Resource Efficiency Plc, a London-listed thematic investment trust focused on the efficient use of energy and resources.

He was described by London's Evening Standard in 2011 as "the quiet force of the Goldsmith family... believed to be a key figure in looking after the family finances."

Goldsmith is a co-founder of upmarket betting firm Fitzdares.

In May 2023, he published his memoir, God Is An Octopus: Loss, Love and A Calling to Nature. The book explored his struggle to comprehend the sudden death of his teenage daughter Iris, and his search for solace, meaning and hope in nature on his Somerset farm.

== Environmental activity ==
In 2003, Goldsmith co-founded the UK Environmental Funders Network (EFN) with Jon Cracknell to federate those interested in funding environmental initiatives. Through JMG Foundation, the family foundation that Goldsmith chairs, he is also directly involved in activist environmental philanthropy. He provided strategic and financial support to Derek Gow.

In 2008, Goldsmith set up The Conservation Collective, a growing global network of local environmental foundations rooted in their communities covering regions from Devon and Tuscany, islands such as Mallorca, Ibiza and Formentera and Lamu and countries including Pakistan and Barbados. By 2022, the group had raised £6.6 million to protect and restore nature.

In 2016, Goldsmith was appointed a trustee of the Children's Investment Fund Foundation, one of the largest environmental foundations in Europe, founded by financier and philanthropist Chris Hohn.

In 2017, he participated in Forces for Nature, a major report released by EFN. The report aimed to encourage more philanthropists to support environmental issues and explores how environmental contributors can be more effective.

In 2018, he was appointed non-executive director at the Department for Environment, Food and Rural Affairs. This proved controversial as he had previously donated cash to Conservative MP Michael Gove's Surrey Heath constituency and the selection process for the job was overseen by Sir Ian Cheshire, who is chairman of Goldsmith's investment firm, Menhaden. Complaints about the appointment included comments that Goldsmith is a member of the "urban elite", and that though interested in the environment he had no experience with environmental issues facing farmers in the United Kingdom.

As a non-executive director of DEFRA, Goldsmith played a leading role in the design and passing of the Agriculture Act 2020. The Act replaces unconditional subsidies for farming, under the EU's Common Agriculture Policy, with a new Environmental Land Management Scheme which rewards farmers directly for the stewardship and restoration of soil and nature.

In 2019, Goldsmith was one of the first funders to support Beaver Trust, a new national charity for beavers. Goldsmith helped to advance government policy to recognise beavers as a native species and give them legal protected status in England in 2022." Working with James Wallace of the Beaver Trust, in 2021 Goldsmith helped instigate a progressive nature restoration programme, a farm payment scheme 'Woodlands for Water' to pay landowners to create thousands of hectares of new woodland buffers along rivers through a partnership between Defra, Forestry Commission and four NGOs, National Trust, Woodland Trust, Rivers Trust and Beaver Trust."

In 2021, he established the Nattergal real estate company with Sir Charles Burrell and Peter Davies. The aim of Nattergal is to acquire agriculturally marginal land on which to facilitate nature recovery at scale using rewilding, based upon the learning of over 20 years at Knepp Wildland, while demonstrating a sustainable financial return. Nattergal's first site is Boothby Lodge Farm, a 605 hectare low grade arable farm in Lincolnshire."

In 2021, Goldsmith persuaded London Mayor Sadiq Khan to establish the Rewilding London taskforce. Upon his appointment as vice chair of the new taskforce, Goldsmith said, "From green rooftops to pocket parks, nest boxes for peregrines and swifts, rewiggling streams and reintroducing long lost native species, our plan is to weave wild nature back through the very fabric of our city."

== Politics ==
Goldsmith has been a funder of the Green Party, including giving £20,000 in 2004 to the UK Green Party and again prior to the 2010 General Election, in which Caroline Lucas became first Member of Parliament from the Green Party. In subsequent years, Goldsmith has also contributed to the UK Conservative Party as well as individual candidates including Conservative MP Michael Gove and the so-called "Notting Hill set of Conservative modernisers".

He is chair of the Conservative Environment Network (CEN), which he co-founded in 2010. The CEN seeks to raise the issue of environmental protection up the agenda of the UK Conservative Party. By 2021, the CEN parliamentary caucus had grown to comprise more than 130 MPs.

At a talk at the UK Centre for Jewish Life in 2013, Goldsmith said that a Zionist is simply someone who believes that the Jews have a right to have their own state in Israel, and therefore described himself as an "ardent Zionist."

In 2016, he campaigned for his brother Zac Goldsmith, who was running for mayor of London.

Goldsmith was a key signatory to a petition sent to Prime Minister Theresa May and Michael Gove urging them to ban all crop spraying and pesticide use in UK rural residential areas.

In January 2026, The Guardian reported that Goldsmith had been approached by Reform UK to construct a new nature policy for the party in collaboration with party leader Nigel Farage and policy adviser James Orr. According to figures in the party, this was in an effort to win over Conservative voters who had been put off of supporting Reform by Farage's stance on the environment.

== Personal life ==
On 20 September 2003, at St Mary's Church in Bury St Edmunds, Goldsmith married heiress Kate Emma Rothschild (b. 1982), the daughter of the late Amschel Rothschild and his wife, Anita Patience Guinness, of the Guinness Brewery family.

The couple were married for nine years and had three children: Iris Annabel (2004–2019), Frank James Amschel (b. 2005) and Isaac Benjamin Victor (b. 2008). On 2 June 2012, it was reported that Rothschild, a music producer, had been having an extramarital affair with rapper Jay Electronica for a year. In the same month, he was arrested for domestic violence against his wife before being released without charge. Goldsmith later announced that he was filing for divorce, citing his wife's adultery. They divorced in April 2013.

Goldsmith married Jemima Jones in 2014. She runs the catering company Tart London and the restaurant Wild by Tart. The couple has five children: Eliza Margot (b. 2016), Arlo Edward Zac (b. 2017), Vita Iris (b. 2020), Vincent Oliver Robin (b. 2022), and Paloma Quentin (b. 2024).

Since 2009, Goldsmith and his family have owned a former dairy farm, Cannwood, in North Brewham, Somerset, which is managed to support nature-friendly farming and rewilding. On 8 July 2019, Goldsmith's 15-year-old daughter, Iris, died in a quad bike accident at the farm. Part of the land at Cannwood is now a memorial stone circle for Iris.

On December 29, 2000, Goldsmith and his family were passengers on British Airways Flight 2069, which was the subject of a failed hijack attempt.

== Ancestry ==
Ancestors of Ben Goldsmith

16. Benedict Hayum Salomon Goldschmidt
8. Adolphe Goldschmidt
17. Jeannette Kann
4. Major Frank Goldsmith
18. Joseph Moses
9. Alice Emma Moses Merton
19. Caroline Königswarter
2. Sir James Goldsmith
20.
10. Pierre Mouiller
21.
5. Marcelle Mouiller
22.
11.
23.
1. Benjamin Goldsmith
24. Charles Vane-Tempest-Stewart, 6th Marquess of Londonderry
12. Charles Vane-Tempest-Stewart, 7th Marquess of Londonderry
25. Lady Theresa Helen Talbot
6. Robin Vane-Tempest-Stewart, 8th Marquess of Londonderry
26. Henry Chaplin, 1st Viscount Chaplin
13. Edith Vane-Tempest-Stewart, Marchioness of Londonderry
27. Lady Florence Sutherland-Leveson-Gower
3. Lady Annabel Vane-Tempest-Stewart
28. Richard Henry Combe
14. Major Boyce Combe
29. Esther Hollway
7. Romaine Combe
30. Sir Henry Tombs
15. Mabel Tombs
31. Georgina Janet Stirling
