= List of people with non-domiciled status in the United Kingdom =

A person with non-domiciled status, sometimes called a 'non-dom', is a person living in the United Kingdom who is considered under British law to be domiciled (i.e. with their permanent home) in another country. Tax status is determined by residence and domicile; nationality is irrelevant. A British citizen who has established a permanent home abroad may reside for a time in Britain and be taxed as non-domiciled.

Non-domiciled status can either be acquired from one's parents, which is known as a 'domicile of origin', or by abandoning one's domicile of origin and demonstrating the intention to reside outside of the UK indefinitely. According to the official government page, "UK residents who have their permanent home ('domicile') outside the UK may not have to pay UK tax on foreign income."

In the 2012/13 tax year more than 113,000 people in the UK claimed non-dom status. The Independent estimated that there were about 116,000 in 2013, an increase of 33,000 since 1997.

The issue of non-doms came to public attention in 2010, and led to the passage of Constitutional Reform and Governance Act 2010, which provided, among other things, that a person not domiciled in the UK could not serve in the House of Lords. Some non-domiciled Lords gave up their seats in order to maintain their tax status.

== Notable "non-doms" ==
Prominent non-doms include:

- Roman Abramovich
- Arpad Busson
- James Caan
- Richard Caring
- Mark Carney, former Governor of the Bank of England
- Sudhir Choudhrie
- Sir Ronald Cohen
- Ben Goldsmith
- Stuart Gulliver, CEO of HSBC
- Jonathan Harmsworth, 4th Viscount Rothermere
- António Horta Osório, CEO of Lloyds Banking Group
- John McFarlane, former Chairman of Barclays
- Lakshmi Mittal
- Akshata Murty, wife of former Prime Minister Rishi Sunak
- Sir Christopher Ondaatje
- Sir Anwar Pervez
- David Potter
- Sigrid Rausing
- Doug Richard
- Pascal Soriot, CEO of AstraZeneca
- Mark Wilson

Those who resigned from the House of Lords over the issue include Raj Bagri, Baron Bagri, Baroness Lydia Dunn, Norman Foster, Lord Laidlaw and Alistair McAlpine, Baron McAlpine of West Green.

== Former "non-doms" ==
- Fernand Huts, owner of Katoen Natie
- Jemima Goldsmith
- Zac Goldsmith - pressured by David Cameron into giving up the non-domiciled status he acquired from his father
- Sir Gulam Noon - gave up non-domiciled status in order to become assistant Treasurer to the Labour party
- Lord Paul - gave up non-dom status in 2010 to retain seat in the House of Lords

Lord Ashcroft was arguably the most prominent of these. After some publicity and political pressure, in 2010 he gave up his non-dom status in order to stay in the House of Lords. However, in 2015 he retired as a working peer, which the Financial Times pointed out would allow him to "revive his non-domiciled tax status".
