= Richmond and Barnes =

UK Parliament constituency (1983–1997)

- Former borough constituency for the House of Commons
- County: Greater London
- Major settlements: Richmond, Barnes

1983–1997
- Seats: One
- Created from: Richmond (Surrey) and Twickenham
- Replaced by: Richmond Park; Twickenham

Richmond and Barnes was a parliamentary constituency in the London Borough of Richmond upon Thames, a south-western suburb of the capital. It returned one Member of Parliament (MP) to the House of Commons of the Parliament of the United Kingdom. The constituency was created in 1983 and abolished in 1997.

== History ==
Richmond and Barnes was a Tory-Liberal marginal for its 14-year existence, and was represented for the whole of that time by Jeremy Hanley of the Conservative Party. Hanley's main opponent was Alan Watson of the SDP–Liberal Alliance, who narrowly failed to win the seat in the 1983 and 1987 elections.

== Boundaries ==
The London Borough of Richmond upon Thames wards of Barnes, East Sheen, East Twickenham, Ham and Petersham, Kew, Mortlake, Palewell, Richmond Hill, and Richmond Town.

The constituency consisted of the northern part of the London Borough of Richmond upon Thames, being centred on the districts of Richmond and Barnes. It largely replaced the former Richmond (Surrey) constituency in 1983, and was largely replaced by the Richmond Park constituency in 1997.

== Members of Parliament ==
Election	Member	Party
1983	Jeremy Hanley	Conservative
1997	constituency abolished: see Richmond Park and Twickenham	

== Elections ==
1979 notional result
Party	Vote	%
Conservative	22,022	46.3
Liberal	19,533	41.1
Labour	5,341	11.2
Others	667	1.4
Turnout	47,563	
Electorate		

=== Elections in the 1980s ===
General election 1983: Richmond and Barnes
Party	Candidate	Votes	%	±%
Conservative	Jeremy Hanley	20,695	46.5	+0.2
Liberal	Alan John Watson	20,621	46.4	+5.3
Labour	Keith Vaz	3,156	7.1	−4.1
Majority		74	0.1	−5.1
Turnout		44,472	79.7	−1.6
Conservative win (new seat)				

General election 1987: Richmond and Barnes
Party	Candidate	Votes	%	±%
Conservative	Jeremy Hanley	21,729	47.7	+1.2
Liberal	Alan John Watson	19,963	43.9	−2.5
Labour	Michael Gold	3,227	7.1	0.0
Green	Christina Matthews	610	1.3	New
Majority		1,766	3.9	+3.8
Turnout		44,919	83.2	+3.5
Conservative hold		Swing		

=== Elections in the 1990s ===
General election 1992: Richmond and Barnes
Party	Candidate	Votes	%	±%
Conservative	Jeremy Hanley	22,894	50.7	+3.0
Liberal Democrats	Jenny Tonge	19,025	42.2	−1.7
Labour	Don Touhig	2,632	5.8	−1.3
Green	Judy S.M. Maciejowska	376	0.8	−0.5
Natural Law	Charles H. Cunningham	89	0.2	New
Independent	Richard Meacock	62	0.1	New
Anti-Federalist League	Angela K.F. Ellis-Jones	47	0.1	New
Majority		3,869	8.5	+4.6
Turnout		45,125	84.9	+1.7
Conservative hold		Swing	+2.3	

== See also ==
- List of parliamentary constituencies in London

== Sources ==
- Leigh Rayment's Historical List of MPs – Constituencies beginning with "R" (part 1)
