= Zac Goldsmith =

British politician and journalist (born 1975)

The Right Honourable The Lord Goldsmith of Richmond Park PC
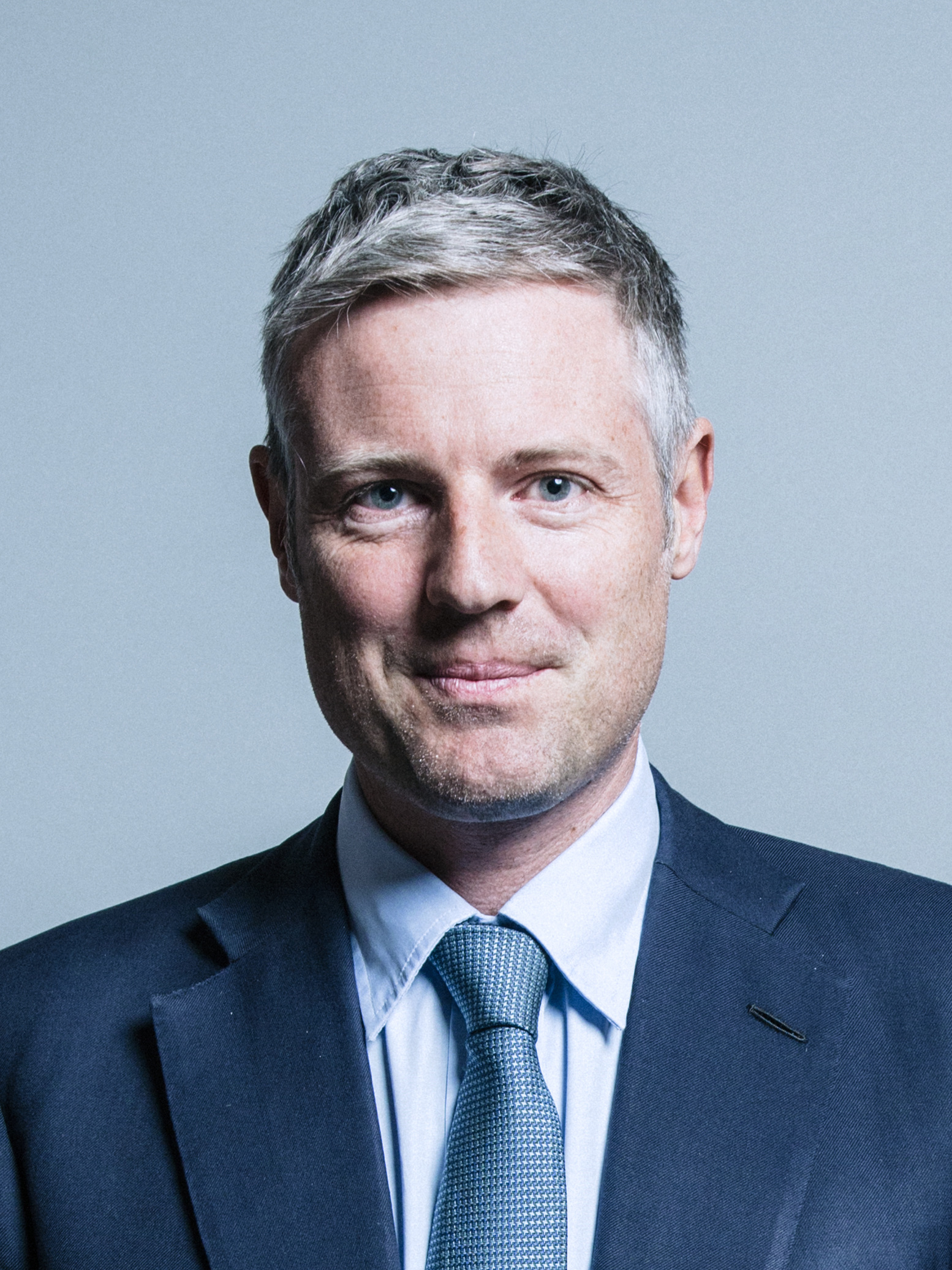
- Official portrait, 2017

Minister of State for Overseas Territories, Commonwealth, Energy, Climate and Environment (Note: Asia, Energy, Climate and Environment from September to October 2022.)
- In office 22 September 2022 – 30 June 2023
- Prime Minister: Liz Truss; Rishi Sunak
- Preceded by: Amanda Milling
- Succeeded by: The Lord Benyon

Minister of State for the Pacific and the International Environment (Note: Parliamentary Under-Secretary of State from July to September 2019. Jointly held with the Department for Environment, Food and Rural Affairs; and jointly held with the Department for International Development from 2019 to September 2020. He acquired responsibility for the Pacific from Heather Wheeler in 2020.)
- In office 27 July 2019 – 15 September 2022
- Prime Minister: Boris Johnson
- Preceded by: David Rutley
- Succeeded by: The Lord Benyon

Member of the House of Lords
- Lord Temporal
- Life peerage 7 January 2020

Member of Parliament for Richmond Park
- In office 8 June 2017 – 6 November 2019
- Preceded by: Sarah Olney
- Succeeded by: Sarah Olney
- In office 6 May 2010 – 25 October 2016
- Preceded by: Susan Kramer
- Succeeded by: Sarah Olney

Personal details
- Born: Frank Zacharias Robin Goldsmith; 20 January 1975 (age 51) Chelsea, London, England
- Party: Conservative (2005–2016; 2017–present)
- Other political affiliations: Independent (2016–2017)
- Spouse(s): Sheherazade Bentley (m. 1999; div. 2010) Alice Rothschild (m. 2013; div. 2023) Hum Fleming (m. 2025)
- Children: 6
- Parents: James Goldsmith; Lady Annabel Vane-Tempest-Stewart
- Relatives: Goldschmidt family; Rothschild family (by marriage)
- Website: Official website

Frank Zacharias Robin Goldsmith, Baron Goldsmith of Richmond Park (born 20 January 1975) is a British politician, life peer and journalist who served as Minister of State for Overseas Territories, Commonwealth, Energy, Climate and Environment from September 2022 to June 2023. A member of the Conservative Party, he was its candidate at the 2016 London mayoral election and was Member of Parliament (MP) for Richmond Park from 2010 to 2016 and 2017 to 2019. Ideologically characterised as having liberal and libertarian views, he is known for his support for environmentalism and localism.

Born in London into the Goldschmidt family, the son of billionaire businessman and financier Sir James Goldsmith, he was privately educated at both Eton College and the Cambridge Centre for Sixth-form Studies. In 1998, his uncle Edward Goldsmith made him editor of The Ecologist, a position he retained until 2007. Goldsmith was appointed Deputy Chairman of the Conservative Quality of Life Policy Group in 2005, co-authoring its report published in 2007. Goldsmith was placed on the Conservative A-List of potential candidates in 2006 and, in March 2007, was selected through an open primary to contest the constituency of Richmond Park against incumbent Liberal Democrat MP Susan Kramer. At the 2010 general election, he was elected to Parliament winning the seat with a majority of 4,091 votes.

At the 2015 general election, Goldsmith was returned to the Commons with a majority of 23,015, an increase of almost 19,000 votes since 2010, against his nearest opponent. He was chosen as the Conservative candidate for the 2016 election for mayor of London, which he subsequently lost to Sadiq Khan of the Labour Party. Goldsmith announced his resignation as an MP following the government's decision in October 2016 to approve construction of a third runway at Heathrow Airport. His resignation triggered a by-election in the Richmond Park constituency in which Goldsmith stood as an independent candidate. He was defeated by Sarah Olney of the Liberal Democrats with a majority of 1,872 votes. After Theresa May called the 2017 general election, Goldsmith was reselected as the Conservative Party candidate for Richmond Park and won with a narrow majority of 45 votes.

Goldsmith was made Parliamentary Under-Secretary of State for Environment and International Development on 27 July 2019 and was promoted to Minister of State with the right to attend Cabinet on 10 September 2019. He was defeated at the 2019 general election, again by Sarah Olney, with a majority of 7,766 votes. After the election, Boris Johnson awarded Goldsmith with a life peerage, making him a member of the House of Lords and allowing him to retain his ministerial position. On 13 February 2020, he acquired additional responsibility for the Pacific. After Liz Truss became Prime Minister in September 2022, Goldsmith became Minister of State for Asia, Energy, Climate and Environment, later being reappointed by Rishi Sunak with new responsibilities for overseas territories and the Commonwealth. He resigned in June 2023 in opposition to what he claimed was the Sunak ministry's lack of interest in environmental policy.

== Early life and career ==
Goldsmith was born on 20 January 1975 at the Chelsea and Westminster Hospital in Chelsea, London. He is the middle child of Sir James Goldsmith, a member of the Goldsmith family of German Jewish and French descent, and his then mistress and later third wife, the Anglo-Irish aristocrat, Lady Annabel Vane-Tempest-Stewart, the daughter of the 8th Marquess of Londonderry. Goldsmith has stated "I was brought up by my father to identify very strongly as Jewish." He was raised at Ormeley Lodge in Ham with his siblings, Jemima and Ben. He is half-brother to Robin and India Jane Birley, his mother's children from her first marriage. As a child, he was an avid reader of naturalist Gerald Durrell's works and developed a committed passion for David Attenborough's wildlife documentaries. He later recalled, "He was my hero, and it was his work that made me fall in love with the natural world". His ecological interests were nurtured further when his father gave him a copy of Helena Norberg-Hodge's book Ancient Futures, with a note saying: "This will change your life".

Goldsmith was educated at four independent schools: King's House School in Richmond and The Mall School in Twickenham, followed by Hawtreys School, near Great Bedwyn in Wiltshire, and Eton College in Berkshire; he was expelled from Eton after drugs were found in his room. Goldsmith later said of the event "Cannabis and snus were found in my room. I was guilty throughout my time at School, but on this one occasion I was innocent. But it seemed pointless at the time to put up any resistance. I learned my lesson, I think you could say." He went on to achieve four A-Levels at Cambridge Centre for Sixth-Form Studies.

Goldsmith travelled throughout the world with the International Honours Programme (courtesy of his uncle Edward Goldsmith), including to Thailand, New Zealand, Mexico, Hungary and Italy. Goldsmith lived in California for two years, working at first for the think tank Redefining Progress from 1995 to 1996, and later as a researcher for Norberg-Hodge's International Society for Ecology and Culture (ISEC) during 1996–98. While working with ISEC, Goldsmith travelled to India, spending a short time on an ashram in Rajasthan and later lived in Ladakh for six months, studying traditional cultures and helping run a tourist education programme.

In 1997, Goldsmith was appointed reviews editor of The Ecologist by his uncle Edward Goldsmith, the magazine's founding editor, owner and publisher. In 1998, he became editor-in-chief and director of The Ecologist but did not draw a salary. He relaunched The Ecologist on 28 March 2000 in a new format, transforming its academic journal-style into a current affairs-magazine format, thereby broadening its appeal and trebling its circulation. In January 2006, when assuming a post as the reviewer of the Conservative Party's environmental policies, it was announced that he was to step down as editor.

== Political career ==
=== Joining the Conservatives: 2005–2010 ===
Goldsmith admired Conservative leader David Cameron

Goldsmith joined the Conservative Party in 2005. He had previously supported the election campaigns of Michael Gove and Joanne Cash. He stated he regarded Labour as "the party of big business" which had become shaped by big lobbying groups and which had become too authoritarian and centrist. After the Conservatives lost the 2005 general election to Labour, they elected David Cameron as their new leader. Goldsmith thought highly of Cameron, expressing the view that while he was generally "cynical about politicians", he felt that Cameron was different. Describing Cameron, he said "I don't know David Cameron very well... [but] I like him. I think you can judge a book by its cover... [and] I think the cover is pretty good." At the 2005 Conservative annual conference, Goldsmith stated he saw no contradiction between his interest in environmental issues and being a Conservative.

In December 2005, David Cameron approved Goldsmith's appointment as deputy chairman of the Quality of Life Policy Group, under former Environment Secretary John Gummer. The group was tasked with examining matters such as carbon emissions, climate change, clean air and transport with a view to formulating Conservative policy. The group's 600-page report, jointly authored by Goldsmith and Gummer, was presented at the Royal Institute of British Architects on 13 September 2007. Its proposals included a moratorium on airport expansions; taxing short-haul flights and highly polluting vehicles, with proceeds being used to cut the cost of clean alternatives; and rebates on stamp duty and council tax for people who improved the energy efficiency of their homes. The report drew criticism from Labour, several Conservative politicians and the aviation industry. For Cameron, the report was an important part of rebranding the party to escape its reputation as the "Nasty Party" and pledged many of its recommendations would be included in the manifesto.

David Cameron recognised Goldsmith as a good prospective parliamentary candidate and in May 2006 placed him on the Conservative A-List of young and diverse candidates whom he wanted to stand at the 2010 general election. The Conservatives initially placed Goldsmith as their candidate for the safe seat of East Hampshire. Goldsmith felt uneasy about representing this constituency, with which he had no previous connection, and thus pulled out to avoid carpetbagging. He then entered the Richmond Park Conservative Association's open primary, which he won in March 2007.

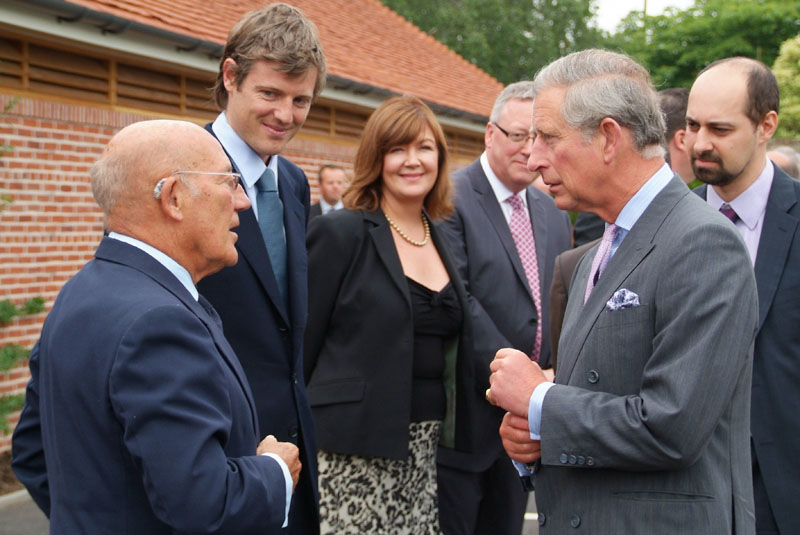
Stirling Moss, Goldsmith, Charles, Prince of Wales and event founder Steven Glaser at the launch of the annual Revolve Eco-Rally on U.N. World Environment Day, 3 June 2007

In 2007, Goldsmith opposed the opening of a superstore by supermarket chain Sainsbury's in Barnes. He spearheaded a referendum conducted by the Electoral Reform Society to poll local residents on the issue, working closely with a local campaign group. With a turnout of 61.6%, more than 4,000 residents, who made up 85% of the votes cast, came forward to oppose the construction of the store at White Hart Lane. Sainsbury's ultimately opened the branch after revising its planning application.

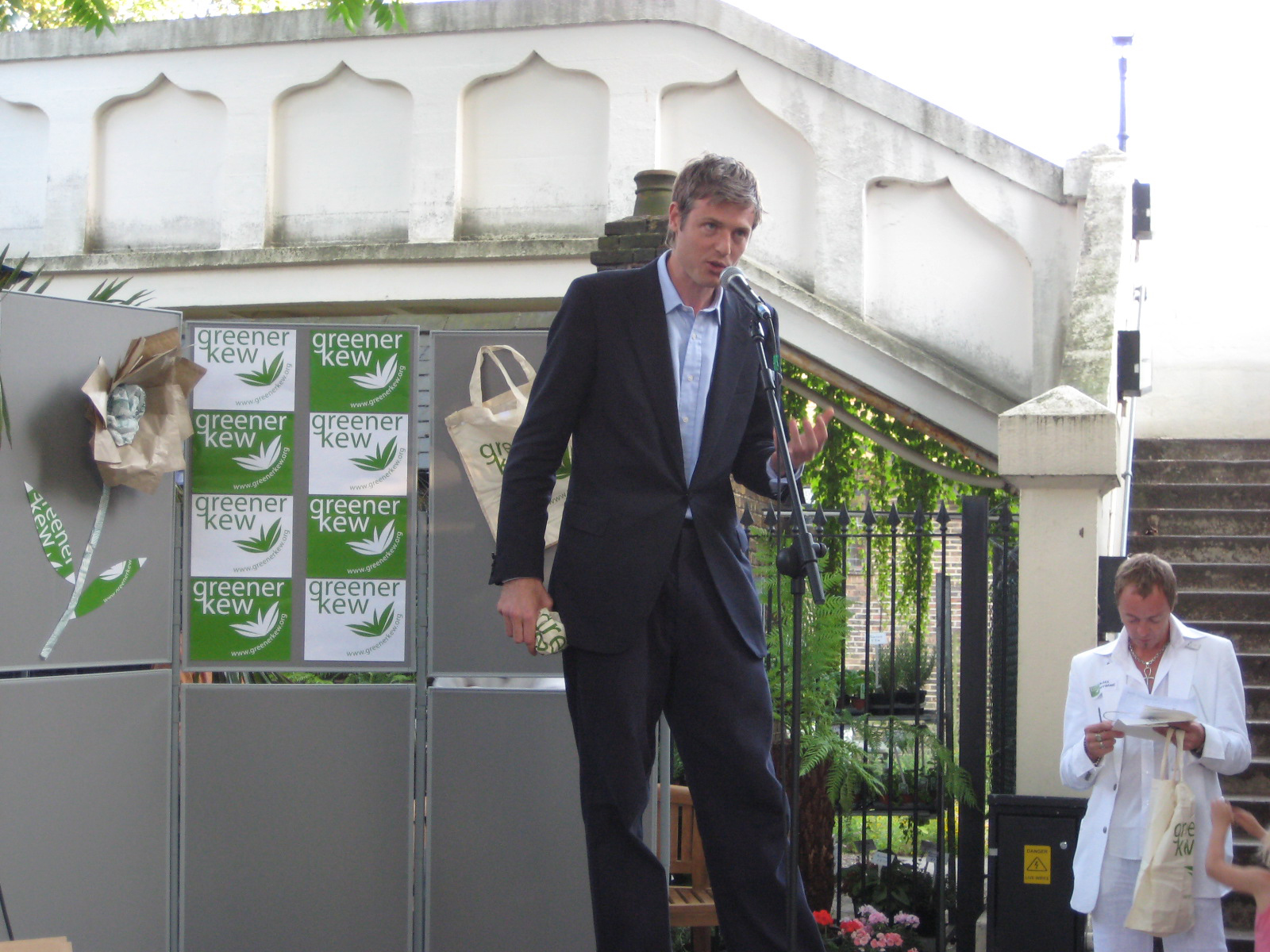
Goldsmith campaigning at a green rally outside Kew Gardens Tube Station at Kew, London in June 2008

In 2008 Goldsmith was asked to comment about donations of £7,000 to his Party while not on the electoral register. Commenting on the issue, Goldsmith explained: "everything has been declared on time and accurately; however, for a few weeks last year I was not on the Electoral Roll, my name having been removed from Kensington and Chelsea's voter list, given that I was in the process of signing up for Richmond. Whatever was donated in that time may have to be repaid, but there is no suggestion that anything other was improprietous".

In late 2009, the press asserted that Goldsmith had non-domiciled status and that as a London resident, albeit a discretionary beneficiary, he had use of British properties through a trust set up by his late father. Goldsmith responded, in a statement about the suggestion of tax avoidance, that he has "always chosen to be tax resident in the UK" and virtually all his income was paid into British banks. Of non-dom status as a result of his late father's international status, Goldsmith added that he had already instructed his accountants to relinquish it of his own volition by early 2009. However, Chris Huhne, the Liberal Democrat home affairs spokesperson, said that Goldsmith was likely to have avoided paying £580,000 per year for each year in the previous decade as a result of his non-dom status. In February 2016, The Evening Standard quoted Goldsmith stating that non-domiciled status let individuals "make lifestyle choices to avoid paying tax" and saying "I've never been accused of not paying tax."

In 2010, the Labour government sought to recover its expenditure on a programme of remedial works on the public car parks in Richmond Park through the introduction of parking fees for visitors to the royal park. Goldsmith organised a rally attended by over 1,000 people in the royal park on 30 January 2010 in conjunction with other local Conservatives to protest the proposed charging.

=== Parliamentary career: 2010–2015 ===
Goldsmith defeated the Liberal Democrat MP Susan Kramer in Richmond Park at the 2010 general election; he saw a 7% swing in the vote go to him. The election resulted in a hung parliament and the formation of a coalition government led by Cameron and the Conservatives. At the next general election, in May 2015, he increased his majority from 4,091 to 23,015 votes. He achieved an increase of 8.5 percent of the share of the vote from the 2010 general election, receiving a total of 58.2 percent of all votes cast by his constituents. This was the biggest increase in majority of any MP at the 2015 general election.

In July 2010, Channel 4 News questioned whether Goldsmith had under-reported the sums spent on signs, stickers and jackets used in his campaign and claimed his campaign spending was much higher than other MPs they investigated. They presented their case online including scans of the spending documents. He insisted he had followed the same procedures as other candidates and countered by stating Channel 4 engaged in sleazy unethical journalism. He argued expenditure was being spread across multiple campaigns: "The formula we used is exactly the same formula ... as used by MPs and candidates around the country. Every decision we took was approved by electoral experts at Conservative Central Office". It was debated whether signs that said "Vote Zac Goldsmith" and "Vote Conservative" could be charged to the election budget for a local election candidate when that other candidate was not mentioned on the sign. Goldsmith responded that it had been "checked" and was "standard practice" across the country. The second question was about jackets with "I back Zac" stickers on the back. "They cost £2,168 but you only said you paid (spent) £170". Goldsmith said the stickers cost £170 and the jackets were "off the shelf" and would be reused for other campaigns. Goldsmith clashed with presenter Jon Snow, who accused him of "prevaricating" in a confrontational live interview on Channel 4 News. Both parties criticised each other in the aftermath. Snow suggested Goldsmith take the matter to Ofcom, which rejected Goldsmith's complaint about Snow and Channel 4 News' conduct.

The Bureau of Investigative Journalism complained to the Electoral Commission over the report about Goldsmith's expenses. The Commission announced, following their initial 5-day assessment, they had decided to upgrade the investigation to the status of "case under review" and to make enquiries "in order to establish the facts of the matter". They reported in December 2010, deciding in "the absence of any evidence of intentional circumvention of the rules, we do not consider that a referral to the police is appropriate." However, they did observe the cost-sharing between general election and local election contests was "not consistent with the Commission's guidance or good practice", the submission was "unclear in places" and Goldsmith's campaign may have overspent by £966 in the short campaign.

Goldsmith co-ordinated a cross-party group of MPs to call for a Hillsborough-style inquiry into child sex abuse. He co-wrote a letter to Home Secretary Theresa May demanding a full independent inquiry with six other MPs: Tim Loughton, Tom Watson, Simon Danczuk, John Hemming, Tessa Munt and Caroline Lucas. The Prime Minister, David Cameron, initially rejected the call but was subsequently forced to concede, after 145 further MPs added their names to Goldsmith et al.'s letter.

In December 2015, Goldsmith voted in support of the government's plans to expand the aerial bombing of Islamic State targets. He also endorsed a government bill that would have restricted trade unions in their ability to strike.

=== London mayoral campaign ===
"I work very closely with David Cameron on a range of issues. I get along very well with him. He knows that if there's a policy I don't support, I will stand my ground. I don't think it suits anyone's interest to have an MP or councillor or a mayor who submits themselves to a kind of voluntary lobotomy simply to vote the party line."

— Goldsmith on his relationship with government if elected Mayor.

Goldsmith had initially ruled out standing as a candidate in the 2016 London mayoral election, stating that "I think people have had quite enough of white male Etonians". However, as the election approached, it became apparent that he was the Conservatives' strongest potential candidate. On 9 June 2015, Goldsmith announced his interest in running for the mayoralty of London after encouragement both from members of his own party and others (notably the former Green Party Candidate Jenny Jones, Baroness Jones of Moulsecoomb). Before declaring himself as a nominee, Goldsmith spent around £50,000 of his own money sending a postal ballot to his 77,000 Richmond Park constituents, asking them if they would consent to him standing for Mayor. A majority who responded supported him. On 23 June 2015, he formally put his name forward with his three rivals being Andrew Boff, Syed Kamall, and Stephen Greenhalgh. The London Conservatives held an open primary, in which 9,227 votes were cast; of these, 6,514 went to Goldsmith. In October, Goldsmith's selection as Conservative Mayoral candidate was announced in a press release without accompanying ceremony.

During his campaign, Goldsmith repeatedly spoke out against proposed expansion of Heathrow Airport. He stated that he was confident that the Cameron government would reject Heathrow expansion but that if they did not then he would resign as an MP and trigger a by-election. In July 2015, he also condemned the Airports Commission report written by the economist Howard Davies which backed Heathrow expansion; Goldsmith claimed that Davies had already decided on his conclusion before producing the three-year study. Davies responded by alleging that Goldsmith was lying, but the latter stood by his claim, as evidence citing that information he supplied to Davies' commission was not taken seriously.

A key issue in the campaign was London's housing shortage. To deal with the problem, Goldsmith suggested building "high density, low-rise buildings which are in keeping with communities" on publicly owned land currently controlled by the boroughs or Transport for London. He went against prevailing opinion in London by welcoming foreign investment into the property market, arguing that this investment could help to finance more house building. He ruled out supporting development on London's Green belt, although stated that option might need to be considered in ten or fifteen years hence if the city's population continued to rise. He also suggested an expansion of the London congestion zone, and endorsed Boris Johnson's plans to construct a Garden Bridge across the River Thames.

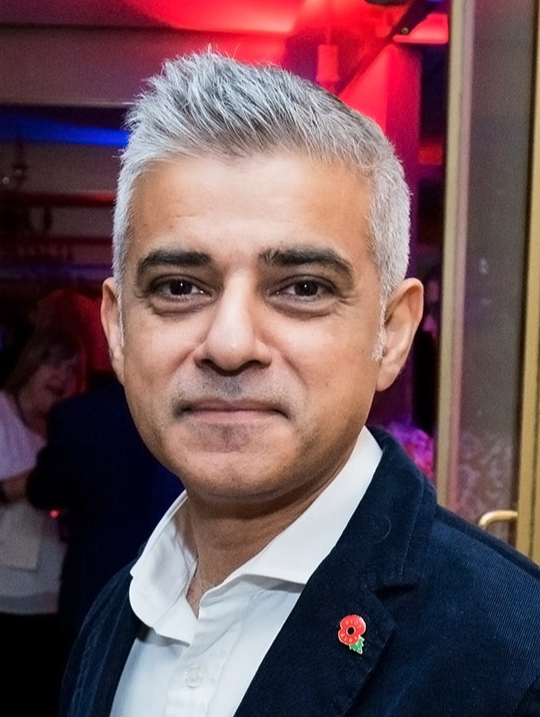
Goldsmith was defeated by Labour candidate Sadiq Khan.

Goldsmith hired Lynton Crosby's company to run his campaign and appointed Mark Fulbrook as his campaign director. Goldsmith's campaign emphasised connections between London Labour candidate Sadiq Khan and newly elected socialist Labour leader Jeremy Corbyn, despite Khan's own attempts to distance himself from Corbyn. Both the Conservative campaign and several Conservative-aligned newspapers sought to tar Khan as an apologist for, or even sympathiser with, Islamic extremism. Goldsmith's campaign material referred to Khan as "radical and divisive", while comments on the Conservatives' Facebook campaign material often displayed anti-Muslim sentiment.

Labour accused Goldsmith's campaign of using 'dog-whistle politics' and racist or Islamophobic campaigning. In April 2016, Labour MP Yvette Cooper wrote "What started as a subtle dog-whistle is becoming a full blown racist scream". Conservative politician Baroness Warsi also criticised Goldsmith for using an image of the bus destroyed in the 7/7 terrorist attacks to illustrate an article he wrote. Goldsmith was also accused of 'racial profiling' voters in the London mayoral campaign. Goldsmith strongly denied claims his campaign had been racist and accused his rival Khan of 'playing the race card'. The Conservatives responded it was "utterly predictable that Labour label their opponents as racists", citing the fact that during the 2008 mayoral campaign, the party had also accused Johnson of employing racist rhetoric.

Khan's campaign emphasised Goldsmith's comparative lack of political experience and employment history. Khan portrayed Goldsmith as a spoiled dilettante, stating that he "never finished anything he starts ... he's somebody who before becoming a member of parliament has had one proper job, which was given to him by his uncle."

Goldsmith went on to lose the election to Sadiq Khan in the second round by 315,529 votes. Khan achieved 57% of the vote to Goldsmith's 43% and polled a record number of votes after second round votes were counted. Goldsmith's campaign was later criticised by Labour MP David Lammy for being "divisive" by focusing on attempts to link Khan to Islamist extremists.

=== By-election and political return: 2016–2019 ===
Goldsmith had promised, as far back as a June 2012 edition of the BBC's Sunday Politics programme, he would not stand as a Conservative candidate at the next election if the Conservative Party backed the expansion of Heathrow Airport, an issue to which he was strongly opposed. In December 2016, he lost a by-election in Richmond Park he had initiated by the act of resigning his seat. He stood as an independent instead of as a Conservative but was endorsed by UKIP. Neither UKIP nor the Conservatives stood a candidate in the by-election. He lost to Sarah Olney of the Liberal Democrats, who overturned his majority of 23,000.

In April 2017, Goldsmith was reselected as the Conservative Party candidate for Richmond Park prior to the upcoming snap general election to be held on 8 June. He regained the constituency as a Conservative candidate but winning with a majority of just 45 votes, the fifth-slimmest in the election. Following Boris Johnson's election as Conservative Party leader and Prime Minister in July 2019, Goldsmith was appointed as Parliamentary Under-Secretary of State at both the Department for Environment, Food and Rural Affairs and Department for International Development. After Amber Rudd's resignation as Work and Pensions Secretary in September 2019, Johnson reshuffled his frontbench and promoted Goldsmith to Minister of State with the right to attend Cabinet. Upon his promotion, he was sworn in as a member of the Privy Council, giving him the honorific title "The Right Honourable" for life.

Liberal Democrat Sarah Olney defeated Goldsmith by 7,766 votes in the 12 December 2019 snap general election (despite the election providing the Conservative Party's largest share of votes since 1979) and won back the Richmond Park seat. Shortly after his electoral defeat, it was announced he would continue to serve as a minister in the government by being awarded a life peerage and sitting as a member of the House of Lords.

=== House of Lords: 2020–present ===
On 7 January 2020, Goldsmith was created Baron Goldsmith of Richmond Park, of Richmond Park in the London Borough of Richmond upon Thames. His ennoblement to the House of Lords was criticised by the Muslim Council of Britain as "rewarding racism", and by opposition politicians as being "cronyist" and "hypocritical" in light of a tweet Goldsmith had made in 2012 which described the House of Lords Reform Bill as being one that promoted "party apparatchiks" and "insulated" them from "democratic pressure". However, Labour MP and former Shadow Environment Secretary Kerry McCarthy said she believed Goldsmith was committed to the government's promise to maintain standards in environmental regulation after Brexit, adding: "because of that I welcome the fact that he is still around to carry on and do that work".

In his maiden speech in the House of Lords, Goldsmith rebutted accusations of cronyism, saying "One political rival described me as a 'turd that won't flush' – a phrase my children are very unlikely to let me forget. But equally I know many of those heroic people engaged in the battle to protect this extraordinary planet and the species it holds are cheered by having another voice in Parliament and it is an enormous privilege."

In Boris Johnson's post-Brexit reshuffle, Goldsmith was given the additional role of Minister of State for Foreign Affairs with responsibility for the Pacific. In June 2020, Johnson announced the Department for International Development would be merged with the Foreign and Commonwealth Office to form the Foreign, Commonwealth and Development Office which was subsequently created in September of that year.

On 1 June 2020, the Parliamentary Commissioner for Standards concluded Goldsmith had breached the standards commission's code of conduct by his use of publicly-funded stationery and postage for political purposes around 1 November 2019, shortly before the 2019 general election. The commission released a report in June upholding an allegation made against Goldsmith on 5 November 2019. The report said they had considered the "timing, tone, and content of the letter and concluded that it was of a party-political nature rather than a communication for parliamentary purposes". He accepted the commission's finding and agreed to re-pay £8,954.33 to cover the mailing costs.

In September 2022, Goldsmith was appointed Minister of State for Asia, Energy, Climate and Environment by Liz Truss. He was reappointed by Rishi Sunak with new responsibilities for overseas territories and the Commonwealth.

On 30 June 2023, Goldsmith resigned from his ministerial position, saying the government showed "apathy" towards environmental issues and that Sunak's "simply uninterested" attitude had paralysed policymaking. A day earlier, he had been named as one of 10 parliamentarians accused of waging a "co-ordinated campaign" to interfere with a Commons investigation into Boris Johnson, which led opposition parties to call for Goldsmith's dismissal. The report from the Privileges Committee cited a retweet from 9 June in which Goldsmith commented that the outcome of the investigation was predetermined. In a letter to Goldsmith, Sunak said that Goldsmith had "decided to take a different course" after being asked to apologise for the tweet. Speaking to the BBC, Goldsmith said that he was happy to apologise for his public comments as a minister, but that his resignation was "a long time coming".

== Political positions and views ==
The Guardian described Goldsmith as "a bit of a liberal and a bit of a libertarian" on social issues, who has also gained a reputation for environmentalism due to his opposition to his government's plans to expand Heathrow airport. Journalist Dave Hill noted that the "young Goldsmith was pro-small business and small communities, localist and conservationist" and was "against overbearing government from whatever the source". Goldsmith has spoken and written about environmental causes in Britain and has twice been invited to debate at the Oxford Union, where he has delivered keynote addresses.

As a contributing author of the book We Are One: A Celebration of Tribal Peoples, published in late 2009, Goldsmith has explored global diversities and threats facing humankind. Among the other contributors are western writers, such as Laurens van der Post, Noam Chomsky, Claude Lévi-Strauss and indigenous persons, such as Davi Kopenawa Yanomami and Roy Sesana. The book is composed of a collection of photographs, statements from tribal people, and essays from international authors, politicians, philosophers, poets, artists, journalists, anthropologists, environmentalists and photojournalists. In his essay, Goldsmith writes about how his travel around the world in his youth gave him first-hand experience of the misery brought by the promise of western "progress" and "development". He reflects on the culture of tribal people and, in reverence to it, urges people in the modern world to question what "progress" can really mean.

Goldsmith advocates greater direct democracy, such as Switzerland's model of using referendums. Goldsmith believes that direct democracy would help combat feelings of disenfranchisement among people and increase accountability. He has also argued in favour of introducing measures so that MPs can be subject to recall referendums midway through their term if a sufficiently large number of their constituents petition for it.

Goldsmith is a long-standing Eurosceptic and supporter of Brexit. He first announced he was in favour of the UK leaving the European Union in 2013 and has consistently voted against UK membership of the EU in Parliament. In March 2019, he was one of 265 Conservative MPs that backed a no-deal Brexit being left on the table.

Among Goldsmith's key interests is education; in an interview with Fairtrade fashion designers People Tree, he said "I've put a big emphasis on schools. One campaign is to ensure every school [is] fitted with a proper kitchen that can double up as a classroom. Children need to know where their food comes from and how to cook it. We're also trying to help every school source its food sustainably and locally".

Less than 24 hours after the 2017 Barcelona attacks, Goldsmith shared his brother's controversial post on social media which compared ISIS's antisemitism to the views of the left-wing British campaign group Momentum.

== Fundraising ==
Goldsmith funded the Organic Targets Bill Campaign to promote organic farming in 1999. He has been a member of the advisory board of the JMG Foundation, which disburses grants globally to a range of environmental advocacy groups using the financial legacy left by James Goldsmith. He is also on the National Gardens Scheme's Council of Trustees as one of four Ambassadors. He is a Patron of the Mihai Eminescu Trust which conserves and maintains communities in Transylvania and the Maramureş, and the philanthropic organization, Fortune Forum (together with Jimmy Wales). He is a longstanding donor to the Soil Association. In 2007, he was a participant at the Soil Association Annual Conference, during which he competed in an organic fashion show on 25 January and afterwards debating on a Question Time panel on 27 January.

== Family and personal life ==
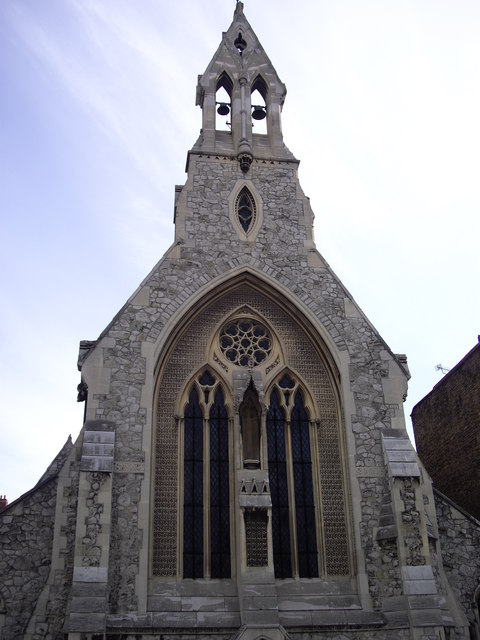
St Simon Zelotes Church, London

Goldsmith has been described as having a "soft voice and unhurried manner". Referring to Goldsmith's actions in the 2016 Mayoral campaign, journalist Dave Hill described Goldsmith as "the courtly patrician who [would have] hired a heavy mob to do his fighting for him".

After his father's death in 1997, Goldsmith is believed to have inherited between £200 million and £300 million out of the reported £1.2 billion estate. In a 2009 article in The Guardian, some tax experts speculated his income could amount to £5 million per year from the trust left to him alone. He was the second richest member in the 2010–2015 Parliament after Richard Benyon. Goldsmith enjoys gambling; in 2004 he won £53,000 in a televised card game and he has had a financial stake in the Mayfair-based bookmakers Fitzdares. A backgammon and poker player, he also pursues other sporting interests including cricket.

Goldsmith was married for ten years to Sheherazade Bentley with whom he has three children: two daughters, Uma Romaine and Thyra, and one son, James. The couple married on 5 June 1999 at St Simon Zelotes Church in London and separated in April 2009, receiving a decree nisi on 10 May 2010. Sheherazade and Goldsmith were featured in Vanity Fair's 67th Annual International Best-Dressed List among "Best-Dressed Couples". Goldsmith said in 2000 that he wore Savile Row suits which had belonged to his late father. His divorce from Bentley was much covered in the gossip columns.

In 2013 at London Wetland Centre in his constituency, Goldsmith married banking heiress Alice Miranda Rothschild, the daughter of the late Amschel Rothschild and his wife, Anita Patience Guinness, of the Guinness Brewery family. They have a daughter, Dolly, born in July 2013. Their second child, a son named Max, was born in January 2016. On 25 April 2017, Alice gave birth to a daughter named Edie. Alice's sister, Kate Rothschild, and his brother, Ben Goldsmith, had been married until 2013. In March 2023, Zac and Alice announced they had separated. They divorced that same year.

On 6 September 2025, he married Hum Fleming, great-niece of Ian Fleming, in the Cotswolds.

Goldsmith was banned from driving for a year after he was caught speeding seven times in 2023. He was also fined £5,500 and ordered to pay a surcharge of £2,000 and costs of £700. In sentencing, District Judge Daniel Sternberg warned that drivers who speed "emit more harmful emissions" even in hybrid and electric cars, a reference to Goldsmith's interest in environmental matters.

He and his family live in Barnes.

== Awards ==
- In 2003, Goldsmith was awarded the Beacon Prize as Young Philanthropist of the Year for his contribution to environmental awareness and protection.
- In 2004, he received the Mikhail Gorbachev-founded Green Cross International's Global Green Award for International Environmental Leadership.
- In 2011, he was joint winner of the inaugural BusinessGreen Politician of the Year Award with Tim Yeo MP.
- In 2014, he was also awarded by The Patchwork Foundation for being The Best Conservative Newcomer MP of the Year.
- In October 2022 Goldsmith was awarded the Order of the Etoile Équatoriale by President Ali Bongo Ondimba of the Republic of Gabon in recognition of his international environmental leadership https://www.focusgroupemedia.com/discours-integral-du-chef-de-letat-ali-bongo-ondimba-a-la-levee-du-drapeau-du-gabon-au-commonwealth/
- In 2022 Colombian President Ivan Duque awarded Goldsmith the Order of Boyacá in the Grade of Grand Cross for his international environmental leadership. The Honour was founded by Simon Bolivar and is the highest honour that can be given to a non Colombian national. https://twitter.com/ivanduque/status/1552674311839834119?lang=en

== Ancestry ==
Goldsmith is a member of the prominent Goldsmith family. Goldsmith's family has a long history in politics. His grandfathers were both Conservative Members of Parliament: his paternal grandfather, Frank Goldsmith, was a Conservative MP, while his mother's father, The 8th Marquess of Londonderry, represented County Down as a Unionist MP in the British House of Commons, when he was still styled Viscount Castlereagh. His maternal great-grandfather, The 7th Marquess of Londonderry, was an Ulster Unionist politician. Another maternal ancestor was Robert, Viscount Castlereagh, Chief Secretary for Ireland and British Foreign Secretary. Goldsmith's sister Jemima was married from 1995–2004 to Imran Khan, who would go on to become the Prime Minister of Pakistan from 2018–2022, with whom she has two sons.

Ancestors of Zac Goldsmith

16. Benedict Hayum Salomon Goldschmidt
8. Adolphe Goldschmidt
17. Jeannette Kann
4. Major Frank Goldsmith
18. Joseph Moses
9. Alice Emma Moses Merton
19. Caroline Königswarter
2. James Goldsmith
10. Pierre Moulier
5. Marcelle Moulier
1. Zac Goldsmith
24. Charles Vane-Tempest-Stewart, 6th Marquess of Londonderry
12. Charles Vane-Tempest-Stewart, 7th Marquess of Londonderry
25. Lady Theresa Helen Talbot
6. Robin Vane-Tempest-Stewart, 8th Marquess of Londonderry
26. Henry Chaplin, 1st Viscount Chaplin
13. Edith Vane-Tempest-Stewart, Marchioness of Londonderry
27. Lady Florence Sutherland-Leveson-Gower
3. Lady Annabel Vane-Tempest-Stewart
28. Richard Henry Combe
14. Major Boyce Combe
29. Esther Hollway
7. Romaine Combe
30. Henry Tombs
15. Mabel Tombs
31. Georgina Janet Stirling

== See also ==
- Family of Imran Khan
- List of people with non-domiciled status in the UK

== Bibliography ==
- Gummer, John; Goldsmith, Zac (September 2007). Blueprint for a Green Economy – Submission to the Shadow Cabinet. Conservative Quality of Life Policy Group.

== Notes ==
Parliament of the United Kingdom
Preceded by Susan Kramer	Member of Parliament for Richmond Park; 2010–2016	Succeeded by Sarah Olney
Preceded by Sarah Olney	Member of Parliament for Richmond Park; 2017–2019	Succeeded by Sarah Olney
Political offices
Preceded by David Rutley	Minister of State for the Pacific and the International Environment; 2019–2022	Succeeded by The Lord Benyon
Orders of precedence in the United Kingdom
Preceded by The Lord Darroch of Kew	Gentlemen; Baron Goldsmith of Richmond Park	Followed by The Lord Grimstone of Boscobel
