= Sarah Olney =

British politician (born 1977)

Sarah Olney MP
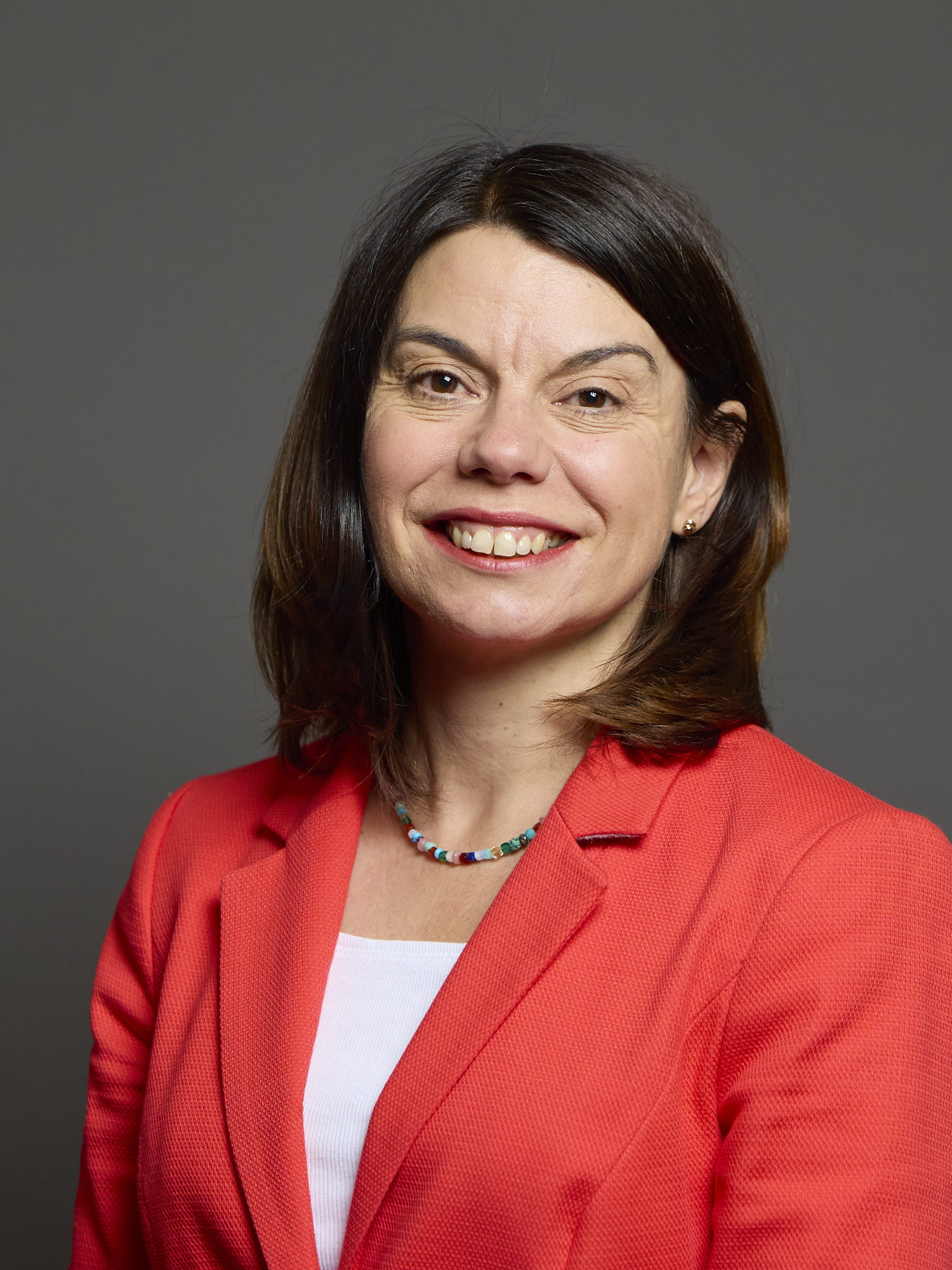
- Official portrait, 2024

Member of Parliament for Richmond Park
- Incumbent
- Assumed office 12 December 2019
- Preceded by: Zac Goldsmith
- Majority: 17,155 (33.3%)
- In office 1 December 2016 – 3 May 2017
- Preceded by: Zac Goldsmith
- Succeeded by: Zac Goldsmith

Liberal Democrat portfolios
- 2017: Education
- 2020–2022: International Trade
- 2020–2022: Transport
- 2020–2024: Business and Industrial Strategy
- 2022–2024: Treasury
- 2024–2025: Cabinet Office
- 2025–present: Business and Trade

Personal details
- Born: Sarah Jane McGibbon; 11 January 1977 (age 49) Frimley, Surrey, England
- Party: Liberal Democrats
- Spouse: Benjamin Olney (m. 2002)
- Children: 2
- Education: King's College London (BA)
- Website: www.saraholney.com

Sarah Jane Olney (née McGibbon; born 11 January 1977) is a British Liberal Democrat politician who has served as the Member of Parliament (MP) for Richmond Park since 2019, previously holding the seat from 2016 to 2017. Olney has served as the Liberal Democrat spokesperson for the Treasury from July 2022 to 2024. She previously served as the spokesperson for business and industrial strategy from January 2020 to 2024 and again since September 2025, she also previously served as Spokesperson for the Cabinet Office from 2024 to 2025.

Olney was first MP for Richmond Park for six months, from a by-election in December 2016 to the general election in June 2017, before she regained the seat at the 2019 general election, facing off against Zac Goldsmith in all three elections. She was the Liberal Democrat spokesperson for international trade from January to September 2020 and for education from May to June 2017. While out of Parliament, she was a financial accountant for Historic Royal Palaces, from 2018 to 2019.

== Early life and career ==
Sarah McGibbon was born in Frimley on 11 January 1977 to Ian and Rosalyn McGibbon. She was educated at All Hallows Catholic School in Farnham and then studied English Literature and Language at King's College London. She initially worked as a bookseller in Hatchards, Piccadilly, from 1998 to 2000.

Olney became a qualified accountant at the Association of Chartered Certified Accountants in 2016. She worked as an accountant at Barclays, Arts & Business, Distilled Ltd, SCi Sales Group and the National Physical Laboratory in Teddington until she entered politics after the 2015 general election.

Olney joined the Liberal Democrats in July 2015, having said that she was a liberal dissatisfied with the direction of the United Kingdom.

== Parliamentary career ==
On 25 October 2016, Conservative MP Zac Goldsmith announced his resignation from the House of Commons over his objection to his party's support for a third runway at Heathrow Airport, triggering a by-election in his seat of Richmond Park. Goldsmith stood in the by-election as an independent candidate. On 30 October 2016, Olney was announced as the Liberal Democrats' candidate for the by-election. At the by-election, Olney was elected as the Member of Parliament (MP) for Richmond Park, with 49.6% of the vote and a majority of 1,872.

After her election to Parliament, Olney reaffirmed her opposition to the building of a third runway at Heathrow Airport.

Shortly after her election, Olney ended a radio interview in which she was pressed on her support for a second Brexit referendum. Supporting a second referendum subsequently became official Liberal Democrat policy.

Olney voted against the triggering of Article 50, as she had indicated during the by-election campaign that she would do so. She believed that another referendum should have been held once the exact terms of Britain's exit from the EU had been announced.

In the run-up to the snap 2017 general election, Olney was recorded urging Liberal Democrats to vote for Labour MPs in seats where Labour candidates stood a better chance of defeating Conservatives, rather than Liberal Democrat candidates. Olney referred to the Liberal Democrat candidate for Ealing Central and Acton as a "paper candidate" and voiced her support for the incumbent Labour Party MP Rupa Huq.

At the snap 2017 general election, Olney lost her seat in Richmond Park, coming second with 45.1% of the vote behind Zac Goldsmith, who stood as the Conservative candidate.

On 9 September 2017, it was announced that she would be taking up the post of chief of staff for Liberal Democrat leader Sir Vince Cable.

It was reported by the Evening Standard in April 2018 that Olney had been interviewed under caution by the police for allegedly breaking official spending limits in the Richmond Park by-election. The Crown Prosecution Service ruled that there was no evidence, and closed the case.

In 2019, she was officially confirmed as the Liberal Democrat candidate for Richmond Park at the next general election. At the 2019 general election, Olney was elected as MP for Richmond Park with 53.1% of the vote and a majority of 7,766.

In May 2021, alongside celebrities and other public figures, Olney was a signatory to an open letter from Stylist magazine which called on the government to address what it described as an "epidemic of male violence" by funding an "ongoing, high-profile, expert-informed awareness campaign on men's violence against women and girls".

Olney was re-elected to Parliament as MP for Richmond Park at the 2024 general election with an increased vote share of 55.4% and an increased majority of 17,155.

On 3 December 2024, Olney's ten minute rule bill calling for the voting system to adopt proportional representation passed on a symbolic vote.

== Personal life ==
In 2002, she married Benjamin (Ben) James Olney, a town planner presently working as a manager for High Speed 1. The couple have a son and a daughter. They have also had another son, who is deceased.

Parliament of the United Kingdom
Preceded by Zac Goldsmith	Member of Parliament for Richmond Park; 2016–2017	Succeeded by Zac Goldsmith
Preceded by Zac Goldsmith	Member of Parliament for Richmond Park; 2019–present	Incumbent
