= High-touch =

Business term

High-touch refers to the involvement of personal attention and service. In business, the term often refers to situations where trust between the customer and employed individual(s) is necessary. High-touch areas include: medicine, wealth management, reference desk, real estate, and legal. Stock trading done by humans, as opposed to automated trading, is also referred to as high-touch.

== Origins ==
The term was coined in 1982 by John Naisbitt in his book Megatrends. It was explored further by Naisbitt in his follow-up book High Tech/High Touch.

== In medicine ==
High-touch may also refer to the frequency in which a surface is touched.

In pharmacology, high-touch may refer to medicines that require temperature control, ongoing drug management, or compliance monitoring.

=== Relation to high tech ===
High-touch was coined as a term in response to "high tech". High tech, as opposed to high-touch, is when customers don't need human interaction to perform activities such as onboarding, ordering, and account management. High tech services, such as chatbots, allow customers to get what they want on-demand.
