= Sheherazade Goldsmith =

British environmentalist and jeweller

- Born: Sheherazade Ventura Bentley; 14 March 1974 (age 52); Camberwell, London, England
- Occupations: Columnist, jeweller
- Spouse: Zac Goldsmith (m. 1999; div. 2010)
- Children: 3
- Writing career
- Subjects: Organic food and gardening; environmentalism; jewellery

Sheherazade Ventura Goldsmith (née Bentley; 14 March 1974) is a British environmentalist, jeweller, and columnist.

During the 1990s, Goldsmith worked in the fashion industry, and after 2000 engaged in environmental activism undertaking a variety of green initiatives starting with an organic food business that she ran in London until 2002. In 2007 she edited a guide to eco-friendly living, A Slice of Organic Life: Get Closer to the Soil Without Going the Whole Hog, which she followed a year later by publishing a how-to guide for celebrating Christmas in an environmentally friendly way, called A Greener Christmas.

In 2013 she co-founded the jewellery brand Loquet London with the model Laura Bailey.

Goldsmith frequently contributed as a columnist to various national newspapers and other UK publications, but does not any longer.

== Early life ==
Goldsmith was born at King's College Hospital in Camberwell, London, to John Bentley, a financier and entrepreneur, and Viviane Ventura, a British actress, who successfully brought a paternity suit against him. She was privately educated at both the French Lycée in London and Aiglon College.

== Career ==
Goldsmith was known as Sheherazade Bentley prior to marriage, her pen name in newspaper columns such as The Sunday Times. Since her divorce she has continued as a writer and spokeswoman for various environmental causes.

=== Business ===
In 2000, while pregnant with her first child, she and her friend Serena Cook opened Deli'Organic, an organic delicatessen in Battersea's so-called "Nappy Valley". The café also soon became one of the first of its kind to set up what W called a "thriving business delivering fresh, organic baby food" to interested mothers. Goldsmith cooked children's food from the shop's kitchen and served customers for nearly two years, her deli's best-seller being the full English breakfast: restaurant critic A. A. Gill said in a review, "The Deli'Organic is, despite everything, quite fun in a homespun, uncomfortable... way." After the birth of her second child in 2002, Goldsmith closed down the enterprise.

=== Journalism ===
Goldsmith has contributed articles on environmental concerns, organic food and products, style and beauty, and other topics to a variety of national newspapers and publications. She wrote a regular column for The Sunday Times on organic food and dining from October 2002 to March 2003. She has also written columns for The Daily Telegraph and has been a food contributor to Harper's Bazaar magazine. Goldsmith has also contributed columns and recipes to various media organisations and brand names such as Sophie Grigson's The Fairtrade Everyday Cookbook, Waitrose, and the UKTV Food channel.

=== Books ===
Goldsmith is editor-in-chief of A Slice of Organic Life: Get Closer to the Soil Without Going the Whole Hog, which was published by Dorling Kindersley in 2007 and became a best-seller The book offers more than 90 self-contained projects to grow food organically, cook homegrown produce, and keep specific livestock, with different applications for city dwellers, suburban populations and homeowners with vast lands. The publication's projects range from growing strawberries in a hanging basket to keeping chickens or energy saving tips for home. BookPage called the book "an earnest, friendly manual that'll entice you into the kitchen to make jam, even if you've never before successfully boiled water": its central aim was to illustrate "that you can live anywhere and still make a contribution to the environment without actually making any sacrifices". After the book's publication, Goldsmith stated, "there is a huge misconception that being green is more labour-intensive, more expensive and means giving up all your creature comforts."

Goldsmith's second book, called A Greener Christmas, was published by Dorling Kindersley in September 2008. A Greener Christmas is a collection of various projects to help families celebrate an environmentally-friendly Christmas.

=== Activism ===
Goldsmith's interest in environmental issues was sparked by motherhood: "I became interested when I became pregnant with Uma, and then suddenly became very concerned with what I was eating, what I was washing with and so on, and the effect it would have on the baby. When your child is born you start to worry about a zillion other aspects too, such as toys, food and toiletries," she told Health and Organic Living magazine. She is an admirer of Sir David Attenborough, whose "love, passion and also his understanding of nature and what she can offer" she has often praised. She is a longstanding event organiser and donor of the Soil Association, for which she also served as a spokesperson during its Organic Fortnight from 6 to 21 September 2008. In 2019, Goldsmith said she had not repeated some environmental measures from a previous house on her west London home, noting that solar panels had not greatly contributed and that the home was heated by a gas system.

== Philanthropy ==
Goldsmith is a supporter of London-based charities: she has been a committee member of the HOPING Foundation, and is also a supporter of Great Ormond Street Hospital Children's Charity, for which she helped organise a fundraising fashion show with the designers Robinson Valentine, which made her wedding dress.

== Personal life ==
She married Zac Goldsmith on 5 June 1999 at St Simon Zelotes Church in London. They have three children: daughters Uma Romaine and Thyra, and son James. The couple separated in 2009, amid allegations of infidelity, as Zac had an affair with Alice Rothschild, and their divorce in 2010 was highly contentious.

Goldsmith had a relationship with filmmaker Alfonso Cuarón from 2011 to 2018. She has been in a relationship with Matthew Freud since 2021.

== See also ==
- Goldsmith family

== Bibliography ==
- A Slice of Organic Life: Get Closer to the Soil Without Going the Whole Hog. Dorling Kindersley. 2007.
- A Greener Christmas. Dorling Kindersley. 2008.
