= Richmond Park (constituency) =

UK Parliament constituency (since 1997)

Coordinates: 51.447°N 0.278°W

- Borough constituency for the House of Commons
- Interactive map of boundaries from 2024
- Location within Greater London
- County: Greater London
- Electorate: 75,037 (March 2020)
- Major settlements: Richmond and part of Kingston

Current constituency
- Created: 1997
- Member of Parliament: Sarah Olney (Liberal Democrats)
- Seats: One
- Created from: Richmond and Barnes and Kingston upon Thames

Richmond Park is a constituency in Greater London represented in the House of Commons of the UK Parliament. Since 2019, its Member of Parliament (MP) has been Sarah Olney of the Liberal Democrats.

Previously held by Zac Goldsmith of the Conservative Party from 2010, Goldsmith stood down in 2016 in protest over expansion of Heathrow Airport. Olney won the seat at the resulting by-election, defeating Goldsmith who was then standing as an independent. Goldsmith regained the Conservative nomination and the seat in the 2017 general election, before losing to Olney a second time at the 2019 general election. Olney was re-elected in the 2024 general election with an increased majority.

== Constituency profile ==
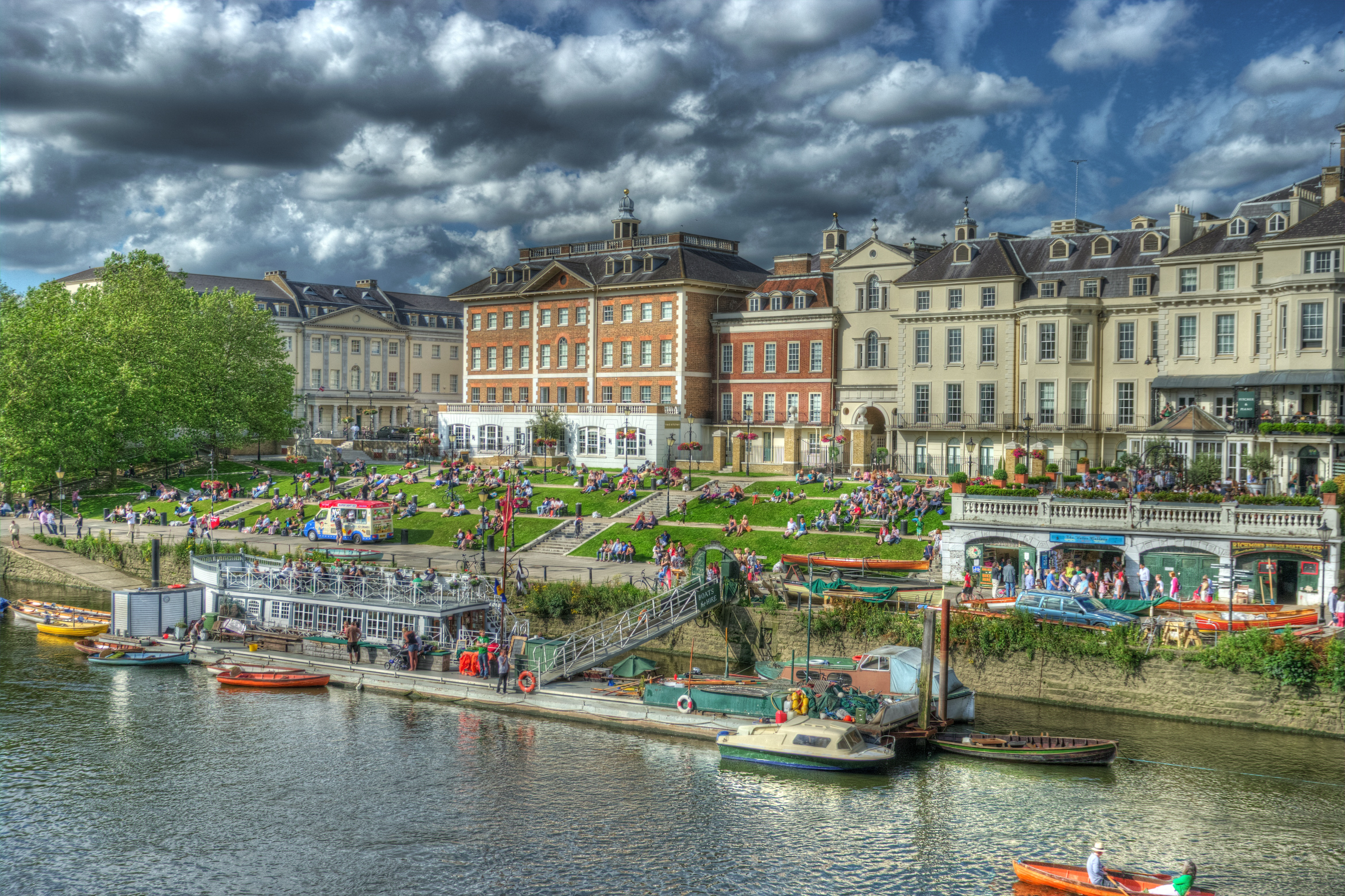
Richmond and the River Thames

Richmond Park is a constituency in Greater London in England, mostly within the Borough of Richmond upon Thames and partly within the Borough of Kingston upon Thames. The constituency is centred on the town of Richmond and also includes the neighbourhoods of Kew, Sheen (North and East), Mortlake, Barnes, Ham, Coombe and Kingston Vale.

This is an affluent, suburban constituency located around 8 miles (13 km) south-west of the centre of London. Richmond was founded in the early 16th century when King Henry VII built the now-demolished Richmond Palace. The town is known for its well-preserved Georgian architecture and its status as one of London's wealthiest and most upmarket areas. The constituency is named after Richmond Park, the largest of London's Royal Parks. Most residents live in expensive flats and terraces; the average house price across the constituency is over £1 million, more than triple the UK average.

Richmond Park has a high population of middle-aged adults with families and a low proportion of young adults and retirees. Residents have very high levels of income and average rates of homeownership. The child poverty rate is extremely low at less than one-quarter the UK-wide rate. Residents are very well-educated and a high proportion work in the health, technology and arts sectors. The percentage claiming unemployment benefits is low. White people made up 76% of the population at the 2021 census. Around a quarter of the White population are of non-British origin, including significant Irish, German and American communities. Asians were the largest ethnic minority group at 11%.

At the local borough council level, almost all seats in the constituency are represented by Liberal Democrats, except Kingston Vale, which elected Conservatives. Voters in Richmond Park overwhelmingly supported remaining in the European Union in the 2016 referendum; an estimated 71% voted to remain compared to the UK-wide figure of 48%, making Richmond Park one of the top 40 most remain-voting constituencies out of 650 across the UK according to Electoral Calculus.

== History ==
The seat was created in 1997 from Richmond and Barnes, held by Jeremy Hanley of the Conservative Party; and a northern section of Kingston upon Thames, held by his party colleague, former Chancellor of the Exchequer Norman Lamont. Hanley was selected as the Conservative candidate at the first election for the seat, but lost to Jenny Tonge of the Liberal Democrats. The Liberal Democrats retained the seat until 2010, when it was won by the Conservative candidate Zac Goldsmith by over 4,000 votes. Goldsmith, who blended fiscal conservatism with environmental activism, easily secured re-election in 2015, with a majority of over 23,000. Meanwhile, the Liberal Democrats haemorrhaged support and fell to their lowest level since 1970 (when the Richmond, Surrey constituency was fought, albeit on different boundaries to Richmond Park).

In October 2016, Goldsmith announced his resignation as an MP in protest against the Conservative government's decision to allow a third runway to be built at Heathrow Airport. Goldsmith stood as an independent in the by-election held on 1 December; he was defeated by Sarah Olney, a Liberal Democrat, despite the Conservatives fielding no candidate. It was the first by-election in the constituency since its creation in 1997.

In April 2017, Goldsmith won the Conservative nomination for the seat and stood in the general election on 8 June, at which Olney sought re-election. Despite Olney gaining the largest increase in vote share between general elections in the country, and Goldsmith one of the largest falls, he regained the seat for the Conservatives with a majority of just 45 votes. Goldsmith's six months out was the shortest time a defeated MP had remained so before regaining the same seat. Olney retook the seat in the 2019 general election, with a majority of nearly 8,000.

In December 2023, the Labour Party included the seat in its published list of 211 non-battleground seats, suggesting they did not see it as winnable. In the 2024 general election, Sarah Olney was re-elected on an increased majority, although her total number of votes was down from 2019 due to decreased turnout.

== Boundaries ==
=== Historic ===
1997–2010: The London Borough of Richmond upon Thames wards of Barnes; East Sheen; Ham and Petersham; Kew; Mortlake; Palewell; Richmond Hill; and Richmond Town, and the Royal Borough of Kingston upon Thames wards of Cambridge; Canbury; Coombe Hill; and Tudor.

Map of boundaries 2010–2024

2010–2024: The London Borough of Richmond upon Thames wards of Barnes; East Sheen; Ham, Petersham and Richmond Riverside; Kew; Mortlake and Barnes Common; North Richmond; and South Richmond, and the Royal Borough of Kingston upon Thames wards of Canbury; Coombe Hill; Coombe Vale; and Tudor.

As part of its Fifth periodic review of Westminster constituencies, the Boundary Commission (Note: For the subregion used see South London) made minor changes to re-align the constituency boundaries with the boundaries of the local government wards. This involved moving the entirety of the Beverley ward into Kingston and Surbiton. It had been split between the two constituencies after ward boundaries were changed in 2002. The public consultation on proposed changes across the boroughs of Kingston and Richmond received 11 submissions, of which ten were in support. The new boundaries came into effect at the 2010 general election.

From Kingston Railway Bridge the limits clockwise were: the middle of the River Thames north-east to Hammersmith Bridge and then southeast within Barnes to Barn Elms; the outer limit of Putney Common; the houses east of Hallam Road and Dyers Lane; Upper Richmond Road westwards; the Beverley Brook south to Richmond Park itself; (Note: Thus east is Roehampton in the London Borough of Wandsworth, part of Putney seat) the park walls to Robin Hood Gate on the A3 road; the Beverley Brook south, (Note: Having included the residential section of the A3 at the Beverley Brook Interchange) west across Malden Golf Course; Coombe Road; Coombe Vale both in New Malden; the South West Main Line west of New Malden station; the Kingston branch back to the stated start. The seat comprised the old Surrey part of Richmond upon Thames (borough), Coombe, Norbiton, and half of Kingston upon Thames.

=== Current ===
Further to the 2023 review of Westminster constituencies, the composition of the constituency from the 2024 general election was reduced to bring it within the permitted electoral range by transferring the Coombe Vale ward (as it existed at 1 December 2020) to Kingston and Surbiton.

Following a local government boundary review of Kingston-upon-Thames which came into effect in May 2022, the constituency now comprises the following from the 2024 general election:

- The London Borough of Richmond upon Thames wards of: Barnes; East Sheen; Ham, Petersham and Richmond Riverside; Kew; Mortlake and Barnes Common; North Richmond; and South Richmond.
- The Royal Borough of Kingston upon Thames wards of: Canbury Gardens; Coombe Hill; Kingston Gate; and a very small part of Coombe Vale.

Richmond Park constituency stretches from Barnes in the north to Kingston upon Thames in the south, and includes the whole of East Sheen, Mortlake, Kew, Richmond, Petersham and Ham. The boundaries also include the Royal Park itself.

== Members of Parliament ==
Election	Member	Party
1997	Jenny Tonge	Liberal Democrats
2005	Susan Kramer	Liberal Democrats
2010	Zac Goldsmith	Conservative
2016 by-election	Sarah Olney	Liberal Democrats
2017	Zac Goldsmith	Conservative
2019	Sarah Olney	Liberal Democrats

== Elections ==
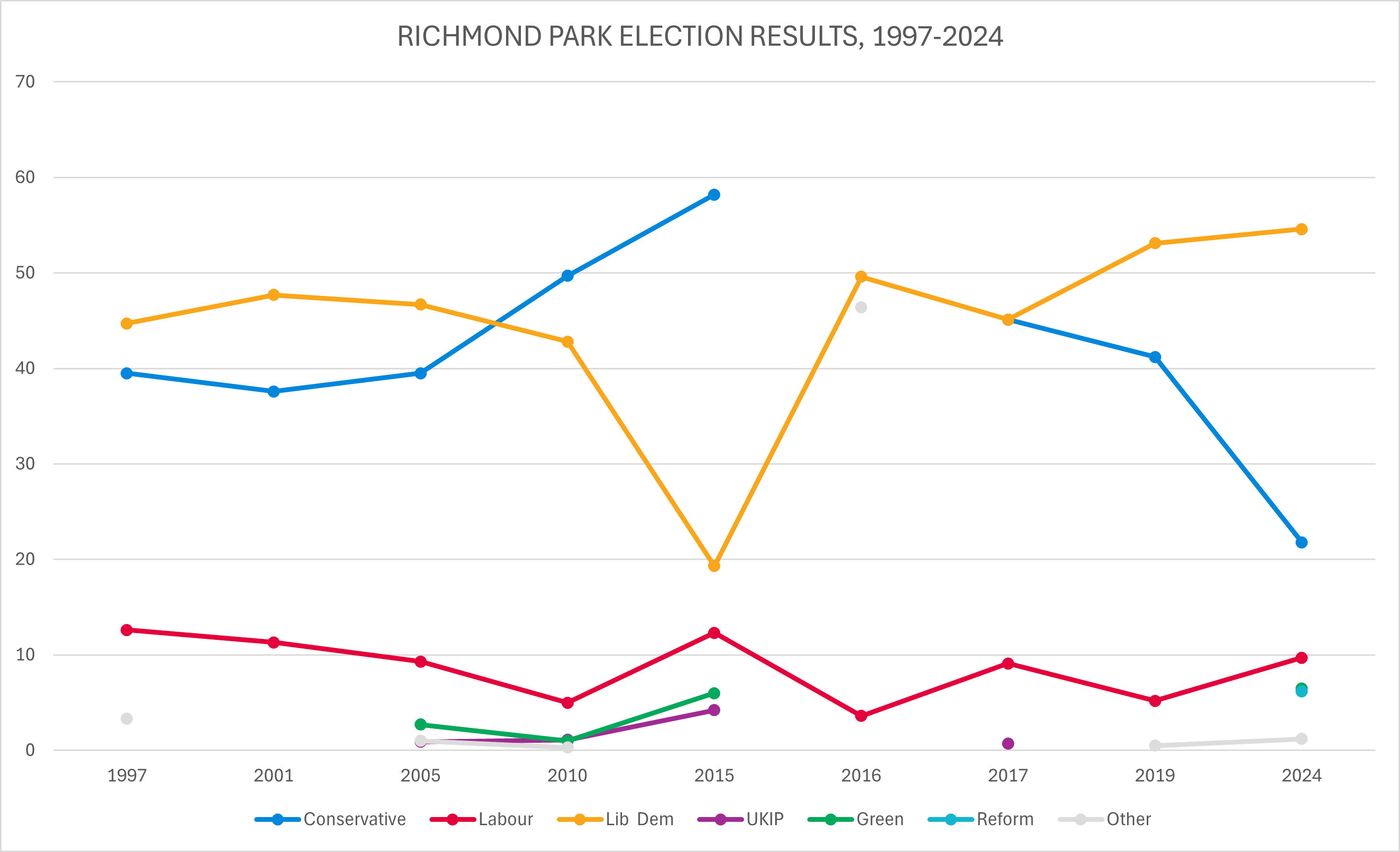
Election results 1997–2024

=== Elections in the 2020s ===
General election 2024: Richmond Park
Party	Candidate	Votes	%	±%
Liberal Democrats	Sarah Olney	28,528	54.6	+1.0
Conservative	Sara Gezdari	11,373	21.8	−18.8
Labour	Laura Coryton	5,048	9.7	+4.4
Green	Chas Warlow	3,416 (Note: The Green Party vote was originally declared as 2728 votes due to spreadsheet formula issues)	6.5	N/A
Reform	Michael Hearn	3,258	6.2	N/A
The Mitre TW9	Chris French	349	0.7	N/A
SDP	Richard Harrison	233	0.5	N/A
Majority		17,155	32.8	+19.8
Turnout		52,205	68.7	
Liberal Democrats hold		Swing	+9.9	

=== Elections in the 2010s ===
General election 2019: Richmond Park
Party	Candidate	Votes	%	±%
Liberal Democrats	Sarah Olney	34,559	53.1	+8.0
Conservative	Zac Goldsmith	26,793	41.2	−3.9
Labour	Sandra Keen	3,407	5.2	−3.9
Independent	Caroline Shah	247	0.4	N/A
Independent	John Usher	61	0.1	N/A
Majority		7,766	11.9	N/A
Turnout		65,067	79.0	−0.1
Registered electors		82,699		
Liberal Democrats gain from Conservative		Swing	+6.0	

General election 2017: Richmond Park
Party	Candidate	Votes	%	±%
Conservative	Zac Goldsmith	28,588	45.1	−13.1
Liberal Democrats	Sarah Olney	28,543	45.1	+25.8
Labour	Cate Tuitt	5,773	9.1	−3.2
UKIP	Peter Jewell	426	0.7	N/A
Majority		45	0.0	−38.9
Turnout		63,330	79.1	+2.6
Registered electors		80,025		
Conservative gain from Liberal Democrats		Swing	−19.4	

2016 Richmond Park by-election
Party	Candidate	Votes	%	±%
Liberal Democrats	Sarah Olney	20,510	49.6	+30.3
Independent	Zac Goldsmith	18,638	45.1	−13.1*
Labour	Christian Wolmar	1,515	3.6	−8.7
Monster Raving Loony	Howling Laud Hope	184	0.4	N/A
Independent	Fiona Syms	173	0.4	N/A
CPA	Dominic Stockford	164	0.4	N/A
One Love	Maharaja Jammu and Kashmir	67	0.1	N/A
No label	David Powell	32	0.0	N/A
Majority		1,872	4.5	N/A
Turnout		41,283	53.6	−22.9
Registered electors		77,243		
Liberal Democrats gain from Conservative		Swing	+21.7 (Note: Calculated on the basis of the vote share for Zac Goldsmith as a Conservative at the previous election and as an independent at this election.)	

*Compared to his vote share as a Conservative candidate at the previous election.

General election 2015: Richmond Park
Party	Candidate	Votes	%	±%
Conservative	Zac Goldsmith	34,404	58.2	+8.5
Liberal Democrats	Robin Meltzer	11,389	19.3	−23.5
Labour	Sachin Patel	7,296	12.3	+7.3
Green	Andrée Frieze	3,548	6.0	+5.0
UKIP	Sam Naz	2,464	4.2	+3.1
Majority		23,015	38.9	+32.0
Turnout		59,101	76.5	−0.4
Registered electors		77,303		
Conservative hold		Swing	+16.0	

General election 2010: Richmond Park
Party	Candidate	Votes	%	±%
Conservative	Zac Goldsmith	29,461	49.7	+10.1
Liberal Democrats	Susan Kramer	25,370	42.8	−3.8
Labour	Eleanor Tunnicliffe	2,979	5.0	−4.2
UKIP	Peter Dul	669	1.1	+0.2
Green	James Page	572	1.0	−1.7
CPA	Susan May	133	0.2	−0.3
Independent	Charles Hill	84	0.1	N/A
Majority		4,091	6.9	N/A
Turnout		59,268	76.9	+3.7
Registered electors		77,751		
Conservative gain from Liberal Democrats		Swing	+7.0	

=== Elections in the 2000s ===
General election 2005: Richmond Park
Party	Candidate	Votes	%	±%
Liberal Democrats	Susan Kramer	24,011	46.7	−1.0
Conservative	Marco Forgione	20,280	39.5	+1.9
Labour	James Butler	4,768	9.3	−2.0
Green	James Page	1,379	2.7	+0.2
UKIP	Peter Dul	458	0.9	+0.2
CPA	Peter Flower	288	0.6	N/A
Independent	Margaret Harrison	83	0.2	N/A
Rainbow Dream Ticket	Rainbow George Weiss	63	0.1	N/A
Independent	Richard Meacock	44	0.1	N/A
Majority		3,731	7.2	−2.9
Turnout		51,374	72.8	+4.8
Registered electors		69,992		
Liberal Democrats hold		Swing	−1.4	

General election 2001: Richmond Park
Party	Candidate	Votes	%	±%
Liberal Democrats	Jenny Tonge	23,444	47.7	+3.0
Conservative	Tom Harris	18,480	37.6	−1.9
Labour	Barry Langford	5,541	11.3	−1.3
Green	James Page	1,223	2.5	N/A
UKIP	Peter Howe	348	0.7	N/A
Independent	Raymond Perrin	115	0.2	N/A
Majority		4,964	10.1	+4.9
Turnout		49,151	67.6	−11.9
Registered electors		72,251		
Liberal Democrats hold		Swing	+2.4	

=== Elections in the 1990s ===
General election 1997: Richmond Park
Party	Candidate	Votes	%	±%
Liberal Democrats	Jenny Tonge	25,393	44.7	+7.0
Conservative	Jeremy Hanley**	22,442	39.5	−12.4
Labour	Sue Jenkins	7,172	12.6	+3.8
Referendum	Jake Pugh	1,467	2.6	N/A
Monster Raving Loony	David Beaupre	204	0.4	N/A
Natural Law	Bruno D'Arcy	102	0.2	N/A
Rainbow Dream Ticket	Peter Davies	73	0.1	N/A
Majority		2,951	5.2	N/A
Turnout		56,853	79.0	
Registered electors		71,951		
Liberal Democrats gain from Conservative		Swing	−9.7	

**Served as the MP for the predecessor constituency of Richmond and Barnes, 1983–97.

== See also ==
- parliamentary constituencies in London
