= Thematic investing =

Thematic investing is a form of investment that aims to identify macro-level trends and the underlying investments that stand to benefit from the materialisation of those trends. Thematic investing aims to seize opportunities arising from megatrends likely to shape the global economy in the decades ahead.

== Definition ==
In 2013, the Financial Times described thematic investing as a broad term with a meaning which can differ depending on the audience. The newspaper sought out the insights of professional investors regarding the matter. Frances Hudson, strategist for multi-asset investing at Standard Life Investments, said: “It tends to be global [and] it can be multi-asset, although within wealth management it is primarily equities. The manager will pick things they think are important, so it might be the emergence of emerging markets, something changing about technology, or an aspect of the environment, such as water shortages.” According to Charles Richardson (Veritas), the benefits include “formulation of strategic context, getting behind future tailwinds, narrowing the universe, and focusing further research while avoiding spot forecasting or market timing.” Jan Luthman (Liontrust) said: “Today’s macro themes are both unprecedented and powerful. Major themes such as globalisation, population ageing and environmental change have significant implications for economies and businesses. Structuring a portfolio so it fits with the forces that are reshaping national and international economies allows it to ‘sail with the wind’; ignoring or misinterpreting these themes can condemn a fund to perpetually sailing against unseen and misunderstood tides.”

In 2022, Galilee Asset Management published a white paper on thematic investing. The company pointed out that the notions of thematic investing and thematic funds are “not legally defined by current regulations” and that “portfolio management companies tend to use the term "thematic investing" in a non-standardized manner, based on heterogeneous criteria, sometimes even specific to each portfolio manager”. In order to build a common definition, the company emphasized that thematic investing is necessarily based on megatrends, and that “a theme must imperatively be structural, international, and multi-sectoral”. Therefore, “a thematic investor should not question the validity of the economic model of the selected theme or its fundamentals for at least the next 20 years”. Galilee Asset Management also pointed out that “A theme is not a sector. It encompasses companies across multiple sectors, whose revenue is generated from the same origin or cause”. This approach tends to “make financial investments more tangible for investors, whether they are individuals or institutional, as they can more easily grasp the meaning behind their asset allocation”. The company also explained that “thematic investing comes with several pitfalls to avoid”, and identified seven golden rules associated with thematic investing:

1. Do not confuse thematic investing with sectoral investing;
2. Do not confuse a theme with a market segment;
3. Do not confuse the economic perspectives with the financial market potential of a theme;
4. Do not believe that ESG is a theme;
5. A theme must necessarily stem from one or more megatrends;
6. A theme must necessarily be structural, international, and multi-sectoral;
7. Do not make a thematic allocation without specific metrics.

== Characteristics ==
Though similar to sector investing, thematic funds tend to cover a variety of sectors and pick companies within these sectors that are relevant to the theme. Thus a health care fund might invest in pharmaceutical companies, health insurance companies, nursing homes, surgical equipment manufacturers and hi-tech and infotech companies that support any of the former.

Thematic investing involves creating a portfolio (or portion of a portfolio) by gathering together a collection of companies involved in certain areas that you predict will generate above-market returns over the long term. Themes are based on a megatrend such as population ageing, the digital revolution, or the rise of the middle class in emerging markets.

Thematic investing is also a topic of debate. Galilee Asset Management cautioned in its 2022 white paper against funds that simply leverage popular marketing themes to attract investors without implementing a rigorous methodology.

== Core areas ==
Some core areas in thematic investing include:

- Sustainable development and related activities
- Demographic trends (especially population ageing)
- Artificial intelligence
- Robotics and automation
- Health and wellness
- Future of Medicine
- Nutrition / Food challenge
- Education
- Water cycle
- Scarce natural resources
- Infrastructures
- Gaming and metaverse
- Cybersecurity
- Luxury and lifestyle

== Investor access and take-up ==
Social trading platforms offer investors easy access to thematic investment. For example, eToro’s copy trading feature enables traders to automatically match portfolios of leading investors, providing exposure to portfolios in areas such as technology, cryptoassets, renewable energy, gaming companies, banks, genome engineering and others.

In April 2020, thematic funds have reached €112bn in asset under management. In Europe, total assets in thematic exchange-traded funds (ETFs) were just under €7 Billion in November 2018. The five largest ETFs account for 73% of total thematic ETF assets. The top two, iShares Automation & Robotics ETF (RBOT) and L&G ROBO Global Robotics and Automation ETF (ROBO), account for almost half.

In November 2018, the UK's Investment Association proposed the inclusion of ETFs, including thematic EFTs, in its sectors. As of June 2019, 13 U.S.-listed thematic ETFs held more than US$1 billion in assets and another nine held more than US$500 million. In Canada, no Canadian-listed thematic ETF holds more than $500 million, with the fund category holding about $2.5 billion as of January 2020.

As of August 2021 there were 65 water funds holding $35 billion in assets under management.
