= 2016 Richmond Park by-election =

UK parliamentary by-election

- 1 December 2016

Richmond Park constituency
- Turnout: 53.4% (▼23.0 pp)
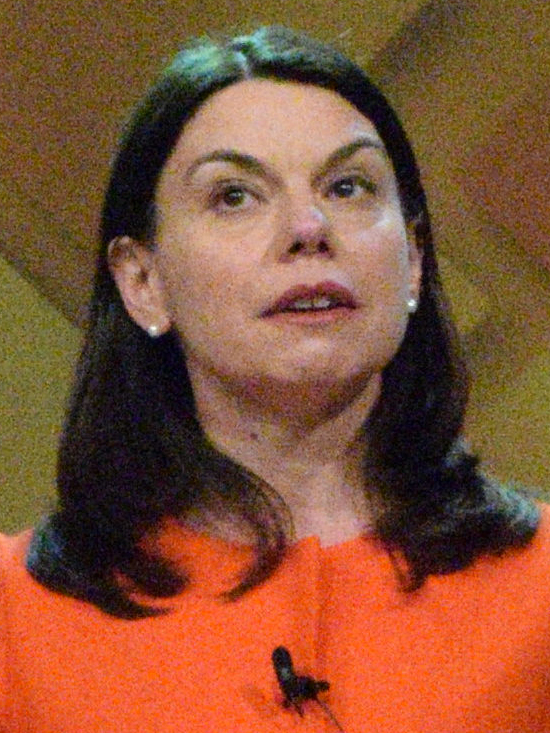

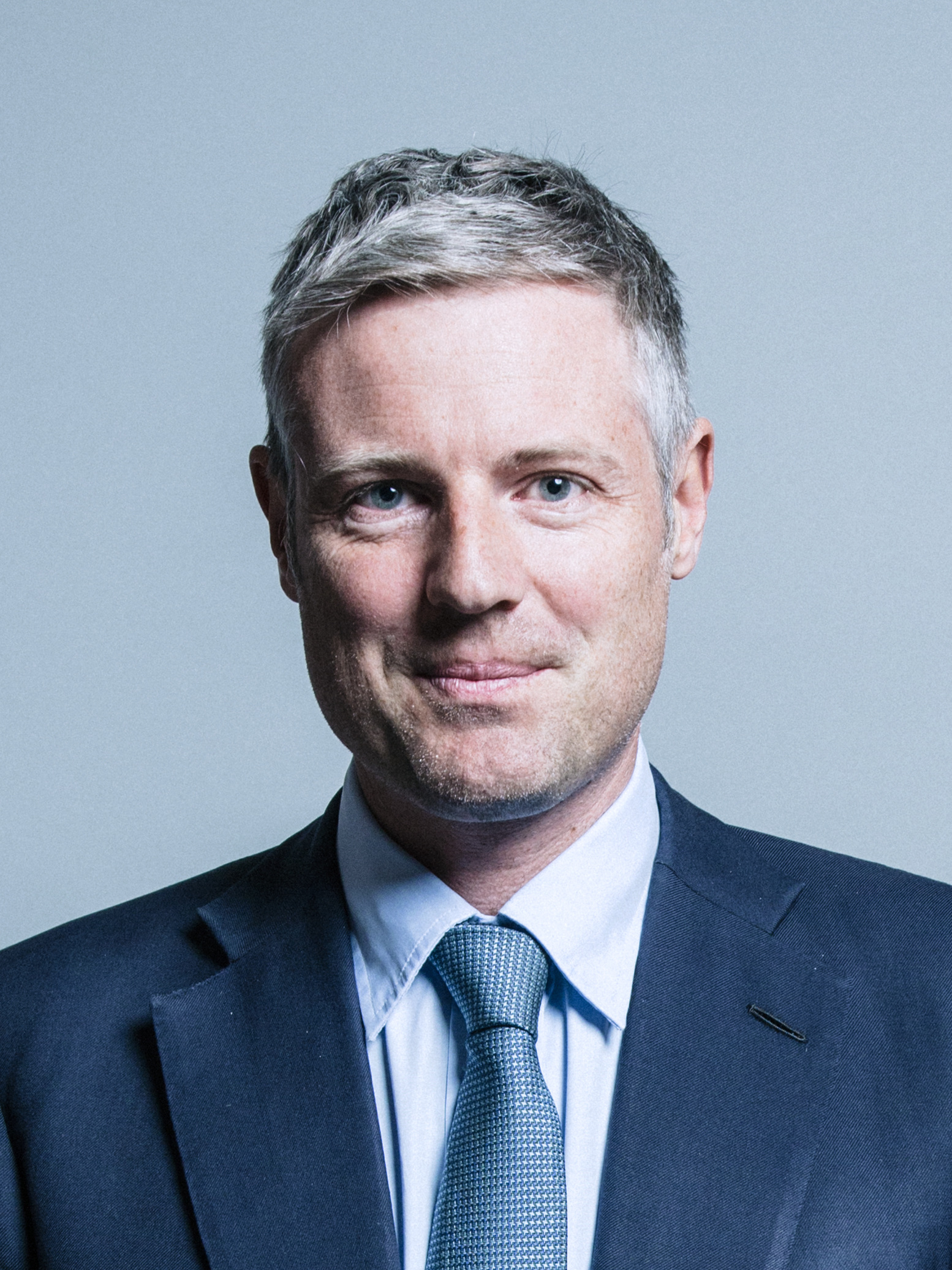
	First party	Second party
Candidate	Sarah Olney	Zac Goldsmith
Party	Liberal Democrats	Independent
Popular vote	20,510	18,638
Percentage	49.7%	45.2%
Swing	▲30.4 pp	▼13.1 pp
MP before election
Zac Goldsmith
Conservative
Elected MP
Sarah Olney
Liberal Democrats

A by-election for the United Kingdom parliamentary constituency of Richmond Park was held on 1 December 2016. It was triggered by the resignation of incumbent Conservative Party Member of Parliament (MP) Zac Goldsmith, who stood down to re-contest his seat as an independent over the Conservative government's proposal for a third runway at the nearby Heathrow Airport. It was won by Sarah Olney of the Liberal Democrats, after a campaign focused on opposition to Brexit.

== Background ==
When first elected in the 2010 general election and on several subsequent occasions, Goldsmith had promised that he would resign if the government supported a third runway at Heathrow. Following his re-election in the 2015 general election, he stood as the Conservative candidate in the 2016 London mayoral election, and lost to Sadiq Khan.

When the May ministry announced on 25 October 2016 that the government would support a third runway at Heathrow, Goldsmith resigned his seat.

== Candidates ==
Goldsmith stood as an independent candidate. He was described as an "Independent Conservative", although that ballot paper description has not been permitted since the Registration of Political Parties Act 1998 came into force.

The Conservative Party decided not to stand an official candidate against him, because the local party members were reported to be supportive of Goldsmith's stance, and putting up a candidate could have split the vote and led to the Liberal Democrats winning the seat. While not officially backed by the Conservative Party, his campaign was supported by some Conservative parliamentarians, including Jacob Rees-Mogg, a supporter of Heathrow expansion and Brexit, as well as Tania Mathias, Theresa Villiers and Lord True, leader of Richmond Council. A leader for the Evening Standard described the Conservative prime minister, Theresa May, as having "endorsed" Goldsmith. The local party's website carried contact details for those wanting to support his campaign.

The Liberal Democrats confirmed Sarah Olney, who was selected to fight the constituency in the event of a snap election, as their candidate for the by-election on 30 October. Olney joined the Liberal Democrats in May 2015, following the general election. She lived locally in North Kingston and worked as an accountant at the National Physical Laboratory in Teddington. Her husband, Ben, was previously employed with the delivery of Heathrow Airport's Terminal 5, 10 years previously. Other notable candidates seeking selection included the future Green Party leader Zack Polanski, who subsequently called for an independent investigation into the selection process before leaving the Liberal Democrats for the Green Party in November the same year.

The day after Goldsmith's resignation, three senior Labour Party MPs suggested that Labour could choose not to stand to maximise the chance of defeating Goldsmith in protest at his support for Brexit and his negative campaign against Sadiq Khan in the mayoral contest. However, other Labour MPs rejected the suggestion, and the party continued with the process of choosing a candidate. On 5 November they selected Christian Wolmar, a transport expert who had stood to be Labour's candidate for London Mayor, finishing fifth out of six candidates. He had opposed Jeremy Corbyn's leadership of Labour. Wolmar defeated four candidates for the nomination: Ellie Cumbo, a researcher at the General Council of the Bar of England and Wales; Barnaby Marder, a local activist backed by Momentum; Sachin Patel, a supermarket manager and Union of Shop, Distributive and Allied Workers representative who contested the seat for Labour at the 2015 election; and Jessica Toale, who had been an advisor to Ivan Lewis MP.

The Green Party leaders hinted that the party might not stand a candidate for fear of splitting the vote. However, they stressed that it was for the local party to decide. The party shared an anti-Brexit and anti-Heathrow expansion stance with the Liberal Democrats. On 2 November, the Richmond Green Party voted against standing a candidate and to back the Liberal Democrat candidate. On 3 November, the Kingston Green Party did the same, and confirmed that there would not be a Green Party candidate in the by-election.

The UK Independence Party, the only other party to stand in 2015, did not put forward a candidate and endorsed Goldsmith.

The Women's Equality Party did not stand a candidate and backed Olney, in opposition to what it described as Goldsmith's record of "racist" campaigning.

Fiona Syms stood as an independent, but said she would join the Conservatives if elected. The 47-year-old activist was critical of Goldsmith, describing his actions as a "tantrum" and saying he was "abandoning" Conservative voters. Syms described herself as a longstanding Conservative supporter, although she had left the party some time before the by-election was called. Syms was married to Conservative MP Robert Syms for 18 years and claimed 25 years of experience in politics as a speechwriter, organiser and constituency worker. She launched her campaign on 5 November.

Regular by-election candidate Ankit Love stood for the One Love Party under his claimed title of Maharaja Jammu and Kashmir.

== Campaign ==
This was the first UK by-election in which the Conservatives declined to field a candidate in a seat they held since the Bristol South East by-election in 1963, which was triggered to allow Tony Benn to regain the seat he was disqualified from holding upon his inheritance of the Stansgate viscounty. Conservative MP Alec Shelbrooke criticised the decision by the party not to stand.

The Liberal Democrats also oppose a third runway at Heathrow. They held the seat from 1997 until 2010, when Goldsmith won. They campaigned on an anti-Brexit position, noting Goldsmith's own support for Brexit whereas the area strongly voted for Remain in the 2016 EU membership referendum. The constituency is estimated to have had a 72% support for Remain. Goldsmith's Mayoral campaign was also expected to become a focal point of campaigning. The Liberal Democrat campaign started quickly, with leader Tim Farron first visiting the constituency on 26 October.

According to the Daily Mirror, bookmakers had Goldsmith as clear favourite, although the Liberal Democrats were favourite for a period. Channel 4 reported senior Liberal Democrats thought odds predicting the Liberal Democrats would do well were over-stated.

Goldsmith said on 28 October that he would be partly funding his campaign himself. He also did not rule out the possibility of re-joining the Conservative Party after the next general election.

A poll released by BMG Research on 28 October showed Goldsmith on 56% of the vote to Olney's 29%. An as-yet unnamed Labour candidate attracted 11% of the vote, with the Green Party and UKIP tied on 2% each. Asked about the main issues in the election, respondents identified Brexit (25%), Goldsmith's records and views (22%), and Heathrow expansion (21%) as the main issues. Goldsmith supporters were more focused on his record and Heathrow, while Olney supporters focused on Brexit and the Conservative government's record. Labour supporters also identified Brexit as their main consideration. Overall, the poll found 60% opposition to the third runway at Heathrow, 25% support with 14% undecided.

Nick Clegg, the former Liberal Democrat leader and Deputy Prime Minister, launched Olney's campaign on 31 October/1 November, stressing the party's opposition to Heathrow. He also argued that the Brexit decision, that Goldsmith supported, led to the decision to support Heathrow expansion.

Labour candidate Christian Wolmar attracted attention for a proposal to ban toilet paper, moving instead to the "hands-free spray toilet" popular in Asia.

An analysis by the King's Fund revealed that the south-west London National Health Service sustainability and transformation plan (STP) is considering cutting acute services at one of five hospitals, including Kingston Hospital, local to the constituency. The Liberal Democrats used this in campaigning to criticise the Conservative government.

Olney was also endorsed by the More United campaign group.

In the final weekend of the campaign, the Liberal Democrats released internal polling putting Goldsmith on 46.7%, the Liberal Democrats on 43.3% and Labour on 9.5%. These figures were disputed: one Conservative MP, Kit Malthouse, a former deputy mayor of London, agreed the election was very close, but the Conservative leader of Richmond Council and Goldsmith ally, Lord True, predicted Goldsmith would do much better.

In the final week of the campaign, Green Party co-leader Caroline Lucas campaigned for Olney, while some other local Green Party members were backing Wolmar instead. Musician and poverty campaigner Bob Geldof also came to the constituency to campaign for Olney. On 30 November, both Olney's and Goldsmith's campaign described the election as close, with the Liberal Democrats' internal polling putting them on 47.2% to Goldsmith's 45.8%.

During the 2017 general election campaign, it emerged that the Greens had been offered £250,000 to not stand in the by-election, although the party did not take up the offer and denied it had influenced their decision.

== Opinion polling ==
=== Before close of nominations ===
This poll was conducted before nominations for the by-election closed and therefore includes two parties that opted not to stand: the Greens, who supported Sarah Olney, the Liberal Democrat candidate, and UKIP, who supported Zac Goldsmith.

Poll source	Date(s) administered	Sample size	Goldsmith	Olney	Con	Lab	Grn	UKIP	Other
BMG Research/The Evening Standard	26–27 October 2016	543 Richmond; Park residents	56%	29%	–	11%	2%	2%	0%
BMG Research/The Evening Standard	26–27 October 2016	543 Richmond; Park residents	34%	24%	20%	11%	5%	3%	1%

=== Following close of nominations ===
After the close of nominations, the only opinion polls released publicly were internal polls commissioned by the Liberal Democrats and shared with The Guardian.

Poll source	Date(s) administered	Sample size	Goldsmith	Olney	Wolmar
Liberal Democrat internal	30 November 2016	Unknown	45.8%	47.2%	6.2%
Liberal Democrat internal	26 November 2016	Unknown	46.7%	43.3%	9.5%

== Result ==
By-election 2016: Richmond Park
Party	Candidate	Votes	%	±%
Liberal Democrats	Sarah Olney	20,510	49.68	+30.41
Independent	Zac Goldsmith	18,638	45.15	−13.06
Labour	Christian Wolmar	1,515	3.67	−8.67
Monster Raving Loony	Howling Laud Hope	184	0.45	New
Independent	Fiona Syms	173	0.42	New
CPA	Dominic Stockford	164	0.40	New
One Love	Maharaja Jammu and Kashmir	67	0.16	New
No label	David Powell	32	0.08	New
Majority		1,872	4.53	N/A
Turnout		41,283	53.44	−23.01
Liberal Democrats gain from Conservative		Swing	+21.73 (Note: Calculated on the basis of the vote share for Zac Goldsmith as a Conservative at the previous election and as an independent at this election.)	

This was the first time the Liberal Democrats had gained a seat in a House of Commons by-election since the 2006 Dunfermline and West Fife by-election, and their first gain from the Conservatives since the 2000 Romsey by-election. It was also the largest increase in vote share they had obtained in a by-election since the 1993 Christchurch by-election.

Six months later, Zac Goldsmith regained the seat in the 2017 general election by 45 votes. Olney would again defeat Goldsmith in the 2019 general election.

== Previous results ==
=== 2015 general election ===
General election 2015: Richmond Park
Party	Candidate	Votes	%	±%
Conservative	Zac Goldsmith	34,404	58.21	+8.5
Liberal Democrats	Robin Meltzer	11,389	19.27	−23.5
Labour	Sachin Patel	7,296	12.34	+7.3
Green	Andrée Frieze	3,548	6.00	+5.0
UKIP	Sam Naz	2,464	4.17	+3.0
Majority		23,015	38.94	+32.0
Turnout		59,101	76.5	−0.4
Conservative hold		Swing	+16.0	

=== 2016 EU referendum result ===
The results in the EU referendum on 23 June 2016 were reported by local authority, and, as the constituency consists of parts of two local authorities, the London Borough of Richmond upon Thames and the Royal Borough of Kingston upon Thames, the exact referendum vote in Richmond Park is not known. However, Chris Hanretty, a reader in politics at the University of East Anglia, estimated through a demographic model that Richmond Park had one of the dozen lowest leave votes in the entire country. His latest estimates suggest that 27.7% of Richmond Park voters voted leave, and thus that 72.3% voted remain.

== See also ==
- List of United Kingdom by-elections (2010–present)
