= Jeremy Hanley =

English politician (1945–2026)

The Right Honourable Sir Jeremy Hanley KCMG

Minister of State for Foreign and Commonwealth Affairs
- In office 5 July 1995 – 2 May 1997
- Prime Minister: John Major
- Preceded by: Alastair Goodlad
- Succeeded by: Tony Lloyd

Chairman of the Conservative Party Minister without Portfolio
- In office 20 July 1994 – 5 July 1995
- Leader: John Major
- Preceded by: Norman Fowler
- Succeeded by: Brian Mawhinney

Minister of State for the Armed Forces
- In office 27 May 1993 – 20 July 1994
- Prime Minister: John Major
- Preceded by: Archie Hamilton
- Succeeded by: Nicholas Soames

Member of Parliament for Richmond and Barnes
- In office 9 June 1983 – 8 April 1997
- Preceded by: Constituency created
- Succeeded by: Constituency abolished

Personal details
- Born: Jeremy James Hanley; 17 November 1945 Amersham, Buckinghamshire
- Died: 22 May 2026 (aged 80) Torquay, England
- Party: Conservative
- Spouse: Verna Villiers (m. 1973)
- Children: 2
- Parent(s): Jimmy Hanley; Dinah Sheridan
- Relatives: Jenny Hanley (sister)

Sir Jeremy James Hanley (17 November 1945 – 22 May 2026) was an English politician. He served as the Chairman of the Conservative Party from 1994 to 1995 and was member of parliament (MP) representing the constituency of Richmond and Barnes from 1983 to 1997. By profession Hanley was an accountant.

== Early life and career ==
Hanley was educated at Rugby School and began his career with Peat Marwick Mitchell & Company (now KPMG) as an articled clerk in 1963. He qualified as a chartered accountant in 1969 and as a Chartered Certified Accountant and chartered secretary in 1980. He joined the Financial Training Company, responsible for training chartered accountants, and rose to become the organisation's deputy chairman.

He stood unsuccessfully as the Conservative Party candidate in the 1978 Lambeth Central by-election and for the same seat in the general election the following year, before becoming the MP for Richmond and Barnes at the 1983 general election, narrowly defeating the SDP–Liberal Alliance candidate Alan Watson. On his first day in the House of Commons he ended up sitting next to Northern Ireland MP Ian Paisley and introduced himself saying: "How do you do? I did not realise that you were on our side", to which Paisley replied: "Never confuse sitting on your side with being on your side."

Hanley was the Parliamentary Private Secretary (PPS) to Richard Luce from 1987 to 1990 and briefly to Chris Patten. He became an Under-Secretary of State at the Northern Ireland Office in 1990 and a Minister of State at the Ministry of Defence in 1993.

In 1994, Hanley was brought into the Cabinet by Prime Minister John Major, who made him the Chairman of the Conservative Party and a minister without portfolio. As party chairman he earned a reputation for being prone to gaffes. In the 1995 Cabinet reshuffle Hanley was moved to the non-cabinet role of Minister of State at the Foreign Office, where he remained until the 1997 general election.

His Richmond and Barnes constituency was abolished as part of a redrawing of constituency boundaries ahead of the 1997 election. He stood as the Conservative candidate for the new constituency of Richmond Park, but was defeated by the Liberal Democrat candidate Jenny Tonge.

After leaving politics, Hanley served on a number of company boards and as a director of the Arab-British Chamber of Commerce.

== Personal life and death ==
Hanley was the son of actors Jimmy Hanley and Dinah Sheridan. His sister, Jenny Hanley, became an actress and television presenter in the 1970s. In 1983 he appeared alongside Jenny in a celebrity special of Family Fortunes. In 1973 he married Verna, Viscountess Villiers, (née Stott, former wife of George Henry Child Villiers, Viscount Villiers, d. 1998) and had one son. He also had one son by a previous marriage and one step daughter.

He was a member of Mensa.

Hanley died on 22 May 2026, aged 80.

== Honours ==
Hanley was made a member of the Privy Council in 1994. Hanley was awarded a knighthood in John Major's resignation honours list in 1997. He was also a Freeman of the City of London and Master of the Worshipful Company of Chartered Accountants.

== Sources ==
- Times Guide to the House of Commons (1997)

Parliament of the United Kingdom
New constituency	Member of Parliament for Richmond and Barnes; 1983–1997	Constituency abolished
Party political offices
Preceded by Norman Fowler	Chairman of the Conservative Party; 1994–1995	Succeeded by Brian Mawhinney
Political offices
Preceded by Norman Fowler	Minister without Portfolio; 1994–1995	Succeeded by Brian Mawhinney
