= Minister of State for International Environment =

British Government diplomacy position

- Royal Arms of His Majesty's Government
- Incumbent; Vacant since 25 October 2022
- Department for Environment, Food and Rural Affairs
- Reports to: Secretary of State for Environment, Food and Rural Affairs
- Nominator: Prime Minister of the United Kingdom
- Appointer: The King (on the advice of the Prime Minister)
- Term length: At His Majesty's pleasure
- Formation: 2019
- First holder: Zac Goldsmith

The minister of state for international environment is a junior ministerial position in the Department for Environment, Food and Rural Affairs. It is currently vacant since October 2022.

== Responsibilities ==
The minister’s responsibilities include:

- International environment, climate, biodiversity and conservation
- Animal Welfare
- Forestry policy – domestic and international
- International Whaling Commission
- International ocean (including ocean and climate, marine biodiversity (including overseas territories marine biodiversity), marine litter and blue finance)
- Illegal wildlife trade, Corridors, Kaza
- Green recovery
- International green finance
- Lead for Forestry Commission
- Lords Minister for environment, including Environment Bill

== List of ministers ==
Name	Portrait	Term of office		Political party	P.M.
Parliamentary Under-Secretary of State for Environment and International Development
Zac Goldsmith, Baron Goldsmith of Richmond Park		13 July 2019	13 February 2020	Conservative	Johnson
Minister of State for the Pacific and the International Environment
Zac Goldsmith, Baron Goldsmith of Richmond Park		13 February 2020	15 September 2022	Conservative	Johnson
Parliamentary Under-Secretary of State for International Environment
Richard Benyon, Baron Benyon		20 September 2022	31 October 2022	Conservative	Truss

== See also ==
- Department for Environment, Food and Rural Affairs
- Secretary of State for Environment, Food and Rural Affairs
- Minister of State for Food
- Parliamentary Under-Secretary of State for Growth and Rural Affairs
