= Fitzdares =

British bookmaker based in London

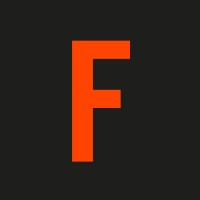
- Formation: 17 March 2006; 20 years ago
- Founder: Balthazar Fabricius
- Headquarters: London
- Services: Bookmaking; Sports betting; Online gambling
- Key people: Zac Goldsmith; Ben Goldsmith
- Website: Homepage

Fitzdares is a British bookmaker established in 2006 by Balthazar Fabricius, with financial backing from Zac Goldsmith, Ben Goldsmith and James Osborne.

== History ==
Fitzdares' founder Fabricius worked in the different departments of Ladbrokes' betting business for three and a half years after qualifying for their graduate scheme.

In 2005, Fabricius approached Zac and Ben Goldsmith with his idea, proposing a bookmaker that would emphasise exclusivity and personal relationships. At the time, the majority of large bookmakers were moving their operations online, and Fabricius felt that a high-spending minority of sports fans would favour a upmarket bookmaker over a mass-market betting shop. The Goldsmiths liked the idea and backed it financially. Fitzdares obtained its gambling license in December 2005 and became operational in March 2006.

In 2016, Fitzdares acquired telephone bookmaker Sunderlands, who had previously bought T Guntrip, dating back to 1882. Fitzdares appointed William Woodhams as its CEO in 2018. Previously, Woodhams had worked for the French luxury goods conglomerate Moët Hennessy Louis Vuitton and a marketing consultancy advising other luxury brands. Since Woodhams' appointment the company launched a sports betting app.

In 2020, Fitzdares opened a private sports and betting venue on Davies Street, London's Mayfair area. The club served approximately 2,000 members.
