= John Naisbitt =

American business writer (1929–2021)

- Born: January 15, 1929; Salt Lake City, Utah, U.S.
- Died: April 8, 2021 (aged 92); Velden am Wörther See, Austria
- Education: Harvard University; Cornell University; University of Utah
- Occupations: Author; public speaker; academic
- Spouse: Doris Naisbitt
- Writing career
- Subject: Futures studies

John Naisbitt (January 15, 1929 – April 8, 2021) was an American author and public speaker in the area of futures studies. His first book Megatrends: Ten New Directions Transforming Our Lives was published in 1982. It was the result of almost ten years of research. It was on The New York Times Best Seller list for two years, mostly as No. 1. Megatrends was published in 57 countries and sold more than 14 million copies.

== Biography ==
John Naisbitt grew up in Glenwood, Utah and studied at Harvard, Cornell and Utah universities. He gained business experience working for IBM and Eastman Kodak. In the world of politics he was assistant to the Commissioner of Education under President John F. Kennedy and served as special assistant to HEW Secretary John Gardner during the Johnson administration. He left Washington in 1966 and joined Science Research Associates. In 1968, he founded his own company, the Urban Research Corporation. Naisbitt founded the Naisbitt China Institute, a non-profit, independent research institution studying the social, cultural and economic transformation of China located at Tianjin University. In 2009, Naisbitt published China's Megatrends, a book analyzing China's rise.

He was an adviser on agricultural development to the royal government of Thailand, former visiting fellow at Harvard University, visiting professor at Moscow State University, faculty member at Nanjing University in China, distinguished International Fellow at the Institute of Strategic and International Studies, Malaysia (the first non-Asian to hold this appointment), professor at Nankai University, Tianjin University of Finance and Economics, and a member of the advisory Board of the Asia Business School, Tianjin. He was also the recipient of 15 honorary doctorates in the humanities, technology and science. John Naisbitt and his wife Doris were based in Vienna and Tianjin.

Naisbitt died on April 8, 2021, at his secondary residence in Velden am Wörther See, Austria.

== Bibliography ==
- Megatrends: Ten New Directions Transforming Our Lives. Warner Books, 1982
- (with Patricia Aburdene) Reinventing the Corporation: Transforming Your Job and Your Company for the New Information Society. Warner Books, 1985
- (with Patricia Aburdene) Megatrends 2000: Ten New Directions for the 1990s. William Morrow & Company, Inc., 1990
- Global Paradox: The Bigger the World Economy, the More Powerful Its Smallest Players. William Morrow & Company, Inc., 1994
- Megatrends Asia: Eight Asian Megatrends That Are Reshaping Our World. Simon & Schuster, 1996
- High Tech High Touch: Technology and Our Accelerated Search for Meaning. Broadway Books, 1999
- Mind Set!: Reset Your Thinking and See the Future. Collins, 2006.
- China's Megatrends: The 8 Pillars of a New Society. HarperCollins, 2010.

== See also ==
- High-touch
- Megatrend
