= Megatrend =

Trends that have an effect on a global scale

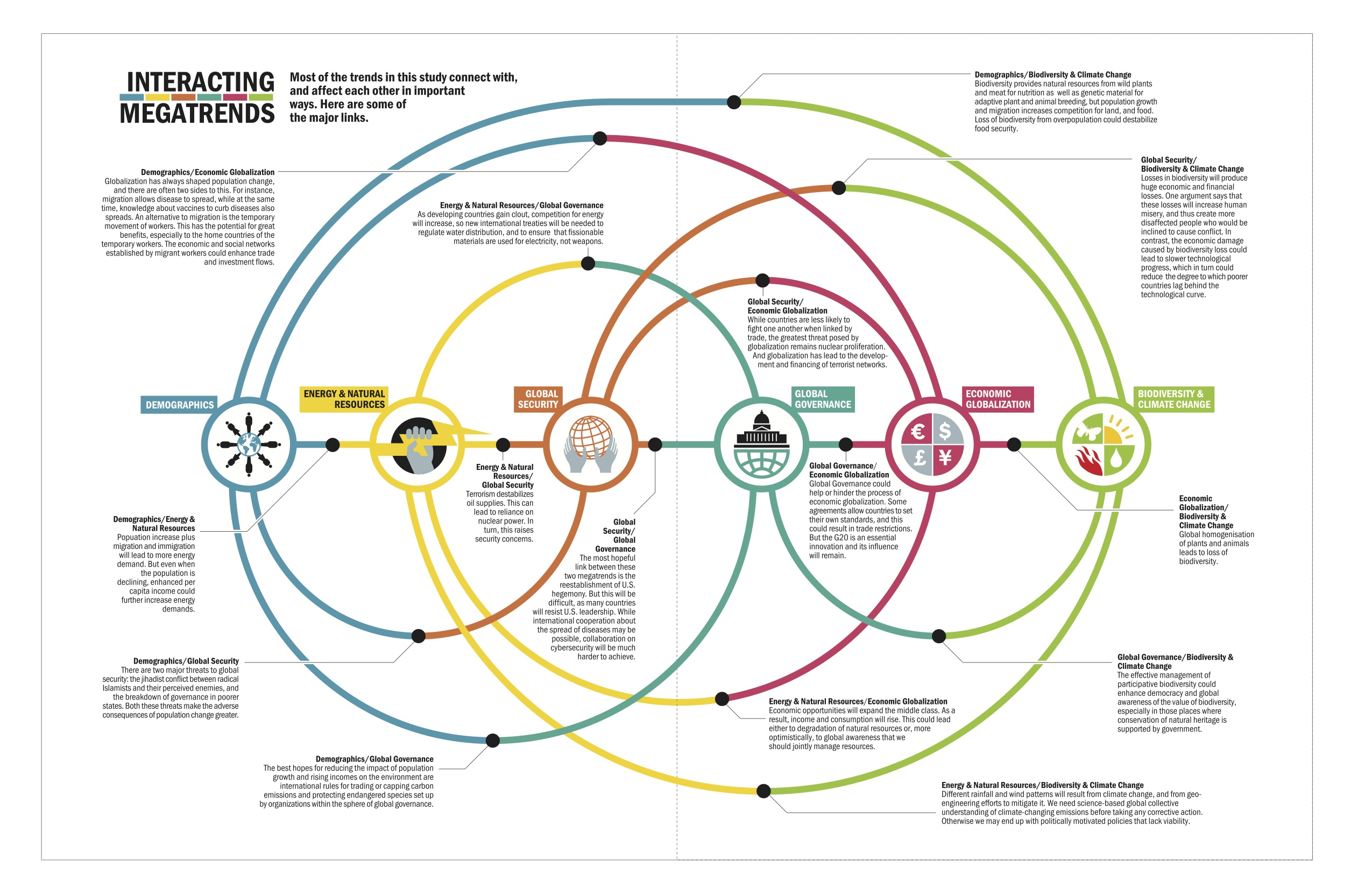
Megatrends and how they interconnect

Megatrends are trends that have effects on a global scale. Some of the current megatrends relate to global threats.

Megatrends strongly influence different spheres of life in many countries and at different levels, covering political, economic, natural environmental, social, and cultural dimensions. A megatrend is different from a shortlived product or consumer trend.

John Naisbitt was a pioneer of futures studies. His book Megatrends: Ten New Directions Transforming Our Lives was first published in 1982. It focused mainly on the United States but also attempted to present a global outlook. Naisbitt accurately predicted the change from industrialized to information societies.

A growing number of research institutions, international organizations, and think tanks are reflecting on megatrends with the purpose of engaging in dialogue and influence policymaking and investments.

== Criteria ==
Kuhn and Margellos proposed a framework to identify and prioritize megatrends which focuses on five criteria relating to the relevance of trends. The five key criteria are the following:

1. Research coverage of the trend by researchers and analysts from different disciplinary backgrounds in different countries and regions.
2. Level of political attention for the trend in a significant number of countries and regions.
3. Significant interest from global investors. This acknowledges that investments have great potential to promote trends.
4. Media coverage of the trend. This refers to traditional media and social media.
5. Strength of social movements and advocacy actions related to the trend. These factors represent different spheres of societies: scientific and research, state, and government institutions; financial and business sectors; media; and civil society.

== Identified megatrends ==
Kuhn and Margellos interviewed researchers and experts from more than 30 countries to prioritize megatrends, resulting in the following megatrends:

- Climate action and sustainability
- Digitalization
- Inequality
- Demography
- Urbanization and smart cities
- Health and nutrition
- Green economy
- Sustainable finance
- Multipolar world order and the future of multilateralism
- Democracy and governance innovations
- Civilizational developments: Diversity, individualization and loneliness, gender shift, and identity politics
- Migration

The identification and analysis of megatrends rely on the disciplinary and professional perspectives of researchers and experts, as well as the specific country or region upon which their analysis is focused.

== Economic implications ==
Economically, megatrends can be exploited by enterprises to make profit. At least 7 megatrends have been identified by multinational investment and professional services companies:

- Technological progress, esp. in the internet domain
- Demographic change and social change
- Rapid global urbanization
- Climate change and resource depletion
- Emerging markets
- The impact of deepfakes and other synthetic media
- Microbiomes and synthetic biology
