= Derek Gow =

UK based reintroduction expert and author

Derek Gow (born 29 June 1965) is a UK-based reintroduction expert, farmer and author known for his work with watervoles, white storks, wildcats, and Eurasian beavers.

He also imported the first Heck cattle to the UK. However, after aggressive behaviour could harm or even kill handlers, a significant proportion of the herd was culled.

Born in Dundee, he left school when he was 17 and worked in agriculture for five years. Inspired by the writing of Gerald Durrell, he jumped at the chance to manage a European wildlife park in central Scotland in the late 1990s before moving on to develop two nature centres in England. Gow owns a 400 acre farm (Rewilding Coombeshead) in Lifton, Devon, which is home to captive breeding facilities for native flora and fauna, visitor accommodation and a working farm. Much of the land is under the process of rewilding, like the Knepp Estate. The farm is home to many species, including Eurasian lynx, wild boar, beavers, white storks, black storks, common tree frogs, and harvest mice.

The relationship between Gow and a neighbouring farmer, also called Derek (Banbury), is the subject of the documentary Derek Vs Derek, directed by James Dawson.

== Books ==
- Gow, Derek (2022). Bringing Back the Beaver: The Story of One Man's Quest to Rewild Britain's Waterways. Chelsea Green Publishing UK. ISBN 9781645021223.
- Gow, Derek (2022). Birds, Beasts and Bedlam: Turning My Farm Into an Ark For Lost Species. Chelsea Green Publishing UK. ISBN 9781645021339.
- Gow, Derek (2024). Hunt for the Shadow Wolf [US Edition]: The lost history of wolves in Britain and the myths and stories that surround them. Chelsea Green Publishing UK. ISBN 9781915294463.
