= Goldsmith (surname) =

Goldsmith is a variation of the surname Smith. Notable persons with that surname include:

== A ==
- Adrian Goldsmith (1921–1961), Australian flying ace of WWII
- Alfred Norton Goldsmith (1888–1974), American electrical engineer
- Andrea Goldsmith (engineer) (born 1964), American electrical engineer
- Andrea Goldsmith (writer) (born 1950), Australian writer and novelist
- Lady Annabel Goldsmith (1934–2025), English socialite
- Arthur S. Goldsmith (1909–1995), American bridge player

== B ==
- Barbara Goldsmith (1931–2016), American writer
- Ben Goldsmith (born 1980), English financier and environmentalist
- Bernard Goldsmith (1832–1901), mayor of Portland, Oregon
- Bethany Goldsmith (1927–2004), All-American Girls Professional Baseball League player
- Bobby Goldsmith (1946–1984), Australian athlete, gay activist, and AIDS victim
- Bruce Goldsmith, British paraglider pilot and designer

== C ==
- Carol Goldsmith, American news anchor
- Carole Goldsmith aka Carole Middleton (born 1955), British businesswoman, mother of Catherine, Princess of Wales
- Caroline Goldsmith (1925– 2004) American arts promoter
- Cele Goldsmith Lalli (1933–2002), American editor
- Christy Goldsmith Romero, American lawyer, Special Inspector General of the Troubled Asset Relief Program
- Clio Goldsmith (born 1957), French actress

== D ==
- David Goldsmith (actor) (born 1969), American actor
- David Goldsmith (cricketer) (1947–2023), English cricketer
- David Goldsmith (field hockey) (1931–2017), New Zealander field hockey player
- David Goldsmith (footballer) (born 1993), English footballer and coach
- David Goldsmith (lyricist) (born 1962), American theatre writer and lyricist
- Deborah Goldsmith (1808–1836), American painter

== E ==
- Edward Goldsmith (1928–2009), Anglo-French environmentalist and writer
- Edward Goldsmith (priest) (1662–1722), Irish Anglican priest
- Ella Goldsmith, Australian rugby union referee
- Emmanuel Goldsmith (1909–1990), Swiss sprinter

== F ==
- Fannie P. Goldsmith (died 1931), American politician
- Francis Edward Goldsmith (c. 1820–1875), medical doctor in Northern Territory of Australia under B. T. Finniss
- Frank Goldsmith (1878–1967), British Conservative MP and luxury hotel owner
- Frank John William Goldsmith (1902–1982), British author and Titanic survivor
- Fred Goldsmith (disambiguation)

- Fred Goldsmith (American football) (born 1944), American football coach
- Fred Goldsmith (Australian rules footballer) (1932–2017), Victorian Football League player
- Fred Goldsmith (baseball) (1852–1939), American baseball pitcher

- Frederick Goldsmith (1853–1932), Anglican bishop in Western Australia

== G ==
- Gary Goldsmith (born 1965), English businessman
- George Goldsmith (1905–1974), English footballer
- Glen Goldsmith (born 1965), English singer
- Grace Arabell Goldsmith (1904–1975), American physician

== H ==
- H. Hill Goldsmith, American developmental psychologist
- Harold Goldsmith (1930–2004), American foil and épée fencer
- Harvey Goldsmith (born 1946), English concert promoter
- Henry Goldsmith (1885–1915), British rower

== I ==
- Isaac Goldsmith (1706–1769), Irish clergyman
- Isadore Goldsmith (1893–1964), Austrian film producer

== J ==
- Jack L. Goldsmith (born 1962), American legal scholar and author
- Jan Goldsmith (born 1951), American Republican politician; San Diego City Attorney
- Sir James Goldsmith (1933–1997), Anglo-French business tycoon
- Jemima Goldsmith (born 1974), English socialite
- Jerry Goldsmith (1929–2004), American composer
- Jill Goldsmith, American TV writer and producer
- Jo-ann Goldsmith, band member of Canada's Broken Social Scene
- Joel Goldsmith (1957–2012), American film composer, son of Jerry Goldsmith
- Joel S. Goldsmith (1892–1964), American religious leader and author
- John Goldsmith (linguist) (born 1951), American linguistics professor
- John G. Goldsmith (1909–1972), British member of SOE during WWII
- Jonathan Goldsmith (born 1938), American actor
- Jonathan Goldsmith (musician), Canadian composer and musician
- Judy Goldsmith, American feminist academic and activist

== K ==
- Kelly Goldsmith, American marketing researcher
- Kenneth Goldsmith (born 1961), American poet and academic

== L ==
- Larkin Goldsmith Mead (1835–1910), American sculptor
- Lewis Goldsmith (c. 1763–1846), Anglo-French publicist
- Lewis Gerhardt Goldsmith, American sailor
- Lillie Cowen, née Goldsmith (1851–1939), Jewish-American translator
- Luba Robin Goldsmith (1879–1931), American physician
- Luciana Goldsmith, née Berger (born 1981), British Labour politician
- Lynn Goldsmith (born 1948), American recording artist, film director and photographer

== M ==
- Marie Goldsmith (1862–1933), Russian biologist and anarchist
- Mark A. Goldsmith (born 1952), American federal judge in Michigan
- Marshall Goldsmith (born 1949), American author and management consultant
- Martin Goldsmith (footballer) (born 1962), Welsh footballer
- Martin Goldsmith (radio host) (born 1952), American classical music radio host
- Martin Goldsmith (screenwriter) (1913–1994), American screenwriter and novelist

== N ==
- Nancy Goldsmith (born 1966), Israeli Olympic gymnast
- Nick Goldsmith (born 1971), British TV and video producer

== O ==
- Oli Goldsmith, Canadian artist
- Oliver Goldsmith (c. 1730 – 1774), Irish writer and physician
- Oliver Goldsmith (Canadian poet) (1794–1861), Canadian poet
- Oliver Goldsmith (company) eyewear firm founded by P. Oliver Goldsmith (1890–1947)
- Olivia Goldsmith (1949–2004), American novelist

== P ==
- Pamela Goldsmith-Jones (born 1961), Canadian politician
- Paul Goldsmith (racing driver) (1925–2024), American motorcycle and automobile racer
- Paul Goldsmith (politician) (born 1971), New Zealand politician
- Pauline Goldsmith, Northern Irish actress, director and playwright
- Peter Goldsmith, Baron Goldsmith (born 1950), British barrister

== R ==
- Raymond W. Goldsmith (1904–1988), American economist

== S ==
- Saul Goldsmith (1911–1988) New Zealand importer, merchant, and politician
- Sheherazade Goldsmith (born 1974), English environmentalist and author
- Stephen Goldsmith (disambiguation), several people, including:
  - Stephen Goldsmith (born 1946), American politician
  - Steve Goldsmith (cricketer) (born 1964), English cricketer
- Syd Goldsmith (born 1938), American writer

== T ==
- Thomas T. Goldsmith, Jr. (1910–2009), American television and video game pioneer
- Tottie Goldsmith (born 1962), Australian actress and singer

== U ==
- Ulrich K. Goldsmith (1910–2000), American literary scholar

== V ==
- Vince Goldsmith (born 1959), Canadian Football League player

== W ==
- Wally Goldsmith (1849–1915), American professional baseball player
- William Goldsmith (born 1972), American rock drummer

== Z ==
- Zac Goldsmith (born 1975), British Conservative life peer, environmentalist and former MP

== See also ==
- Goldsmith (disambiguation)
- Goldschmid
- Goldschmidt
- Goldschmied
- Goldschmitt
- Goldsmid (name)
- Gouldsmith
- Aurifaber
