= Goldsmith (disambiguation) =

A goldsmith is a metalworker who specializes in working with gold.

Goldsmith may also refer to:

== Places ==
- Goldsmith C. Gilbert Historic District in Muncie, Indiana, United States
- Goldsmith, Indiana, United States
- Goldsmith, New York, United States, a hamlet
- Goldsmith, Texas, United States, a city
- Goldsmith Lake, Cleveland Township, Le Sueur County, Minnesota, United States
- Goldsmith Channel, a waterway in the Canadian territory of Nunavut
- Goldsmith Glacier, Theron Mountains, Antarctica

== People ==
- Goldsmith (surname)
- Goldsmith Bailey (1823–1862), U.S. Representative from Massachusetts
- Goldsmith Goldie Collins (1901–1982), Australian rules footballer
- Goldsmith W. Hewitt (1834–1895), U.S. Representative from Alabama

== Prizes ==
- Goldsmiths Prize, a UK-based book award
- Goldsmith Book Prize, a US-based press, politics, and public policy book award
- Goldsmith Prize for Investigative Reporting, an award for journalists at Harvard University

== Other uses ==
- Goldsmiths, University of London, a college in England founded by the Worshipful Company of Goldsmiths
- Goldsmith's, a department store in Memphis, Tennessee
- Goldsmiths (retailer), a jewellery retailer in Ireland and the United Kingdom
- Goldsmith Block, an historic apartment building in Boston, Massachusetts
- Goldsmith Hall, a building on the University of Texas at Austin campus
- Goldsmith Defense, an uncommon chess opening
- Goldsmith, a character in the visual novel Umineko no Naku Koro ni

== See also ==
- Goldsmiths' Professor of Materials Science, professorship in the University of Cambridge
- Worshipful Company of Goldsmiths, one of the Great Twelve Livery Companies of the City of London

== Variations on surname ==
- Goldsmith (surname)
- Goldschmidt family
- Goldschmidt
- Goldschmid
- Goldschmied
- Goldschmitt
- Goldsmid (name)
- Aurifaber
