= Goldschmidt =

Goldschmidt is a German surname meaning "Goldsmith". Notable people with the surname include:

- Adalbert von Goldschmidt (1848–1906), composer
- Adolph Goldschmidt (1863–1944), art historian
- Adolphe Goldschmidt (1838–1918), German-British banker
- Alfons Goldschmidt (1879–1940), German journalist, economist and university lecturer
- Arnd Goldschmidt (born 1981), German flatwater canoer
- Berthold Goldschmidt (1903–1996), composer
- Carl Wolfgang Benjamin Goldschmidt (1807–1851), astronomer, mathematician, and physicist
- Christina Goldschmidt, British statistician
- David M. Goldschmidt (born 1942), American mathematician
- Edmond Goldschmidt (1863–1934), French photographer
- Elisabeth Goldschmidt (1912–1970), Israeli geneticist
- Ernst Philip Goldschmidt (1887–1954), Austrian-British bookseller and bibliophile
- Georges-Arthur Goldschmidt (born 1928), French writer and translator of German origin
- Hans Goldschmidt (1861–1923), chemist, son of Theodor Goldschmidt
- Harold Goldsmith, born Hans Goldschmidt (1930–2004), American Olympic foil and épée fencer
- Heinrich Jacob Goldschmidt (1857–1937), Austrian chemist, father of Victor Moritz Goldschmidt, founder of modern geochemistry
- Hermann Goldschmidt (1802–1866), astronomer and painter
- Hilde Goldschmidt (1897–1980), artist
- Jakob Goldschmidt (1882–1955), German banker
- John Goldschmidt (1943–2025), British-Austrian film director and producer
- Lazarus Goldschmidt (1871–1950), German writer and translator
- Levin Goldschmidt (1829–1897), jurist
- Márcia Goldschmidt (born 1962), Brazilian TV presenter
- Marie Goldschmidt (1890–1917), French aeronaut
- Meïr Aaron Goldschmidt (1819–1887), publisher and writer
- Neil Goldschmidt (born 1940), U.S. politician
- Nicholas Goldschmidt (1908–2004), conductor, artistic director
- Otto Goldschmidt (1829–1907), German composer
- Pascal Goldschmidt (–), cardiologist, and dean of University of Miami School of Medicine
- Paul Goldschmidt (born 1987), American baseball player
- Pinchas Goldschmidt (born 1963), Chief Rabbi of Moscow and President of the CER
- Richard Benedikt Goldschmidt (1878–1958), geneticist
- Robert Goldschmidt (1877–1935), Belgian physicist
- Rudolf Goldschmidt (1876–1950), engineer and inventor
- Samuel Goldschmidt (1869–1940), German banker, died in exile
- Sandra Goldschmidt (born 1976), German trade unionist
- Siegfried Goldschmidt (1844–1884), German Indologist
- Theodor Goldschmidt (1817–1875), chemist
- Tijs Goldschmidt (born 1953), Dutch writer and evolutionary biologist
- Tobias Goldschmidt (born 1981), German politician
- Victor Mordechai Goldschmidt (1853–1933), chemist
- Victor Moritz Goldschmidt (1888–1947), geochemist, considered the founder of modern geochemistry. Son of Heinrich Jacob Goldschmidt, Austrian chemist
- Victor Goldschmidt (philosopher) (1914–1981), French historian of philosophy
- Walter Goldschmidt (1913–2010), American anthropologist and academic

== Similar names ==
- Goldschmidt family
- Goldschmid
- Goldschmied
- Goldschmitt
- Goldsmid
- Goldsmith
- Aurifaber

== Geochemistry ==
- Goldschmidt classification (geochemistry)
- Goldschmidt tolerance factor (geochemistry)
- V. M. Goldschmidt Award, American science award in geochemistry
