= Goldsmid =

Goldsmid may refer to:

- Goldsmid (name), German surname
- Goldsmid family, family of bankers
- Goldsmid baronets, extinct baronetcy in the Baronetage of the United Kingdom
- Goldsmid (ward), electoral ward in Hove, England

== See also ==
- Goldschmidt
- Goldsmith (disambiguation)
