= Abnoba mons =

The Latin name Abnoba Mons (Pre-Germanic Abnoba; Ancient Greek τὰ Ἄβνοβα, ta Abnoba, Ἀβνοβαῖα ὄρη Abnobaia orē) is the name of a mountain range that was already known to ancient authors Pliny and Tacitus. The name has been traditionally, primarily associated in historical research with the Black Forest. Ptolemy, in his A.D. 150 publication, Geographia, mentioned among the mountains of Germania (τὴν Γερμιανίαν ὁρέων) these mountains called Abnoba (καλούμενα Ἄβνοβα) (a neutral plural) on 31° east, extending from 49° north to 52° north. His co-ordinates cannot be converted directly. Mount Adula near the source of the Rhine is placed by him on 29°30'E, 45°15'N, Brigantion Βριγάντιον (Bregenz) on 30°E, 46°N, "at the head of River Rhine" Πρὸς δὲ τῇ κεφαλῇ τοῦ Ῥήνου ποταμοῦ (Lake Constance) extending westward to Taxgaetium Ταξγαίτιον (really Tasgetium, nowadays Eschenz) 29°20'E, 46°15'N. His Augusta Rauricorum Αὐγούστα Ραυρικῶν (Kaiseraugst, on the south bank of the High Rhine, opposite of the Black Forest) is on 28°E, 47°50'N, Argentoratum Ἀργεντόρατον (Strasbourg) on 27°30' or 27°50'E, 48°45' or 48°50'N, Borbetomagus Βορβητόμαγος (Worms), 27°50'E, northernmost 49°20'N, Veter(r)a Οὐέτερρα, Xanten (88 km north west of Cologne) on 27° or 27,30°E, 51,50°N. His "head of the Danube", probably the junction of its sources Breg and Brigach, is on 30°E, 46,33°N. According to these relations, Ptolemy's "Abnoba Montains" comprised several different highlands, from the Odenwald to northern Hesse, but the real Black Forest only partly.

== Literature ==
- Maximilian Ihm: "Abnoba" (in German). In: Realencyclopädie der classischen Altertumswissenschaft (RE). Vol. I,1, Stuttgart, 1893, col. 104.
- Werner Heinz, Rainer Wiegels: Der Diana Abnoba Altar in Badenweiler. In: Antike Welt 13/4. 1982, S. 37–43.
- Reinhard Wenskus: Abnoba. In the Lexicon of Germanic Antiquity Studies (Reallexikon der Germanischen Altertumskunde) (RGA). 2nd edition, Vol. 1, Walter de Gruyter, Berlin/New York 1973, p(p). 13. (online)
- Alfred Stückelberger, Gerd Graßhoff, ed. (2006), Ptolemaios, Handbuch der Geographie (Griechisch-Deutsch) (in German), Basel: Schwabe Verlag, ISBN 3-7965-2148-7 S. ?.
- Gerhard Rasch (2005), Stefan Zimmer (ed.), "Antike geographische Namen nördlich der Alpen. Mit einem Beitrag von Hermann Reichert: Germanien in der Sicht des Ptolemaios", Reallexikon der Germanischen Altertumskunde: Ergänzungsbände (in German), no. 47, Berlin: de Gruyter
- Corinna Scheungraber, Friedrich E. Grünzweig: Die altgermanischen Toponyme sowie ungermanische Toponyme Germaniens. Ein Handbuch zu ihrer Etymologie unter Benutzung einer Bibliographie von Robert Nedoma. Herausgegeben von Hermann Reichert. (= Philologica Germanica 34) Fassbaender, Wien 2014, ISBN 978-3-902575-62-3, S. 35–37.
- Sabine Ziegler: Bemerkungen zum keltischen Toponym Abnova/Abnoba. In: Historische Sprachforschung 116, 2, 2003, S. 290–294.
