= Siegfried Goldschmidt =

German Indologist (1844–1884)

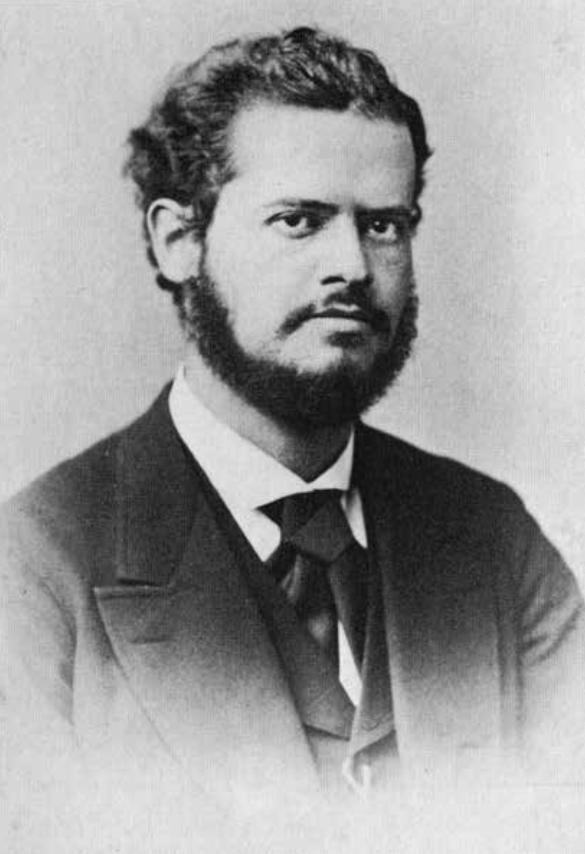
- Born: Siegfried Samson Goldschmidt; 29 October 1844; Cassel, Hesse, German Confederation
- Died: 31 January 1884 (aged 39); Strasburg, Alsace–Lorraine, German Empire
- Burial place: Kassel Jewish Cemetery
- Spouse: Anna Meyer

Academic background
- Education: University of Tübingen
- Thesis: Der VII^{te} Prapâṭhaka des Sâmaveda-Ârcika in der Naigeya-Çakhâ Nebst Andern Mitteilungen über Dieselbe (1868)
- Doctoral advisor: Rudolf von Roth

Academic work
- Discipline: Indology
- Institutions: University of Strasburg

Siegfried Samson Goldschmidt (29 October 1844 – 31 January 1884) was a German Indologist. His interest was centered upon Prakrit grammar and vocabulary, and his articles formed valuable contributions to the investigation of middle Indo-Aryan languages.

== Biography ==
Siegfried Goldschmidt was born in Cassel, Germany, the youngest child of Jewish court banker Philipp Samson Goldschmidt and his wife Minna (née Hertz). After Philipp's death in 1846, Goldschmidt's mother married Jeremias Rothfels, with whom she had one child, lawyer Max Rothfels (father of Hans Rothfels).

Goldschmidt was educated at the gymnasium in Cassel, before studying philosophy and (mostly Sanskrit) philology the Universities of Leipzig, Berlin, and Tübingen, graduating with a Ph.D. on 20 August 1867. His doctor's dissertation, "Der VII^{te} Prapâṭhaka des Sâmaveda-Ârcika in der Naigeya-Çakhâ Nebst Andern Mitteilungen über Dieselbe", published in the Monatsberichte der Königlichen Preussischen Akademie der Wissenschaften (1868, pp. 228–248), was an edition of the single portion which has been preserved of the Kâuthuma recension of the Samaveda. Goldschmidt continued his studies, first at Göttingen and later in Paris, where he gained a thorough mastery of the French language.

On the outbreak of the Franco-Prussian War he returned to Germany and volunteered for military service. He took part in the Siege of Paris. At the close of the war Goldschmidt was appointed assistant professor in the newly Germanified University of Strasburg, with which he was connected during the remainder of his short life. He became professor on 12 September 1881, but soon had to discontinue his teaching activities as a result of spinal tuberculosis, which he contracted the previous summer. The illness progressed slowly until his death on 31 January 1884 at the age of 39.

== Work ==
Siegfried Goldschmidt published only fourteen academic studies, mostly short notes in Kuhn's Zeitschrift für Vergleichende Sprachforschung and the Zeitschrift der Deutschen Morgenländischen Gesellschaft. His most important work was his edition of the great Prakrit poem ascribed to Kâlidâsa, the Sêtubandhu ('Building of the Bridge') or Râvaṇavaha ('Death of Ravana'), which describes the construction of a bridge of boats across the Vitasta by a king of Kashmir. This is in two volumes, the first of which comprises the text and an index of the Prakrit words, in preparing which Siegfried was assisted by his brother Paul, while the second part contains the German translation. The only other book published by this scholar was a volume of Prâkṛtica, containing grammatical studies on Prakrit.

== Selected publications ==
- Goldschmidt, Siegfried (1868). "Der VII^{te} Prapâṭhaka des Sâmaveda-Ârcika in der Naigeya-Çâkhâ nebst andern Mitteilungen über dieselbe". Monatsberichte der Königlichen Preussischen Akademie der Wissenschaften (in German): 228–248.
- —————————— (1879). Prâkṛtica (in German). Strasbourg: Verlag von Karl J. Trübner.
- —————————— (1880). Rāvaṇavaha oder Setubandha (in German). Vol. 1. Strasbourg: Verlag von Karl J. Trübner.
- —————————— (1884). Rāvaṇavaha oder Setubandha (in German). Vol. 2. Strasbourg: Verlag von Karl J. Trübner.
