= Goldsmith Prize =

Goldsmith Prize may refer to:

- Goldsmith Book Prize, a US-based press, politics, and public policy book award
- Goldsmith Prize for Investigative Reporting, an award for journalists at Harvard University
- Goldsmiths Prize, a UK-based book award

== See also ==
- Goldman Environmental Prize
- Goldsmith (disambiguation)
