= Mante =

Mante may refer to:

- Mante, formally Ciudad Mante, a city in the Mexican state of Tamaulipas
- Harald Mante (born 1936), German photographer
- Louis Amédée Mante (1826–1913), French photographer and inventor
- Thomas Mante (c. 1733 – c. 1802), English army officer, historian, military writer and French spy
- La Mante, 2017 French TV series
