= David Goldsmith =

David Goldsmith may refer to:

- David Goldsmith (cricketer) (1947–2023), English cricketer
- David Goldsmith (footballer) (born 1993), English footballer
- David Goldsmith (field hockey) (1931–2017), New Zealand field hockey player
- David Goldsmith (actor) (born 1969), American actor
- David Goldsmith (lyricist) (born 1962), American theatre and film music lyricist
