= Edward Goldsmith (priest) =

Irish Anglican priest (1662–1722)

Edward Goldmith (1662–1722) was an Irish Anglican priest in the 17th century.

Goldsmith was educated at Trinity College, Dublin. He was ordained on 17 May 1664 and held livings at Ardcarne, Eastersnow and Kilmactrany. Goldsmith was Prebendary of Rasharkin in Lisburn Cathedral from 1692 until 1700. He was Dean of Elphin from 1700 until his death.

His first cousin Robert Goldsmith was paternal grandfather of the poet Oliver Goldsmith; and his son Isaac Dean of Cloyne from 1736 to 1769.
