= Franz Felix Adalbert Kuhn =

German philologist and folklorist (1812–1881)

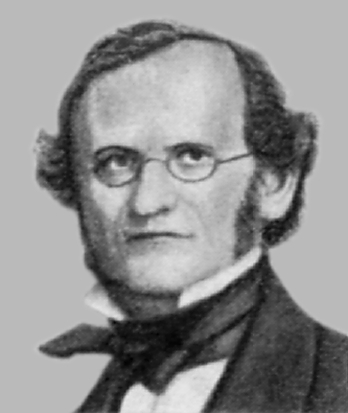
- Born: 19 November 1812; Königsberg, Brandenburg
- Died: 5 May 1881 (aged 68); Berlin, German Empire

Franz Felix Adalbert Kuhn (19 November 1812 – 5 May 1881) was a German philologist and folklorist.

Kuhn was born in Königsberg in Brandenburg's Neumark region. From 1841, he was connected with the Köllnisches Gymnasium at Berlin, of which he was appointed director in 1870. Kuhn was the founder of a new school of comparative mythology, based upon comparative philology. Inspired by Jakob Grimm's Deutsche Mythologie, he first devoted himself to German stories and legends, and published Märkische Sagen und Märchen (1842), Norddeutsche Sagen, Märchen und Gebräuche (1848), and Sagen, Gebräuche und Märchen aus Westfalen (1859).

But it is on Kuhn's researches into the language and history of the Indo-Germanic peoples as a whole that his reputation is founded. His chief works in this connection are Zur ältesten Geschichte der Indogermanischen Völker (1845), in which he endeavoured to give an account of the earliest civilization of the Indo-Germanic peoples before their separation into different families, by comparing and analysing the original meaning of the words and stems common to the different languages; Die Herabkunft des Feuers und des Göttertranks (1859; new edition by Ernst Kuhn, under title of Mythologische Studien, 1886); and Über Entwicklungsstufen der Mythenbildung (1873), in which he maintained that the origin of myths was to be looked for in the domain of language, and that their most essential factors were polysemy and homonymy. Kuhn was also the editor of the Zeitschrift für vergleichende Sprachforschung auf dem Gebiete der Indogermanischen Sprachen, which was at his time the standard periodical on the subject.

Kuhn died in Berlin. See obituary notice by C. F. H. Bruchmann in Bursian's Biographisches Jahrbuch (1881) and J. Schmidt in the above Zeitschrift, xxvi. n.s. 6.
