= Queen of Nations =

United Kingdom merchant ship

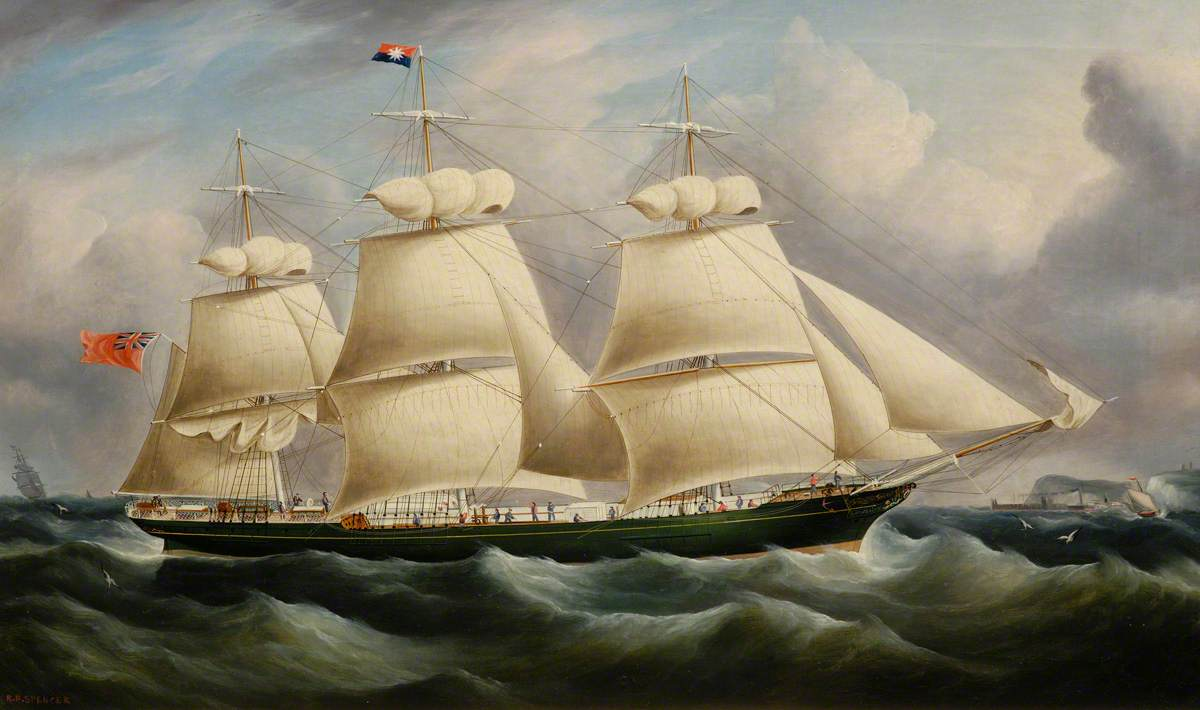
- Queen of Nations by Richard Ball Spencer

History

United Kingdom
- Name: Queen of Nations
- Owner: George Thompson, Jr
- Operator: Aberdeen White Star Line
- Port of registry: Aberdeen
- Builder: Walter Hood, Aberdeen
- Launched: 25 April 1861
- Identification: UK official number 46915; code letters QDTF
- Fate: Wrecked 1881

General characteristics
- Type: wooden-hulled clipper
- Tonnage: 846 NRT
- Length: 190.0 ft (57.9 m)
- Beam: 32.3 ft (9.8 m)
- Depth: 20.0 ft (6.1 m)
- Decks: 2
- Sail plan: 1861: full-rigged ship; 1875: barque
- Complement: as a barque: 28

Queen of Nations was a wooden-hulled, three-masted clipper that was built in Scotland in 1861 and wrecked on the coast of New South Wales in 1881. She spent her entire two-decade career with George Thompson, Junior's Aberdeen White Star Line.

The wreck of Queen of Nations lies in shallow water just off the beach at Corrimal, New South Wales. The Underwater Cultural Heritage Act 2018 automatically protects the wreck and its contents, as they are more than 75 years old.

== Building ==
Walter Hood & Co built Queen of Nations in Aberdeen, launching her on 25 April 1861. Her registered length was 190.0 ft (57.9 m), her beam was 32.3 ft (9.8 m), her depth was 20.0 ft (6.1 m) and her tonnage was 846 NRT.

Thompson registered her at Aberdeen. Her United Kingdom official number was 46915 and her code letters were QDTF.

== Rig ==
Queen of Nations was built as a full-rigged ship. By 1875, she had been re-rigged as a barque.

== Uncle Sam rescue ==
On 21 August 1879 in the North Atlantic Queen of Nations rescued Captain Lewis Gerhardt Goldsmith and his ailing young wife from their 18.5-foot (5.6 m) lifeboat, Uncle Sam, in which they had been trying to sail around the World. The clipper landed the couple at Liverpool on 3 September.

== Loss ==
On 23 February 1881, Queen of Nations left London for Sydney. She carried 1,500 tons of mixed cargo worth £2,700. It included 500 railway rails, 100 boiler tubes, 250 barrels of cement, 90 casks and 60 quarter-casks of rum, 2,000 cases of brandy and 77 cases of beer. Her Master was Captain Samuel Bache, who had been at sea for 21 years, made 14 previous voyages to Australia, and had previously commanded the Strathdon. Bache spent most of the voyage "hopelessly drunk", and some of the crew said his First Officer, Robert Anderson, did so too.

Queen of Nations approached the New South Wales coast on dead reckoning, as no sights had been possible the day before. In the hours before dawn on Tuesday 31 May 1881, and despite clear visibility, Captain Bache mistook a slag heap fire at a coal mine on Mount Keira for the lighthouse on the south head of Port Jackson. This led him to turn Queen of Nations landward prematurely, running her aground on Corrimal beach opposite the mouth of Towradgi Creek (then called "Towridge"), just north of Wollongong. She hit the shore about 5:30 or 6:00 a.m. Her mainmast collapsed, taking with it her fore topmast.

The wreck was about 300 yards from the shore, and 70 yards from the low water line. One crewman drowned when he tried to swim ashore, although he was wearing a lifejacket. Bache and Anderson refused to leave the ship, and Anderson threatened some of the crew with a loaded revolver. At about 11 a.m. fired a 2-inch (51 mm) hawser ashore via a rocket, but an attempt to operate a breeches buoy on the hawser failed. The line was then used to help a boat from the ship to make for the shore. The hawser broke, but the boat got through the surf, carrying the surviving crew except for Bache and Anderson.

For several hours, Bache and Anderson refused to leave the ship. Late in the afternoon they agreed to join a boat that had put out from the shore carrying a local magistrate and two police officers.

== Salvage ==
Local police and New South Wales Customs sought to prevent looting. By Thursday 16 June, work had started to salvage as much as possible of the cargo. A salvage team threw the barrels of cement overboard on the southern side of the wreck to try to form a breakwater.

On 24 June, the wreck started to break up. On 1 July the remaining part of her foremast collapsed, shortly followed by her mizzen mast. By Saturday 2 July, little remained intact but a part of the ship's stern.

Many of the bottles of brandy came ashore at Bellambi Reef. On Saturday 2 and Sunday 3 July, many members of the public visited the shore. Some looted items of cargo, and between 12 and 20 of them were reported to have got drunk on the beach, "some of them helplessly so". By 4 July, police and customs claimed to have recovered more than 5,000 of the 24,000 bottles of brandy from the cargo.

On 6 July, the insurers sold the wreck and her cargo. The wreck was sold for £110 and her boats for £19. Wreckage and part of the cargo were strewn over the beach. The NSW Collector of Customs, as Receiver of Wreck, tried to take charge of the salvaged cargo. But the shipping agents and the disputed this, and demanded that any cargo salvaged be delivered to its intended recipients. The Colonial Treasurer, James Watson, found in favour of the agents.

== Inquiry ==
Also on 16 June, The New South Wales Marine Board held an inquiry. Several members of the crew gave evidence, and all stated that Bache was drunk throughout much of the voyage from England, including when the ship ran ashore. They disagreed as to whether Anderson was drunk. The ship's carpenter stated that Anderson had assaulted him on 30 May, the day before the shipwreck. A sailmaker said Anderson was drunk on 30 May, but sober on the day of the shipwreck. Two seamen had been at the helm when the ship ran ashore. Both stated that Anderson was sober, and one claimed he had never seen Anderson drunk. The inquiry summoned Bache to appear the next week, to testify as to why his Master's certificate should not be suspended.

On 23 June, Bache testified to the inquiry. He denied being drunk at the time of the shipwreck. He said that on 30 May he had the carpenter arrested and put in irons for quarrelling with a shipmate. He alleged that the crew's accusations of drunkenness against him were a conspiracy. Anderson and the Second Officer, James Hennessy, also claimed that Bache was sober. Another master mariner, Joseph Amora, told the inquiry that he knew of two other ships whose navigators made the same mistake as Bache. But the inquiry found Bache wholly responsible for the loss of the ship, much of its cargo, and a crewman's life, and suspended his Master's certificate for 12 months.

== Wreck and legislation ==
The surviving part of the wreck is only about 70 metres (230 ft) from the shore, in water only 3 to 5 metres (10 to 16 ft) deep. Its approximate position is 34.38388°S 150.91786°E.

From time to time, a violent storm uncovers part of the wreck. In 1976, exposed timbers were treated as a swimming hazard, removed by bulldozers, chopped up, burnt and used as landfill. However, lower parts of the wreck survived beneath the sand.

In 1991, another storm exposed parts of the wreck and her cargo, including "Bottles of spirits and preserved food, baby's bottles, railway iron, tins of lead paint, crates of rubber galoshes and even a variety of cemetery headstones", and "sealed bottles of preserved pickles and Hennessy's Cognac". This attracted looters, who used hammers, knives, and dredge hoses to remove natural concretions from the wreck and open its wooden cargo crates. Numerous ceramic, glass, and wooden artefacts were either destroyed or lost in the process.

At the time, the Historic Shipwrecks Act 1976 was available to protect historic shipwrecks, but not automatically. Each wreck had to be surveyed, and a report submitted for the appropriate Commonwealth Government minister to decide to order that the wreck be protected. Because of the heritage value of the Queen of Nations, this process was completed relatively quickly, and the order was published in the Commonwealth of Australia Gazette on 7 February 1992. This was, however, too late to protect much of the cargo that had been already looted or damaged.

The looting of the wreck and shortcomings in the 1976 Act led heritage interests to lobby state and Commonwealth legislatures. In the course of the 1990s, the majority of states of Australia enacted new laws to protect shipwrecks, and in 2018, the Parliament of Australia passed the Underwater Cultural Heritage Act 2018. The latter automatically protects any shipwreck more than 75 years old, without a minister having to issue an order specific to that wreck.

== Culture ==
Aberdeen Maritime Museum holds a painting of Queen of Nations by Richard Ball Spencer.

== Bibliography ==
- King, Peter (2017). The Aberdeen Line: George Thompson Jnr's incomparable shipping enterprise. Stroud: The History Press. pp. 115–116. ISBN 978-0-7509-7851-4.
