= H. Hill Goldsmith =

American psychologist

- Education: University of Minnesota
- Known for: Research on child temperament
- Spouse: Morton Ann Gernsbacher
- Scientific career
- Fields: Behavior genetics Developmental psychology
- Workplaces: University of Wisconsin–Madison
- Thesis: Behavior-genetic analyses of early personality (temperament) : developmental perspectives from the longitudinal study of twins during infancy and early childhood (1978)

Harold Hill Goldsmith is an American developmental psychologist and behavior geneticist. He is the Mark and Ilene Laufman Family Professor and the Antoine Bascom Professor & Leona Tyler Professor of Psychology at the University of Wisconsin–Madison. He is also the Chair of the University's Department of Psychology and coordinator of the Social and Affective Processes Group at the University's Waisman Center. His research focuses on multiple topics in developmental psychology, such as children's emotional development, temperament, and autism spectrum disorders. He first joined the faculty of the University of Wisconsin–Madison in 1992 with his wife, Morton Ann Gernsbacher. He is a fellow of the American Association for the Advancement of Science.
