= Tavíkovice =

- Municipality
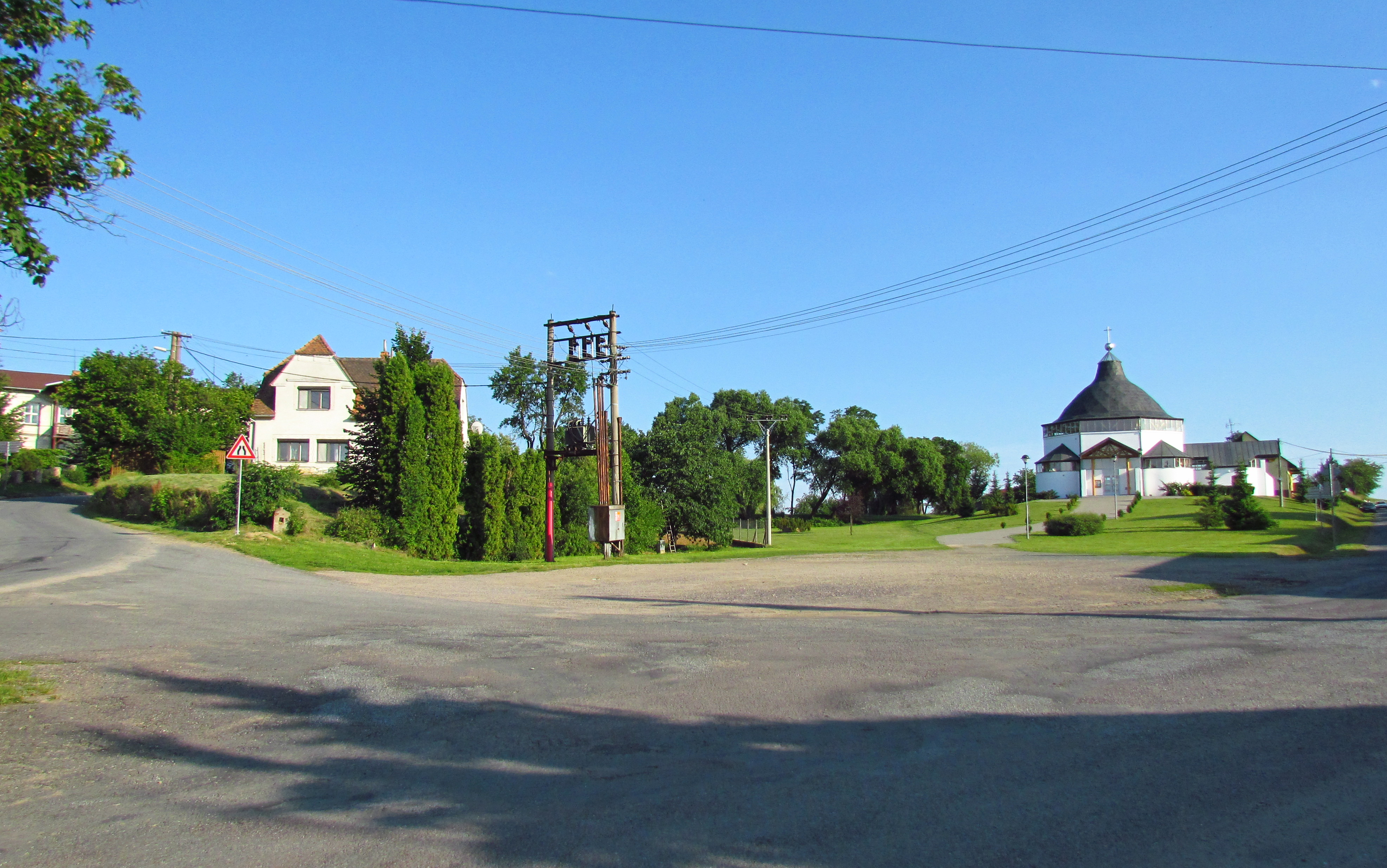
- Centre of Tavíkovice

- Coat of arms

- Location in the Czech Republic
- Coordinates: 49°2′2″N 16°6′11″E
- Country: Czech Republic
- Region: South Moravian
- District: Znojmo
- First mentioned: 1349

Area
  - Total: 10.03 km^{2} (3.87 sq mi)
- Elevation: 361 m (1,184 ft)

Population (2026-01-01)
  - Total: 552
  - Density: 55.0/km^{2} (143/sq mi)
- Time zone: UTC+1 (CET)
  - Summer (DST): UTC+2 (CEST)
- Postal code: 671 40
- Website: www.tavikovice.cz

Tavíkovice (German: Taikowitz) is a municipality and village in Znojmo District in the South Moravian Region of the Czech Republic. It has about 600 inhabitants.

Tavíkovice lies approximately 21 kilometres (13 mi) north of Znojmo, 42 km (26 mi) south-west of Brno, and 169 km (105 mi) south-east of Prague.

== Administrative division ==
Tavíkovice consists of two municipal parts (in brackets population according to the 2021 census):

- Tavíkovice (516)
- Dobronice (80)

== Demographics ==
Historical population
| Year | Pop. | ±% |
|---|---|---|
| 1869 | 541 | — |
| 1880 | 529 | −2.2% |
| 1890 | 608 | +14.9% |
| 1900 | 614 | +1.0% |
| 1910 | 773 | +25.9% |
| 1921 | 837 | +8.3% |
| 1930 | 803 | −4.1% |
| 1950 | 713 | −11.2% |
| 1961 | 613 | −14.0% |
| 1970 | 523 | −14.7% |
| 1980 | 467 | −10.7% |
| 1991 | 512 | +9.6% |
| 2001 | 617 | +20.5% |
| 2011 | 602 | −2.4% |
| 2021 | 596 | −1.0% |
Source: Censuses

== Notable people ==
- Nicholas Goldschmidt (1908–2004), Canadian conductor and music director
