= Morton Ann Gernsbacher =

American psychologist

- Education: University of North Texas; University of Texas at Dallas; University of Texas at Austin
- Known for: Structure building model of language comprehension, research on language processing in autistic people
- Scientific career
- Fields: Psychology; Psycholinguistics
- Workplaces: University of Wisconsin–Madison; University of Oregon
- Thesis: The effects of verbalization on memory for orientation in pictures Memory for Surface Information in Non-Verbal Stories: Parallels and Insights to Language Processes
- Doctoral advisor: Donald Foss

Morton Ann Gernsbacher is an American psychologist who is Vilas Research Professor and Sir Frederic Bartlett Professor of Psychology at the University of Wisconsin–Madison. She is a specialist in autism and psycholinguistics and has written and edited professional and lay books and over 100 peer-reviewed articles and book chapters on these subjects.

She has served on the advisory board of the journal Psychological Science in the Public Interest and has held several editor positions for Cognitive Psychology, Memory & Cognition and Language and Cognitive Processes. She was also president of the Association for Psychological Science in 2007.

== Biography and research interests ==
Gernsbacher received a B.A. from the University of North Texas in 1976, an M.S. from University of Texas at Dallas in 1980, and a Ph.D. from the University of Texas at Austin in human experimental psychology in 1983. She was employed at the University of Oregon from 1983 to 1992 before joining the faculty at the University of Wisconsin–Madison, where she has remained ever since.

Gernsbacher's research focuses on the cognitive processes and mechanisms that underlie language comprehension. She has challenged the view that language processing depends upon language-specific mechanisms, proposing instead that it draws on general cognitive processes such as working memory and pattern recognition. Motivated by the diagnosis of her son in 1998, much of Gernsbacher's research has focused on the cognitive and neurological processes of autistic people. As a result of investigating the language development of autistic children, Gernsbacher has posited that the speech difficulties associated with autism stem from motor planning challenges, not from intellectual limitations or social impairment. The implications of this perspective include a shift in focus from deficits in interpersonal communication to early sensory-motor challenges of autistic children, as well as recognition of previously unidentified competence in nonverbal autistic children.

She has published over 200 journal articles and had an h-index of 75 in late 2024. She has also edited several books.

Gernsbacher is married and has one child.

== Honors (selected) ==
- 2021 T. Morgan Distinguished Leadership Award from the Psychonomic Society Clifford
- 2018 APA’s Outstanding Educational Resource
- 2018 Project TIER Fellow
- 2017 Lifetime Achievement Award
- 2013 DSCA Winner
- 2008 became a Fellow of the American Educational Research Association
- 2007 William James Distinguished Lecturer in Psychological Science, Southeastern Psychological Association
- 2007 John Kendall Lecturer in Psychology, Gustavus Adolphus College
- 2006 President of the Association for Psychological Science (formerly the American Psychological Society)
- 2003 Elected Fellow of the Society of Experimental Psychologists
- 2001 Senior research fellowship, National Institute of Deafness and Communication Disorders, National Institutes of Health
- 2000 Distinguished Scientist Lecturer, American Psychological Association
- 1999 Vilas Associate Research Award, University of Wisconsin–Madison
- 1998 Professional Opportunities for Women in Research and Education Award (POWRE), National Science Foundation
- 1995 Elected Fellow of the American Association for the Advancement of Science
- 1994 Named Sir Frederic C. Bartlett Professor, University of Wisconsin–Madison
- 1993 Elected Fellow of the American Psychological Society (now the Association for Psychological Science)
- 1992 Elected Fellow of the American Psychological Association
