= Sandra Goldschmidt =

German trade unionist

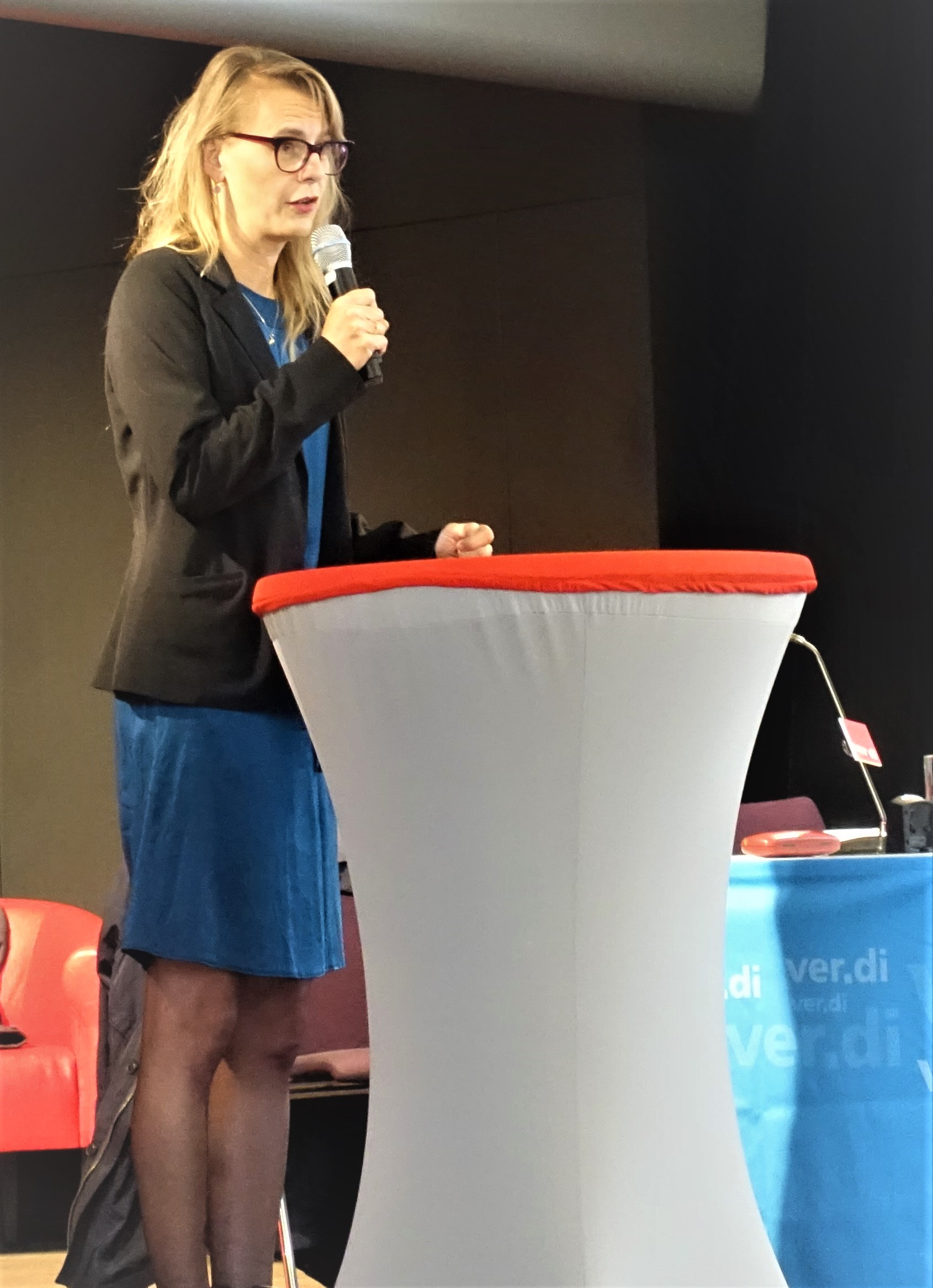
- Sandra Goldschmidt in September 2022
- Born: 23 February 1976 (age 50); Schwäbisch Gmünd, Baden-Württemberg, West Germany
- Known for: Trade unionism
- Political party: Alliance 90/The Greens

Sandra Goldschmidt (born 23 February 1976) is a German trade unionist. Since February 2023, she has been the regional director of the United Services Union (Ver.di) in Hamburg. She is deputy chairwoman of the supervisory board of the Hamburg Company for Asset and Investment Management, alternating chairwoman of the administrative board of the Federal Medical Service, and a member of the board of the NDR Broadcasting Council.

== Biography ==
Goldschmidt was born in a small village in Baden-Württemberg. After graduating from high school and training as a photographer, she worked as an employee in a commercial photography studio . In early 1999, she applied to the internet agency Pixelpark in Stuttgart, where she worked as a project manager for communications and e-business solutions. In 2002, she moved to the ver.di network for media professionals connexx.av in Munich, a union interest group that supports employees in radio and television broadcasting and the new media. There, she helped establish a works council at the media group and film distributor Premiere during the crisis surrounding the Kirch Group, among other things.

At the end of 2005, she became the personal assistant to ver.di chairman Frank Bsirske in Berlin. From there, she moved to Hanover in February 2009 as head of the social insurance department in the ver.di regional district of Lower Saxony-Bremen. On 28 February 2015, she was elected deputy regional director of ver.di in Hamburg, where she was responsible for the areas of women, youth, and the self-employed, as well as for member services and organizational development.

Goldschmidt was nominated as a candidate for the new ver.di regional leadership in January 2023, after the then ver.di head, Berthold Bose, announced that he would not run again for health reasons. A regional conference elected Goldschmidt as regional leader on 24 February 2023, with 56 of 82 valid votes. She and her team represent around 87,000 ver.di members in Hamburg.

Goldschmidt lives with her husband and three children in Hamburg-Stellingen and is a member of Alliance 90/The Greens.

== Memberships ==
- 2013 to 2020 Member of the Supervisory Board of HDI Kundenservice AG
- Member of the Supervisory Board of Hamburger Sparkasse since 2019
- Since 2021, alternating chairwoman of the Administrative Board of the Federal Medical Service
- Member of the Board of the NDR Broadcasting Council since June 2022
- Member of Alliance 90/The Greens
- since 2024 Deputy Chairwoman of the Supervisory Board of HGV

== Literature ==
- Jörn Breiholz: Als die hippe New Economy ihren ersten Betriebsrat gründete. In: Zeitschrift mitarbeit, Hrsg.: Vorstand der Freunde des Museums der Arbeit, Nr. 25/2021, S. 24–26
