= Theodor Goldschmidt =

German entrepreneur and chemist (1817–1875)

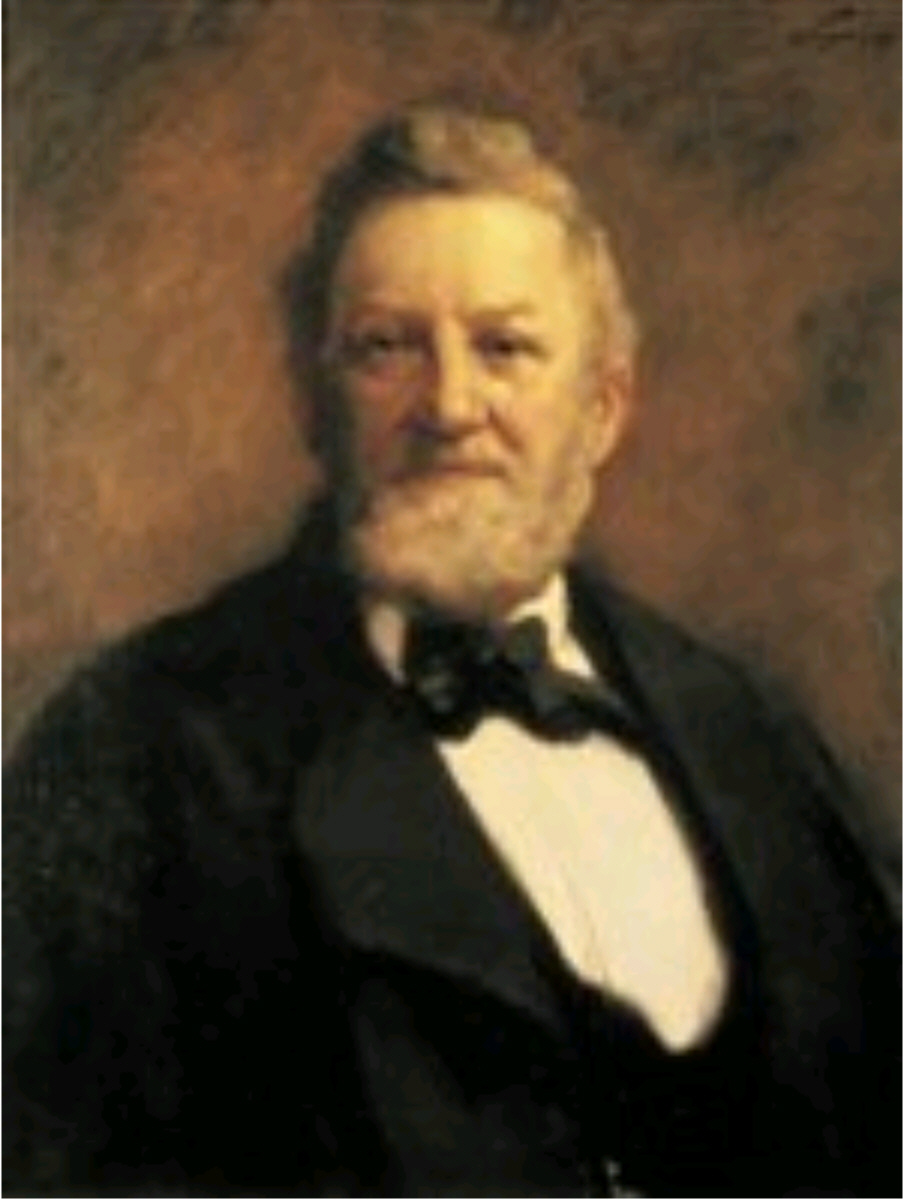

Carl Theodor Wilhelm Goldschmidt (4 June 1817 – 4 January 1875) was a German entrepreneur and chemist.

Goldschmidt was born in Berlin to a middle class Jewish family that owned a Calico plant. He studied chemistry at the University of Berlin, and then trained as a colorist, a specialist in dyeing textiles. On 8 December 1847, he founded a chemical factory in Berlin. In 1911, it became "Th. Goldschmidt AG". Goldschmidt was a city councilor in Berlin, was interested in philosophy and maintained close contacts with the famous chemists of his time.

Karl Goldschmidt and Hans Goldschmidt were his sons.

He died in 1875 in Berlin and was buried there. His grave is preserved in the Protestant Friedhof I der Jerusalems- und Neuen Kirchengemeinde (Cemetery No. I of the congregations of Jerusalem'spaye Church and New Church) in Berlin-Kreuzberg, south of Hallesches Tor.
