= Karl Friedrich Heinrich Bruchmann =

German classical philologist (1863-1919)

Karl Friedrich Heinrich Bruchmann (21 October 1863, Breslau – 24 April 1919) was a German classical philologist.

From 1881 to 1885, Bruchmann studied philology and history at the University of Breslau, receiving his doctorate with the dissertation De Apolline et graeca Minerva deis medicis. From August 1888 onward, he was a teacher at Königliches König-Wilhelms-Gymnasium in Breslau.

In 1893, Bruchmann published a supplement to Wilhelm Heinrich Roscher's dictionary of Greek and Roman mythology, "Ausführliches Lexikon der griechischen und römischen Mythologie". Other noted works by Bruchmann include:

- Psychologische Studien zur Sprachgeschichte, 1888 – Psychological studies of linguistic history.
- Beiträge zur Ephoros--Kritik, 1890 – Critique of Ephoros.
- Epitheta deorum quae apud poetas graecos leguntur, 1893.
