= Goldschmid =

Goldschmid is a German surname meaning "gold smith". Notable people with the surname include:

- Harvey Goldschmid, law professor at Columbia University
- David Goldschmid, American television writer and producer

== See also ==
- Goldschmid
- Goldschmidt
- Goldschmied
- Goldschmitt
- Goldsmid
- Goldsmith
- Aurifaber
