= Grace Arabell Goldsmith =

American physician and researcher on nutritional deficiency diseases

Grace Arabella Smith
- Born: 8 April 1904
- Died: 28 April 1975 (aged 71); New Orleans
- Education: Tulane University
- Known for: Identifying the cause of pellagra disease

Grace Arabell Goldsmith (8 April 1904 – 28 April 1975) was a U.S. physician best known for her research on nutritional deficiency diseases, B-complex vitamins, and the vitamin enrichment of foods. She identified the cause of the disease pellagra.

== Biography ==
Goldsmith was born in St. Paul, Minnesota. Goldsmith studied her B.S. at the University of Wisconsin in 1925, and received her M.D. from Tulane University and then joined their medical school faculty (1936–75).

Goldsmith is best known for her research on nutritional deficiency diseases, B-complex vitamins, vitamin enrichment of foods, as well as pioneering nutritional training for medical students. Goldsmith discovered the specific roles of dietary folic acid and vitamin B-12 and determined that niacin deficiency was the cause of pellagra.

Goldsmith was made Chairman of the Department of Nutrition and Dean of the Department of Public Health and Tropical Medicine at Tulane University in 1967.

== Legacy ==
The Grace A. Goldsmith Award from the American College of Nutrition has been awarded to scientists "for significant achievements in the field of nutrition" since 1995.
