= Lewis Gerhardt Goldsmith =

In 1879, during an international fad for attempting long voyages in tiny boats, 40-year-old Captain Lewis Gerhardt Goldsmith, a Danish immigrant and American Civil War veteran, announced at a press conference in Boston, Massachusetts, that he was having built a boat of his own design. The boat would be based on the latest "lifeboat" technology, and he would sail around the world in it. Named Uncle Sam, it was to be an open dory 18.5 feet (5.6 m) long by 6 feet (1.8 m) wide, with a single fore-and-aft rigged mast. In place of a cabin, the Uncle Sam would have a watertight "trunk", (an oilcloth-covered wooden box) large enough to sleep in. Goldsmith also announced that his new 22-year-old wife, who had no prior seafaring experience, would be accompanying him as his "crew".

The planned route would take them along the coast of North America to Newfoundland, then to England, to a restorative stopover with family in Copenhagen, then through Gibraltar to the Mediterranean, through the new Suez Canal and on to the Indian Ocean. Then from India, on to China, Japan, Hawaii, San Francisco, Cape Horn, and home. He said they would leave in July 1879 and would return in November 1881, allowing time to exhibit the remarkable boat in cities along the route.

The Goldsmiths left Boston Harbor at dawn on Sunday, June 1, ahead of schedule. Their progress, as reported by passing vessels and by the ports-of-call where they stopped, was charted in newspapers all over the United States, making use of the new undersea telegraph cables. Uncle Sam made port in Halifax, Nova Scotia, on July 4, for a week of resupply and repair. The Goldsmiths moved northeastward along the Maritimes, heading for St John's. In early July Uncle Sam was badly damaged in a storm and had to make an emergency stop at the tiny French possession of Saint Pierre and Miquelon, just south of Newfoundland. Mrs. Goldsmith had become seriously ill, diagnosed, according to the Captain's log, with "inflammation of the bowel", so both she and Uncle Sam needed rest and repair. With the help of the local French community, Goldsmith was able to get underway again and reached St. Johns, the last stop before England, on August 7. After a final resupply they set out for Liverpool in mid-August.

A week later, 600 miles west of Liverpool, they encountered storms and fogs on the Grand Banks. In a "great storm" on August 16, a huge wave swept away their sea anchors and most of their supplies. Uncle Sam was swamped and filled with water, and Mrs Goldsmith was sitting in water "up to her shoulders". The storm continued through August 17 and 18, but the boat's watertight compartments kept it afloat.

On August 21, after days of misery in the flooded boat, suffering injury and illness, Goldsmith spotted the sails of a passing ship and, rigging a temporary storm sail, gave chase. After a desperate hour, someone on the ship sighted Uncle Sam astern and raised the alarm. The ship was the British clipper Queen Of Nations, whose crew threw a rope to the couple in their derelict boat and hauled them aboard. Goldsmith's last act before debarking was to open the seacocks on the compartments to scuttle Uncle Sam. Even aboard the clipper they were not yet safe. For two weeks the ship was battered by storms before arriving safely in Liverpool on September 3.

Word of the Goldsmith's rescue was crossed the Atlantic and made headlines in papers all over America. Goldsmith gave another press conference and then the couple went home to Brooklyn. They named their first child Miquelon.

For 20 years, he was employed as an inspector in the molding department in the Brooklyn Navy Yard. He died at age 74 on November 2, 1913 in Brooklyn, New York and is buried in Evergreens Cemetery.
