= Goldschmied =

Goldschmied is a German surname meaning "goldsmith". Notable people with the surname include:

- Antony Goldschmied (born 1964), English entrepreneur
- Adriano Goldschmied (1944–2026), Italian fashion designer
- Elinor Goldschmied (1910–2009), British educationalist
- José Goldschmied (born 1975), Mexican judoka
- Marco Goldschmied (1944–2022), British architect

== See also ==
- Goldschmid
- Goldschmidt
- Goldschmitt
- Goldsmid
- Goldsmith
- Aurifaber
