= Nicholas Goldschmidt =

Canadian musician (1908–2004)

- Born: December 6, 1908; Tavíkovice, Margraviate of Moravia, Austria-Hungary
- Died: February 8, 2004 (aged 95); Toronto, Ontario
- Awards: Order of Canada

Nicholas Goldschmidt, CC (December 6, 1908 – February 8, 2004) was a Canadian conductor, administrator, teacher, performer, music festival entrepreneur and artistic director. He was the grand-nephew of famed composer Adalbert von Goldschmidt (1848-1906).

In 1937, Goldschmidt immigrated to the US, where he served as director of opera at the San Francisco Conservatory and Stanford University from 1938 to 1942. He was director of the opera department at Columbia University from 1942 to 1944. He subsequently moved to Toronto, where he served as the first music director of the Royal Conservatory Opera School (University of Toronto Opera Division) from 1946 to 1957. In 1950, Goldschmidt, Arnold Walter and Herman Geiger-Torel helped to found the Royal Conservatory Opera Company, which later became the Canadian Opera Company. From 1949 to 1957, Goldschmidt was the first music director of the CBC Opera Company.

In 1978, Goldschmidt was made an Officer of the Order of Canada, and was promoted to Companion in 1989. In 1997, Goldschmidt received the Governor General's Performing Arts Award, Canada's highest honour in the performing arts.

Goldschmidt married Shelagh Fraser on 26 June 1948.
