= Hans Goldschmidt =

German chemist (1861–1923)

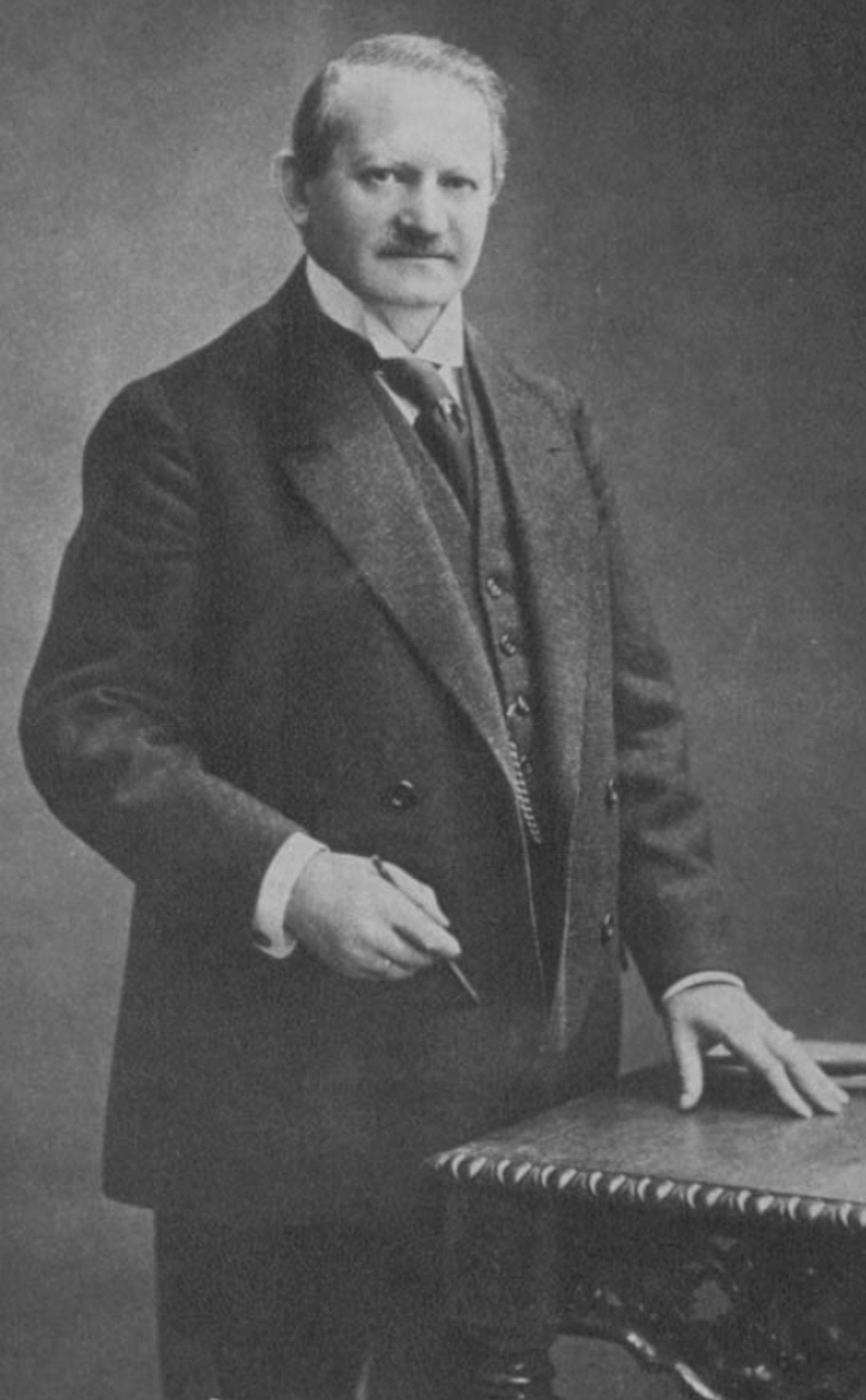
- Born: Johannes Wilhelm Goldschmidt; 18 January 1861; Berlin, Kingdom of Prussia
- Died: 21 May 1923 (aged 62); Baden-Baden, Republic of Baden
- Education: University of Berlin
- Known for: Thermite reaction
- Awards: Elliott Cresson Medal (1904)
- Scientific career
- Doctoral advisor: Robert Bunsen

Signature
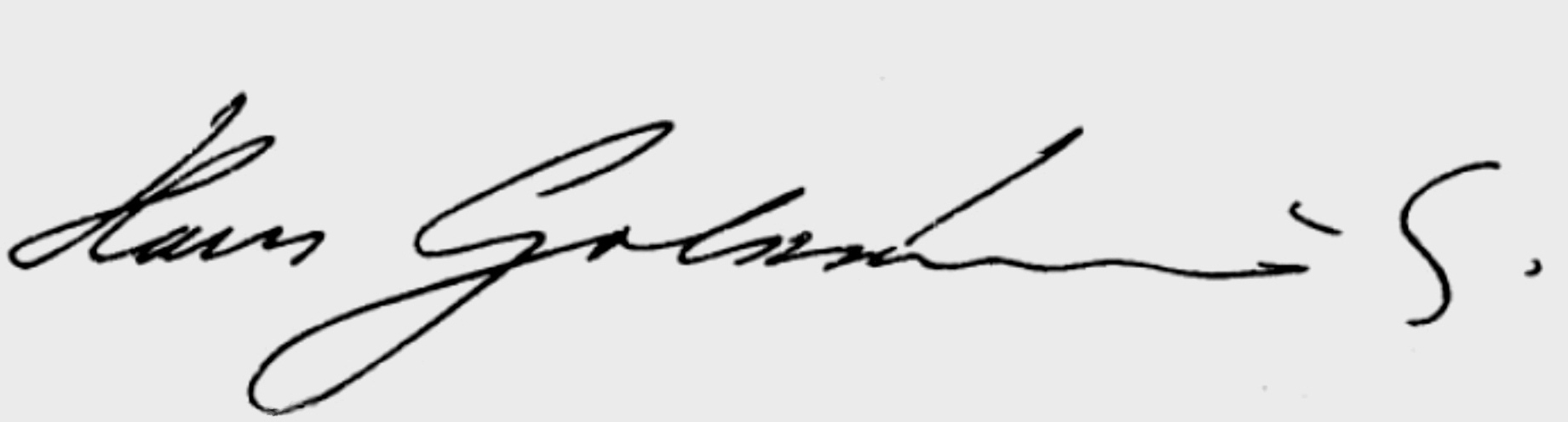

Johannes Wilhelm "Hans" Goldschmidt (18 January 1861 – 21 May 1923) was a German chemist notable as the discoverer of the Thermite reaction. He was also co-owner of the Chemische Fabrik Th. Goldschmidt, as of 1911 Th. Goldschmidt AG (later to become part of Evonik Industries) and its most important chemist. The reaction, also called the Goldschmidt process, is used for thermite welding, often used to join railway tracks. Thermites have also been used in metal refining, disabling munitions, and in incendiary weapons. Some thermite-like mixtures are used as pyrotechnic initiators in fireworks.

== Biography ==
He was born in Berlin on 18 January 1861. He was a student of Robert Bunsen. His father, Theodor Goldschmidt, was the founder of the chemical company Chemische Fabrik Th. Goldschmidt in Essen which eventually became part of the modern company Degussa, and Hans and his brother Karl Hering managed this company for many years.

The original German patent for thermite issued to the firm Th. Goldschmidt in 1898

He is principally noted as the co-inventor of sodium amalgam and the initial patent holder of the thermite reaction. The thermite (or aluminothermic) reaction is one in which aluminium is oxidized by an oxide of another metal, usually iron oxide, producing great heat in the process. Goldschmidt was originally interested in producing very pure metals by avoiding the use of carbon in smelting, but he soon realized the value in welding, a process known as thermic welding. It is also used in incendiary devices. This process is sometimes called the "Goldschmidt reaction" or "Goldschmidt process", because he furthered its development, and filed for patent in 1895. He also went on to publish an extensive paper on it in 1898.

He died on 21 May 1923.

== Legacy ==
His grave is preserved in the Protestant Friedhof I der Jerusalems- und Neuen Kirchengemeinde (Cemetery No. I of the congregations of Jerusalem's Church and New Church) in Berlin-Kreuzberg, south of Hallesches Tor.

== See also ==
- Thermite welding
- Claude Vautin
