= Goldsmith Block =

- U.S. National Register of Historic Places
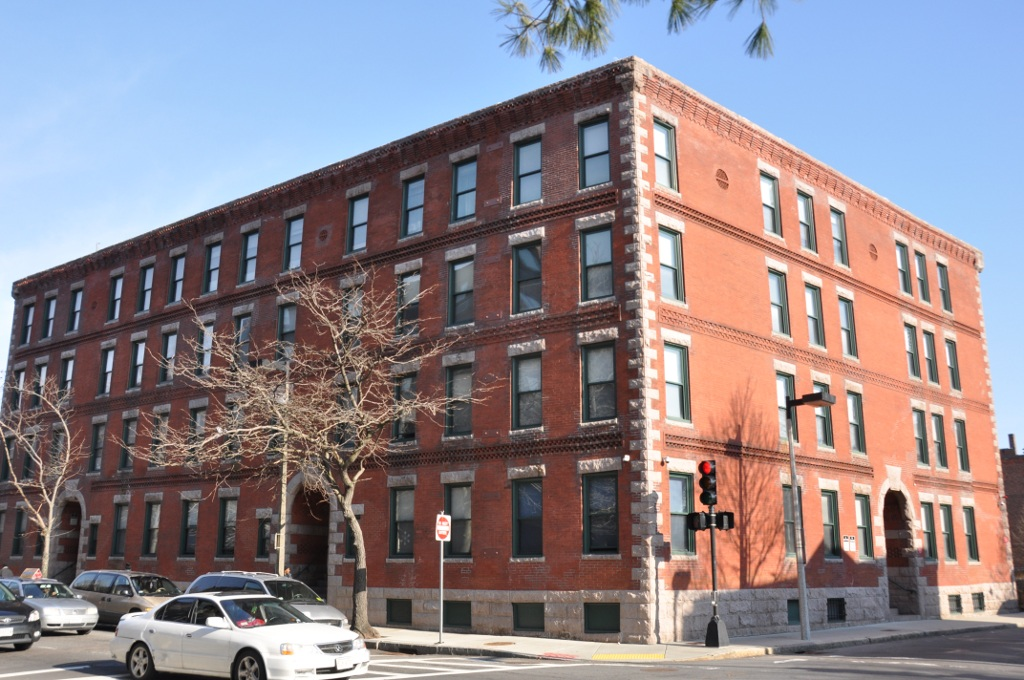

- Location within Massachusetts Location within the United States
- Location: Boston, Massachusetts
- Coordinates: 42°19′55.6″N 71°5′1.4″W
- Built: 1892
- Architect: Russell, Cornelius A.
- Architectural style: Classical Revival
- NRHP reference No.: 07000510
- Added to NRHP: June 5, 2007

The Goldsmith Block is an historic apartment building at 41 Ruggles Street, 746–750 Shawmut Avenue in Boston, Massachusetts. The four story, orange brick building was built in 1892 by Samuel Goldsmith to a design by Cornelius Russell, a regionally notable designer of apartment blocks. The building has restrained Classical Revival and Romanesque elements. It is one of a small number of 19th-century buildings to survive an urban redevelopment project in the area during the 1960s.

The building was listed on the National Register of Historic Places in 2007.

== See also ==
- National Register of Historic Places listings in southern Boston, Massachusetts
