= Adalbert von Goldschmidt =

Austrian composer, poet and satirist (1848–1906)

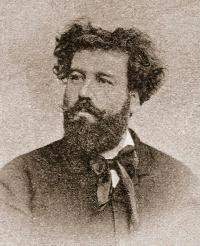

Adalbert von Goldschmidt (5 May 1848 in Vienna – 21 December 1906 in Vienna) was an Austrian composer, poet and satirist of Jewish origin.

Being a friend of Hugo Wolf and Anton Bruckner and trained at the Vienna Conservatory, he first drew wide acclaim for his work Die sieben Todsünden (The seven deadly sins), the first oratorio in the history of music using Richard Wagners orchestration and techniques. He was a scholar of Franz Liszt and created a trilogy of operas; the first of which, Helianthus, premiered successfully in Leipzig in 1884. He also composed numerous songs (on poems by Goethe, Mörike, Brothers Grimm, Lord Byron, Victor Hugo Paul Verlaine) and some works for solo piano. His grand-nephew was the conductor Nicholas Goldschmidt.

In 2020 a first book about his long forgotten work got published: "Der Unsterblichkeitsclown: Adalbert von Goldschmidt - Ein Dichterkomponist im Wiener Fin de Siècle", written by Christian Filips.

A blog on his life and work contains audios and videos of his songs, i.e. his songs after the fairy tales by the Brothers Grimm, the German poets Eduard Mörike or Goethe and the French poets Paul Verlaine and Victor Hugo.
