= Goldschmitt =

Goldschmitt is a German surname meaning "goldsmith". It may refer to:

- Daniel Goldschmitt (born 1989), German footballer
- The Family Goldschmitt (1971), a poem collection by Henri Coulette

== See also ==
- Goldschmid
- Goldschmidt
- Goldschmied
- Goldsmid
- Goldsmith
- Aurifaber
