= Aurifaber =

Aurifaber (the Latinized form of the German surname "Goldschmidt" or "Goldschmied" meaning "gold smith") was a surname borne by three prominent men of the Reformation period in Germany:

- Andreas Aurifaber (1514–1559), physician from Breslau, living in Königsberg
- Joannes Aurifaber Vratislaviensis (1517–1568), Lutheran theologian and reformer from Breslau, brother of Andreas
- Joannes Aurifaber Vimariensis (1519–1575), Lutheran theologian and reformer from Weimar

== Variation on surname ==
- Goldschmid
- Goldschmidt
- Goldschmied
- Goldschmitt
- Goldsmid
- Goldsmith
