= Stephen Goldsmith (disambiguation) =

Stephen Goldsmith (born 1946) is an American politician.

Stephen Goldsmith may also refer to:

- Stephen Goldsmith (South African cricketer) (1868–1951)
- Steve Goldsmith (cricketer) (born 1964), English former professional cricketer
- Stevie Goldsmith (a.k.a. "Gadlabarti"; died 2017), Aboriginal Australian cultural adviser, musician, and actor
