= Goldsmid (name) =

Goldsmid is a German surname. Notable people with the name include:

== Surname ==
=== Goldsmid ===
- Albert Goldsmid (1846–1904), British officer, founder of the Jewish Lads' Brigade (in 1895) and the Maccabaeans
- Anna Maria Goldsmid (1805–1889), British benefactor and translator
- Francis Goldsmid (1808–1878), Anglo-Jewish barrister and politician
- Frederic John Goldsmid (1818–1908), officer in the British Army and the East India Company, also served the British government
- Frederick Goldsmid (1812–1866), Anglo-Jewish politician
- Isaac Goldsmid (1778–1859), British financier and one of the leading figures in the Jewish emancipation in the United Kingdom
- Julian Goldsmid (1838–1896), British lawyer, businessman and Liberal (later Liberal Unionist) politician
- Louisa Goldsmid (1819–1908), British philanthropist and education activist

=== Modified surname ===
d'Avigdor-Goldsmid

- Henry d'Avigdor-Goldsmid (1909–1976), British army officer, company director and politician
- Jack d'Avigdor-Goldsmid (1912–1987), British Army officer and British Conservative politician
- Osmond d'Avigdor-Goldsmid (1877–1940), British Baronet who served as High Sheriff of Kent in 1912, President of the Anglo-Jewish Association

Goldsmid-Stern-Salomons

- David Lionel Goldsmid-Stern-Salomons

== Variation on surname ==
- Goldschmid
- Goldschmidt
- Goldschmied
- Goldschmitt
- Goldsmith
- Aurifaber

== See also ==
- Goldsmid family
- Goldsmid baronets
- D'Avigdor-Goldsmid baronets
- Goldsmid-Stern-Salomons baronets
