= Historische Sprachforschung =

Historische Sprachforschung / Historical Linguistics
- Discipline: Indo-European historical linguistics
- Language: English, French, German
- Edited by: Martin Kümmel, Olav Hackstein, Sabine Ziegler

Publication details
- Former name: Zeitschrift für vergleichende Sprachforschung
- History: 1852–present
- Publisher: Vandenhoeck & Ruprecht
- Frequency: Annually

Standard abbreviations
- ISO 4: Hist. Sprachforsch.

Indexing
- ISSN: 0935-3518
- LCCN: 89642899
- JSTOR: 09353518
- OCLC no.: 237226312

Links
- Journal homepage

Historische Sprachforschung / Historical Linguistics is an annual peer-reviewed academic journal covering Indo-European historical linguistics. It is the second oldest linguistics journal still in publication. The current editors-in-chief are Martin Kümmel (University of Jena), Olav Hackstein, and Sabine Ziegler. The journal is published by Vandenhoeck & Ruprecht.

== History ==
The journal was originally established by Adalbert Kuhn in 1852, and consequently known colloquially as Kuhns Zeitschrift (Journal de Kuhn, 'Kuhn's Journal'). Its official name was Zeitschrift für vergleichende Sprachforschung auf dem Gebiete des Deutschen, Griechischen und Lateinischen (lit. 'Magazine for Comparative Linguistics Research on German, Greek, and Latin') from 1852 to 1874. For most of this period, it ran in parallel to its sister publication Beiträge zur vergleichenden Sprachforschung auf dem Gebiete der arischen, celtischen und slawischen Sprachen ('Articles for Comparative Linguistics Research on the Aryan, Celtic, and Slavic Languages', known colloquially at Kuhn-Schleichlers Beiträge), which existed from 1858 to 1876.

In 1877, the publications merged with each other and with Beiträge zur Kunde der indogermanischen Sprachen ('Articles for the Science of Indo-European Languages', known colloquially as Bezzenbergers Beiträge, 1877–1906) as Zeitschrift für vergleichende Sprachforschung auf dem Gebiete der indogermanischen Sprachen ('Magazine for Comparative Linguistics Research on the Indo-European Languages'). This title persisted until 1967.

From 1968 to 1987, the journal was called Zeitschrift für vergleichende Sprachforschung ('Journal of Comparative Linguistics').

It obtained its present title in 1988.
