= Louis Amédée Mante =

French photographer and inventor (1826–1913)

Louis Amédée Mante (1826–1913) was a French photographer and inventor whose later career coincided with that of his co-worker and later son-in-law Edmond Goldschmidt (1863–1934).

== Life ==
Louis Amédée Mante reportedly developed his own process for colouring photographic prints in Paris in 1895. The process, dubbed 'Mantochrome', was very similar to the later, more famous Autochrome. He increasingly worked alongside Edmond Goldschmidt, a wealthy and talented young photographer who won a gold medal for his coloured photographs at the 1892 Paris Exposition and later married one of Mante's daughters.

Mantes is said to have once lived in the same building as Edgar Degas on the rue Norvins, Paris, and Degas painted his neighbour's wife and two daughters in the pastel The Monte Family, c. 1884.

== Works ==
Mante

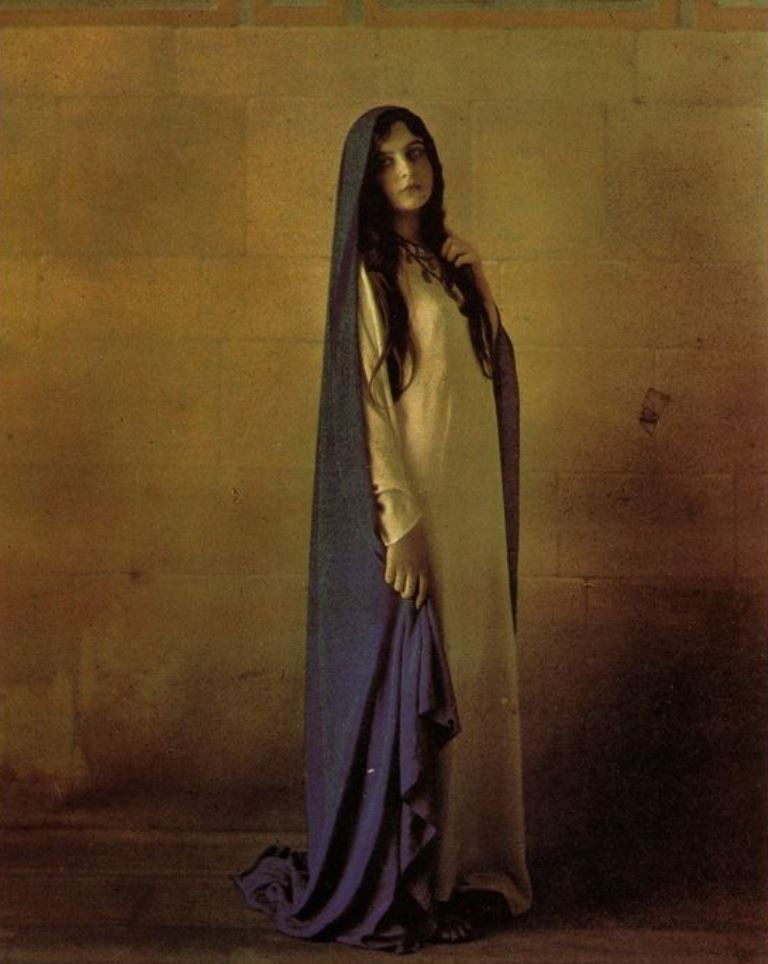
Cléo de Mérode, 1895

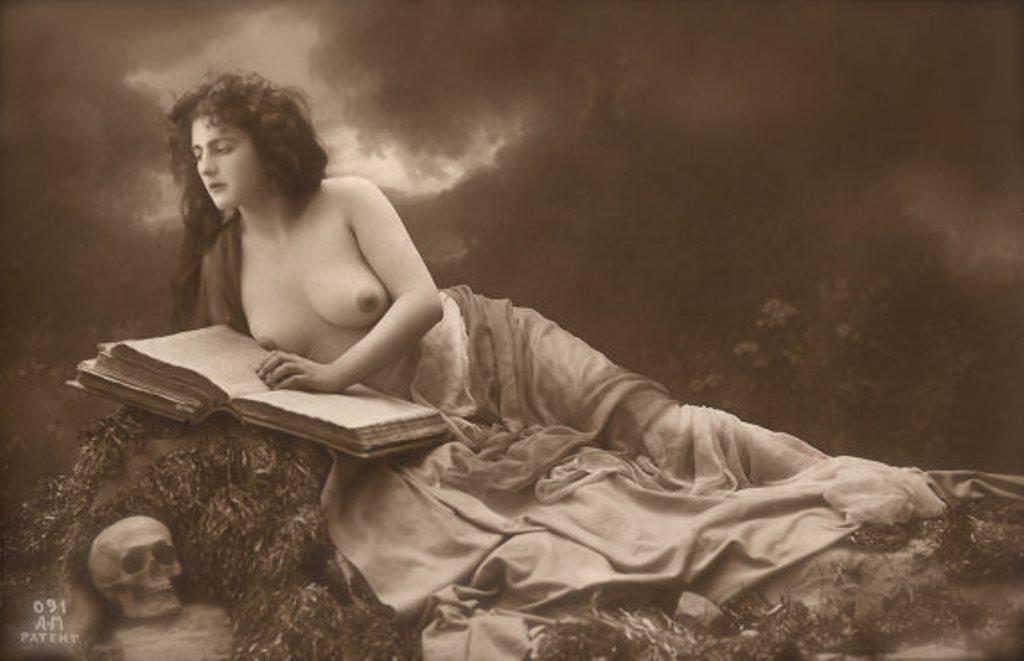
Woman (A M Patent 091), c. 1900

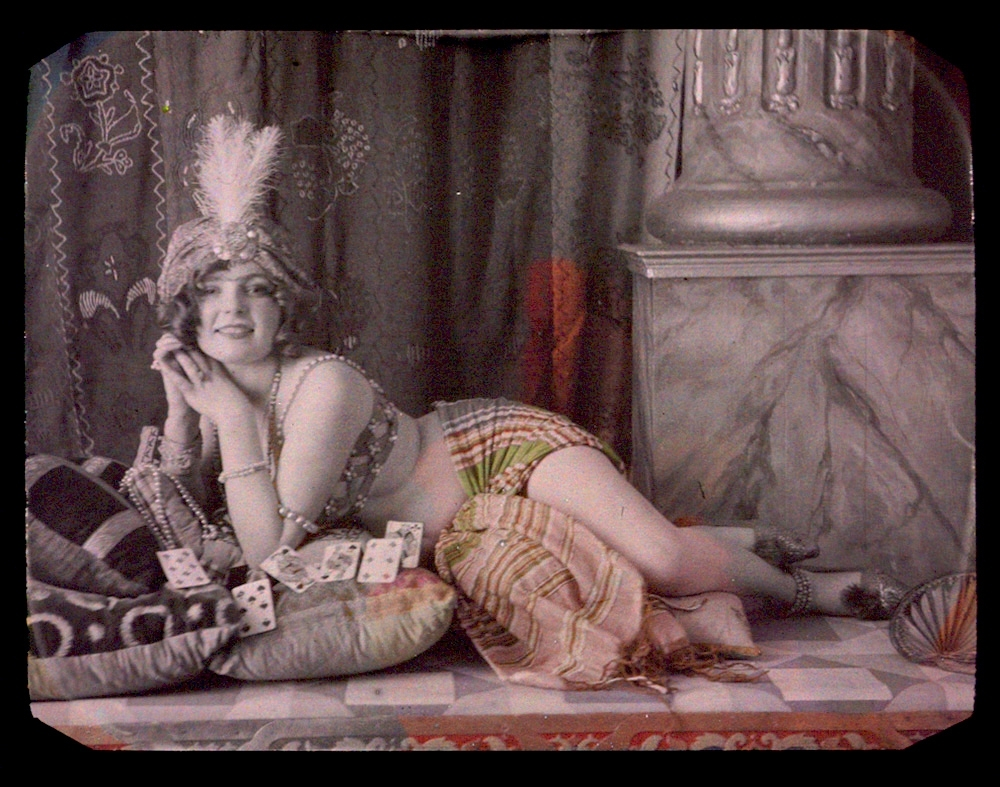
Odalisque with Playing Cards, 1912
Mante and Goldschmidt

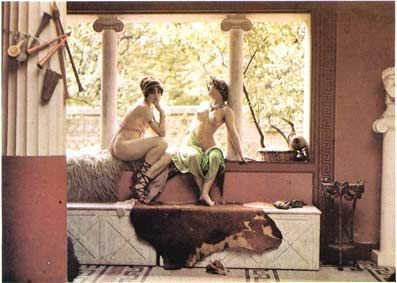

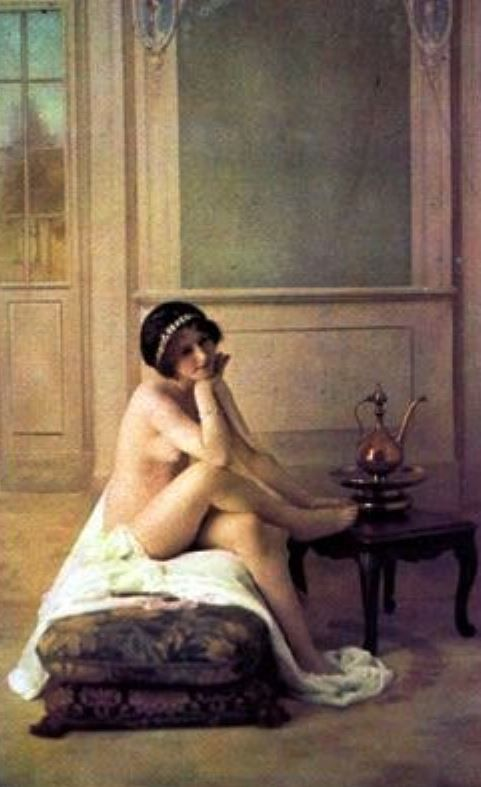

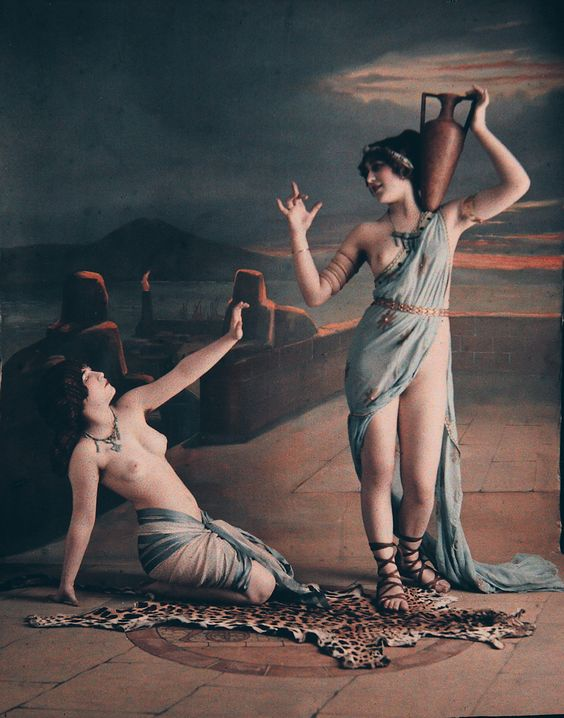

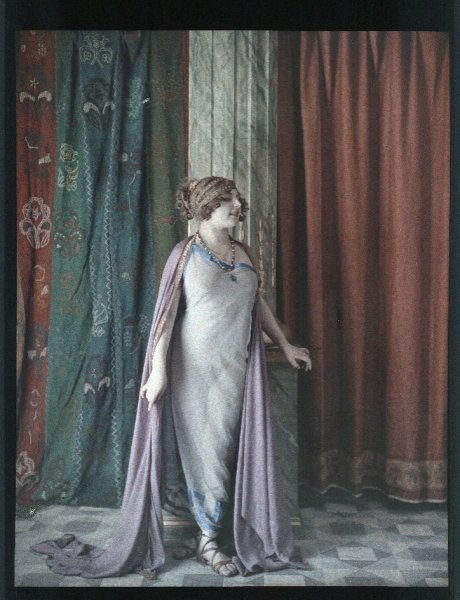

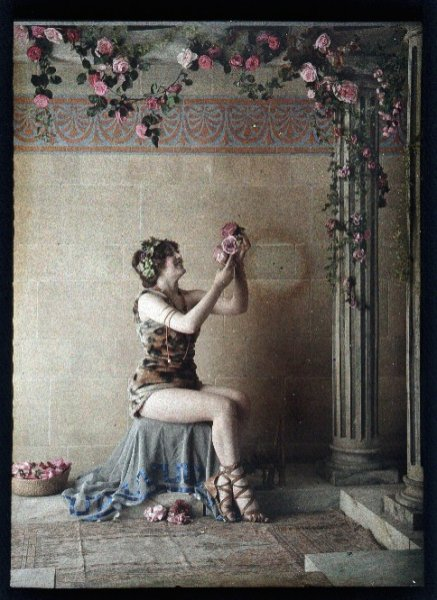

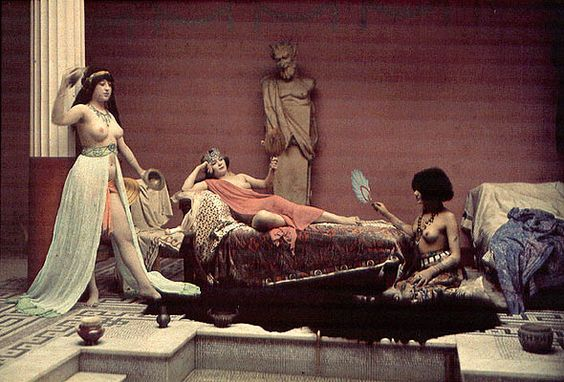
Goldschmidt

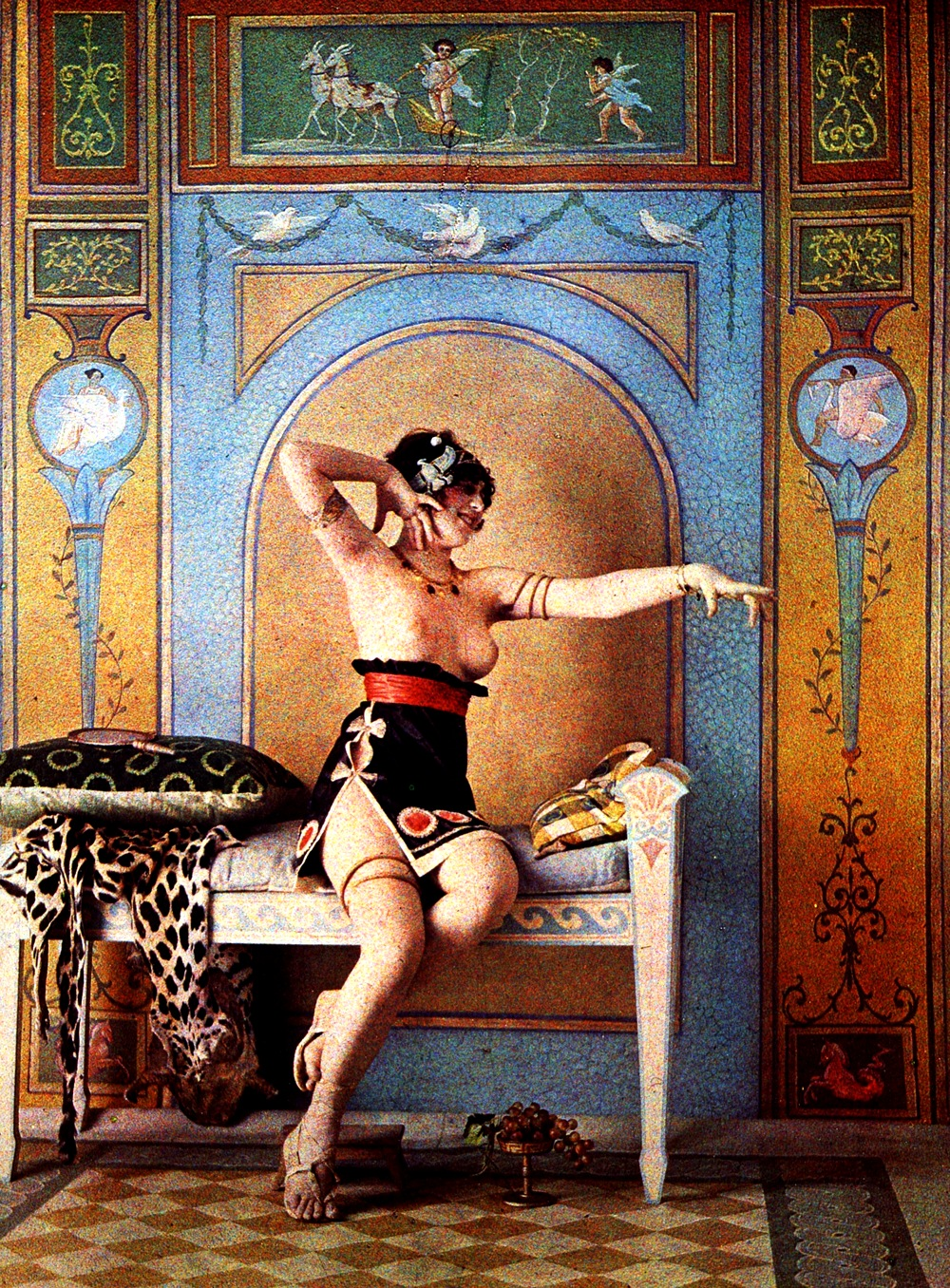

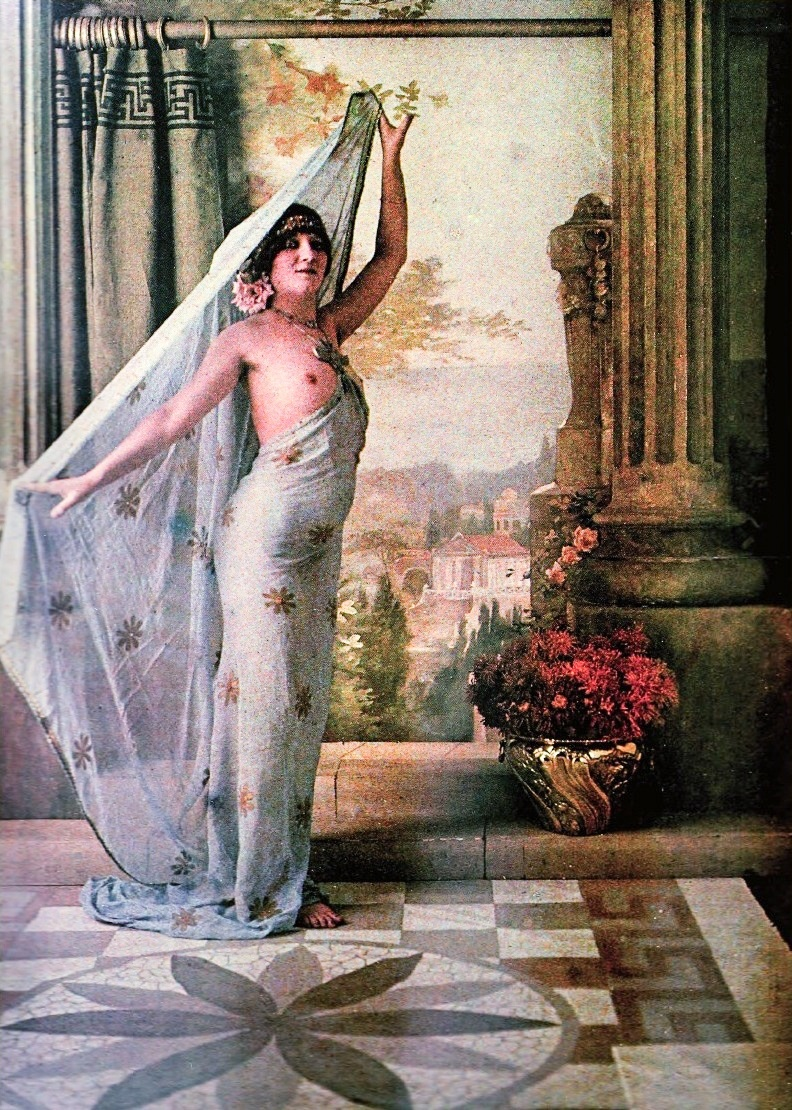

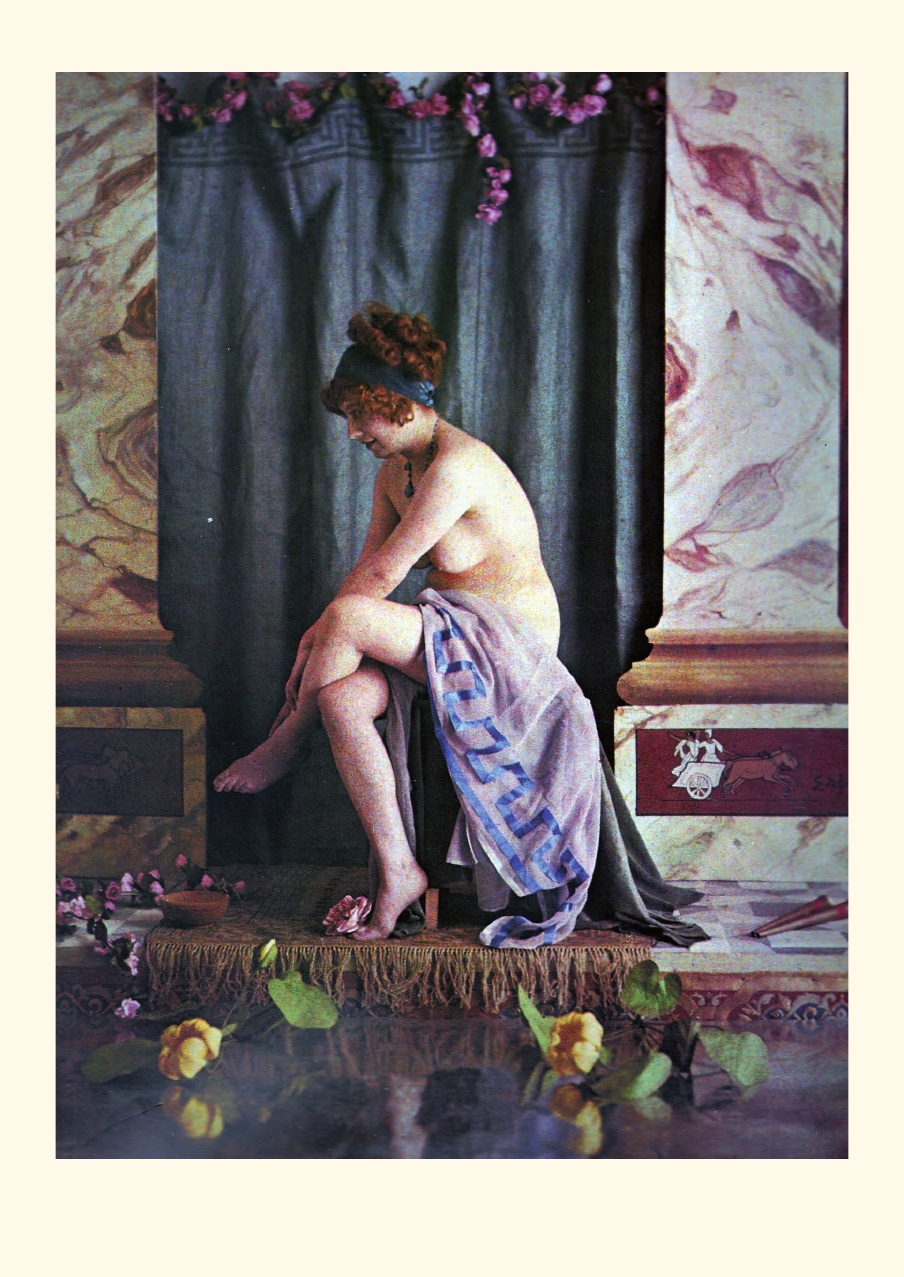

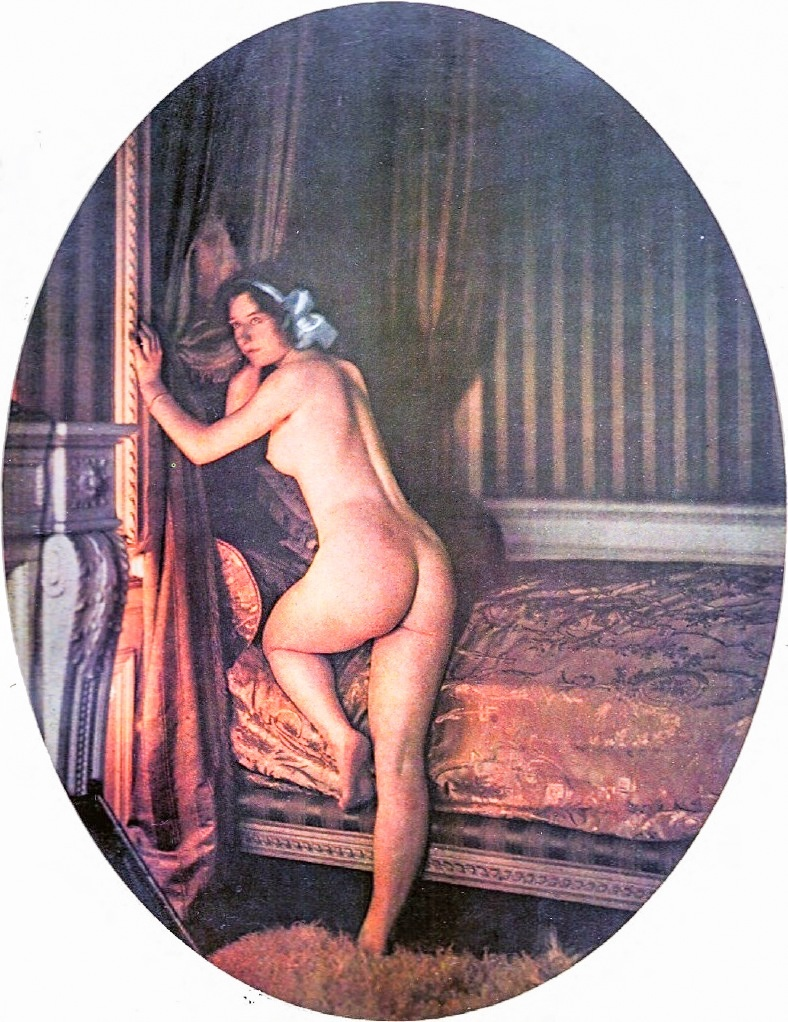

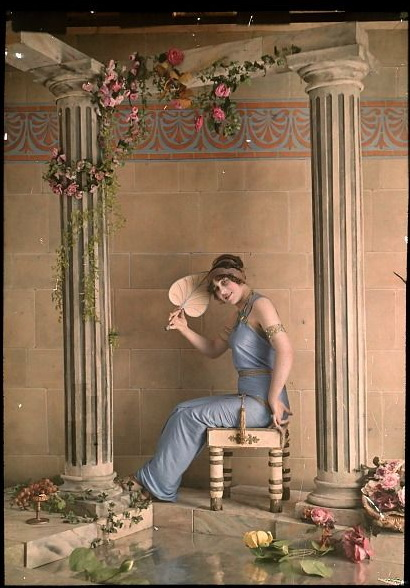

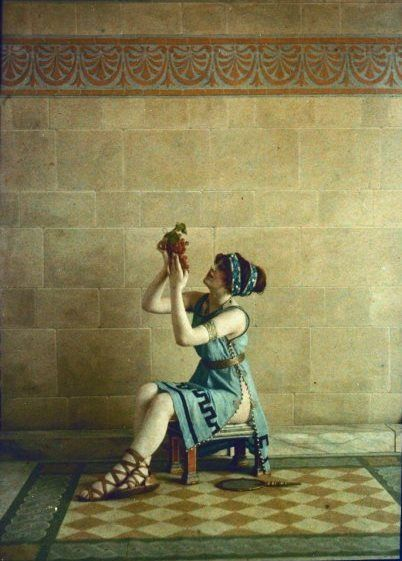

== Sources ==
- Boggs, Jean Sutherland (1985). "Degas at the Museum: Works in the Philadelphia Museum of Art and John G. Johnson Collection". Philadelphia Museum of Art Bulletin, 81(346/347). pp. 2–48. Retrieved 28 May 2023. JSTOR 3795436
- Hammond, Anne (1991). "Impressionist Theory and the Autochrome". History of Photography, 15(2). pp. 96–100. Retrieved 28 May 2023 – via Taylor & Francis Online.
- "Louis-Amedee Mante & Edmond Goldschmidt: Group nude study, after the antique, c. 1910s". Christie's. 2004. Archived from the original on 28 May 2023.
- "The Mante Family". Philadelphia Museum of Art. Retrieved 28 May 2023.
