= Isaac Goldsmith =

Irish clergyman (1706–1769)

Isaac Goldsmith (1706- 15 June 1769) was an Anglican priest in Ireland in the 18th century.

Goldsmith was born in Elphin and educated at Trinity College, Dublin. He was Dean of Cloyne from 1736 until his death.
