= David Goldsmith (cricketer) =

English cricketer (1947–2023)

Personal information
- Full name: David John Goldsmith
- Born: 11 September 1947; Romford, Essex, England
- Died: November 2023 (aged 76)
- Batting: Right-handed
- Role: Wicket-keeper

Domestic team information
- Years: Team
- 1986–1991: Buckinghamshire

Career statistics
Competition	List A
Matches	5
Runs scored	7
Batting average	2.33
100s/50s	–/–
Top score	4
Balls bowled	–
Wickets	–
Bowling average	–
5 wickets in innings	–
10 wickets in match	–
Best bowling	–
Catches/stumpings	1/–
- Source: Cricinfo, 4 May 2011

David John Goldsmith (11 September 1947 – November 2023) was an English cricketer. Goldsmith was a right-handed batsman who fielded as a wicket-keeper. He was born in Romford, Essex.

Goldsmith made his debut for Buckinghamshire in the 1986 Minor Counties Championship against Berkshire. Goldsmith played Minor counties cricket for Buckinghamshire from 1986 to 1991, which included 34 Minor Counties Championship matches and 11 MCCA Knockout Trophy matches. In 1987, he made his List A debut against Somerset in the NatWest Trophy. He played 4 further List A matches for Buckinghamshire, the last coming against Somerset in the 1991 NatWest Trophy. In his 5 List A matches, he scored 7 runs at a batting average of 2.33, with a high score of 4.
