= Bankers Also Have Souls =

1982 film by Michel Lang

- Directed by: Michel Lang
- Written by: Italo Terzoli (play); Enrico Vaime (play)
- Starring: Pierre Mondy; Claudia Cardinale; Clio Goldsmith
- Cinematography: Daniel Gaudry
- Edited by: Hélène Plemiannikov
- Music by: Michel Legrand
- Release date: 1982
- Countries: France; Italy

Bankers Also Have Souls (French: Le Cadeau;Italian: Il regalo), also released as The Gift, is a 1982 French and Italian film. It stars Claudia Cardinale. It is based upon the play written by Italo Terzoli and Enrico Vaime, originally brought to success by Gino Bramieri, Valeria Valeri and Paola Tedesco.

== Plot ==
Gregoire is retiring after many years with the same bank, and his colleagues surprise him with the gift of a beautiful call girl, Barbara. Thinking she is a conquest, he impersonates the bank president, leading to a comedy of mistaken identities.

== Cast ==
- Pierre Mondy as Grégoire Dufour
- Claudia Cardinale as Antonella Dufour
- Clio Goldsmith as Joyane / Barbara
- Jacques François as Jacques Loriol
- Renzo Montagnani as emiro Fayçal di Krator
- Cécile Magnet as Charlotte Legueden
- Henri Guybet as André
- Rémi Laurent as Laurent
- Yolande Gilot as Jennifer
- Laurence Badie as Marie-Laure
- Christophe Bourseiller as Jean-Philippe Loriol
- Duilio Del Prete as Umberto

== Reception ==
While praising the original play, Italian critic Tullio Kezich described the film as "a rancid frozen dish à la Feydeau, stuffed with archaeological gags".
