= Pat Thomas (journalist) =

Pat Thomas (born 1959 in California) is an author, journalist and campaigner specialising in the field of environment and health. She qualified as a transpersonal psychotherapist in 1991 at the Centre for Psychotherapy and Counselling Education in London. She lives in London, England.

== Career ==
Thomas was an early campaigner for evidence-based healthcare. Her early books concentrated on providing information to women who wished to have safe, non-interventionist births. During the time she was Editor of the AIMS Journal, the quarterly magazine of the Association for Improvements in the Maternity Services (AIMS).

In 1992, she began writing for the newsletter What Doctors Don't Tell You, produced by the independent publisher Wallace Press. She moved on to become an editor there and for 12 years was one of its most prolific contributors. In 2003, she became editor of its sister-publication, the consumer magazine Proof!, to which she had been contributing since its inception in 1996. During this time she also contributed regularly to another Wallace Press title, Natural Parent.

In 2004, she began writing the "Behind the Label" column, which exposed risky chemicals in everyday products, for The Ecologist magazine. In 2005, she became The Ecologist's Health Editor and authored some of the magazine's most widely read feature investigations.

By 2007, Thomas had been appointed editor of The Ecologist magazine, a position she held until June 2009 when the print magazine switched to an online format. As editor, she spearheaded the magazine's campaigns, acted as its public face in the media and helped established the Ecologist Film Unit with film partners the international investigations agency Ecostorm. She was also responsible for a major redesign of the magazine. She continued to write the popular "Behind the Label" column until January 2011.

She became Campaign Director for Sir Paul McCartney's "Meat Free Monday" campaign, helping to launch and establish the campaign in the UK. Under her direction the campaign took McCartney to a special plenary session of the European Parliament to speak about the health and environmental benefits of reducing the amount of meat in the typical Western diet. The event in December 2009 was broadcast around the world via the internet.

In 2010, Thomas became Campaign Manager for the "Cows Belong in Fields" campaign at Compassion in World Farming. The campaign aimed to stop the UK's first mega-dairy in the village of Nocton, Lincolnshire, where a planned 8000 high-yielding cows would be reared indoors, on the grounds of risks to animal welfare and the local environment. Nocton Dairies withdrew its plans in February 2011 after overwhelming objections from campaigners, the public, local authorities and the UK's Environment Agency.

In 2010, Thomas was also the host of Deep Fried Planet, a weekly radio programme on London's Resonance FM. She also researched and wrote the report Healthy Planet Eating, which outlined the health and environmental case for eating less meat, for environmental campaigning group Friends of the Earth.

In 2011, she became involved in sustainability and web-based projects for Neal's Yard Remedies, one of the UK's leading organic health and beauty companies. One of these projects is the natural health website NYR Natural News.

Thomas has also produced a web-based tool called "Infrequently Asked Questions", which encourages users to ask more in-depth questions about cultural and personal issues. Over the course of her career Thomas has written many books for adults and children.

Her work has been featured in, and she has written on a wide range of topics for, publications such as The Guardian, The Independent, Here’s Health, Top Santé, Health & Fitness, Geographical and Caduceus.

She has been a regular guest on Anna Raeburn's programme on Talk Radio programme and featured on BBC Radio 4's Costing the Earth and has appeared on programmes for the BBC, ITV, BBC Radio 5 Live, Sky news, RTÉ, Carlton Television, Ireland AM, Granada Talk TV, LBC, and the World Service, among others.

== Accolades ==
- June 2011 – The Cows Belong in Fields campaign won Compassion in World Farming the Observer Ethical Award 2011 for Campaigner of the Year, beating runners up 38 Degrees and Hugh Fearnley-Whittingstall. The award was selected by "a combination of reader votes and an expert panel".
- November 2009 - The Meat Free Monday campaign won a Vegetarian Society Special Achievement Award for its work in promoting a reduced-meat diet.
- October 2007 – the London Evening Standard identified Thomas as one of the 1000 most influential people in London.
- September 2002 – Thomas's book Your Birth Rights was listed at one of the 50 Best Books for New Parents by The Independent newspaper.
- 1998 – Thomas's children's book My Family’s Changing – A First Look at Divorce won the English Association's Best Picture Book, non-fiction, for ages 4–7.

== Books ==
Thomas has written numerous books for both adults and children. Her books have been translated into multiple languages including Spanish, French, Italian, Portuguese, Polish, Russian, Greek, Japanese, Dutch and Turkish.

For adults

- Stuffed: Positive Action to Prevent a Global Food Crisis (Sawdays, 2010). ISBN 1-906136-47-5
- Skin Deep (Rodale 2008). ISBN 1-905744-23-4
- Healthy, Happy Baby (Rodale 2008). ISBN 1-905744-24-2
- The 21st Century is Making You Fat (Gaia 2008). ISBN 1-85675-290-9
- What’s in This Stuff? The Essential Guide to What’s in Really in the Products You Buy (Rodale, 2006). ISBN 1-4050-9549-0
- Under the Weather – How Weather and Climate Affect Our Health (Fusion Press, 2004). ISBN 1-904132-30-8
- Living Dangerously – Are Everyday Toxins Making You Sick? (New Leaf, 2003). ISBN 0-7171-3600-0
- What Works, What Doesn’t – The Guide to Alternative Healthcare (New Leaf, 2002). ISBN 0-7171-3364-8
- Your Birth Rights (Women's Press, 2002) [note this is a revision of Every Woman’s BirthRights]. ISBN 0-7043-4710-5
- Cleaning Yourself to Death – How Safe is Your Home? (New Leaf, 2001). ISBN 0-7171-3162-9
- Alternative Therapies for Pregnancy and Birth (Element, 2000). ISBN 1-86204-727-8
- Pregnancy – The Common Sense Approach (Gill & Macmillan, 1999). ISBN 0-7171-2924-1
- Headaches – The Common Sense Approach (Gill & Macmillan, 1999). ISBN 0-7171-2923-3
- Every Birth is Different (Headline, 1997). ISBN 0-7472-7737-0
- Every Woman’s BirthRights (Thorsons, 1996). ISBN 0-7225-3281-4

For children

- I Can Make a Difference – A First Look at Setting a Good Example (Hodder/Wayland, 2010). ISBN 0-7502-6138-2
- Everyone Matters – A First Look at Respect for Others (Hodder/Wayland, 2010). ISBN 0-7502-6136-6
- Why Do I feel Scared – A First Look at Being Brave (Hodder/Wayland, 2010). ISBN 0-7502-6137-4
- I Can Do it! – A First Look at Perseverance (Hodder/Wayland,2010). ISBN 0-7502-6139-0
- Why Am I So Tired? – A First Look at Childhood Diabetes (Hodder/Wayland, 2008). ISBN 0-7502-5237-5
- I Think I’m Going to Sneeze – A First Look at Allergies (Hodder/Wayland, 2008). ISBN 0-7502-5238-3
- Do I Have to Go to the Dentist? – A First Look at Dental Care (Hodder/Wayand, 2008). ISBN 0-7502-5239-1
- Why is it So Hard to Breathe? – A First Look at Asthma (Hodder/Wayland, 2008). ISBN 0-7502-5236-7
- Do I Have to Go to School? – A First Look at Going to School (Hodder/Wayland, 2006). ISBN 0-340-89452-0
- My Manners Matter – A First Look at Good Manners (Hodder/Wayland, 2006). ISBN 0-340-89453-9
- Do I Have to Go to Hospital? – A First Look at Going to Hospital (Hodder/Wayland, 2006). ISBN 0-340-89451-2
- I’m Telling the Truth – A First Look at Honesty (Hodder/Wayland, 2006). ISBN 0-340-89450-4
- The Skin I’m In – A First Look at Racism (Hodder/Wayland, 2003). ISBN 0-7502-4261-2
- I Can Be Safe – A First Look at Safety (Hodder/Wayland, 2003). ISBN 0-7502-4265-5
- Is it Right to Fight? – A First Look at Conflict (Hodder/Wayland, 2003). ISBN 0-7502-4263-9
- My Parents Picked Me! – A First Look at Adoption (Hodder/Wayland, 2003). ISBN 0-7502-4267-1
- Don’t Call Me Special! – A First Look at Disability (Hodder/Macdonald, 2001). ISBN 0-7502-3555-1
- My Amazing Body – A First Look at Health and Fitness (Hodder/Macdonald, 2001). ISBN 0-7502-3558-6
- My Brother, My Sister and Me – A First Look at Sibling Relationships (Macdonald Young Books, 2000). ISBN 0-7500-2888-2
- Stop Picking On Me! – A First Look at Bullying (Macdonald Young Books, 2000). ISBN 0-7500-2887-4
- I Miss You – A First Look at Death (Hodder/Macdonald, 2000). ISBN 0-7500-3073-9
- My Friends & Me – A First Look at Friendship (Hodder/Macdonald, 2000). ISBN 0-7500-3069-0
- My Amazing Journey – A First Look at Where Babies Come From (Macdonald Young Books, 1998). ISBN 0-7500-2574-3
- My Family’s Changing – A First Look at Family Break-up (Macdonald Young Books, 1998). ISBN 0-7500-2571-9

== Reports ==
- Healthy Planet Eating (Friends of the Earth, 2010).

== Booklets/Guides ==
- You Can Prevent Cancer (Wallace Press, 1999)
- The PROOF! Guide to Alternative First Aid (Wallace Press, 1998)
- Choosing a Home Birth (AIMS, 1998)

== As a contributor ==
- A Slice of Organic Life, Editor: Sheherazade Goldsmith (Dorling Kindersley, 2007). ISBN 1-4053-1775-2
- Failure To Progress – The Contraction of Midwifery (Routledge, 2002). ISBN 0-415-23558-8
- Living Organic, Pat Thomas & Others (Time Life Books, 2001). ISBN 1-57071-680-3
- Your Healthy Heart (Wallace Press, 1999)
- The Guide to Men’s Health (Wallace Press, 1998)
- The Vaccination Bible (Wallace Press, 1998)
- The Guide to Menopause (Wallace Press, 1997)
