= La vita comincia ogni mattina =

- Written by: Terzoli & Vaime
- Original language: Italian
- Genre: Comedy
- Setting: Milan

Premiere
- Date premiered: 1981

La vita comincia ogni mattina (Life begins every morning) is a play by Italian playwrights Terzoli & Vaime. It is set in Milan in 1981.

== Synopsis ==
The protagonist (Gino Bramieri) is Giulio Cogliati a married man, owner of a little factory, (in the play his wife Lucia is played by Carmen Scarpitta), who follows all his habits and his daily routine. Suddenly, his life is turned upside down by the passion for a Brazilian girl (Silvia Regina), much younger than him.

Giulio must decide, in two hours, to pack his bags and leave with Isabel, or stay with Lucia.

The play was performed in 1981, directed by Pietro Garinei, with Gino Bramieri, Carmen Scarpitta, Edi Angelillo, Roberto Bonanni, Sílvia Regina, Gabriella Belli, Antonella Diana, Paola Guadagni, Ivonne La Bozzetta and Paola Marzi.

== Television adaptation ==
The 1983 television adaptation was directed by the same Pietro Garinei that directed the theatre play.
