= Gilbert de Goldschmidt =

French film producer

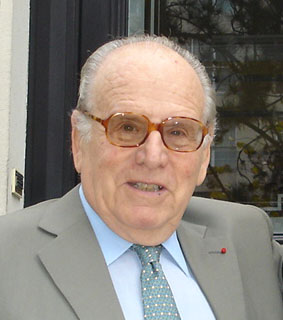
- de Goldschmidt in 2006
- Born: 26 April 1925; Berlin, Germany
- Died: 1 January 2010 (aged 84); Genolier, Switzerland
- Occupation: Producer

Gilbert de Goldschmidt (26 April 1925 - 1 January 2010) was a German-born French film producer and writer.

== Life and career ==
Goldschmidt was born in Berlin to Rudolph Maximilian von Goldschmidt-Rothschild (1881 - 1962) and Betty Lambert (1894-1969). At a young age de Goldschmidt moved to France, where he started his first production company Madeleine Films in 1951. Among his about 40 produced films were Jacques Demy's Palme d'Or winner and Academy Award nominated The Umbrellas of Cherbourg, Raoul Coutard's Academy Award nominated Hoa-Binh, and a number of Yves Robert's successful comedies, notably The Tall Blond Man with One Black Shoe. He also produced TV-commercials, and distributed foreign films in France, including some Monty Python films.

During his career, de Goldschmidt received various honours, including the Legion of Honour, the Ordre des Arts et des Lettres and the Ordre national du Mérite. He served as juror at the 1983 Cannes Film Festival and at the 1988 Venice International Film Festival. He was cousin of the actress Clio Goldsmith.

== Family ==
Goldschmidt's paternal grandfather was Maximilian von Goldschmidt-Rothschild of the Goldschmidt family. His paternal grandmother was Minna Karoline Freiin von Rothschild (1857 - 1903), the daughter of Wilhelm Carl von Rothschild of the Rothschild banking family of Naples. His grand-uncle was the financier Adolphe Goldschmidt. His uncle (father's first-cousin) was British-French politician & hotelier Frank Goldsmith, whose son (Gilbert's second-cousin) was Sir James Goldsmith. Zac & Jemima Goldsmith are his nephew & niece.
