= Carmen Scarpitta =

Italian actress (1933–2008)

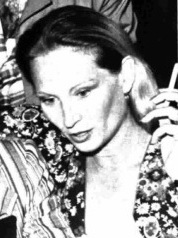
- Carmen Scarpitta (1974)
- Born: 26 May 1933; Hollywood, California, U.S.
- Died: 26 April 2008 (aged 74); Cabo San Lucas, Mexico
- Occupation: Actress
- Years active: 1960–2001

Carmen Scarpitta (26 May 1933 – 26 April 2008) was an Italian stage and film actress. She appeared in 30 films between 1960 and 2001.

Scarpitta was born in Hollywood, California. She debuted on stage in 1960 in Alessandro Manzoni's Adelchis and in Ennio Flaiano's A Martian in Rome, both directed by Vittorio Gassman. During her 40-year career she worked on stage with Carmelo Bene, Luca Ronconi and Luigi Squarzina, and starred in films directed by Federico Fellini, Bernardo Bertolucci, Mauro Bolognini and Luigi Magni.

She died from a gas leak in her house in Cabo San Lucas, Mexico.

== Theatre ==
- Adelchi of Alessandro Manzoni, directed by Vittorio Gassman, (1960).
- Oresteia of Aeschylus, directed by Vittorio Gassman, (1960).
- Un marziano a Roma of Ennio Flaiano, directed by Vittorio Gassman, (1960).
- Right You Are (if you think so) of Luigi Pirandello, directed by Mario Ferrero, (1964).
- L'attenzione of Alberto Moravia, directed by Edmo Fenoglio, (1967).
- Visita alla prova de L'isola purpurea, di Mikhail Bulgakov, directed by Raffaele Maiello, (1968).
- La vita comincia ogni mattina, of Terzoli & Vaime, directed by Pietro Garinei, (1981).

== Filmography ==
Year	Title	Role	Notes
1960	Five Branded Women		
1963	Gidget Goes to Rome	Caviar Party Guest	Uncredited
1966	Pleasant Nights	Friend of Domicilla	
1968	Anzio	Neapolitan girl	
1970	Defeat of the Mafia	Countess Torreguardia	
1973	Il magnate		
1974	L'albero dalle foglie rosa	Gloria, madre di Marco	
1975	Savage Three	Moglie del deputato	
1976	Fellini's Casanova	Madame Charpillon	
1976	Natale in casa d'appuntamento	Marta	
1976	La Orca	Irene	
1976	Frou-frou del tabarin	Contessa Chantal de la Barrière - Charlotte's mother	
1977	Oedipus Orca	Irene	
1977	Beyond Good and Evil	Malvida	
1977	In the Name of the Pope King	La contessa Flaminia	
1978	La Cage aux Folles	Louise Charrier	
1979	Hunted City	Ferro's Sister	
1980	Tranquille donne di campagna	Floriana	
1980	Bello di mamma	Mother of Mimì	
1981	Calderon		
1987	Farewell Moscow		
1989	Lungo il fiume		
1990	Voglia di vivere	Dr. Rosemund	TV movie
2001	Probably Love	Laura	
