= The Ecologist =

Scientific journal

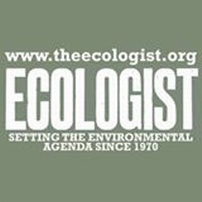
- Editor: Brendan Montague
- Former editors: Zac Goldsmith, Andrew Wasley
- Founder: Edward Goldsmith
- First issue: July 1970
- Final issue Number: July 2009; Vol. 39, No. 6
- Country: England
- Based in: London
- Language: English
- Website: www.theecologist.org
- ISSN: 0012-9631
- OCLC: 263593196

The Ecologist was a British environmental journal/magazine, published from 1970 to 2009. Founded by Edward Goldsmith, it addressed a wide range of environmental subjects and promoted an ecological systems thinking approach through its news stories, investigations and opinion articles. The Ecologist encouraged its readers to tackle global issues on a local scale. After cessation of its print edition in July 2009, The Ecologist continued as an online magazine. In mid-2012, it merged with Resurgence magazine, edited by Satish Kumar, with the first issue of the new Resurgence & Ecologist appearing in print in September 2012. The Ecologist was based in London.

== History ==
The Ecologist emerged from the first wave of environmental awareness that followed the seminal book Silent Spring by Rachel Carson, which highlighted the dangers of bio-accumulative pesticides within food chains, and that culminated in the first United Nations Conference on the Human Environment at Stockholm in 1972. This period also saw the establishment of leading environmental organisations such as Greenpeace and Friends of the Earth.

The Ecologist was created in 1970 by Edward Goldsmith as a forum for himself and other academics to publish papers that were deemed too radical to be published in other magazines or the mainstream press. It progressed from a small academic journal with an initial circulation of only 400, to one of the world’s leading environmental affairs magazines with monthly sales (including subscriptions and newsstand) of 20,000.

As the magazine grew, its coverage became broader and its style more journalistic. The Ecologist covered topics including food, climate change, news, corporate affairs, chain stores, chemicals, pesticides and the corporatisation of the mass media. It was accused of being both left and right wing in its agenda, but did not follow the doctrine of any specific movement. It claimed to help readers ‘rethink basic assumptions’ about the world.

On 8 April 2009, The Ecologist announced that it was relaunching solely online and that the July issue would be its last print edition. The website launched on 19 June 2009. Publication of The Ecologist's online, monthly newsletters ceased with the May 2012 issue.

In June 2012 The Ecologist merged with Resurgence Magazine. A new, merged Resurgence & Ecologist print publication appeared in September 2012. The Ecologist continues to publish online with new articles added daily.

As global concern and campaigning around climate change has increased, The Ecologist has focused more firmly on climate change and its consequences, becoming more 'activist' in its approach and orienting its content towards campaigners for climate justice. Its 2023-6 Strategy document outlines:

The environment movement has, because of climate breakdown, become increasingly aware and concerned about the impacts of the fossil fuel economy on society and on nature. The Ecologist provides information that is vital to all the campaigns attempting to end the fossil fuel economy and usher in an era of renewable energy and regenerative alternatives from degrowth policies to Green New Deals.

It has also developed a more explicit anti-capitalist line than under Goldsmith's leadership, with its 2023-6 Strategy document arguing: "the impacts of unregulated capitalist economies on the natural environment globally are devastating, representing an existential threat to human societies and life itself in the medium to long term."

== Publishing landmarks ==
In 1972, The Ecologist published A Blueprint for Survival (1972), to which an entire issue was dedicated. Writing in the Guardian newspaper, former contributor Fred Pearce described it as "a radical green manifesto that went on to sell 750,000 copies and kept the magazine financially afloat for years." A recommendation of the Blueprint led directly to the creation of the PEOPLE Party which became the Ecology Party and then the Green Party (UK). A Blueprint for Survival follows through the consequences of what happens when humans disrupt the ecosystems in which they exist. It explains that when these systems are disrupted, they alter other ecosystems all over the world. Written in an age before climate change was understood, A Blueprint for Survival stands as one of the earliest forecasts of many of the environmental problems the world faces today.

In the 'Monsanto' issue of September 1998, The Ecologist assembled a selection of articles critical of agri-business giant Monsanto’s environmental record. The Ecologist's printing firm at the time, Penwells, feared libel litigation from Monsanto and pulped the 14,000 copies of the edition. The issue was ultimately printed by a small London printer and went on to become the most-sold issue of The Ecologist ever.

== Key people ==
Edward Goldsmith, founder of The Ecologist, was born in 1928 in Paris and was the first major influence on the publication. With the inheritance left to him by his father, Major Frank Goldsmith, Edward fulfilled his idea of creating a magazine which doubled as a platform for academic writers who were concerned about the world around them. Thirty-nine years later The Ecologist was still a source of information on issues such as climate change, globalisation and sustainable economics. Edward Goldsmith was the editor from its foundation in 1970 until 1990, and then again from 1997 until 1998 whilst supporting his nephew, Zac Goldsmith.

Former editors include Nicholas Hildyard, Peter Bunyard, Patrick McCully, Sarah Sexton, Simon Fairlie, Paul Kingsnorth (deputy editor), Malcolm Tait (managing editor), Harry Ram (managing editor), Jeremy Smith and Pat Thomas.

When Hildyard left in 1997, Edward Goldsmith’s initial intention was that the Board of the International Society for Ecology and Culture (ISEC), directed by Helena Norberg-Hodge, should manage The Ecologist. Instead, Zac Goldsmith, who was then working for ISEC, became editor, as the other members of ISEC were occupied with other projects.

Zac Goldsmith, born in 1975, joined at 22 years old as an intern before becoming editor of The Ecologist.

In the 10 years that Zac Goldsmith was editor, he developed The Ecologist into a more conventional-looking publication that could compete visually with other current affairs titles, while still maintaining its diverse content. In 2005 he became advisor to Conservative leader David Cameron's Quality of Life Policy Group, and in 2010 became Member of Parliament for Richmond. His influence continued in supporting The Ecologist financially but Goldsmith stepped down as editor in June 2007, saying, "The magazine has to remain impartial and feel free to have a go at the Government and at the Conservatives. So I can't both be the editor and a parliamentary candidate."

Andrew Wasley, who joined the organisation in 2010, edited The Ecologist's website and newsletters. Oliver Tickell was appointed as the editor in October 2013. Brendan Montague became the editor in October 2017.

Contributors to The Ecologist have included Jonathon Porritt, Mark Lynas, Paul Kingsnorth, who was the magazine's deputy editor from 1999 to 2001, Tom Hodgkinson, Joss Garman, Chris Busby and Georgina Downs.

== Circulation ==
In its magazine format, The Ecologist had an average circulation of 20,000 per issue. In its online incarnation, in addition to the website there was a weekly e-newsletter and a monthly subscriber PDF newsletter, the last issue of which was published in May 2012. The Ecologist has a Facebook page at ‘The Ecologist – Official Page’ and a Twitter account at ‘the_ecologist’ with over 100,000 followers.

== See also ==
- Environmental direct action in the United Kingdom
- Environmental inequality in the United Kingdom
- Environmental issues in the United Kingdom
