= Peter Roberts =

Peter Roberts may refer to:

- Peter Roberts (priest) (c.1760–1819), Welsh Anglican divine and antiquary
- Sir Peter Roberts, 3rd Baronet (1912–1985), British Conservative Party MP
- Peter Scawen Watkinson Roberts (1917–1979), English recipient of the Victoria Cross
- Peter Roberts (activist) (1924–2006), British animal welfare activist and the founder of Compassion in World Farming
- Peter Roberts (cricketer) (born 1952), Australian cricketer
- Peter Roberts (councillor), British politician, Leader of Rochdale Borough Council from 1997–2006
- Peter Roberts (inventor), inventor of the quick release socket wrench
- Peter McLaren Roberts (1927–2003), former Canadian ambassador to Romania
- Peter Llewelyn Roberts, Australian ambassador to East Timor
