= Thomas Le Blanc =

English lawyer and academic (1774–1843)

Thomas Le Blanc, F.S.A. (b Cavenham 3 January 1774 - d Northaw 23 January 1843) was a lawyer and academic in the first half of the nineteenth century.

Le Blanc was educated at Trinity Hall, Cambridge, graduating LL.B in 1795 and LL.D in 1816. He was elected Fellow of Trinity Hall in 1800, and its Master in 1815. He was Vice-Chancellor of the University of Cambridge from 1824 to 1825.
