= A Blueprint for Survival =

Environmentalist text

- Author: Edward Goldsmith and Robert Allen
- Subject: Environmentalism
- Publisher: Ecosystems Ltd.
- Publication date: January 1972
- ISBN: 978-0140522952

A Blueprint for Survival was an influential environmentalist text that drew attention to the urgency and magnitude of environmental problems.

First published as a special edition of The Ecologist in January 1972, it was later published in book form and went on to sell more than 750,000 copies.

The Blueprint was signed by over thirty of the leading scientists of the day—including Sir Julian Huxley, Sir Frank Fraser Darling, Sir Peter Medawar, E. J. Mishan and Sir Peter Scott. It was largely written by Edward Goldsmith and Robert Allen (with contributions from John Davoll and Sam Lawrence of the Conservation Society, and Michael Allaby) who argued for a radically restructured society in order to prevent what the authors referred to as "the breakdown of society and the irreversible disruption of the life-support systems on this planet".

It recommended that people live in small, decentralised and largely de-industrialised communities. Some of the reasons given for this were that:

- it is too difficult to enforce moral behaviour in a large community
- agricultural and business practices are more likely to be ecologically sound in smaller communities
- people feel more fulfilled in smaller communities
- reducing an area's population reduces the environmental impact

The authors used tribal societies as their model which, it was claimed, were characterised by their small, human-scale communities, low-impact technologies, successful population controls, sustainable resource management, holistic and ecologically integrated worldviews, and a high degree of social cohesion, physical health, psychological well-being and spiritual fulfilment of their members.

== In popular culture ==
In Enys Men, a 2022 British experimental horror film set in 1973, a wildlife volunteer making daily observations of rare flowers on an uninhabited Cornish island is frequently shown reading A Blueprint for Survival. The book cover includes a quote from the Sunday Times stating that "nothing seems quite the same any more", which nods to the film's ambiguous narrative and chronology.

Kim Trainor's poetry collection A Blueprint for Survival (Guernica Editions, 2024) alludes to this book and considers blueprints for the survival of human and more than human kin.

== See also ==
- Limits to Growth
- Transition Towns
