= Edi Angelillo =

Italian actress, television personality and singer

- Born: Edilberta Angelillo; 7 September 1961 (age 63); Venice, Italy
- Occupations: Actress; singer

Edi Angelillo (born 7 September 1961) is an Italian actress and singer. She is sometimes credited as Edy Angelillo.

== Life and career ==
Born Edilberta Angelillo in Venice, she is the daughter of singers and stage artists who performed with the name Franco & Regina.

Angelillo studied dance, mime and acting, and at 19 years old, in 1979, she made her film debut in Maurizio Nichetti's Ratataplan. The same year, Angelillo debuted on television as an assistant in Rai 1 variety show Domenica in, and recorded her first single as a singer. In 1981, she acted in theatre the play La vita comincia ogni mattina, with Gino Bramieri.

In 1984, after having been an assistant of Pippo Baudo at the Sanremo Music Festival, she focused her activities on stage.

In 1997 she was nominated to the David di Donatello for best supporting actress thanks to her performance in La bruttina stagionata.
