= Patrick McCully =

Patrick McCully is a US-based environmentalist, writer, and solar advocate and entrepreneur. Since 2010 he has been executive director of Black Rock Solar, a non-profit company affiliated with the Burning Man festival, that is focused on installing solar power and doing lighting efficiency projects for non-profits, schools, Native American tribes, and municipalities in Nevada. He was the formerly executive director of the Berkeley (California)-based International Rivers (formerly known as International Rivers Network, or IRN), an advocacy group that supports communities around the world opposing destructive river development projects, and promotes sustainable and equitable freshwater management and energy policies.

McCully is originally from Northern Ireland, and is a graduate of the University of Nottingham, England. He was co-editor of the UK journal The Ecologist, and editor for a Uruguayan information service for NGOs.

McCully has written extensively on water, energy, climate, carbon trading, human rights and development policies and given presentations at numerous conferences and universities around the world including Yale, Harvard, UC Berkeley, Stanford, Columbia, Universidad Nacional Autónoma de México, Universitat Autònoma de Barcelona, Universidade Federal do Rio de Janeiro, Makerere University (Uganda), University of Cape Town, and Kyoto University. He represented international advocacy NGOs on the Steering Committee of the UN Environment Programme’s Dams and Development Project.

McCully's is author of Silenced Rivers: The Ecology and Politics of Large Dams (St Martin’s Press 1996 and 2001) which has been translated into five languages and was described by Indian author Arundhati Roy as a "truly dazzling book".
