= Adolphe Goldschmidt =

German businessman and art collector

- Born: Adolphe Benedict Hayum Goldschmidt; 1838; Frankfurt
- Died: 6 April 1918 (aged 79–80); London
- Occupation: Banker
- Known for: Goldschmidt bank
- Spouse: Alice Emma Moses Merton
- Parent(s): Benedikt Hayum Goldschmidt; Jeannette Kann

Adolphe Benedict Hayum Goldschmidt (1838 – 6 April 1918) was co-inheritor of the Goldschmidt family's bank in Frankfurt am Main, Germany.

== Life ==
His father was Benedikt Hayum Goldschmidt, founder of the bank B.H. Goldschmidt and consul to the Grand Duke of Tuscany. One of the richest families in Europe, in 1900, after their father's death, he and his brother, Maximilian decided to close the bank and leave Frankfurt. While Maximilian, the later Maximilian von Goldschmidt-Rothschild, moved to Berlin, Adolphe went first to Paris and then to London, where he bought a large house in Mayfair. He also bought a 2,500 acre (10 km^{2}) country estate in Cavenham, Suffolk. Adolphe and his wife Alice became collectors of art. They acquired many expensive pieces including the furniture of Louis XV and Louis XVI.

Adolphe did not want to go back into banking, but he became a sleeping partner in London merchant bank Helbert, Wagg & Co. (estab. 1848, acquired by Schroders in 1962) and invested in bonds. He also held interests in the Central Mining Investment Corporation, which controlled mines in South Africa and had interests in the De Beers diamond and oil business.

Adolphe was the father of Conservative politician and hotelier Frank Goldsmith, who anglicized his name to "Goldsmith", and grandfather of both tycoon James Goldsmith and environmentalist Edward Goldsmith. Adolphe's great-grandchildren include Zac and Jemima Goldsmith.
