= Stowmarket (constituency) =

Parliamentary constituency in the United Kingdom, 1885–1918

Coordinates: 52.19°N 0.99°E

- Former county constituency for the House of Commons
- County: Suffolk
- Major settlements: Stowmarket

1885–1918
- Seats: One
- Created from: East Suffolk and West Suffolk
- Replaced by: Bury St Edmunds

Stowmarket was a parliamentary constituency centred on the town of Stowmarket in Suffolk. It returned one Member of Parliament (MP) to the House of Commons of the Parliament of the United Kingdom, elected by the first past the post voting system.

== History ==
The North-Western or Stowmarket Division was one of five single-member county divisions of the Parliamentary County of Suffolk created by the Redistribution of Seats Act 1885 to replace the existing two 2-member divisions for the 1885 general election. It was formed from parts of the Western Division of Suffolk and included the towns of Stowmarket and Newmarket. It was abolished by the Representation of the People Act 1918 when the majority of the Division was absorbed into the new Bury St Edmunds Division of West Suffolk, with a small area in the east, including Stowmarket itself, transferred to the Eye Division of East Suffolk.

== Boundaries ==
- The Municipal Borough of Bury St Edmunds;
- The Sessional Divisions of Blackbourn, Lackford, and Stowmarket;
- Parts of the Sessional Divisions of Newmarket, Thedwestry, and Thingoe; and
- The part of the Municipal Borough of Thetford in the county of Suffolk.

As Bury St Edmunds formed a separate Parliamentary Borough, only non-resident freeholders of the Borough were entitled to vote in this constituency.

== Members of Parliament ==
Election	Member	Party
1885	Felix Cobbold	Liberal
1886	Edward Greene	Conservative
1891 by-election	Sydney Stern	Liberal
1895	Ian Malcolm	Conservative
1906	George Hardy	Liberal
Jan. 1910	Frank Goldsmith	Conservative
1918	constituency abolished	

== Elections ==
=== Elections in the 1880s ===
Felix Cobbold

General election 1885: Stowmarket
Party	Candidate	Votes	%	±%
Liberal	Felix Cobbold	4,606	57.0	
Conservative	Thomas Thornhill	3,475	43.0	
Majority		1,131	14.0	
Turnout		8,081	76.3	
Registered electors		10,587		
Liberal win (new seat)				

General election 1886: Stowmarket
Party	Candidate	Votes	%	±%
Conservative	Edward Greene	3,906	53.7	+10.7
Liberal	Edward Buxton	3,363	46.3	−10.7
Majority		543	7.4	N/A
Turnout		7,269	68.7	−7.6
Registered electors		10,587		
Conservative gain from Liberal		Swing	+10.7	

=== Elections in the 1890s ===
Greene's death caused a by-election.

1891 Stowmarket by-election
Party	Candidate	Votes	%	±%
Liberal	Sydney Stern	4,346	51.3	+5.0
Conservative	Edward Greene	4,132	48.7	−5.0
Majority		214	2.6	N/A
Turnout		8,478	74.5	+5.8
Registered electors		11,375		
Liberal gain from Conservative		Swing	+5.0	

General election 1892: Stowmarket
Party	Candidate	Votes	%	±%
Liberal	Sydney Stern	4,630	50.8	+4.5
Conservative	Gerald Cadogan	4,486	49.2	−4.5
Majority		144	1.6	N/A
Turnout		9,116	82.5	+13.8
Registered electors		11,045		
Liberal gain from Conservative		Swing	+4.5	

General election 1895: Stowmarket
Party	Candidate	Votes	%	±%
Conservative	Ian Malcolm	5,144	58.2	+9.0
Liberal	Henry de Rosenbach Walker	3,701	41.8	−9.0
Majority		1,443	16.4	N/A
Turnout		8,845	80.8	−1.7
Registered electors		10,942		
Conservative gain from Liberal		Swing	+9.0	

=== Elections in the 1900s ===
General election 1900: Stowmarket
Party	Candidate	Votes	%	±%
Conservative	Ian Malcolm	4,431	59.1	+0.9
Liberal	JC Horobin	3,068	40.9	−0.9
Majority		1,363	18.2	+1.8
Turnout		7,499	70.4	−10.4
Registered electors		10,651		
Conservative hold		Swing	+0.9	

George Hardy

General election 1906: Stowmarket
Party	Candidate	Votes	%	±%
Liberal	George Hardy	4,801	51.1	+10.2
Conservative	Walter Guinness	4,588	48.9	−10.2
Majority		213	2.2	N/A
Turnout		9,389	85.6	+15.2
Registered electors		10,971		
Liberal gain from Conservative		Swing	+10.2	

=== Elections in the 1910s ===
General election January 1910: Stowmarket
Party	Candidate	Votes	%	±%
Conservative	Frank Goldsmith	5,311	53.2	+4.3
Liberal	George Hardy	4,666	46.8	−4.3
Majority		645	6.4	N/A
Turnout		9,977	89.2	+3.6
Registered electors		11,190		
Conservative gain from Liberal		Swing	+4.3	

General election December 1910: Stowmarket
Party	Candidate	Votes	%	±%
Conservative	Frank Goldsmith	4,995	51.0	−2.2
Liberal	Robert Leatham Barclay	4,804	49.0	+2.2
Majority		191	2.0	−4.4
Turnout		9,799	87.6	−1.6
Registered electors		11,190		
Conservative hold		Swing	−2.2	

General Election 1914–15:

Another General Election was required to take place before the end of 1915. The political parties had been making preparations for an election to take place and by July 1914, the following candidates had been selected;

- Unionist: Frank Goldsmith
- Liberal: E. R. Hollond
