= Honey (1981 film) =

1981 film by Gianfranco Angelucci

- Theatrical release poster
- Directed by: Gianfranco Angelucci
- Written by: Enrique U. Herrera; Liliane Betti; Gianfranco Angelucci
- Starring: Clio Goldsmith; Catherine Spaak; Fernando Rey
- Cinematography: Jaime Deu Casas; Erico Menczer
- Edited by: Roberto Perpignani
- Music by: Riz Ortolani
- Release date: 1981
- Language: Italian

Honey (Italian: Miele di donna) is a 1981 Italian drama film directed by Gianfranco Angelucci. It stars Clio Goldsmith, Catherine Spaak, and Fernando Rey.

== Plot ==
A writer compels a publisher to read her manuscript novel that tells the story of her first erotic adventures, under the name Anny.

== Cast ==
- Clio Goldsmith as Anny
- Catherine Spaak as writer
- Fernando Rey as Editor
- Donatella Damiani as The Landlady
- Nieves Navarro
- Lino Troisi
- Adriana Russo as Inés
- Giuseppe Pennese
- Francisca Fernández

== Release ==
The film was released on Blu-ray in the United States for the first time on May 16, 2023.
