= George Hardy (Liberal politician) =

English businessman and politician

George Alexander Hardy

George Alexander Hardy (29 December 1851 – 2 October 1920) was an English businessman and Liberal Party politician who served for many years as a councillor in South London, and briefly as a Member of Parliament (MP) for the Stowmarket division of Suffolk.

Hardy was born in the Islington district of North London, and went into business in the City of London. He was a member of the Greenwich Vestry, and later served as a councillor on Camberwell Borough Council. In the March 1901 elections for the London County Council, Hardy was elected as a Progressive Party councillor for the Dulwich division of Camberwell. He was re-elected in 1904, but at the 1907 elections, the Municipal Reform Party made sweeping gains and Hardy lost his seat on the council.

He was elected at the 1906 general election as the Member of Parliament (MP) for Stowmarket division of Suffolk. At that time he was a deacon of the Camberwell Green Congregational Church, president of the south-east London Free Church Council, chairman of the Dulwich Society of Public Morality and a member of the London Missionary Society.

The Times reported in January 1910 that although he was "a good worker and a good speaker", Hardy was likely to lose the seat at the January 1910 election to his unionist opponent Frank Goldsmith, who had been working hard to cultivate the support of agricultural workers. Hardy's majority in 1906 had been only 2.2% of the votes, and Goldsmith took the seat on a swing of 4.3%.

After his defeat, Hardy did not stand again in Stowmarket, but on 15 November 1910 he was adopted as one of the two Liberal candidates for the borough of Bath, a marginal constituency where the Liberals had lost both of the two seats in January 1910. At the general election, in December 1910, the Conservatives held both seats.

He stood for the London County Council again at the 1913 elections, this time in Stepney, but did not win a seat. However he was nominated by the Progressive Party as an alderman, and at the new Council's first meeting on 13 March 1913, he was elected to serve as an alderman until 1919. He was elected again as an alderman in 1919, but died the following year at his home on Champion Hill in East Dulwich, aged 68.

Parliament of the United Kingdom
Preceded by Ian Malcolm	Member of Parliament for Stowmarket; 1906 – January 1910	Succeeded by Frank Goldsmith
