= Il magnate =

- Directed by: Giovanni Grimaldi
- Written by: Giovanni Grimaldi
- Starring: Lando Buzzanca; Rosanna Schiaffino
- Cinematography: Angelo Lotti
- Edited by: Daniele Alabiso
- Music by: Enrico Simonetti
- Release date: 1973
- Country: Italy
- Language: Italian

Il magnate (The Tycoon) is a 1973 Italian comedy film written and directed by Giovanni Grimaldi.

== Plot ==
Furio Cicerone, a large Sicilian entrepreneur who came from the ranks, finds himself hindered by a loan from a bank due to an indispensable assessment. The large sum requested by him is available only after five days from the assessment, while he needs it immediately to prevent his employment contract from being canceled; then he turns to an acquaintance, Gianni, who however places conditions on him to help him.

The conditions imposed by Gianni are those of being able to woo Clara, Furio's wife and eventually have a sexual relationship with her; all without Furio intervening. Furio, having his hands tied, reluctantly accepts; Clara, feeling overshadowed, decides to play along with the two men.

Clara, wanting to teach both of them a lesson, makes them believe she is faithful and foolish at the same time. Gianni, with a devious move, manages to extend the duration of the contract to buy time; despite this expedient, her shrewdness is useless, because Clara realizes that Gianni does not intend to respect the agreed terms. Clara, seeing Furio begging Gianni to stop with these absurdities, realizes that her husband is willing to go broke rather than have a cheating wife.

Clara, however, still wants to give a lesson to Furio, in fact she tells him that she wants to leave him alone for a period of time because she wants him to reflect on the fact that love and affections are not barter goods or buying and selling.

Furio, furious, he drives his car and voluntarily collides with Gianni's car.

== Cast ==
- Lando Buzzanca as Furio Cicerone
- Rosanna Schiaffino as Clelia
- Jean-Pierre Cassel as Gianni
- Gino Pagnani as Police Commissioner
- Carmen Scarpitta as Rita

== See also ==
- List of Italian films of 1973
