= Savage Three =

- Italian theatrical release poster
- Directed by: Vittorio Salerno
- Written by: Vittorio Salerno; Ernesto Gastaldi
- Cinematography: Giulio Albonico
- Music by: Franco Campanino
- Distributed by: Titanus
- Release date: 20 September 1975 (Italy)
- Language: Italian

Savage Three (Italian: Fango bollente, also known as Hot Mud) is a 1975 Italian poliziottesco-drama film written and directed by Vittorio Salerno.

== Plot ==
Set in Italy in the mid-1970s, Ovidio Mainardi is by all appearances a quiet clerk in a large computer company. The monotony of the work and the existential loneliness of his marriage push Ovidio, along with two other friends, to embark upon a cynical and sadistic spree of violence.

== Cast ==
- Enrico Maria Salerno: Inspector Santagà
- Joe Dallesandro: Ovidio Mainardi
- Martine Brochard: Alba
- Gianfranco De Grassi: Giacomo Boatta
- Guido De Carli: Pepe
- Carmen Scarpitta: Raped Woman
- Enzo Garinei: Director of the Research Centre
- Sal Borghese: Keeper

== Release ==
The film was released in Italy on September 20, 1975
