= Clio Goldsmith =

French actress

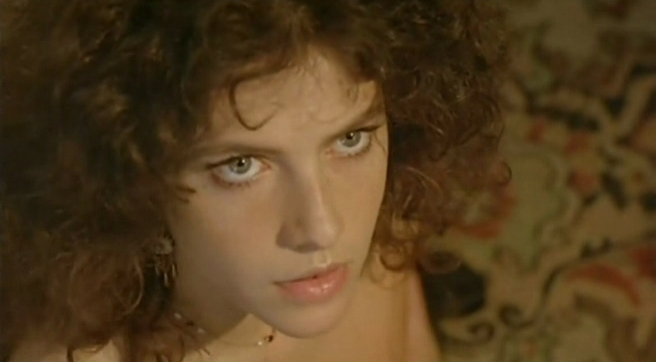
- Goldsmith in 1981
- Occupation: Actress
- Years active: 1980–1986
- Spouses: Carlo Alessandro Puri Negri (m. 1982; div. 1985) Mark Shand (m. 1990; div. 2009)
- Children: 2
- Parent(s): Edward Goldsmith; Gillian Marion Pretty
- Family: Goldsmith

Clio Goldsmith is a French former actress, who had a career in the early 1980s in French and Italian films where she was often cast as a femme fatale. She is a member of the prominent Goldsmith family through her father ecologist Edward Goldsmith. Goldsmith was married to British travel writer Mark Shand, thus a former sister-in-law of Queen Camilla.

== Life and career ==
She began acting in the 1980 movie The Cricket of Alberto Lattuada. Alongside Virna Lisi and Anthony Franciosa, she played a fun-loving girl ending up as prostitute. In 1981, she played prostitute Clemence in Mauro Bolognini's The Lady of the Camellias together with Isabelle Huppert. In Plein sud, she vows she will take up with the first fool she sees, seducing Patrick Dewaere.

In 1982, the title role in the comedy Bankers Also Have Souls earned her some international fame. The Michel Lang movie which was produced by her cousin Gilbert de Goldschmidt featured Pierre Mondy and Claudia Cardinale. Goldsmith plays a beautiful call girl, a gift to a retiring banker from his colleagues. After two other roles, and having appeared twice in an Italian adult entertainment magazine Playmen, she retired from acting.

From 1982 to 1985 she was married to Italian entrepreneur Carlo Alessandro Puri Negri (born 1952), an heir of the Pirelli family. They had a daughter, Talitha. In 1990 she married British author Mark Shand, brother of Queen Camilla and they had a daughter, Ayesha. Shand confirmed in 2010 that the couple were divorced.

== Filmography ==
- 1980: The Cricket (La cicala)
- 1980: The Lady of the Camellias
- 1981: Honey (Miele di donna)
- 1981: Heat of Desire (Plein sud)
- 1981: La caduta degli angeli ribelli
- 1982: Miss Right (La donna giusta)
- 1982: Le Grand Pardon
- 1982: Bankers Also Have Souls (Le Cadeau)
- 1984: ...e la vita continua (TV miniseries)
- 1986: Tug of Love (L'étincelle )
