= Frank Goldsmith =

British politician (1878–1967)

Member of Parliament for Stowmarket
- In office 15 January 1910 – 14 December 1918
- Preceded by: George Hardy
- Succeeded by: Constituency abolished

Personal details
- Born: Franck Adolphe Benedict Goldschmidt; 22 November 1878 Frankfurt, German Empire
- Died: 14 February 1967 (aged 88) Paris, France
- Party: Conservative
- Spouse: Marcelle Moullier (m. 1929)
- Children: Edward Goldsmith; James Goldsmith
- Parent(s): Adolphe Benedict Hayum Goldschmidt; Alice Emma Moses Merton
- Relatives: See Goldschmidt family
- Education: Magdalen College, Oxford
- Profession: Barrister

Military service
- Allegiance: United Kingdom
- Branch/service: British Army
- Years of service: 1908–1918
- Rank: Major
- Unit: Duke of Yorks Own Loyal Suffolk Hussars
- Battles/wars: First World War

Francis Benedict Hyam Goldsmith (22 November 1878 – 14 February 1967) was a British Conservative Party politician who served as a Member of Parliament (MP) from 1910 to 1918. He served in World War I. In 1918, he moved to France, where he entered the hotel business, building a large portfolio of hotels.

== Life and career ==
He was born Franck Adolphe Benedict Goldschmidt in 1878 in Frankfurt into the German Jewish Goldschmidt family. He was the son of multi-millionaire Adolphe Benedict Hayum Goldschmidt, who permanently moved to London in 1895, and Alice Emma Moses Merton (1835–1898), daughter of Joseph Benjamin Moses aka Moses Merton. His grandfather was banker Benedict Hayum Salomon Goldschmidt, founder of the B.H. Goldschmidt Bank and consul to the Grand Duke of Tuscany.

Frank grew up on his family's 2,500-acre (10 km^{2}) country estate in Cavenham, Suffolk. Educated at Magdalen College, Oxford, he gained an honours degree in law and was called to Bar by the Inner Temple in 1902. He was gazetted a lieutenant in the Suffolk Yeomanry in 1908.

In 1903, he was elected to Westminster City Council, remaining a member for four years. In 1904, he was elected a member of London County Council representing St Pancras South with W. H. H. Gastrell as Municipal Reformers, having defeated both George Bernard Shaw and Sir William Geary, who were standing as Progressives. From 1904 to 1910, Goldsmith was active on many committees showing great interest in education and special schooling, becoming whip of the Municipal Reform Party. He was also involved in many Jewish charities, assisting in the organisations involved in the emigration of Jews from the Russian Empire and became a member of the emigration committee of the Jewish Board of Guardians.

At the January 1910 general election, Goldsmith was elected as Conservative MP for the Stowmarket division of Suffolk, close to his family home of Cavenham Park. Although remaining an MP until 1918, his political career was ended by anti-German hysteria during World War I. During the war he served in Gallipoli and Palestine with the Suffolk Yeomanry, a part of the 54th (East Anglian) Infantry Division.

After the war Goldsmith moved to France, where he set up a hotel business. He married Marcelle Moullier in June 1929. Goldsmith eventually built up a portfolio of 48 hotels, including the Hôtel de Paris in Monte Carlo, the Carlton in Cannes and the Lotti in Paris. He was director of the Savoy Hotel company for many years and one of the founders of the King David Hotel in Jerusalem. He was Chevalier of the Légion d'honneur.

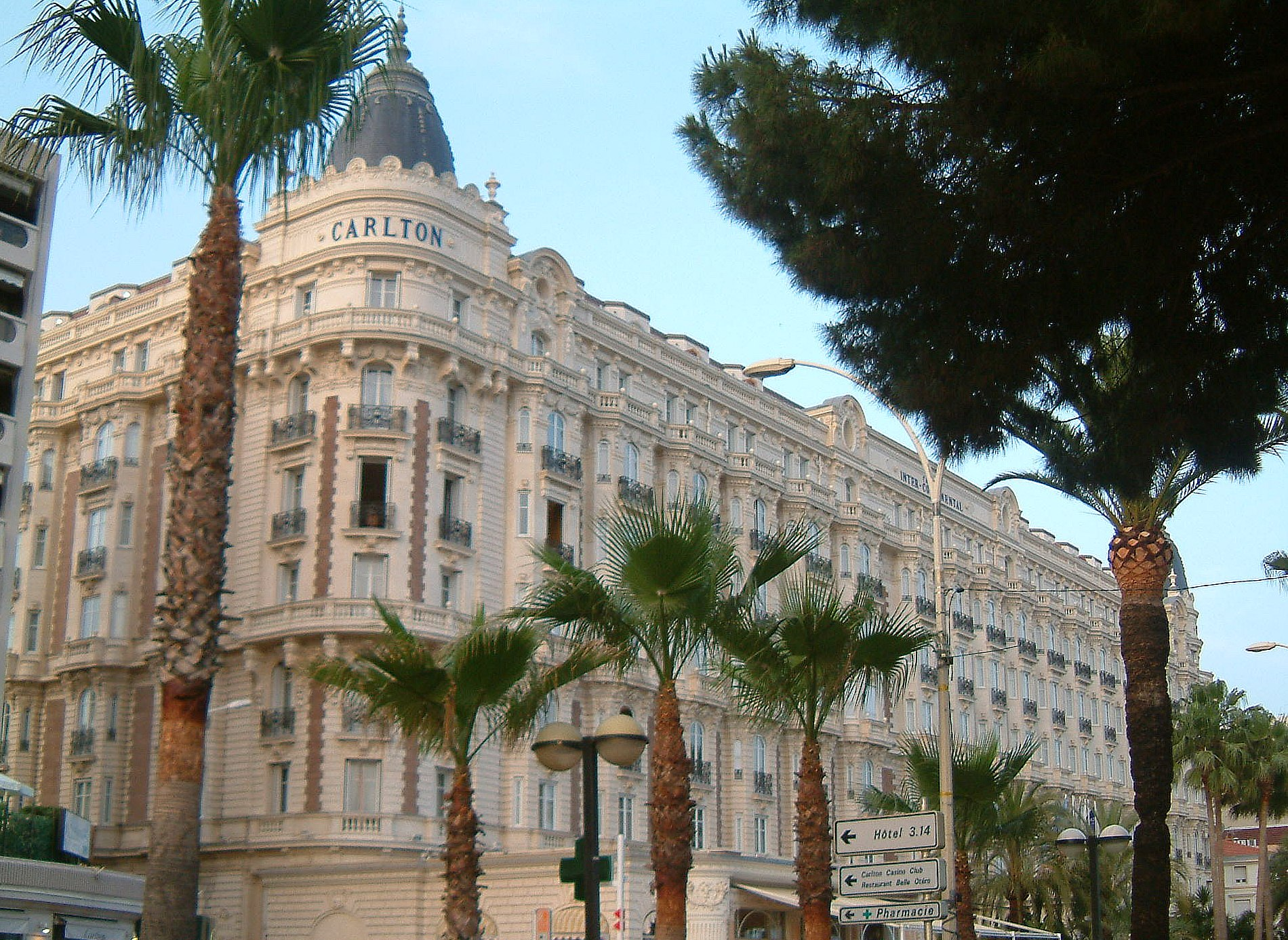
The Carlton, Cannes

He died in Paris on 14 February 1967, leaving a widow and two sons, Edward Goldsmith, an environmentalist and eco-philosopher, and James Goldsmith, businessman and founder of the Euro-sceptic Referendum Party. His grandson, Zac Goldsmith, was a Conservative MP.

Parliament of the United Kingdom
Preceded by George Hardy	Member of Parliament for Stowmarket; 1910 – 1918	Constituency abolished
