= Edward Goldsmith =

Anglo-French environmentalist and writer (1928–2009)

- Born: Edward René David Goldsmith; 8 November 1928; Paris, France
- Died: 21 August 2009 (aged 80); Siena, Italy
- Occupations: Environmentalist, philosopher, publisher
- Spouse(s): Gillian Marion Pretty (divorced); Katherine Victoria James
- Children: 5, including Clio Goldsmith
- Parent(s): Frank Goldsmith; Marcelle Mouiller
- Family: Goldsmith
- Awards: Right Livelihood Award
- Website: www.edwardgoldsmith.org

Edward René David Goldsmith (8 November 1928 – 21 August 2009), widely known as Teddy Goldsmith, was an Anglo-French environmentalist, writer and philosopher.

He was a member of the prominent Goldsmith family, the eldest son of Major Frank Goldsmith, and elder brother of the financier James Goldsmith. Edward Goldsmith was also the founding editor and publisher of The Ecologist. Known for his outspoken views opposing industrial society and economic development, he expressed a strong sympathy for the ways and values of traditional peoples.

He co-authored the influential A Blueprint for Survival with Robert Allen, becoming a founding member of the political party "People" (later renamed the Green Party), itself largely inspired by the Blueprint. Goldsmith's more conservative view of environmentalism put him at odds with socialist currents of thought which came to dominate within the Green Party.

A deep ecologist and systems theorist, Goldsmith was an early proponent of the Gaia hypothesis, having previously developed a similar cybernetic concept of a self-regulating biosphere.

A talented after-dinner speaker and raconteur, Goldsmith was an articulate spokesman and campaigner, receiving a number of awards for his work protecting the natural world and highlighting the importance and plight of indigenous peoples, including an honorary Right Livelihood Award and the Chevalier de la Legion d'Honneur.

== Early life ==
Goldsmith (widely known as Teddy) was born in Paris in 1928 to a German Jewish father, Frank Goldsmith, and French mother, Marcelle Mouiller.

He entered Millfield School, Somerset, as a grammar student, and he later graduated with honours in Philosophy, Politics, and Economics at Magdalen College, Oxford (1947–1950). While studying at Oxford, Goldsmith rejected the reductionist and compartmentalised ideas taught at the time, and he sought a more holistic worldview with which to study societies and the problems facing the world at large.

After fulfilling his National Service as a British Intelligence Officer in Hamburg and Berlin, he involved himself unsuccessfully in a number of business ventures and devoted most of his spare time to the study of the subjects that were to preoccupy him for the rest of his life.

Throughout the 1960s, he spent time travelling the world with his close friend, John Aspinall, witnessing at first hand the destruction of traditional societies. He concluded that the spread of economic development and its accompanying industrialisation, far from being progressive as claimed, was actually the root cause of social and environmental destruction.

== Work ==
=== Primitive People's Fund ===
In London, at meetings of the Primitive People's Fund (the committee that founded Survival International), Goldsmith teamed up with the fund's treasurer Robert Prescott-Allen, the explorer Jean Liedloff, and a writer from World Medicine, Peter Bunyard, to found The Ecologist in 1969.

=== "Theory of a Unified Science" ===
After rejecting what he saw as the excessively reductionist and compartmentalised approach of mainstream academia, he spent much of his time researching and developing his own theories for the unification of the sciences. The Theory of a Unified Science was heavily influenced by cybernetics, as well as the General Systems Theory of Ludwig von Bertalanffy, the holism of the early academic ecologists, and the functionalism employed by many anthropologists. His theory would later be published, in its final form, as The Way: An Ecological World View. (see below)

Early on, Goldsmith had formulated a concept of the biosphere as an integrated cybernetic entity, the self-regulating parts (in which he included tribal societies) co-operating, largely unconsciously, for the mutual benefit of the whole, a view that anticipated aspects of the Gaia thesis, of which he was to become a leading proponent.

Goldsmith was also a critic of neo-Darwinism. He claimed that it is a reductionist theory and that if you understand evolution, it is necessary to "abandon the reductionistic and mechanistic paradigm of science".

=== The Ecologist ===
Having established The Ecologist in 1969 with founding editors Robert Allen, Jean Liedloff, and Peter Bunyard, Goldsmith was to use the journal as a platform for his theoretical concerns with regular articles appearing under the heading "Towards a Unified Science". The journal also became an important forum for the early green movement, with articles focusing on the relevance and survival of hunter-gatherer societies, alternative technology and organic farming, together with prescient articles about climate change, resource depletion, and nuclear accidents. They were accompanied by the usual gamut of articles examining pollution, overpopulation, deforestation, soil erosion, corporate power, large dams, and, not least, the World Bank's alleged role in "financing the destruction of our planet".

=== A Blueprint For Survival ===
Signed by over thirty of the leading scientists of the day, including Sir Julian Huxley, Sir Frank Fraser Darling, Sir Peter Medawar, Sir Peter Scott, and C. H. Waddington, Goldsmith and his fellow editor Robert Allen made headlines in January 1972 with A Blueprint for Survival.

The Blueprint was a far reaching proposal for a radical transition to a largely decentralised and deindustrialised society, an attempt to prevent what the authors referred to as " the breakdown of society and the irreversible disruption of the life-support systems on this planet". It became a key text for the early Green movement, selling over half a million copies, and it was translated into 16 languages. In many ways, it anticipated the concerns taken up by today's Transition Movement.

Goldsmith and Allen argued that rather than devise imaginary utopias, as did Marxist and liberal political theorists of the time, they should instead look to the example of existing tribal peoples, who, the authors claimed, were real-life working models of societies perfectly adapted to both their long-term survival needs and the needs of the living world on which they depended. The tribal peoples alone, the authors argued, had demonstrated a viable means by which the most pressing problems facing humanity could be answered successfully.

Such societies were characterised by their small, human-scale communities, low-impact technologies, successful population controls, sustainable resource management, holistic and ecologically integrated worldviews and a high degree of social cohesion, physical health, psychological well-being and spiritual fulfilment of their members.

=== The People Party ===
The Blueprint was a major inspiration for the embryonic political party called "People" (later to become the Green Party,) which invited Goldsmith to stand for the Eye constituency in Suffolk as their candidate in the February 1974 general election.

The campaign focused on the threat of desertification from the intensive farming practised in the area, which Goldsmith emphasised with the help of a Bactrian camel supplied by Aspinall. Goldsmith was in turn accompanied by bearded supporters dressed in the garb of Arab sheiks, the implication being that if modern oil-intensive farming practises were allowed to continue, the camel would be the only viable means of transport left in Suffolk. Goldsmith lost his deposit, but his unorthodox campaign succeeded in attracting the media's attention and highlighted the issues. He again stood for the now-renamed Ecology Party at the European elections in 1979, now winning a more respectable portion of the vote.

=== Cornwall ===
In 1973, buoyed by the success of the Blueprint and a sudden rise in public awareness of ecological issues, partly brought about by the Stockholm Conference and the publication of the Club of Rome's The Limits to Growth in the same year. Goldsmith and his editorial team moved from their offices in London to relocate to rural Cornwall, in the far west of England. Goldsmith and his colleagues bought themselves farms, and for the following 17 years, they attempted to form a small-scale, relatively self-sufficient community of their own, and The Ecologist continued to be produced on-site, in between their other chores.

In 1977, when the Central Electricity Generating Board (CEGB) threatened to site a nuclear reactor on farmland in Luxulyan, Cornwall, Goldsmith was among those who organised a continuous sit-in of the land, with local people blocking the entrance and staffing round-the-clock garrisons to prevent CEGB contractors from starting their drilling work. An early example of an environmental protest camp, the High Court of England and Wales eventually awarded in favour of CEGB allowing the drilling to go ahead. The CEGB never went on to develop the site, however.

=== The Gandhi Peace Foundation ===
In 1974, Goldsmith spent four months with the Gandhi Peace Foundation in New Delhi, comparing the Gandhian (Sarvodaya) movement with the Ecology movement in Europe. This led Goldsmith to forge close links with Indian environmental activists, in particular with the Chipko movement, including Sunderlal Bahuguna and Vandana Shiva. That was to have a major influence on Goldsmith's approach to environmental activism and led to a special issue of The Ecologist on the subject.

=== World Bank ===
In 1984, together with his colleague Nicholas Hildyard, Goldsmith authored a multi-volume report on the destructive effects of large-scale, hydroelectric dams. It was the beginning of a long attack against the International Monetary Fund and World Bank, which Goldsmith and his colleagues accused of financing the destruction of the planet.

In one episode, Goldsmith wrote an open letter to the then President of the World Bank, Alden W. Clausen, demanding that the bank "stop financing the destruction of the tropical world, the devastation of its remaining forests, the extermination of its wildlife and the impoverishment and starvation of its human inhabitants". At the time, the connection between large-scale development projects and social and environmental destruction had not been widely recognised, even within the environmental movement.

=== Forests campaign ===
In 1989, Goldsmith helped to organise an international campaign calling for an immediate end to the destruction of the world's remaining forests with its detrimental effects on indigenous cultures, biodiversity and global climate. The campaign raised over 3 million signatures, which were taken in wheelbarrows to the UN's headquarters in New York City. Goldsmith and a party of activists subsequently occupied the main lobby, refusing to move until the Secretary-General, Javier Pérez de Cuéllar, agreed to see them. The group demanded for him to call an extraordinary general meeting of the Security Council to tackle the global crisis of deforestation. Although failing, the campaign managed to organise a meeting in the US Senate with a group of senators, headed by Al Gore, whom the activists called upon to end their support of the World Bank.

=== The Goldsmith Foundation ===
In 1991, with the financial support of his brother James, Goldsmith established the Goldsmith (JMG) Foundation supporting a diverse range of non-governmental organisations campaigning against environmentally destructive activities, along with organisations providing sustainable alternatives.

=== The Way ===
In 1990, urged on by Arne Næss, Goldsmith left the editorship of The Ecologist to Nicholas Hildyard, while taking time off to write his philosophical magnum opus The Way: an ecological worldview. The Way (1992) was the culmination and synthesis of more than four decades of theoretical development, embodying a "coherent worldview" by which Goldsmith would attempt to explain the self-inflicted problems facing the world and to propose a way out of them. Much of the work was already mature in Goldsmith's mind by the time that he published the first issues of The Ecologist in 1970.

=== Later life ===
In addition to the UK Ecologist, Goldsmith later helped to found and support The Ecologist as independent enterprises in many parts of the world:

Brazil (in Portuguese); France (in French); Asia (India); Italy (in Italian); Greece (in Greek); The Pacific (New Zealand); Lebanon (in Arabic); Latin America (in Spanish); and Colombia (in Spanish).

He continued to attend key meetings around the world and involved himself with a variety of campaign organisations by becoming President of the Climate Initiatives Fund, Richmond, London; a board member of the International Forum on Globalization, San Francisco, USA; a founder member of Marunui Conservation Ltd., Mangawhai, New Zealand (1987); and a founder member and vice-president of ECOROPA, a European ecological club and think tank (1975).

== Philosophy ==
- Degrowth
- Holism
- Human scale
- Neotribalism
- Perennial Philosophy

== Controversies ==
In 1997, after a political split with the editorial team of The Ecologist, Goldsmith was left to run the magazine on his own. Having been absent for some years, he brought in the International Society for Ecology and Culture (ISEC) to act as the editorial team. His nephew Zac, who was then working for ISEC, eventually took over the editorship on their behalf.

The split led to a period of often-bitter criticism from some members of the political left in the environmental movement, which, compounded with failing health, resulted in a period of isolation from the British scene.

Goldsmith was accused of having affiliated himself with the Nouvelle Droite, an intellectual voice of the European "New Right", after addressing a symposium on Green issues organised in Paris by the GRECE (Research and Study Group on European Culture), a school of political thought founded largely on the works of Alain de Benoist. It was the attending of that and another similar event that had led to rising tensions with the editorial team at The Ecologist. The title of Goldsmith's contribution in Paris being simply "Une société écologique: la seule alternative" (An Ecological Society: The Only Alternative).

Later, in a controversial article for the Guardian newspaper, entitled "Black Shirts in Green Trousers", George Monbiot (a cofounder of the left-wing political party Respect) accused Goldsmith of having "advocated the enforced separation of Tutsis and Hutus in Rwanda and Protestants and Catholics in Ulster, on the grounds that they constitute 'distinct ethnic groups' and are thus culturally incapable of co-habitation" (a point rejected by Goldsmith). That, along with other attacks, eventually led Goldsmith to counter his critics with his indepth rebuttal My Answer.

Goldsmith's close association with his brother, Sir James Goldsmith, his lifelong friendship with the controversial casino owner and conservationist John Aspinall, along with his anti-modernist stance and support for indigenous peoples, ensured that Goldsmith had many detractors throughout his life. Still, Goldsmith received affectionate support and respect from across the full spectrum of the environmental movement and from many of the people whose views and preoccupations were the focus of his theoretical and philosophical critique.

Goldsmith's message continued to be sponsored around the world, in particular through his work with the International Forum on Globalization (IFG).

== Awards ==
- EMCI, Natura Uomo Ambiente, 8th Symposio Ecologico International, Napoli 1979
- Right Livelihood Award "for his uncompromising critique of industrialism and promotion of environmentally sustainable and socially just alternatives to it," 1991
- Chevalier de la Legion d'Honneur, 1991 (French knighthood)
- Premios Internacionales Vida Sana (Spanish organic association), 1991
- Best Book of the Year Award for Ecological and Transformational Politics, awarded by the American Political Science Association, for The Case Against the Global Economy: and for a turn towards the local, co-edited with Jerry Mander, 1997
- Council for International Affairs and Human Rights (Shiva statue)
- Gandhi Millennium Award, 2001
- International Forum on Globalization, Lifetime Achievement Award, 24 February 2007

== Influences ==
- Tribal peoples
- Ludwig von Bertalanffy
- Alfred North Whitehead
- Karl Polanyi
- Michael Polanyi
- Gandhi
- Eugene Odum
- C. H. Waddington
- Paul Alfred Weiss
- William Homan Thorpe
- Placide Tempels
- Alfred Radcliffe-Brown
- Roy Rappaport
- Richard St. Barbe Baker

== Associates ==
- John Aspinall (zoo owner)
- Jerry Mander
- Helena Norberg-Hodge
- Vandana Shiva
- Mae-Wan Ho
- John Papworth
- David Fleming
- Eugene Odum
- Gerardo Reichel-Dolmatoff
- Richard Willson Archived 6 October 2015 at the Wayback Machine
- Lawrence Hills
- Richard St. Barbe Baker
- James Lovelock
- The Prince of Wales
- Martin von Hildebrand

== Personal life ==
With his first wife, Gillian [Jill] Marion Pretty (later wife of "Comte" Jean-Baptiste de Monpezat, brother of Prince Consort Henrik of Denmark), he had two daughters and a son:

- Clio Goldsmith, married firstly Carlo Alessandro Puri Negri, secondly Mark Shand;
- Dido Goldsmith, married Peter Whitehead.
- Alexander Goldsmith

With his second wife, Katherine Victoria James, he had two sons:

- Benedict Goldsmith
- Zeno Goldsmith

He had a brother, James Goldsmith, through whom he is the uncle of Zac Goldsmith, Jemima Khan and Ben Goldsmith.

== Bibliography ==
=== Author ===
- The Stable Society (Wadebridge Press, 1978).
- The Great U-Turn: De-industrialising Society. Green Books, 1988
- The Way: an ecological world view (Rider, 1992; Revised Edition, Green Books, 1996).
- Les sept sentiers de l'écologie (The seven paths of ecology) (Editions Alphée, 2006).

=== Co-author ===
- A Blueprint for Survival (Penguin, 1972)
- The Doomsday Funbook (Joys of Apocalypse) 1977
- The Social and Environmental Effects of Large Dams (Wadebridge Ecological Centre):

Volume I (1984)
Volume II (1986)
Volume III (1992)

- 5,000 Days to Save the Planet (Hamlyn, 1990)
- The Doomsday Fun Book New Edition (John Carpenter, 2006)

=== Editor ===
- Can Britain Survive? (Part author. Tom Stacey Ltd, 1971)
- La Médecine à la Question (Fernand Nathar, France 1981)
- The Earth Report (Mitchell Beazley, 1988)
- Gaia, the Thesis, the Mechanisms and the Implications (Wadebridge Ecological Centre, 1988)
- Gaia and Evolution (Co-editor with Peter Bunyard. 1990)
- The Case Against the Global Economy and for a Turn Toward the Local (Co-editor with Jerry Mander. Sierra Club Books, 1996, ISBN 0-87156-865-9)
- Le Piège se Referme (The trap snaps shut again) (France 2001)

=== Essays (selection) ===
- "My answer"
- 2Towards a biospheric ethic"
- "The fall of the Roman Empire"
- "The family basis of social structure"
- "How to feed people under a regime of climate change"
- "Can the environment survive the global economy?"
- "Development and colonialism"
- "The myth of flood control"
- "Religion at the Millennium"
- "Art and ethics"
- "Development as Colonialism"
