= Cavenham =

Village and civil parish in Suffolk, England

Coordinates: 52.2968°N 00.5839°E

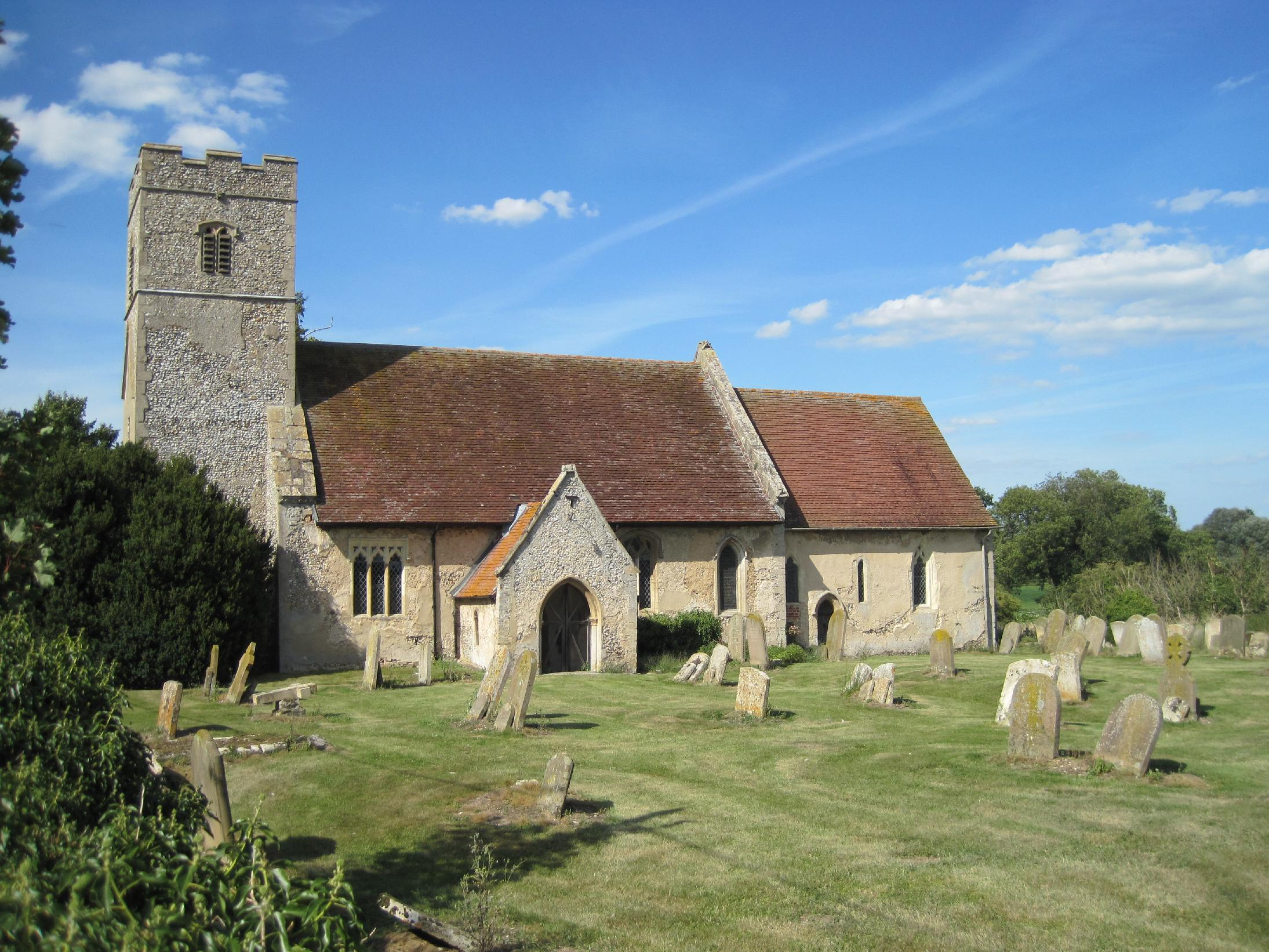
- St Andrew's Church, Cavenham

- Location within Suffolk
- Population: 136 (2011 census)
- OS grid reference: TL7669
- District: West Suffolk
- Shire county: Suffolk
- Region: East
- Country: England
- Sovereign state: United Kingdom
- Post town: Bury St Edmonds
- Postcode district: IP28
- Police: Suffolk
- Fire: Suffolk
- Ambulance: East of England
- UK Parliament: West Suffolk

Cavenham is a village and civil parish in Suffolk, England, 10 kilometres (6 mi) northwest of Bury St Edmunds. It is in the local government district of West Suffolk, and the electoral ward of Manor. At the 2021 UK census, Cavenham Parish had a population of 141. In the 1870s it had a population of 229.

The parish includes Cavenham Heath, a Site of Special Scientific Interest (SSSI) with a sand and gravel quarry close to it and is the location of the Black Ditches, an Anglo-Saxon boundary ditch which is believed to be the most easterly of a series of early Anglo-Saxon defensive earthworks built across the Icknield Way. Part of this also forms an SSSI to the south-east of the village.

== Toponymy ==
Toponymists Keith Briggs and Kelly Kilpatrick say Cavenham means a man called Cafa once owned a homestead here. They provide a number of different spellings following Domesday Book before it became stabilised as Cavenham. They also say Cafan has the genitive suffix meaning 'of Cafa'. The surname of canham originates from the name cavenham, all persons with the surname canham have their origins here at Cavenham

== Notable residents ==
- Thomas Le Blanc (1774-1843), lawyer and academic, Vice-Chancellor of the University of Cambridge from 1824 to 1825.
- Adolphe Goldschmidt (1838-1918), German businessman and art collector, created an estate of 2,500 acres at Cavenham in the late 19th century.
