= Compassion in World Farming =

Animal welfare organization

- Abbreviation: CIWF
- Formation: 1967; 59 years ago
- Founder: Peter Roberts
- Type: Charity
- Registration no.: 1095050
- Purpose: Promoting animal welfare
- Location: Godalming, England
- Region served: Worldwide
- Methods: Advocacy, public education, research
- Chief Executive: Philip Lymbery
- Staff: 102
- Volunteers: 4
- Website: www.ciwf.org.uk

Compassion in World Farming (CIWF) is an animal welfare organisation founded in 1967. It campaigns against the live export of animals, certain methods of livestock slaughter, and all systems of factory farming.

== History ==
Peter Roberts and Anna Roberts were Hampshire dairy farmers, who founded Compassion in World Farming (CIWF) in 1967. After being turned down by other groups, they started their own organization. Peter Roberts retired in 1991. He was replaced as Chief Executive by Joyce D'Silva, who served until 2005 and now serves as ambassador. Philip Lymbery, co-author of Farmageddon, is the current Chief Executive.

CIWF has offices in the UK, Italy, Netherlands, France, Poland, the United States, Brussels and China. Representatives are located in Czech Republic, Spain, Germany, South Africa, and Sweden. CIWF was responsible for the veal crate ban in the UK, as well as bans on narrow stalls and chains on pregnant sows. The European Union recognised animals as sentient beings as a result of their petition. In June 2023, Emma Silverthorn, the granddaughter of Anna and Peter Roberts, published a biography of the Roberts and a history of the charity titled Roaming Wild: The Founding of Compassion in World Farming.

== Activism ==
Compassion in World Farming does not support violence or threats. It is not opposed to killing animals and consuming their meat, but advocates for humane treatment throughout their lives. Besides advocacy, it produces educational material for school children, and has fought against what it calls industry-sponsored propaganda. It presents awards including the Good Egg, Good Chicken, Good Dairy, and Good Pig. Its undercover investigations have revealed animal cruelty to hens, cattle, pigs, and sheep.

CIWF advocates free range systems, but accepts straw-bedded indoor systems for pigs. It has warned about factory farming of dairy cattle, which it says is neither economically beneficial for farmers nor healthy for cows. It has advocated a complete ban on fur farming in Ireland, which it describes as "one of the most serious animal welfare problems facing Ireland today". In 2002, it called for a global moratorium on all experimental or commercial cloning of farm animals. It opposes the practice of live export of farm animals for slaughter, instead advocating that the animals be slaughtered before transport. In support of this position, its supporters have demonstrated in London, Ipswich, Belfast, Ramsgate, and Dover. It has also campaigned to maintain a ban on the live transport of horses. It supports a ban on foie gras, calling this "an example of intensive farming at its worst".

Celebrity supporters have included Joanna Lumley, who spoke against long distance animal transport, and Paul McCartney, who advocated for reduced consumption of meat products. In 2010, Jo Brand, Bill Oddie, Zac Goldsmith, Marc Abraham, and William Roache endorsed CIWF's protest against factory farming of cattle by Nocton Dairies. Early supporters include Spike Milligan and Celia Hammond, who protested against battery cages.

In 2007, CIWF won the BBC Radio 4 Food and Farming Award for the best food campaigner/educator. In 2009, it won the Broadcast Digital Award for Best Use of Interactive for their Chicken Out! website. In 2011, it won a Third Sector Excellence Award for its annual review and The Observer's Ethical Award for Campaigner of the Year.

== See also ==
- List of animal welfare organizations
- Intrinsic value in animal ethics
