= Peter Roberts (activist) =

Animal welfare activist and the founder of Compassion in World Farming

Peter H. Roberts
- Born: 7 June 1924; Rugeley, Staffordshire, England
- Died: 15 November 2006 (aged 82)
- Occupation: Activist
- Known for: Founding Compassion in World Farming

Peter Holton Roberts, MBE (7 June 1924 – 15 November 2006) was an animal welfare activist and the founder of Compassion in World Farming, which he led from 1967 – 1991.

== Biography ==
Peter Roberts was the son of a Staffordshire doctor and was raised in Rugeley. After serving in World War II, he attended an agricultural college and established a dairy farm in Hampshire. As demand in Britain rose for meat, Roberts saw increasing use of factory farming, which had been imported from the United States. Encouraged by popular support for his letter-writing campaign, Roberts unsuccessfully attempted to convince existing animal welfare organizations to protest intensive farming. As a result, he founded Compassion in World Farming in 1967. He gave up dairy farming the same year, and he established a health food shop in Petersfield in 1978. He led the organization until 1991, when he retired and was replaced by Joyce D'Silva. Although Roberts was a vegetarian, he did not push for others to change their eating habits. He was an advocate of reasoned debate and sought change through peaceful means.

He was awarded an MBE in 2002 for his work associated with Compassion in World Farming.

Robert's life story was memorialised in 2023 in the biography Roaming Wild, the Founding of Compassion in World Farming, which was written by his granddaughter, Emma Silverthorn.
