= Nocton Dairies controversy =

Dairy construction controversy in the UK

Coordinates: 53.1536°N 0.4331°W

Location plan based on planning application 09/1040/FUL drawing RAC/4448/01/A. The site size is to scale.

Nocton Dairies is a British company which was formed by Devon farmer and cheese-maker Peter Willes and Lancashire milk producer David Barnes in order to construct an 8,100-cow dairy at Nocton Heath in Lincolnshire, objectors to which claimed that it would have been the largest in Western Europe.

== Planning applications ==
A planning application to North Kesteven District Council was made on 17 December 2009, but after concerns raised by the Environment Agency, was withdrawn on 15 April 2010 having already aroused considerable reaction in the media.

After a premature report that the company had resubmitted its plans in August 2010, a revised application was submitted on 17 November 2010 for a 3,770-cow dairy, the reduced size being intended to address some concerns.

With the new application lodged, public concern was raised again and opposition became increasingly vociferous. On 16 February 2011, the company withdrew its second planning application and announced that it was abandoning its plans. A statement released by Nocton Dairies cited the objections of the Environment Agency as the sole reason and raised concerns that facts had been twisted on animal welfare matters. It added: "The concept we have been proposing is a sound one. We challenge other farmers to pick up the baton and see where these concepts can take them." Just hours after Nocton Dairies' shock announcement, officers at North Kesteven District Council took the unusual step of making a public statement that they had been minded to recommend refusal of the application, on six grounds, namely:

1. The failure of the applicant to fully assess alternative development sites which presented fewer environmental risks.
2. The unacceptable and significant risk to groundwater quality, including the nearby public water supply.
3. Significant uncertainties regarding the impacts and control of odour from the operation of the dairy, and associated land spreading, and its effects on residential amenity.
4. Insufficient detail regarding the frequency, volume and duration of operational noise, including from animals, and its effects on residential amenity.
5. Probable negative and adverse impacts to Bardney Limewoods Site of Special Scientific Interest (SSSI) and a series of Local Wildlife Sites from increased ammonia and nitrogen deposition.
6. Insufficient justification for the construction of on-site agricultural workers houses.

Meanwhile, two separate but associated plans supporting the dairy were still active; a pipeline for the transportation of the digestate to be produced and a water storage reservoir intended for either water for dairy cows or for better management of water resources on the arable land, should the application for the dairy farm be refused. Nocton Dairies did not withdraw either of these plans. In February 2011, North Kesteven District Council refused planning permission for the pipeline and the following month, it refused permission for the reservoir, irrespective of its dual functionality.

== Reaction to the applications ==
Nocton Dairies' initial application aroused much opposition, including an Early Day Motion signed by 172 MPs in the House of Commons on 8 March 2010; it was labelled by media reports at the time as a 'battery' farm for cows, despite reports of a growing number of similar (albeit smaller) indoor-based systems for dairy cows already successfully operating in the UK and Nocton Dairies' explanations that their housing plans mirrored the open housing systems in which all British cows were already kept for the winter months.

After concerns were voiced over the potential for pollution of the water aquifer, smells, animal welfare, disease control, security, transport issues and property blight surrounding the site, some local people formed a campaign group named CAFFO (Campaign Against Factory Farming Operations). A Number 10 e-petition, calling for a public inquiry into the development, was signed by 1,234 people in three weeks before the web site was closed for the duration of the 2010 UK election period. However, a later Government response emphasised the rigors of the planning process and current UK legislation ensuring high welfare standards.

Animal welfare charities and campaigners, and vegan and vegetarian groups also joined to support the case against the dairy. A Facebook group set up by Viva! calling for a halt to construction attracted over 7,500 members. WSPA (now called WAP) launched a campaign in September 2010 in anticipation of the resubmission of Nocton Dairies' proposal, featuring celebrities including Twiggy, Andrew Sachs, Chrissie Hynde, Jenny Seagrove and a large number of soap stars, and attracted over 25,000 pledges from people around the world that 'factory milk from battery cows' would not be used in their cuppas. The results of an Ipsos MORI survey released at the launch showed that 61% of those questioned said they would never buy milk produced in large-scale indoor dairy sheds. Compassion in World Farming's 'Cows belong in fields' campaign was launched late 2010, and the CPRE also campaigned on the issue. As well as this, a campaign was set up through site 38 Degrees who submitted a petition of over 50,000 signatures to the district council in January 2011 on the basis that the farm was cruel and would put other farmers out of business. 38 Degrees also singled out neighbouring farmers who had been keen to use the 'digestate' (left from the cow manure after anaerobic digestion had taken place) on their arable land as a more sustainable and natural source of fertilisers and to replace essential organic matter. These farmers pulled out of their agreements due to fear of reprisals after being named in adverts which urged the public to target them directly.

However, a letter sent by the Farm Animal Welfare Council to government ministers stated that cow welfare need not be compromised in large dairy units, a message echoed by the RSPCA, which, despite not permitting year-round housing for dairy cows within its Freedom Foods standards, said it didn't believe 'big was necessarily bad' and in fact could offer welfare benefits if implemented correctly. Other debates range around the potential for a large dairy such as this to improve food security and opportunities to reduce the carbon footprint of milk production through better efficiency and the adoption of technology such as anaerobic digestion. More recently the Government has published its Foresight report on Food and Farming, and the dairy's developers have asserted that their plans would help address the report's conclusions that farming needs to produce more food using fewer resources while tackling climate change.

During the consultation period, the Council reported as many as 14,000 objections had been lodged with PETA claiming responsibility for at least 6,000 CIWF 5,000, and other animal and vegan groups claiming many more; this was substantiated by an extensive social media campaign orchestrated by these groups against the proposal. However, this was countered by growing dairy industry support for the Nocton proposal, illustrated in submissions from the National Farmers' Union of England and Wales (NFU), the Country Land and Business Association, and Dairy UK, representing processors and farmers. Dairy UK warned: "Reject Nocton and UK dairy will suffer."

== Supermarket views ==
Supermarket chains Sainsbury's, Tesco, Waitrose and Marks & Spencer, as well as online food retailer Ocado, all indicated they did not intend to buy milk from 'super-dairies', while Morrisons and American-owned Asda seemed to support them. According to The Independent, Morrisons said they would consider buying from the farm, while Asda said they refused to answer such a "hypothetical" question.

In letters to a Parliamentary group in March 2010, Tesco and Sainsbury's stressed their commitment to animal welfare and stated that they had no plans to buy milk from Nocton. In another letter, Waitrose's managing director Mark Price stated, "a dairy farm of the size proposed would not fit with the Waitrose way of doing business, and I have to say that I am anxious that it represents the first step along the way towards a highly-industrialised, US approach to farming". On 17 November 2010, Marks & Spencer declared, "M&S does not buy milk from 'super-dairy' farms and we are committed to our current pool of dedicated dairy farms." Jason Gissing, co-founder of Ocado, said in a letter published on the Ocado web site in December 2010, "Rest assured, Ocado will not be milking it with Nocton.".

However, Morrisons again stressed its willingness to consider buying the farm's milk at the NFU conference in February 2011, saying the supermarket was open-minded about purchasing milk from Nocton-style dairies. And despite the stand taken by these other supermarkets, their words were called into question when it was revealed in an industry newsletter that a number of them already willingly take supply from larger indoor-based UK dairy farms.

== Reaction to withdrawal of plans ==
The consortium of opponents of the dairy – Vegetarian International Voice for Animals, The Soil Association, CPRE, Compassion in World Farming, Friends of the Earth, WSPA and local campaign group CAFFO – expressed delight that the plans had been withdrawn when the news was announced on 16 February 2011. WSPA UK's director Suzi Morris said: "This is fantastic news and greatly welcomed. This is a victory for consumers, dairy farmers and of course the cows within it and we can't forget the Lincolnshire community which has had a narrow escape."

The industry reaction was somewhat different. The news coincided with the end of the NFU conference where NFU president Peter Kendall, Agriculture Minister Jim Paice and food critic Jay Rayner were among those defending the concept of large scale farming. The news was greeted with concern that the dairy industry would find it hard to meet future challenges if it could not evolve and develop. Mansel Raymond, chair of the NFU's dairy board, said: "It is disappointing that the application has been withdrawn. Any planned investment in the dairy industry is a positive step. Nocton was an imaginative and innovative proposal, and I firmly believe that there remains a place in Britain for this type of investment if we are to meet the growing demand for food". The Royal Association of British Dairy Farmers also expressed its disappointment at the withdrawal. The British Cattle Veterinary Association, which leads the industry in managing the health and welfare of dairy cows in the UK, also took the steps of dismissing claims that Nocton Dairies would have been a "cow prison", saying its developers demonstrated a commitment to good welfare.

== Conclusion ==
Whether or not this or indeed any so called 'super-dairy' is ever built, this controversy is likely to have a lasting impact on Britain's future dairy policy. Supporters claim large scale farming offers opportunities to meet food security and climate change challenges of the future. Research by opponents counter this hypothesis with an argument that the economics of the system are unsustainable in a report titled Weighing the economics of dairy farms; however, the figures used in this report have also been heavily criticised by the industry's leading providers of economics data DairyCo, part of the Agriculture and Horticulture Development Board, saying that the different systems are not being compared on a like for like basis and are 'astonishingly naïve'. However, there are concerns that any similar proposal, if successful, would set a precedent for the development of large-scale farming systems more commonly associated with the US where such units are known as CAFOs – although with the definition of a dairy CAFO being over 750 cows, DairyCo, the dairy industry's levy and advisory body, says there are already at least 12 such farms operating successfully and without issues – as proven by the lack of media interest in these farms – in England.

Comments made by at the 2011 NFU conference by food critic Jay Rayner during a panel discussion entitled 'Is modern agriculture palatable?' pointed to the industry being at fault. Mr Rayner told farmers that perception that the public would disapprove of such a development had been given fuel by a lack of positive PR. "The industry has to look at how it communicates to the media, not just to the industry and government. Basically it needs to work out a way to kill those page three Daily Mail stories which misrepresent what agriculture is. There is a failure of imagination. You need to employ some PR people to communicate the realities of agricultural production in the 21st century".

Either way, the fact that many farmers are prosecuted by the Environment Agency for pollution or waste offences as they struggle to adhere to constantly tightening regulation, demonstrates that environmental legislation is crucial to the protection of the land where any such development is placed. Following the withdrawal and refusal of Nocton Dairies' plans, one of the directors, Peter Willes, had to pay over £23,000 when he accepted responsibility for three environmental offences, two of which related to pollution of water courses.

All involved also learned that social media plays an important part in 21st century campaigning as while they had no direct impact on the withdrawal of the application, thousands of supporters were gained via the range of sites named earlier. However, it also became clear that as well as factual information, a number of myths and untruths were also being propagated over social media – one led to a petition with 15,000 signatures being withdrawn as it falsely claimed hormones and tail docking would form part of the plan, prompting concerns that support generated in this way might contain little substance. Campaigners also learned that developers will both take issue with their efforts and will threaten legal action where they feel inaccuracies have been portrayed; Nocton Dairies' referral of local group CAFFO to the Advertising Standards Authority (United Kingdom) was 'informally resolved' when CAFFO notified the ASA that the leaflet had already been distributed and there were no immediate plans to publish another, stopping the investigation in its tracks. At a later date, another large scale farm developer, Midland Pig Producers, threatened legal action against the Soil Association because of unsubstantiated and libellous allegations.
