= Enrico Vaime =

Italian writer and television presenter (1936–2021)

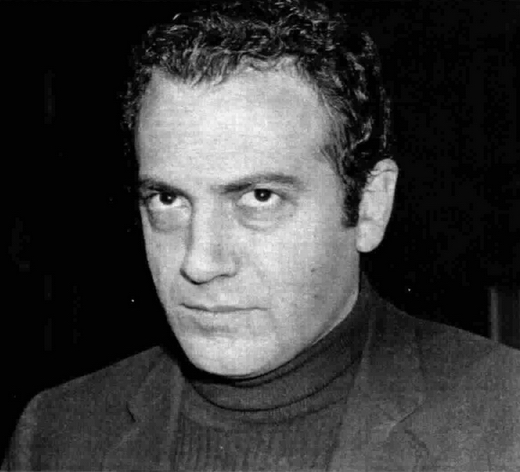
Enrico Vaime in Radiocorriere magazine, 1969.

Enrico Vaime (19 January 1936 – 28 March 2021) was an Italian author, playwright, screenwriter, television and radio writer and presenter.

Born in Perugia, after graduating in law in 1960 Vaime was employed by RAI, but he resigned almost immediately in order to have a wider artistic freedom. In 1963 he debuted as a playwright with the comedy I piedi al caldo, which was banned by Italian censorship shortly after its first representation at the Festival of Two Worlds in Spoleto. In 1971 he started a proficuous collaboration with the writer Italo Terzoli; their debut novel, Amore significa, was a bestseller and got over thirty editions. From 1977, the couple also wrote a series of musicals and comedy plays for Garinei & Giovannini. Vaime is also author of several essays, notably Il varietà è morto (1989). He is the author and presenter, since 1978, of the variety show Black Out, one of the longest running radio programs in Italy.
