= Italo Terzoli =

Italian screenwriter

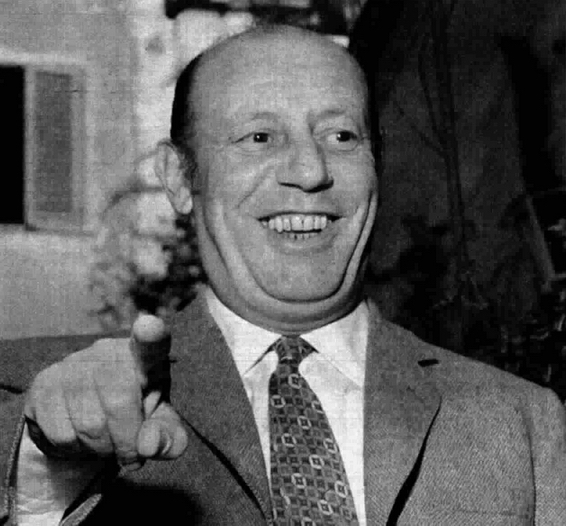
Italo Terzoli in Radiocorriere magazine, 1969.

Italo Terzoli (18 January 1924 – 13 May 2008) was an Italian author, playwright, screenwriter, television and radio writer.

Born in Milan, Terzoli started his career as a playwright in the early 1950s, collaborating first with Carlo Silva and later with Renzo Puntoni a number of musical comedies for popular comedians of the time such as Walter Chiari, Sorelle Nava, and the couple Sandra Mondaini and Raimondo Vianello. In the 1960s he wrote a number of stage comedies together with Marcello Marchesi. In 1971 he started a proficuous collaboration with the writer Enrico Vaime; their debut novel, Amore significa, was a bestseller and got over thirty editions. From 1977, the couple also wrote a series of musicals and comedy plays for Garinei & Giovannini.
