= 1957 Birthday Honours =

British government recognitions

The Queen's Birthday Honours 1957 were appointments in many of the Commonwealth realms of Queen Elizabeth II to various orders and honours to reward and highlight good works by citizens of those countries.

The appointments were made to celebrate the official birthday of The Queen, and were published on 4 June 1957 for the United Kingdom and Colonies, Australia, New Zealand, and to members of the British Armed Forces in recognition of distinguished and gallant services in the Operations in the Near East, October–December 1956.

The recipients of honours are displayed here as they were styled before their new honour, and arranged by honour, with classes (Knight, Knight Grand Cross, etc.) and then divisions (Military, Civil, etc.) as appropriate.

== United Kingdom and Colonies ==
=== Viscount ===
- The Right Honourable Harold Vincent, Baron Mackintosh of Halifax, DL, chairman, National Savings Committee.

=== Baron ===
- Sir Horace Evans, GCVO, MD, FRCP. Physician.
- Lieutenant-General Sir (Charles) Willoughby Moke Norrie, GCMG, GCVO, CB, DSO, MC, Governor-General and Commander-in-Chief, New Zealand.
- Joseph Arthur Rank. For public services.

=== Baronet ===
- Captain James Alexander Lawson Duncan, MP, Member of Parliament for North Kensington, 1931–1945, and for South Angus since 1950. For political and public services.
- Hamilton William Kerr, MP, Member of Parliament for Oldham, 1931–1945, and for Cambridge since 1950. Parliamentary Secretary, Ministry of Health, May–July 1945. For political and public services.
- Sir Fitzroy Hew Maclean, CBE, MP, Member of Parliament for Lancaster since 1941. Parliamentary Under-Secretary of State and Financial Secretary, War Office, 1954–1957. For political and public services.
- The Right Honourable Sir Henry Urmston Willink, MC, QC. For public services.

=== Knight Bachelor ===
- Major Edward Beddington-Behrens, CMG, MC. For services to the European Movement.
- Isaiah Berlin, CBE, Fellow of All Souls College, University of Oxford.
- Reginald Poulton Biddle, CBE, TD. For public services in Southampton.
- William Robson Brown, MP, Member of Parliament for Esher since 1950. For political and public services in Surrey.
- Gordon Roy Cameron, MB, FRCP, Professor of Morbid Anatomy, University College Hospital Medical School, University of London.
- John Middleton Campbell, chairman, Booker Brothers, McConnell & Co. Ltd.
- Harry Campion, CB, CBE, director, Central Statistical Office, Cabinet Office.
- William Emsley Carr, chairman, News of the World.
- Charles Travis Clay, CB, lately Librarian, House of Lords.
- His Honour Brett Mackay Cloutman, VC, MC, QC, Senior Official Referee, Supreme Court of Judicature.
- Colonel John Gordon Crabbe, OBE, MC, TD. For public services. Lord Lieutenant of Dumfries.
- Geoffrey Crowther. For services to Journalism.
- Leslie Doubleday, JP. For political and public services in Kent.
- Thomas Robinson Ferens, CBE. For political and public services in Hull.
- Charles John Geddes, CBE, Member of the General Council, Trades Union Congress.
- George Colvile Hayter-Hames, CBE, DL, chairman, Devon County Council. For services to Agriculture in Devon.
- Robert John Rolston Harcourt, JP, Lord Mayor of Belfast. For public services.
- Alister Clavering Hardy, Linacre Professor of Zoology and Comparative Anatomy, University of Oxford.
- Air Commodore Arthur Vere Harvey, CBE, MP, Member of Parliament for Macclesfield since 1945. For political and public services.
- Samuel Thompson Irwin, CBE, MCh, FRCS, MP. For political and public services in Belfast.
- William Clarence Johnson, CMG, CBE, HM Inspector of Constabulary, Home Office.
- George Basil Todd-Jones, Presiding Special Commissioner of Income Tax, Board of Inland Revenue.
- Herbert Gladstone McDavid, CBE, chairman and managing director, Glen Line Ltd.
- John Leslie Martin, Professor of Architecture, University of Cambridge.
- Major-General Aymer Maxwell, CBE, MC, chairman, British Legion, Scotland.
- Lieutenant-Colonel Dealtry Charles Part, OBE. For public services in Bedfordshire. Lately Lord Lieutenant.
- George White Pickering, MD, FRCP, Regius Professor of Medicine, University of Oxford.
- Frederick Pickworth, chairman, English Steel Corporation Ltd.
- Lieutenant-Colonel George Kenneth Fordham Ruddle, TD, DL. For political and public services in Rutland.
- Colonel Malcolm Stoddart-Scott, OBE, TD, MD, MP, Member of Parliament for Pudsey and Otley, 1945–1950, and for Ripon since 1950. For political and public services.
- William Scott, OBE, JP. For political and public services in Jarrow.
- William Sinclair, CBE, JP. For political services in Scotland.
- Edward Walter Thompson, JP, chairman, John Thompson Ltd., Wolverhampton.
- William Gosselin Trower. For political and public services.
- Donald Wolfit, CBE, Actor-Manager.
- Alec Thomas Sharland Zealley, chairman, Remploy Ltd.

State of South Australia

- John Stanley Murray, of Adelaide, State of South Australia. For public services.

State of Victoria

- Professor Arthur Barton Pilgrim Amies, CMG, DDSc, FRACS, Dean of the Faculty of Dental Science, University of Melbourne, State of Victoria.
- Colonel the Honourable William Watt Leggatt, DSO, MC, ED, Agent-General in London for the State of Victoria.
- Henry Arthur Winneke, OBE, Solicitor General, State of Victoria.

Overseas Territories

- Grantley Herbert Adams, CMG, QC. For public services in Barbados.
- Ernest Samuel Beoku-Betts, MBE. For public services in Sierra Leone.
- Paget James Bourke, Chief Justice of Cyprus.
- Richard Brunel Hawes, CMG, MB, FRCP, Consulting Physician to the Colonial Office.
- Frank Wilfred Holder, KCMG, QC, Chief Justice of British Guiana.
- Joseph Henry Pierre, MB, FRCS(Ed), Specialist Surgeon, General Hospital, Port of Spain, Trinidad.
- Bernard Vidal Shaw, Senior Puisne Judge, Special Court, Cyprus.
- John Whyatt, QC, Chief Justice, Singapore.

=== Order of the Bath ===
==== Knight Grand Cross of the Order of the Bath (GCB) ====
Military Division

- Admiral Sir Charles Edward Lambe, KCB, CVO.
- General Sir Francis Wogan Festing, KCB, KBE, DSO (611). Colonel, The Royal Northumberland Fusiliers.
- Air Chief Marshal Sir Ronald Ivelaw-Chapman, KCB, KBE, DFC, AFC.

Civil Division

- Sir Frank Aubrey Newsam, KCB, KBE, CVO, MC, Permanent Under-Secretary of State, Home Office.

==== Knight Commander of the Order of the Bath (KCB) ====
Military Division

- Vice-Admiral Geoffrey Barnard, CB, CBE, DSO.
- Vice-Admiral Gerald Vaughan Gladstone, CB.
- General Sir Dudley Ward, KBE, CB, DSO (41238), late Infantry.
- Lieutenant-General Sir Geoffrey Kemp Bourne, KBE, CB, CMG (23643). Colonel Commandant, Royal Regiment of Artillery.
- Lieutenant-General Cyril Frederick Charles Coleman, CB, CMG, DSO, OBE (27168), late Infantry.
- Air Vice-Marshal John Humphrey Edwardes-Jones, CB, CBE, DFC, AFC.
- Air Vice-Marshal Laurence Frank Sinclair, GC, CB, CBE, DSO.

Additional Knight Commander

In recognition of distinguished services in the Operations in the Near East, October–December 1956.

- Vice-Admiral Leonard Francis Durnford-Slater, CB.

Civil Division

- Noel Kilpatrick Hutton, CB, First Parliamentary Counsel.

==== Companion of the Order of the Bath (CB) ====
Military Division

Royal Navy

- Rear-Admiral Keith McNeil Campbell-Walter.
- Rear-Admiral George Kempthorne Collett, DSC.
- Rear-Admiral Sir John Ralph Coote, Bt, CBE, DSC.
- Surgeon Rear-Admiral David Duncan, OBE, MD, ChB.
- Rear-Admiral Lawrence George Durlacher, OBE, DSC.
- Rear-Admiral Harry Philpot Koelle.
- Rear-Admiral John Bertram Newsom.
- Surgeon Rear-Admiral Arnold Ashworth Pomfret, OBE, MB, ChB.
- Rear-Admiral Sir St. John Reginald Joseph Tyrwhitt, Bt, DSO, DSC.
- Rear-Admiral Wilfrid John Wentworth Woods, DSO.

Army

- Major-General Geoffrey Ernest Butler, CBE (47699), Corps of Royal Electrical & Mechanical Engineers.
- Major-General Thomas Bell Lindsay Churchill, CBE, MC (38512). Colonel, The Manchester Regiment.
- Major-General Rohan Delacombe, CBE, DSO (34748). Colonel, The Royal Scots (The Royal Regiment).
- Major-General Robert Withers Ewbank, CBE, DSO (38372), late Corps of Royal Engineers.
- Major-General Richard James Moberly, OBE (34480), late Royal Corps of Signals.
- Major-General Philip Francis Palmer, OBE, QHS, MB (35621), late Royal Army Medical Corps.
- Major-General Charles Leslie Richardson, CBE, DSO (40407), late Corps of Royal Engineers.
- Major-General John Michael Kane Spurling, CBE, DSO (31731), late Infantry.
- Major-General William Gurdon Stirling, CBE, DSO (36888), late Royal Regiment of Artillery.
- Major-General Ronald Walton Urquhart, DSO (34932), late Corps of Royal Engineers.

Additional Companions

In recognition of distinguished services in the Operations in the Near East, October–December 1956.

- Brigadier (Temporary Major-General) Geoffrey Lucas, CBE (32021), Staff, late Royal Armoured Corps.
- Brigadier (Temporary) Kenneth Thomas Darling, CBE, DSO (44052), Staff, late Infantry.

Royal Air Force

- Air Vice-Marshal Alexander Annan Adams, DFC.
- Air Vice-Marshal John Darcy Baker-Carr, CBE, AFC.
- Air Vice-Marshal Joseph Cox, OBE, DFC.
- Air Vice-Marshal Walter Philip George Pretty, CBE.
- Acting Air Vice-Marshal Herbert James Kirkpatrick, CBE, DFC.
- Air Commodore Alfred Thomas Monks.
- Air Commodore Ronald Charles Storrar, OBE.
- Group Captain Howard Wright Penney, CBE.

Additional Knight Commander

In recognition of distinguished services in the Operations in the Near East, October–December 1956.

- Acting Air Marshal Denis Hensley Fulton Barnett, CB, CBE, DFC.

Additional Companion

In recognition of distinguished services in the Operations in the Near East, October-December 1956

- Acting Air Commodore Thomas Öther Prickett, DSO, DFC, Royal Air Force.

Civil Division

- Anthony John Aglen, Deputy Secretary, Scottish Home Department.
- John Henry Benjamin Chapman, Principal Deputy Director of Naval Construction, Admiralty.
- Arnold William France, Under-Secretary, HM Treasury.
- Denis William Garstin Latimer Haviland, Under-Secretary, Ministry of Supply.
- David Willis Wilson Henderson, Director, Microbiological Research Establishment, Ministry of Supply.
- John Keith Horsefield, Director of Finance and Accounts, General Post Office.
- Reginald Howlett, Under-Secretary, Ministry of Education.
- Frank William Mottershead, Under-Secretary, Ministry of Defence.
- Francis Ralph Hay Murray, CMG, Officer Grade IV, Senior Branch, Foreign Service.
- Brigadier James Alexander Oliver, CBE, DSO, TD, ADC, DL, chairman, Territorial and Auxiliary Forces Association of the Counties of Angus and the City of Dundee.
- Denis O'Neill, Under-Secretary, Ministry of Transport & Civil Aviation.
- Henry Thompson Smith, Assistant Under-Secretary of State, Air Ministry.
- Keith Lievesley Stock, Under-Secretary, Ministry of Power.
- Richard George Kitchener Way, CBE, Lately Deputy Under-Secretary of State, War Office (now Deputy Secretary, Ministry of Defence.)
- Anthony Edward Welch, CMG, Under-Secretary, Board of Trade.

Additional Companion

- Brigadier Ivan de la Bere, CVO, CBE, Secretary, Central Chancery of the Orders of Knighthood, and Deputy Secretary, The Most Honourable Order of the Bath.

=== Order of Saint Michael and Saint George ===
==== Knight Grand Cross of the Order of St Michael and St George (GCMG) ====
- Sir Hugh Mackintosh Foot, KCMG, KCVO, OBE, Captain General and Governor-in-Chief, Jamaica.
- Sir Donald Charles MacGillivray, KCMG, MBE, High Commissioner, Federation of Malaya.
- Sir James Wilson Robertson, GCVO, KCMG, KBE, Governor-General and Commander-in-Chief, Federation of Nigeria.

==== Knight Commander of the Order of St Michael and St George (KCMG) ====
- The Right Honourable Austin Richard William Low, CBE, DSO, TD, MP, Member of Parliament for Blackpool North since 1945. Parliamentary Secretary, Ministry of Supply, 1951–1954; Minister of State, Board of Trade, 1954–1957. For political and public services.
- Henry John Bevis Lintott, CMG, Deputy Under-Secretary of State, Commonwealth Relations Office.
- Ian Morrison Ross Maclennan, CMG, High Commissioner for the United Kingdom in Ghana.
- John Gutch, CMG, OBE, High Commissioner for the Western Pacific.
- Sir William Henry Tucker Luce, KBE, CMG, Governor and Commander-in-Chief, Aden.
- Colin Hardwick Thornley, CMG, CVO, Governor and Commander-in-Chief, British Honduras.
- John Eltringham Coulson, CMG, Minister at Her Majesty's Embassy in Washington.
- Patrick Henry Dean, CMG, Deputy Under-Secretary of State, Foreign Office.
- Leslie Alfred Charles Fry, CMG, OBE, Her Majesty's Envoy Extraordinary and Minister Plenipotentiary in Budapest.
- William Horace Montagu-Pollock, CMG, Her Majesty's Ambassador Extraordinary and Plenipotentiary in Lima.

==== Companion of the Order of St Michael and St George (CMG) ====
- Brigadier Sydney Collingwood, CBE, MC, Regional Director (at Rome), Southern Region, Imperial War Graves Commission.
- Captain William Richmond Fell, CBE, DSC, Royal Navy (Retired), Senior Civilian Officer, United Kingdom Salvage Unit, Port Said.
- Frederick Roland George Heaf, MD, FRCP, David Davies Professor of Tuberculosis, University of Wales, and Consultant in Tuberculosis to the Colonial Office.
- Ernest James Henry Holt, CBE, lately Adviser for the Olympic Games held in Melbourne, Commonwealth of Australia.
- Charles Kemp, CBE, Senior Trade Commissioner for the United Kingdom in the Union of South Africa.
- Roland Stuart Andrews, chairman and managing director, Gas & Fuel Corporation, State of Victoria.
- The Honourable Francis Edward Hovell-Thurlow-Cumming-Bruce, Deputy High Commissioner for the United Kingdom in Ghana.
- The Most Reverend Eris Michael O'Brien, Archbishop of Canberra & Goulburn. For public services in the State of New South Wales.
- Alan Lowe Reynolds, OBE, formerly Secretary for Justice, Internal Affairs & Housing, Southern Rhodesia.
- Kenneth Francis Villiers Sanderson, Judge of the Local Court in Adelaide, State of South Australia.
- John Brayne-Baker, lately Deputy Commissioner of the Cameroons, Federation of Nigeria.
- John Coleraine Hanbury Barcroft, Financial Secretary, Sarawak.
- John Winder Cusack, OBE, Defence Secretary and Minister for Internal Security & Defence, Kenya.
- Leslie Harold Newsom Davis, Permanent Secretary, Ministry of Communications & Works, Singapore.
- Ralph Leonard Emmanuel Dreschfield, QC, Attorney-General, Uganda.
- Sidney Harold Evans, OBE, lately Chief Information Officer, Colonial Office, now Adviser on Public Relations to the Prime Minister.
- Alan James Gracie, Federal Establishment Officer, Federation of Malaya.
- Derek Headly, lately British Adviser, Kelantan, Federation of Malaya.
- Richard Owen Hennings, Permanent Secretary, Ministry of Agriculture, Kenya.
- Solomon Hochoy, OBE, Colonial Secretary, Trinidad.
- Charles Roberts Howitt, Deputy Chairman, Public Service Commission, Federation of Malaya.
- Glyn Smallwood Jones, MBE, Provincial Commissioner, Northern Rhodesia.
- David McLellan, ED, Permanent Secretary, Ministry of Education and Director of Education, Singapore.
- David James Masterton Mackenzie, OBE, MB, ChB, Director of Medical Services, Northern Region, Nigeria.
- Charles Demoree Newbold, QC, Legal Secretary, East Africa High Commission.
- Alfred Foley Francis Polden Newns, Secretary to the Governor-General and Commander-in-Chief, and the Council of Ministers, Federation of Nigeria.
- Percy Herbert Nightingale, Financial Secretary, Zanzibar.
- George Kingsley Roth, OBE, Secretary for Fijian Affairs, Fiji.
- Ivor Frederick Wentworth Schofield, Administrative Officer, Staff Grade, Western Region, Nigeria.
- Oscar Alan Spencer, Economic Adviser, Federation of Malaya.
- Cyril Maxwell Palmer Brown, Counsellor (Commercial) at Her Majesty's Embassy in Washington.
- John Lewis Croome, lately Counsellor, United Kingdom Delegation to the Organisation for European Economic Co-operation, Paris.
- Alan John Edden, Foreign Office.
- Colonel Hugh Vincent Fraser, OBE, TD, lately Military Attaché at Her Majesty's Embassy in Cairo.
- Guy George Hannaford, OBE, Counsellor at Her Majesty's Embassy in Rome.
- James Dalton Murray, Foreign Office.
- Edward Heywood Peck, Deputy to the General Officer Commanding and Head of Political Division, Berlin (British Sector).
- Christopher Louis George Phillpotts, lately First Secretary at Her Majesty's Embassy in Athens.
- John Hughes Wardle-Smith, Counsellor (Commercial) at Her Majesty's Embassy in Djakarta.
- Brigadier Charles Deane Steel, OBE, Foreign Office.

Honorary Companions

- Tuan Sheikh Ahmad bin Sheikh Mustapha, CBE, JP. For public services in the Federation of Malaya.
- Othman bin Mohamed, Commissioner for Malaya in the United Kingdom.

=== Royal Victorian Order ===
==== Knight Commander of the Royal Victorian Order (KCVO) ====
- Major Edward William Spencer Ford, CB, MVO.
- Major-General George Frederick Johnson, CB, CBE, DSO.
- Ralph Marnham, MChir, FRCS.
- Sir John Mitchell Harvey Wilson, Bt, CVO.

==== Commander of the Royal Victorian Order (CVO) ====
- Major-General Sir Allan Henry Shafto Adair, Bt, CB, DSO, MC.
- Frederick Arthur Bishop.

==== Member of the Royal Victorian Order, 4th class (MVO) ====
- Captain John Harold Adams, Royal Navy.
- Commander Francis Bruen, Royal Navy.
- Surgeon Commander Peter Geoffrey Burgess, BM, BCh, Royal Navy.
- Captain Harold Lewis Cryer, Royal Navy.
- Commander John Assheton Eardley-Wilmot, DSC, Royal Navy.
- William Neil Maclay, MBE, MRCS, LRCP.
- Peter Parker.
- The Honourable Iris Irene Adele Peake.
- Phyllis Murray.

==== Member of the Royal Victorian Order, 5th class (MVO) ====
- Douglas Butt.
- Squadron Leader John Edwin Loxton, OBE, Royal Air Force.

=== Order of the British Empire ===
==== Knight Grand Cross of the Order of the British Empire (GBE) ====
Military Division

- General Sir Nevil Charles Dowell Brownjohn, KCB, CMG, OBE, MC, ADC (Gen.) (11450). Colonel Commandant, Corps of Royal Engineers.

Additional Knight Grand Cross

In recognition of distinguished services in the Operations in the Near East, October–December 1956.

- General Sir Charles Frederic Keightley, GCB, KBE, DSO (14936), late Royal Armoured Corps.

Civil Division

- Sir Francis Edwards Evans, KCMG, Her Majesty's Ambassador Extraordinary & Plenipotentiary in Buenos Aires.

==== Dame Grand Cross of the Order of the British Empire (GBE) ====
Civil Division

- The Right Honourable Dame Dehra Kerr Parker, DBE, MP, Member of Northern Ireland Parliament, 1921-1929 and since 1933. Parliamentary Secretary, Ministry of Education, 1937–1944; Minister of Health and Local Government, 1949–1957. For political and public services in Northern Ireland.

==== Knight Commander of the Order of the British Empire (KBE) ====
Military Division

Royal Navy

- Vice-Admiral Arthur Gordon Voules Hubback, CB, CBE.
- Vice-Admiral Stephen Hope Carlill, CB, DSO (on loan to the Government of India).
- Major-General Cecil Farndale Phillips, CB, CBE, DSO, Royal Marines.

Additional Knight Commander

In recognition of distinguished services in the Operations in the Near East, October–December 1956.

- Vice-Admiral Maxwell Richmond, CB, DSO, OBE.

Army

- Lieutenant-General Charles Douglas Packard, CB, CBE, DSO (26992). Colonel Commandant, Royal Regiment of Artillery.
- Lieutenant-General (temporary) Edric Montague Bastyan, CB, CBE (27151), late Infantry.

Royal Air Force

- Air Marshal Raymund George Hart, CB, CBE, MC.
- Air Vice-Marshal George David Harvey, CB, CBE, DFC.

Civil Division

- Captain Sir Ian Frederick Cheney Bolton, Bt, OBE. For services to the Boy Scout Movement in Scotland. Lord Lieutenant of Stirlingshire.
- James Bowman, CBE, chairman, National Coal Board.
- Brigadier Lionel Herbert Harris, CBE, TD, Engineer-in-Chief, General Post Office.
- The Right Honourable Geoffrey William Richard Hugh, Earl of Munster. A Lord-in-waiting, 1932–1938; Paymaster General, 1938–1939; Parliamentary Under-Secretary of State for War, 1939, India and Burma, 1943–1944, Home Affairs, 1944–1945, Colonies, 1951–1954; Minister without Portfolio, 1954–1957.
- Leslie Harold Robinson, CB, Second Secretary, Board of Trade.
- George Vernon Kitson, CBE, Her Majesty's Consul-General at Milan.
- Sir Frank (Francis) Palmer Selleck, MC, Lord Mayor of the City of Melbourne, State of Victoria, since 1954.
- Colonel Lee Hau Shik, CBE, JP, Minister of Finance, Federation of Malaya.
- Sir Stafford William Powell Foster-Sutton, CMG, OBE, QC, Chief Justice of the Federation of Nigeria.

==== Dame Commander of the Order of the British Empire (DBE) ====
Civil Division

- Anne Margaret Bryans, CBE, Deputy Chairman, British Red Cross Society.

==== Commander of the Order of the British Empire (CBE) ====
Military Division

Royal Navy

- Captain James Edward Best, (Retd).
- Captain Howard Francis Bone, DSO, DSC.
- Instructor Captain Stanley Walter Croucher Pack.
- Acting Captain John Gordon Stanning, OBE.

Additional Commanders

In recognition of distinguished services in the Operations in the Near East, October–December 1956.

- Commodore Desmond Parry Dreyer, DSC.
- Captain Charles Piercy Mills, DSC.
- Captain Theodore Edward Podger, UK Salvage Unit.

Army

- Brigadier (temporary) Ian Herbert Fitzgerald Boyd, OBE (38385), late Corps of Royal Engineers.
- Colonel Joseph Theodore Burgess (26786), late Royal Army Educational Corps.
- Colonel (temporary) John Frederick Carroll, OBE (34600), The Royal Norfolk Regiment (Employed List), (now RARO).
- Brigadier Lawrence Norman Cholmeley, MBE (33327), late Royal Regiment of Artillery.
- Brigadier Ernest Dynes, OBE, ADC (28066), late Royal Army Service Corps.
- Brigadier Lindley Robert Edmundson Fayle, DSO, OBE (26965), late Corps of Royal Engineers (now RARO).
- Colonel (temporary) John Michael Green, MBE (230115), Corps of Royal Engineers.
- Colonel (temporary) Michael George Howard Henley (44878), The King's Regiment (Liverpool).
- Colonel George Laing, MBE (41033), late Infantry.
- Brigadier Richard Eyre Lloyd, DSO, OBE (37083), late Corps of Royal Engineers.
- Brigadier John Francis Macnab, DSO, OBE (34875), late Infantry.
- Colonel (acting) Hugh Rose, DSO, TD (66450), The Royal Scots (The Royal Regiment), Territorial Army.
- Brigadier (temporary) Michael Alan Wethered Rowlandson, OBE (41182), late Royal Regiment of Artillery (now RARO).
- Brigadier (local) Noel Frederick Bridgman Shaw, DSO, OBE (384031), 6th Gurkha Rifles (Employed List).
- Brigadier Leslie Cuthbert Turnbull (17622), Royal Army Ordnance Corps.
- Colonel (temporary) Lionel Johnson Wood, OBE (37208), The Dorset Regiment.

Additional Commanders

In recognition of distinguished services in the Operations in the Near East, October–December 1956.

- Brigadier (Temporary) Ewing Henry Wrigley Grimshaw, DSO, OBE (50117), Staff, late Infantry.
- Colonel Joseph Harold Spence Lacey, OBE (36703), Staff, late Corps of Royal Engineers.
- Brigadier William Guise Tucker, OBE (37097), Staff, late Royal Corps of Signals.

Royal Air Force

- Air Commodore James Hill, MB, ChB.
- Group Captain Frederic Osborne Storey Dobell.
- Group Captain George Desmond Garvin.
- Group Captain Walter MacIan King.
- Group Captain Geoffrey Lowe, DFC, AFC.
- Group Captain Harry Leslie Rudd.
- Group Captain Henry Niel George Wheeler, DSO, OBE, DFC, AFC.
- Group Captain Cathcart Michael Wight-Boycott, DSO.
- Acting Group Captain Leslie Thomas Card.
- The Reverend Gordon Hyslop.

Additional Commanders

In recognition of distinguished services in the Operations in the Near East, October–December 1956.

- Group Captain Albert Avion Case, OBE.
- Group Captain William Vernon Crawford-Compton, DSO, DFC.
- Group Captain John Charles Macdonald, DFC, AFC.
- Group Captain Brian Radley Macnamara, DSO.

Civil Division

- Elsie Myrtle Abbot, Under-Secretary, HM Treasury.
- Harry Surtees Altham, DSO, MC, chairman, Marylebone Cricket Club Youth Cricket Association.
- Thomas Ernest Bean, General Manager, The Royal Festival Hall.
- Charles Kellam Bird, MM, General Manager, Eastern Region, British Railways.
- Arthur Thomas Black, Director of Electronic Production (Munitions), Ministry of Supply.
- Richard Frank Bonallack, OBE. For political services in Essex.
- Arthur Wilfred Bonsall, MBE, Grade A1 Officer, Government Communications Headquarters.
- Alexander King Bowman, MB, ChB, Senior Administrative Medical Officer, Western Regional Hospital Board, Scotland.
- Josephine Mary Macalister Brew, Education and Training Officer, National Association of Mixed Clubs & Girls' Clubs. (Died 30 May 1957. Dated 30 May 1957).
- Ivor John Carnegie Brown, Author and Journalist.
- John Appleby Brown, JP. For political and public services in Middlesbrough.
- William Brown, OBE, JP, chairman, Chesterfield Savings Committee, Derbyshire.
- The Right Honourable Marie Enid, Baroness Burnham, JP, Chief Commissioner for England, Girl Guides Association.
- Captain Peter Merrick Burrell, Commodore Master, SS Highland Brigade, Royal Mail Lines Ltd.
- Alderman John Lindow Calderwood, chairman, Wiltshire County Council.
- James William Campbell, Financial Adviser to the Iron & Steel Holding and Realisation Agency.
- Gilbert Carmichael, OBE, Secretary, Metropolitan Police Office.
- Edmund Cawkell, MBE, JP. For political and public services in Essex.
- John Benjamin Leslie Clark, Director of Accountancy Services, Ministry of Supply.
- Stanley Clifford, OBE, chairman, Central Milk Distributive Committee.
- Walter Leslie Cottier, Her Majesty's Inspector of Schools (Staff Inspector), Ministry of Education.
- David Paton Cuthbertson, MD, Director, Rowett Research Institute, Bucksburn, Aberdeenshire.
- George Alexander Cassady Devine. For services to the Theatre.
- John Wilfred Edmondson, OBE, Assistant Secretary, Ministry of Agriculture, Fisheries & Food.
- Reginald Lawrence Elkington, Controller, Export Licensing Branch, Board of Trade.
- Norman Randall Elliott, OBE, chairman, South Eastern Electricity Board.
- Group Captain Edward Fennessy, OBE, managing director, Decca Radar Ltd.
- Commander James Buchanan Findlay, DL, Royal Navy (Retd). For political services in Ayrshire.
- Leonard Samuel Flatman, Director of Ordnance Factories (Ammunition), Ministry of Supply.
- George Robert Freeman, chairman, Trustee Savings Bank Inspection Committee.
- William George Gillies, Head of School of Drawing and Painting, Edinburgh College of Art.
- Ernest Walter Godfrey, OBE, Assistant Secretary, Ministry of Transport & Civil Aviation.
- Lieutenant-Colonel John Godman, DL. For public services in Gloucestershire.
- Basil Gray, Keeper of the Department of Oriental Antiquities, British Museum.
- Commander Richard Cecil Dudly Grimes, JP, Royal Navy (Retd). For political and public services in Derby.
- Howard Walker Grimmitt, Chief Engineering Inspector, Ministry of Power.
- Frederic Clare Hawkes, OBE, Secretary, Chartered Auctioneers' & Estate Agents' Institute.
- The Honourable Julian Thurstan Holland-Hibbert, Member, National Advisory Council on the Employment of the Disabled; chairman, National Association for the Paralysed.
- Margaret Neville Hill, chairman, Hill Homes Ltd. For services to the aged.
- Stanley Isaac Hill, Manager, Constructive Department, HM Dockyard, Malta.
- Beatrice Hindley, JP. For political and public services in Lancashire.
- Edmund Langley Hirst, Forbes Professor of Organic Chemistry, University of Edinburgh.
- Percy Holt. For political and public services in Surrey.
- Sibyl Gertrude Horner, MB, BS, Deputy Senior Medical Inspector of Factories, Ministry of Labour & National Service.
- Commodore Robert Lancelot Fortescue Hubbard, RD, RNR (Retd), lately Elder Brother, Corporation of Trinity House.
- Stephen Hudson, Director, Robert Hudson & Sons (Contractors) Ltd., Sunderland.
- Donald Hunter, MD, FRCP, Physician and Director of Research, Industrial Medicine Unit, London Hospital.
- Oliver Lawrence Jacks, MC, JP, chairman and Joint Managing Director, Ashton Brothers & Co. Ltd.
- Reginald Frederick Jenkins, OBE, Assistant Secretary, Air Ministry.
- Edward Martin Furnival Jones, Attached War Office.
- John Edward Robert Griffin Kean, Director of Works & Services (Scotland), Ministry of Works.
- Alderman Charles Henry Knifton, JP, chairman, Middlesex Agricultural Executive Committee.
- Bernard Edwin Lawrence, Chief Education Officer, Essex.
- Edward Le Bas, RA, Painter.
- David Henry Leck, MC, Assistant Solicitor, Office of HM Procurator General & Treasury Solicitor.
- Edmund Oliver Lewis, MRCS, LRCP, Lord Chancellor's Medical Visitor in Lunacy.
- Kathleen Ida Long, Pianist.
- Alderman Henry Lumby, JP. For political and public services in Lancashire.
- Richard Sedgwick McDougall, Treasurer, Hertfordshire County Council.
- John Gilchrist McMeeking, OBE, JP, chairman, Nottingham & District Local Employment Committee.
- James Athole McMillan, OBE, Senior Education & Advisory Officer, National Agricultural Advisory Service, Ministry of Agriculture, Fisheries & Food.
- Fred Marshall, chairman and managing director, Thos. Marshall & Son Ltd., Leeds.
- John Victor Stratton Mills, Resident Magistrate, Belfast. Lately representative of the Ministry of Home Affairs, Northern Ireland, at the United Nations World Congress on the prevention of crime.
- George Thomson Milne, Assistant Secretary, Ministry of Health.
- John Lamb Murray Morrison, Professor of Mechanical Engineering, University of Bristol.
- Andrew James Moyes, OBE, Accountant, Fees Office, House of Commons.
- Patrick Hudson O'Hanlon, Principal Executive Officer, Foreign Office.
- Carola Oman (Carola Mary Anima, Lady Lenanton), Writer.
- Leonard Jack Osborne, Director of Movements, Admiralty.
- Hugh Edmund Pacey, Headmaster, Prince Rupert School, Wilhelmshaven, War Office.
- Hampton Wildman Parker, Keeper of Zoology, British Museum (Natural History).
- James George Pearce, OBE, Director of Research, British Cast Iron Research Association.
- Peter Neville Luard Pears, Singer.
- Sir Charles Alexander Petrie, Bt, Author and Historian.
- Edward Player, managing director, Birmid Industries Ltd.
- Victor Robert Pochin, JP, DL. For public services in Leicestershire.
- Colonel Donald Portway, TD, DL, Representative Member, Territorial & Auxiliary Forces Association, County of Cambridge and Isle of Ely.
- William Henry Ralph Reader, MBE. For services to the Boy Scouts Association.
- Alderman Richard Gruffydd Robinson, JP. For public services in Cardiff.
- Archibald Hugh Houstoun Ross, OBE, lately Director of Forestry for Scotland.
- Cecil Percy James Ruck, Chief Inspector, Immigration Branch, Home Office.
- Alderman Doris, Lady Shepperson, JP. For political and public services in Huntingdonshire.
- Leslie Graham Shrimpton, Principal Executive Officer, Ministry of Pensions & National Insurance.
- Dunstan Skilbeck, Principal, Wye College, University of London.
- Sydney Smith, chairman, Scottish Gas Board.
- Douglas George Sopwith, Director of Mechanical Engineering Research, Department of Scientific and Industrial Research.
- Donald Stephenson, OBE, Controller, Overseas Services, British Broadcasting Corporation.
- Leslie Philip Stephenson, lately chairman, Lincolnshire (Lindsey) Agricultural Executive Committee.
- Maxwell Clifford Tebbitt, Superintending Architect for Public Health Services, Ministry of Housing & Local Government.
- Michael Hubert Tetley, Honorary Treasurer, Dr. Barnardo's Homes.
- Bernard Stephen Townroe, OBE, DL, Secretary-General, Franco-British Society.
- George Edward Tremaine. For political services.
- Charles Malcolm Vignoles, OBE, managing director, Shell-Mex & BP Ltd.
- Alfred Ralph Wagg. For social and philanthropic services.
- Captain Sir Offley Wakeman, Bt, JP, DL, chairman, Shropshire County Council, and chairman, County Councils Association Education Committee.
- Francis William Walker, Convener, Inverness County Council.
- James Walker, chairman, Electricity Board for Northern Ireland.
- Joseph Herbert Watson, MBE, MC, Chemist and Assayer, Royal Mint.
- Francis Jardine Welch, Engineer Surveyor-in Chief, Marine Safety Division, Ministry of Transport & Civil Aviation.
- William Reginald Wheway, JP. For political and public services in Walsall.
- Commander Alfred Martyn Williams, DSC, JP, DL, Royal Navy (Retd). For political and public services in Cornwall.
- Reginald William Woodford, Accountant and Comptroller General, Board of Customs & Excise.
- Ada Anna Woodman, MBE, Chairman of Council, Royal College of Nursing.
- George Grey Wornum, Architect.
- Joseph Wright, OBE, Director, Dunlop Rubber Co. Ltd.

- Major Henry Alwyn Barker, OBE. British subject lately resident in Egypt.
- Harold Godfrey Crawshaw, OBE, lately Assistant Administrator for Finance, International Administration of Tangier.
- Ian Douglas Davidson, lately President of the Compania Shell de Venezuela.
- Lieutenant-Commander Wolstan Beaumont Charles Weld Forester, RN, (Retd), lately Her Majesty's Consul-General at Nice.
- James Darsie Gillie, Manchester Guardian Correspondent at Paris.
- Herbert Morgan Jones, lately General Manager of the Anglo-Egyptian Oilfields Ltd., Cairo.
- Brandon Laight, OBE, lately Headmaster of the English School, Cairo.
- Alan Guy Elliot-Smith, lately Headmaster of Victoria College, Cairo.
- Brigadier John William Ferguson Treadwell (Retd), vice-president and Director of the English-Speaking Union of the United States.
- Keith Courtney Acutt. For services to Industry in the Federation of Rhodesia and Nyasaland.
- Archibald Simpson Anderson, MB, FRACS, Honorary Consultant Ophthalmic Surgeon to the Victorian Eye & Ear Hospital, State of Victoria.
- Arthur Beggs, of Beaufort, State of Victoria. For services to Agriculture.
- Lieutenant-Colonel John Frederick Page Burt, MVO, Official Secretary to the Governor of the State of Western Australia.
- Thomas Warden Cree, a prominent Member of the United Kingdom community in Karachi, Pakistan.
- Benjamin Thomas Edye, ChM, FRCS, Honorary Consulting Surgeon to the Royal Prince Alfred Hospital and other institutions in the State of New South Wales.
- Russell England, OBE, JP, Chairman of the European Advisory Council, Bechuanaland Protectorate.
- Chief Bathoen Seeapitso Gaseitsiwe, OBE, of the Bangwaketse Tribe, Bechuanaland Protectorate, Chairman of the African Advisory Council for the Protectorate.
- Charles Henry Hand. For public services in the State of Tasmania.
- Gilbert Sherman McDonald, OBE, deputy director of Education, State of South Australia.
- Robert Jackson Noble, Under-Secretary and Permanent Head of the Department of Agriculture, State of New South Wales.
- Stanley Mortimer Pechey, Southern Rhodesia representative on the Governing Board of the Rhodesian Iron & Steel Company.
- Councillor William Ernest Roff, of Ballaarat, State of Victoria.
- Arthur Leslie Brice Bennett, OBE, DFC. For public services in Tanganyika.
- Allan Shaw Campbell, JP. For public services in Jamaica.
- Eugene Aubrey Pyfrom Dupuch. For public services in the Bahamas.
- Cyril Charles Emmett, Chairman of the Nigerian Coal Corporation, Federation of Nigeria.
- William Douglas Farrington, Chief Inspecting Engineer, Office of the Crown Agents for Oversea Governments & Administrations.
- Cecil Gordon Harrison, General Manager and chairman, Railway and Port Swettenham Boards, Malayan Railway, Federation of Malaya.
- Joshua Abraham Hassan, MVO, JP. For public services in Gibraltar.
- Samuel Horton Oluwole Jones, OBE, MB, ChB, Director of Medical Services, Gambia.
- George Kinnear, OBE. Lately Director, East African Standard, Kenya.
- Lieutenant-Commander Geoffrey Michael Knocker, Malayan Royal Naval Volunteer Reserve. For public services in the Federation of Malaya.
- Philip Lee Tau Sang, OBE. For public services in North Borneo.
- Clifford Lewis. For public services in Uganda.
- James Alexander Macdonald, Deputy Inspector-General, Nigeria Police Force.
- William Thomas Mackell, OBE. Lately Chief Federal Adviser on Education, Federation of Nigeria.
- Guy Charles Madoc, Director of Intelligence, Federation of Malaya.
- Ernest Steven Monteiro, MD, FRFPS, Dean of the Faculty of Medicine and Professor of Clinical Medicine, University of Malaya.
- Maurice Scott, DFC. For public services in Fiji.
- Anthony Arthur Shillingford, Director of Education, Northern Region, Nigeria, now Chief Federal Advisor on Education, Federation of Nigeria.
- William George Syer, Commissioner, Sierra Leone Police Force.
- The Right Reverend Frank Oswald Thorne, MC, Bishop of Nyasaland.
- Michael William Turner, JP. For public services in Hong Kong.
- James Bowie White, Director, Roads Organisation, Uganda.
- Hugh Oliver Beresford Wooding, QC. For public services in Trinidad.
- Frederick Henry Woodrow, OBE, Director of Public Works, Tanganyika.

Honorary Commander

- Abdul Aziz bin Haji Abdul Majid, Mentri Besar, Selangor, Federation of Malaya.

==== Officer of the Order of the British Empire (OBE) ====
Military Division

Royal Navy

- Commander Frederick Arthur Kemmis Betty, VRD, Royal Naval Volunteer Reserve.
- Commander Arthur Francis Blowers.
- Commander (A) Norman Henry Bovey, DSC, Royal Naval Volunteer Reserve.
- Chief Officer Sheila Helen Broster, Women's Royal Naval Service.
- Commander George Walter Dibben.
- Commander Hugh William Falcon-Steward, (Retd).
- Major John Norman Hedley, DSO, Royal Marines.
- The Reverend Jack Newton Charles Holland, Chaplain.
- Commander Frederick Ross James.
- Surgeon Commander James Lees, MRCS, LRCP.
- Commander James George Patrick Douglas Long, (Retd).
- Commander Derek Roy Mallinson.
- Acting Commander John Frederick Stewart.
- Instructor Commander John Russell Thorp.

Additional Officers

In recognition of distinguished services in the Operations in the Near East, October–December 1956.

- Captain Albert Victor Barton, Master, RFA Brown Ranger.
- Major Basil Ian Spencer Gourlay, MBE, MC, 3 Commando Brigade, Royal Marines.
- Commander Edward Findley Gueritz, DSC.
- Lieutenant-Commander (then Acting Commander) Lionel Geoffrey Lyne, DSC, HMS Forth.
- Commander William Charles Simpson, DSC, HMS Eagle.

Army

- Lieutenant-Colonel Malcolm Stewart Balmain, MBE (64148), 15th/19th The King's Royal Hussars, Royal Armoured Corps (Employed List).
- Lieutenant-Colonel John Webb Beazley, TD (64307), Royal Regiment of Artillery, Territorial Army.
- Lieutenant-Colonel (temporary) John Reginald Blomfield, MC (67063), Corps of Royal Engineers.
- Lieutenant-Colonel Peter Carstairs Buchanan, MC, TD (66802), The Duke of Cornwall's Light Infantry, Territorial Army.
- Lieutenant-Colonel Norah Kathleen Cadden (211199), Women's Royal Army Corps.
- Lieutenant-Colonel Alastair Cameron, MBE (47530), Royal Regiment of Artillery.
- Colonel (local) (now Lieutenant-Colonel (temporary)) James Noel Cowley (170308) 10th Royal Hussars (Prince of Wales's Own), Royal Armoured Corps.
- Lieutenant-Colonel John Brynmor Davies (194591), Royal Army Service Corps.
- Lieutenant-Colonel Clifford Mayhew Dodkins, DSO (380533), 3rd Carabiniers (Prince of Wales's Dragoon Guards), Royal Armoured Corps (Employed List).
- Brevet Lieutenant-Colonel Robert Gordon-Finlayson, MBE (69036), Royal Regiment of Artillery.
- Lieutenant-Colonel Roger John Gary Fleming, TD (74255), Royal Regiment of Artillery, Territorial Army (now TARO).
- Lieutenant-Colonel Hugh Raymond Grace (52622), The Buffs (Royal East Kent Regiment).
- Lieutenant-Colonel Michael Charles Kirkpatrick Halford, DSO, MBE (62867), The York & Lancaster Regiment.
- Lieutenant-Colonel (Quartermaster) Charles William Victor Hankinson (152772), Army Physical Training Corps.
- Lieutenant-Colonel George Douglas Travis Harris (58060), Royal Corps of Signals.
- Major Beverley Harold Holloway, TD (256867), Corps of Royal Engineers, Territorial Army.
- Lieutenant-Colonel (temporary) William Leonard Horton (214316), Royal Regiment of Artillery.
- Brevet Lieutenant-Colonel William Godfrey Fothergill Jackson, MC (73056), Corps of Royal Engineers.
- Lieutenant-Colonel Alan Albert Martin-Jenkins, TD (134026), Royal Army Ordnance Corps.
- Lieutenant-Colonel (acting) Ernest Marchant Kenber, TD (64020), Combined Cadet Force.
- Lieutenant-Colonel Richard Cumberland Laughton, MBE (63514), Royal Regiment of Artillery.
- Lieutenant-Colonel Henry Lowther Ewart Clark Leask, DSO, MBE (62419), The Royal Scots Fusiliers (Employed List).
- Lieutenant-Colonel Roy Leyland (65469), The East Surrey Regiment.
- Lieutenant-Colonel Alexander Robert Taylor Lundie, MC, MB(94926), Royal Army Medical Corps.
- Lieutenant-Colonel (now Colonel) William Lords Mather, MC, TD (66950), The Cheshire Yeomanry (Earl of Chester's), Royal Armoured Corps, Territorial Army.
- Lieutenant-Colonel (temporary) Maurice William Mountain (66139), The Border Regiment.
- Lieutenant-Colonel (Quartermaster) Charles Herbert Patrick, MBE (88573), Royal Corps of Signals (now retired).
- Lieutenant-Colonel (acting) Francis Wheatly Patrick, TD (39528), Army Cadet Force.
- Lieutenant-Colonel (temporary) Peter Algernon Rodney Reyne, MC (391532), Royal Regiment of Artillery.
- Lieutenant-Colonel Michael William Temple Roberts, MBE (62879), The Green Howards (Alexandra, Princess of Wales's Own Yorkshire Regiment) (Employed List).
- Lieutenant-Colonel Harold Arthur Hughes Sheppard (63424), Corps of Royal Electrical & Mechanical Engineers.
- Lieutenant-Colonel Maurice Irving Silverton, TD, MRCS, LRCP, DPH (72620), Royal Army Medical Corps, Territorial Army.
- Lieutenant-Colonel Ronald Guy Swadling (129776), Royal Regiment of Artillery, Territorial Army.
- Lieutenant-Colonel (temporary) Maude Tompkins (234261), Women's Royal Army Corps.
- Lieutenant-Colonel David Noel Hugh Tyacke (66134), The Duke of Cornwall's Light Infantry.
- Lieutenant-Colonel Richard Christopher Patrick Wheeler (158235), City of London Yeomanry (Rough Riders), Territorial Army (now TARO).
- Lieutenant-Colonel (acting) Ronald Warren Whitmore, TD (76008), Combined Cadet Force.
- Lieutenant-Colonel (acting) Richard Thomas Meurig Williams, MC, TD (190713), Royal Regiment of Artillery, Territorial Army.
- Lieutenant-Colonel (temporary) Peter Geoffrey Wykeham, MC (56419), The King's Shropshire Light Infantry.
- Lieutenant-Colonel (temporary) (Staff Paymaster, 1st Class) Cedric Lionel Herbert Young (125074), Royal Army Pay Corps.
- Lieutenant-Colonel (temporary) Eric Arnold Heaslip (EC.4266), Special List (ex-Indian Army). Until recently on loan to the Government of India.
- Lieutenant-Colonel Paul Hengrave Kitson, Basutoland Mounted Police.
- Lieutenant-Colonel Raymond Hubert Stone, Rhodesia and Nyasaland Staff Corps.
- Lieutenant-Colonel Ronald Alexander McInnes, MC, Commanding Officer, Negri Sembilan Home Guard, Federation of Malaya.
- Lieutenant-Colonel Lawrence Joseph West, Commanding Officer, Selangor Home Guard, Federation of Malaya.

Additional Officers

In recognition of distinguished services in the Operations in the Near East, October–December 1956.

- Lieutenant-Colonel Thomas Holroyd Gibbon (66187), Royal Tank Regiment.
- Lieutenant-Colonel Arthur Compton Lewis (64532), Corps of Royal Engineers.
- Lieutenant-Colonel (Temporary) Stuart John Cornfoot, MVO, MBE, ERD (85748), Corps of Royal Engineers.
- Major Geoffrey Wingfield Shepherd, MBE (74564), Corps of Royal Engineers.

Royal Air Force

- Wing Commander William Alexander Covill (21294).
- Wing Commander John Frank Davis, DFC, AFC (78867).
- Wing Commander Charles Walter Hayes (123491).
- Wing Commander Francis Victor Morello (39256).
- Wing Commander Charles Trengrove Nance (89935).
- Wing Commander Donald Arthur Pocock (102191), Royal Air Force Regiment.
- Wing Commander Robert Edgar Guy Van der Kiste, DSO (39248).
- Wing Commander David Evelyn Alfred Williams (37581).
- Acting Wing Commander Albert Longhurst (114790), Royal Air Force Volunteer Reserve (Training Branch).
- Squadron Leader Douglas Ian Benham, DFC, AFC (104443).
- Squadron Leader William Cuthill Blair (119709).
- Squadron Leader Sydney William Kenneth Hart (167819).
- Squadron Leader James Carlyle Marmion (165684).
- Squadron Officer Sheila Penelope Titcombe (3832), Women's Royal Air Force.
- Squadron Leader John Asquith Wilson (130824).
- Acting Squadron Leader Peter Howard, MB, BS (502025).
- Acting Squadron Leader Philip Armett Inman (58640).
- Acting Squadron Leader Arthur John Wainwright, MB, BS (502218).

Additional Officers

In recognition of distinguished services in the Operations in the Near East, October–December 1956.

- Wing Commander Edward Charles Ashley (45192).
- Squadron Leader Robert Henry Collins Hustwith (151796).
- Squadron Leader John Henry Lowes, AFC (43936).
- Squadron Leader John Alexander Gwynne Tucker (168600).

Civil Division

- Richard Acheson. For political services in County Tyrone.
- Edmund Patrick Grove Annesley, lately managing director, Omo Sawmills, subsidiary of the Colonial Development Corporation, Nigeria.
- Alfred Henry Appleyard, Principal Clerk to the Corporation of Lloyd's.
- Donald Charles James Arnold, Chief Constable, Cambridgeshire Constabulary.
- Herbert Louis Nicholson Ascough, Divisional Manager, Cable & Wireless (West Indies) Ltd., Barbados.
- Joseph Louis Barentz, Senior Inspector of Taxes, Board of Inland Revenue.
- Nellie Beer, JP, Member, Interdepartmental Committee on Horticultural Marketing.
- Colin Stanley Knowles Benham, Director, Benham & Sons Ltd.
- Ernest Henry Betts, Deputy Controller, Telecommunications Liaison Group, War Office.
- Walter John Searles Bew, Clerk, Essex River Board.
- Alderman Harry Bolland. For political and public services in the West Riding of Yorkshire.
- Norman Loftus Bor, CIE, assistant director, Royal Botanic Gardens, Kew.
- Alfred Stanley Bowes, First Class Valuer, Board of Inland Revenue.
- Harold Wiblen Brown. For political and public services in Luton.
- William George Bunday, Deputy Chief Investigation Officer, Board of Customs & Excise.
- Arthur William Bunnage, Head Postmaster, Stockport, Cheshire.
- Gilbert John Tudway Cains, Chief Officer, Nottingham Fire Brigade.
- James William Calder, Senior District Inspector of Mines & Quarries, North Eastern Division, Ministry of Power.
- William Henry Capper, JP. For public services in Warrington.
- Arthur William Chapman, Registrar, University of Sheffield.
- Rowland Charlton, MBE, JP, Alderman, Andover Borough Council.
- Leslie George Child, Principal, Ministry of Transport & Civil Aviation.
- Hugh Whitmore Christie. For political and public services in Kent.
- Philip Richard Clipsham, MBE, Principal, Commonwealth Relations Office.
- David Spence Clouston, Veterinary Surgeon, Zetland.
- Charles Coates, assistant director of Finance, Ministry of Transport & Civil Aviation.
- Frederick James Cochrane, JP, President, Irish Football Association.
- Alderman Arthur Benjamin Cooke, JP, chairman, Local Health Committee, Gloucestershire County Council.
- Mabel Alice Dobbin Crawford, MD, FRCSI, Medical Officer, Ministry of Supply.
- The Reverend Canon Louis Warden Crooks, Parliamentary Chaplain, Parliament of Northern Ireland.
- Herbert George Ovard Cross, MBE, lately deputy director of Naval Information, Admiralty.
- Eugene John Cruft, MVO. For services to Music.
- William Victor Curtis, Honorary Secretary, Forces Help Society & Lord Roberts Workshops, South Essex.
- Cyril Mangnall Davies, Deputy-Chairman, Manchester Savings Committee.
- Herbert William Dawson, Organist and Master of the Choir, St. Margaret's Church, Westminster.
- Jack James Bampfylde Dempster, Deputy Chief Education Officer, Southampton.
- Rose Myfanwy Dewey, Her Majesty's Inspector of Schools, Ministry of Education.
- William Burton Doak, Chief Inspector of Schools, Ministry of Education, Northern Ireland.
- Colvin Edward Docker, Chief Engineer, Coastal Command, Royal Air Force.
- John William Dodd, chairman, Pontypridd Local Employment Committee.
- Mary Katherine Dorothy Douglas, MB, ChB(Ed). For political and public services in Fife.
- Herbert Langdon Dowsett. For political and public services in Essex.
- John Horsfall Dyde, Deputy Chairman, Eastern Gas Board.
- Margery Helen Edwards, Headmistress, Gleed County Secondary Girls' School, Spalding.
- Bernard Albert Ellis, Senior Principal Scientific Officer, Government Chemist's Department.
- Bernard Myrddin Evans, Grade I Officer, Ministry of Labour & National Service.
- Einion Evans, Representative of the British Council, Wales.
- Harold Fairbank, Director, Luddington Experimental Horticulture Station, Ministry of Agriculture, Fisheries & Food.
- John Herbert Farmer. For social and charitable services in Guernsey.
- John Carter Fidler, Principal Scientific Officer, Food Investigation Organisation, Department of Scientific & Industrial Research.
- Ronald Field, Member of the Central Youth Employment Executive, Ministry of Labour & National Service, representing the Ministry of Education.
- Peter Farquhar Flett, Senior Marine Salvage Officer, Mediterranean and Malta.
- George Ford, Assistant Chief Architect, Ministry of Works.
- Sidney Colwyn Foulkes. For services to architecture in Wales.
- Captain Bernard Cecil Frost, Flight Captain, British Overseas Airways Corporation.
- Frank Gardner, Principal, Carlisle Technical College.
- Thomas Philip Garland, Clerk, Monmouthshire & Newport Executive Council.
- William Alfred Gething, lately Senior Chief Executive Officer, Public Works Loan Board.
- George Isaac Gibbons, Chief Labour Officer, Courtaulds Ltd.
- George Cruickshank Gilbert, JP, Provost of the Royal Burgh of North Berwick, East Lothian.
- Gordon Gilchrist, Chief Accountant, Supreme Court Pay Office, Supreme Court of Judicature.
- Arthur Glover, Head of Technical Research, Co-operative Wholesale Society Ltd., Manchester.
- Alderman Ioan Ynyr Glynne, MC, chairman, Caernarvon & Blaenau Festiniog National Insurance Appeal Tribunals.
- Ann Armstrong Graham, Principal Nursing Officer, Northumberland County Council.
- John Grant, Chief Constable, Burgh Police Headquarters, Kilmarnock.
- Percy Victor Norman Grayling, chief executive officer, Export Credits Guarantee Department.
- Arthur Griffiths, JP, Member, North Western Regional Board for Industry.
- John William Hall, Senior Inspector (Horticulture), Department of Agriculture for Scotland.
- Tom Harker, MC, Headmaster, Chester-le-Street (Secondary) Modern School, County Durham.
- Harold Cecil Harper, Chief Accountant, National Dock Labour Board.
- Colonel Carrique Edgar Lewin-Harris, DL, Secretary, Territorial and Auxiliary Forces Association, County of Somerset.
- Stanley Charles Camps Harris, JP, Member, South Eastern Metropolitan Regional Hospital Board.
- Mary Margaretta Embrey Harrison, MBE, chief executive officer, Foreign Office.
- Francis John Hartwell, Principal Scientific Officer, Safety in Mines Research Establishment, Ministry of Power.
- Richard Selwyn Haskew, chairman and managing director, General Chemical & Pharmaceutical Co. Ltd.
- John Haslett, MC, Deputy Chief Inspector Board of Customs & Excise.
- William Ivor Hawkes, chief executive officer, Board of Trade.
- Maurice Hewitt Hawkins, MBE, Principal, Air Ministry.
- Alderman Ernest George Heal, JP, Deputy Chairman, Isle of Wight Agricultural Executive Committee.
- Maurice James Hellier, County Planning Officer, Derbyshire.
- Ernest Harold Hickery, chairman, East Wales Local Productivity Committee.
- Frank Hill, Regional House Coal Officer, North Midland Region, House Coal Distribution (Emergency) Scheme.
- Richard Norton Hollyer, Representative of the British Council, Ghana.
- Alderman Frederick Holmes, Chairman of the Managers, Castle Howard Approved School, Hull.
- Strother Smith Hopkins, County Inspector, Royal Ulster Constabulary.
- Harold Robert Hubert, Senior Chief Executive Officer, War Office.
- Penrhyn Stanley Hudson, Director, Commonwealth Bureau of Plant Breeding & Genetics.
- Frederick William Isard, Alderman, Bromley Town Council.
- Captain Kenneth Wallwyn James, Royal Navy (Retd), Senior Chief Executive Officer, Government Communications Headquarters.
- Francis Wynn Jones, Grade 2 Officer, Ministry of Labour & National Service.
- Griffith Vernon Wynne Jones, JP. For political and public services in South Wales.
- Robert William Kelley, Principal Regional Officer, North West Metropolitan & Southern Hospital Areas, Ministry of Health.
- Francis Haughton Kelly. For political services in Leicester.
- Lieutenant-Commander Philip William Thomas Kime, RNVR. For political services in Hertfordshire.
- Heinz Koeppler, Warden, Wilton Park Centre, Steyning, Foreign Office.
- Alderman Frederick Lawrence, JP. For public services in Paddington.
- Charles Louis Lawton, Chief Actuary, York County Savings Bank.
- Bernard Leslie Lelliott, MBE, Chief Welfare Officer, Associated Portland Cement Manufacturers Ltd.
- Alderman Mary Dorothy Lewis, MBE, JP, chairman, South Wales Street Groups Advisory Savings Committee.
- Alderman Alfred Herbert Little, JP, For public services in Bournemouth.
- Gwynneth Nesta McCleary, Principal, Board of Trade.
- James McClenaghan, chairman, Larne Harbour Ltd., County Antrim.
- Leslie Ashby Macdonnell, Member Variety Sub-Committee, Combined Services Entertainment Advisory Committee.
- John Alexander McGregor, Burgh Engineer, Surveyor & Planning Officer, Paisley.
- Harry Roy Mackay, Firemaster, South Western Area Fire Brigade, Scotland.
- Ellen Jane McLaughlin, Headmistress, Lawside Roman Catholic Academy, Dundee.
- Donald Alexander Stewart McLeish, For political services in Glasgow.
- Maud Lilburn MacLellan, TD, Corps Commander, Women's Transport Service (First Aid Nursing Yeomanry).
- Herbert Blythe Mallalieu, Principal Intelligence Officer, War Office.
- Alderman Howard Rothwell Mallett. Assistant County Commissioner for Relationship, Cambridgeshire, Boy Scouts Association.
- Edith Louise Manley, MBE, Regional Administrator, Northern Region, Women's Voluntary Services.
- Edward Grey Marchant, MBE, chief executive officer, Air Ministry.
- Noel John Margetts, lately chief executive officer, Admiralty.
- Henry Alfred Metayers, Senior Architect, Home Office.
- Commander Thomas Gerald Michelmore, RD, RNR (Retd), Chief Inspector of Lifeboats, Royal National Lifeboat Institution.
- Lieutenant-Colonel Harold Mighall, Chief Constable, Southport Borough Police.
- David Forbes Milne, Generation Engineer, North of Scotland Hydro-Electric Board, Tummel Valley Stations.
- George Morrison, managing director, Greenock Dockyard Co. Ltd.
- William Morrison Morrison, Principal, Scottish Education Department.
- Edward Reginald Mount, Principal Information Officer, Central Office of Information.
- Alexander Ernest Munro, Principal Surveyor for Japan, Lloyd's Register of Shipping.
- Major Robert Alistair Murray. For political and public services in Scotland.
- Helen Mary Murtagh, Member, Board of Governors, United Birmingham Hospitals.
- The Honourable Lucia Charlotte Susan FitzRoy-Newdegate, JP. For political and public services in Warwickshire.
- Lieutenant-Colonel Augustus Charles Newman, VC, TD, DL, Director, W. & C. French Ltd., Civil Engineering and Public Works Contractors, Essex.
- John Hewley Outhwaite Noble, Deputy Controller, Scotland. Ministry of Pensions & National Insurance.
- Thomas Park Noble, Chief Engineer, SS Edinburgh Castle, Union Castle Mail Steamship Co. Ltd.
- Cyril Vernon Oliver, JP, chairman, Maidstone & District Local Employment Committee.
- Arthur Douglas Parham, Deputy Chief Housing and Planning Inspector, Ministry of Housing & Local Government
- Arthur Reginald Parr, District Auditor, Ministry of Housing & Local Government.
- Lieutenant-Colonel James Beaumont Worsley Pennyman, JP, DL. For public services in the North Riding of Yorkshire.
- John Alexander Philip, managing director, Philip and Son Ltd., Dartmouth.
- Alfred Samuel Charles Phillips, Principal Production Engineer, Admiralty.
- John Francis Phillips, Lately Assistant General Secretary, National Farmers' Union.
- The Reverend Martin Wallis Pinker, General Secretary, National Association of Discharged Prisoners Aid Societies.
- William Henry Pocock, JP, Member, Traffic Commissioners, South Eastern Traffic Area.
- Cecil Norman Potter, County Commissioner, Middlesex, Boy Scouts Association.
- Brigadier James Maudsley Rawcliffe, MC, TD. For political services.
- Frank Aubrey Rawlings, Finance Officer, Central Electricity Authority.
- Augustus Cecil Reeve, MBE, chief executive officer, HM Treasury.
- Arthur Reginald Albert Rendall, Head of Designs Department, British Broadcasting Corporation.
- Alderman Sidney Frank Rich. For political and public services in Wandsworth.
- Frederick Lubovius Richard, MB, ChB, Commissioner, St. John Ambulance Brigade, Staffordshire.
- Alfred Richardson, Deputy Public Relations Adviser, Prime Minister's Office.
- Walter James Robinson, assistant director of Stores, Admiralty.
- Michael Joseph Ronayne, Chief Engineer, Ford Motor Co. Ltd.
- Olive Mary Rudd, JP. For political and public services in Exeter.
- James Henry Rule, MBE, Member, National Savings Assembly, South Buckinghamshire.
- Susan Ryder. For services to Displaced Persons and Refugees in Western Germany.
- Walter Howard Scarborough, Telephone Manager, Canterbury, General Post Office.
- Edward Shanks, Principal Officer, Ministry of Finance, Northern Ireland.
- Captain Henry Alldred Shaw, Master, SS Pacific Fortune, Furness Withy & Co. Ltd.
- Neil Shaw, lately President, An Comunn Gàidhealach (The Highland Association).
- Ronald Andrew Shaw, assistant director, Aircraft Research, Ministry of Supply.
- Herbert Basil Sheasby, MBE, JP, Joint Secretary, National Federation of Wholesale Grocers & Provision Merchants.
- Henry Arthur Thomas Simmonds, Deputy County Commissioner, London, Boy Scouts Association.
- William John Simmons, JP, chairman, Berkshire Agricultural Executive Committee.
- Thomas Haines Sims, Senior Medical Officer, Ministry of Pensions & National Insurance.
- Arthur Roy Slyth, deputy director of Audit, Exchequer and Audit Department.
- Norman Arthur Smedley, Finance Officer and Chief Accountant, Post Office Headquarters, Scotland.
- John Smiles, Senior Scientific Officer, Department of Biophysics & Optics, National Institute for Medical Research.
- The Honourable Marjorie Methwold Constantine-Smith. For political and public services in Lancashire and Cheshire.
- Thomas Robert Howey Smith, JP, chairman, Jarrow & Hebburn Disablement Advisory Committee.
- Alderman Emanuel Snowman. For public services in Hampstead.
- Herbert George Spencer, JP, Deputy Chairman, Monmouthshire Agricultural Executive Committee.
- Joanna Ravenscroft Spicer, Head of Programme Planning, Television Service, British Broadcasting Corporation.
- Reginald Stacey, Principal, Ministry of Agriculture, Fisheries & Food.
- William Joe Stern, Principal Scientific Officer, Ministry of Defence.
- Clifford William Stevens. For political and public services in Portsmouth.
- George Alexander Stevens, Honorary Secretary, Post Office Fellowship of Remembrance.
- Charles Stewart, Principal Inspector of Taxes, Board of Inland Revenue.
- Albert Leonard Story, Senior Principal Scientific Officer, Air Ministry.
- John Terence Sutton, Higher Waterguard Superintendent, Board of Customs & Excise.
- Herbert Thomas Symons, chairman, Bournemouth War Pensions Committee.
- Alderman Ellen Maud Thornton. For public services in Eastbourne.
- John Thomas Tomblin, Superintendent, Planning Trials Division, Atomic Weapons Research Establishment, Aldermaston.
- Lionel Peter Twiss, DSC, Chief Test Pilot, Fairey Aviation Co. Ltd.
- Claude Anderson George Wallis, Principal, Colonial Office.
- Ernest Victor Walshe, Town Planning Officer, Belfast Corporation.
- Sidney Francis Ward, chief executive officer, Ministry of Works.
- Wyndham Evelyn Holmes Watkins, Consulting Engineer and Architect, South Wales.
- Ronald Wentworth, Principal, Ministry of Agriculture, Fisheries & Food.
- Walter Westin, Grade 2 Officer, Ministry of Labour & National Service.
- Gordon Weston, Technical Director, British Standards Institution.
- Edward Whitworth, Deputy Research Manager, Imperial Chemical Industries Ltd (Nobel Division), Ardeer.
- Richard Hilditch Williams, Senior Railway Employment Inspector, Ministry of Transport & Civil Aviation.
- Thomas Hamilton Wilson, Secretary, Herring Industry Board.
- Victor Henry Wilton, assistant director of Aircraft Production, Ministry of Supply.
- Harry Charles Wood, chairman, Deeside & District Savings Committee.
- William Wood, MB, BS, Head of Virus Research Unit, Glaxo Laboratories Ltd.
- The Reverend Canon Howard Frank Woolnough, Wing Chaplain, Manchester Wing, and chairman, Chaplains' Committee, Air Training Corps.
- Arthur Wragg, Manager, Shell Department, and Chief Metallurgist, Vickers-Armstrongs (Engineers) Ltd., Newcastle upon Tyne.
- Sydney James Wrigglesworth, Director and General Manager, Oldham & Sons Ltd., Denton, Manchester.
- Joseph Gilbert Yardley, MBE, Secretary, Bath & West and Southern Counties Society.
- Dora Abdela, British subject resident in Monaco.
- Fergus Lee Dempster, DSC, lately Second Secretary at Her Majesty's Embassy in Saigon.
- Charles Edward Hobart Druitt, MC, Assistant Petroleum Attaché at Her Majesty's Embassy in Washington.
- John Edmund Fox, General Manager of the Turyag Company, İzmir.
- Albert Victor Goudie, British Consul at Coquimbo.
- William Bertram Hesmondhalgh, lately First Secretary (Information), United Kingdom Delegation to the United Nations, New York.
- Geoffrey Lionel Henry Hitchcock, British Council Representative in Austria.
- Alfred Horace King, lately Manager of British Coaling Depots Ltd., Port Tewfik.
- Robert Littlejohn, British subject resident in Argentina.
- Howard Sydney Meech, British Governor of the Allied National Prison, Werl.
- Leslie Mitchell, First Secretary (Labour) at Her Majesty's Embassy in Rio de Janeiro.
- Walter Thomas Rees, a Director of Messrs. Hull, Blyth & Co. (Port Said) Ltd., lately of Port Said.
- Colonel Michael Joseph O'Brien-Twohig, Superintending Queen's Foreign Service Messenger.
- Henry James Walker, lately Assistant Cultural Attaché at Her Majesty's Embassy in Bonn.
- William John Wilkinson, General Manager of the Banque-de-Commerce, Antwerp.
- Captain Guy Dingwall Williams, MC, British Vice-Consul at Jerez de la Frontera.
- Karl Frederick Waverling Woods, lately Chief Engineer, Iraqi State Railways.
- Paulin Frederick Barrett, MBE, Under-Secretary, Ministry of Transport & Works, Federation of Rhodesia and Nyasaland.
- Thomas James Biggs, MB, ChM, Vice Chairman of the Board of Management, and Senior Physician, Mater Misericordiae Hospital, Sydney, State of New South Wales.
- John Brown. For municipal services in the State of New South Wales.
- The Reverend James Maxwell Burton, a missionary in Basutoland. For services to African Education.
- Lieutenant-Colonel George Griffith Ffloyd Chomley. For social welfare services in the Marandellas/Wedza District, Southern Rhodesia.
- The Honourable John Alexander Ferguson, formerly a Member of the Industrial Commission in the State of New South Wales. For public services.
- Noel Gerald Carleton Gane, FRCS(Ed), a Consultant Surgeon, of Salisbury, in the Federation of Rhodesia and Nyasaland.
- Anne Blanche Alice Gordon, MBE. For honorary services rendered under the auspices of organisations for the care of the Blind and Physically Handicapped in the Federation of Rhodesia and Nyasaland.
- Robert Joseph Hawkes, Chairman of the Ambulance Transport Service Board, State of New South Wales.
- Peter Hughes, District Commissioner, Maseru, Basutoland.
- Acting Chief Constructor-Captain Leonard Kirkpatrick, Royal Corps of Naval Constructors, detached for loan service to the Indian Navy.
- Edward Acton Lloyd, Chief Commissioner of the Boy Scouts Organisation in the State of New South Wales.
- John Arthur King Martyn, Headmaster of The Doon School, Dehra Dun, India.
- Otto Mastbaum, Malaria Medical Officer, Swaziland Medical Service.
- Donald McLennan, JP, of Scottsdale, State of Tasmania. For public services.
- Jean Eileen Muntz, President of the Royal College of Nursing in the State of Victoria.
- John Francis Chalmers Park, musical director of the Bulawayo Municipal Orchestra, Southern Rhodesia.
- Julia Rapke, Special Magistrate, Children's Courts, State of Victoria.
- Alderman Walter Frederick Riddiford, Mayor of the City of Broken Hill, State of New South Wales.
- Councillor Robert Monteith Rolland, Sale Town Council, State of Victoria.
- The Reverend Gordon Rowe, President of the Methodist Conference, State of South Australia. For social welfare services, particularly to Aborigines.
- Tom Ceilings Stephens, formerly Garden Suburb Commissioner, State of South Australia.
- Sidney Bruce Williams, ISO, Administrative Officer, Swaziland.
- Bryan Abbott, MBE, Administrative Officer, Western Region, Nigeria.
- Chief Samuel Adeloye Aboluwodi. For services to the Co-operative Movement in the Western Region, Nigeria.
- Stanley Vernon Adams, JP, City Secretary & Treasurer, George Town, Penang, Federation of Malaya.
- Joseph Antoine Hermann Andre, MBE, MRCS, LRCP, deputy director of Medical Services, Mauritius.
- Arthur Henry Armitage, Overseas Audit Service, deputy director of Audit, Singapore.
- Marie Grace Augustin. For public services in St. Lucia, Windward Islands.
- Frederick William Bailey, Controller of Government Stores, Northern Rhodesia.
- George Percy Bargery, Translator, British and Foreign Bible Society, Northern Region, Nigeria.
- Max Barnett For public services in Northern Rhodesia.
- Humphrey Malomo Samuel Boardman, LRCS, LRCP, assistant director of Medical Services, Sierra Leone.
- Major David Ronald Bridges, Blind Welfare Officer, Department of Social Welfare, Federation of Malaya.
- Ronald Ernest Brown, Permanent Secretary, Ministry of Justice & Local Government, Western Region, Nigeria.
- Herbert Charles Butcher, DSC, deputy director of Chemistry, Federation of Malaya.
- William Ernest Calton, Government Chemist, Tanganyika.
- Chan Chi On. For public services in North Borneo.
- Ainslie Bennett Leigh Clarke, Administrative Officer, Federation of Malaya.
- Edward James Cooper. For public services in Johore, Federation of Malaya.
- Sidney Ernest Coppen, Senior Engineer, Mechanical Engineering Department, Office of the Crown Agents for Oversea Governments & Administrations.
- Alfred John Craig, MD, FRCS. For medical services in Malta.
- Ivan Robert Dale. Lately Deputy Chief Conservator of Forests, Uganda.
- Florence Evelyn Daysh. For social and welfare services in Barbados.
- Muthiah Doraisingham, Deputy Permanent Secretary to the Ministry of Health & Deputy Director of Medical Services, Singapore.
- William Henry Especkerman, MBE, Assistant to the Private Secretary to the Governor, Singapore.
- Mabel Lucy Everett, Queen Elizabeth Overseas Nursing Service, Principal Matron, Medical Department, Hong Kong.
- John Cartwright Braddon Fisher, Administrative Officer, Sarawak.
- Gilbert Maxwell Fletcher, Deputy Establishment Secretary, Uganda.
- Margaret Ferguson Gartshore, Headmistress, St. Andrew High School for Girls, Jamaica.
- Allan James Gerard, Chief Generation Engineer, Central Electricity Board, Federation of Malaya.
- Frederick William Goodwin, Government Printer and Comptroller of Stationery, Zanzibar.
- John William Gregory, Comptroller of Customs & Excise, British Guiana.
- Charles Curtis Harris, Administrative Officer, Tanganyika.
- Alhaji Isa Kaita, Minister of Natural Resources, Northern Region, Nigeria.
- Miriam Janisch, Assistant Director-of Education, Kenya.
- Captain Robert Philip Johnstone. For public services in Trinidad.
- Anne Laugharne Phillips Griffith-Jones, MBE. For services to education in the Federation of Malaya.
- Chief Majebere bin Masanja, MBE, Chief of Mwagalla Chiefdom, Maswa District, Tanganyika.
- John Mackay Malcolm, Provincial Commissioner, Sierra Leone.
- Baldev Sahai Mohindra. For public services in Kenya.
- Leonard Geoffrey Morgan, deputy director of Education, Hong Kong.
- Major Omer Faik Muftizade, MBE, Commissioner, Paphos, Cyprus.
- Kenneth Crosthwaite Murray, Surveyor of Antiquities, Federation of Nigeria.
- Adam Noble. For public services in the Eastern Region, Nigeria.
- Derek Antony Gordon Reeve, Senior District Commissioner, Nyasaland.
- The Venerable Archdeacon Harry Vivian Collett Reynolds, Archdeacon of the Solomons and Vicar-General of the Diocese, Western Pacific.
- Dhun Jehangir Ruttonjee, JP. For public services in Hong Kong.
- Mallam Muhammadu Sambo. For public services in the Northern Region, Nigeria.
- Lauraeston Sharp, Senior Assistant Commissioner, Uganda Police Force.
- Robert Stewart Slessor, MB, ChB, Senior Medical Officer, Falkland Islands.
- Major Ian Edmund Snell, MBE, Assistant Adviser, Eastern Aden Protectorate.
- Edward Charles Sowe, MBE, Postmaster General, Gambia.
- Donald Stephens, Director of Intelligence, Cyprus.
- Arthur Wesley Sugunaratnam Thevathasan, MRCP. For public services in Singapore.
- George Worthington Thom, Administrative Officer, Eastern Region, Nigeria.
- Thomas Charles Whitbread Tippin, Senior Marine Engineer, East African Railways & Harbours Administration.
- Joseph Vassallo, Director of Education, Malta.
- Harold George Ward, Deputy Representative, Overseas Territories Income Tax Office.
- Edward John Hugo Colchester-Wemyss, Commissioner, Bahamas Police Force.
- Edward Williams, deputy director of Agriculture, Nyasaland.

Honorary Officers

- Yeoh Cheang Kang, JP. For public services in Perak, Federation of Malaya.
- Abdul Rahman Mohamed Abu Bakar. For public services in Penang, Federation of Malaya.
- Ameri Tajo. For public services in Zanzibar.

==== Member of the Order of the British Empire (MBE) ====
Military Division

Royal Navy

- Lieutenant-Commander Sidney William Alfred Charlton, BEM, RNVR.
- Lieutenant-Commander Richard George Ralph Clay.
- Engineer Lieutenant-Commander Sydney William Dobinson, (Retd).
- First Officer Margaret Louise Doughty, Women's Royal Naval Service.
- Supply Lieutenant Kenneth Leonard Finch, BEM, (Retd).
- Lieutenant-Commander (SP) James Hunter, RNVR.
- Lieutenant-Commander Lionel Jackson, (Retd).
- Major Thomas Melvin Lenham, Royal Marines.
- Engineer Lieutenant-Commander Charles Leonard Martin.
- Recruiting Officer Alfred Henry Edward Watkins.
- Lieutenant-Commander (SD) Alfred Henry West.
- Lieutenant-Commander Robert Andrew Williams.
- Lieutenant (SD) George Alan Morley Wookey.

Additional Members

In recognition of distinguished services in the Operations in the Near East, October–December 1956.

- Lieutenant-Commander George Hill Creese, HMS Eagle.
- Lieutenant-Commander John Homersham Golds, HMS Newfoundland.
- Lieutenant-Commander John Morris Jones, 895 Royal Naval Air Squadron.
- Lieutenant John Arthur Charles Morgan, 845 Royal Naval Air Squadron.
- Lieutenant-Commander Eric Norman Read, HMS Kingarth
- Lieutenant-Commander Deryck Arthur James Sheppard, 810 Royal Naval Air Squadron.
- Lieutenant-Commander Alan Montagu Burleigh Taylor, HMS Eagle.

Army

- Captain Wellington Umo Bassey (WA/1), The Royal West African Frontier Force.
- Major James Willcox Berridge (86005), Irish Guards.
- 22557866 Warrant Officer Class II Lawrence Bowles, The King's Own Yorkshire Light Infantry, Territorial Army.
- Major (temporary) Jack Broadbent (345215), Royal Army Ordnance Corps.
- Major (Director of Music) Basil Hector Brown, ARCM (388004), Royal Regiment of Artillery.
- Major Thomas Hadden Caldwell, TD (384611), Corps of Royal Engineers, Territorial Army.
- Major Sidney George Chissim (307697), Royal Armoured Corps.
- Major (temporary) Peter Hollis Clayton (397206), The Queen's Royal Regiment (West Surrey).
- S/57239 Warrant Officer Class I Reginald Stanley Cole, Royal Army Service Corps.
- S/782249 Warrant Officer Class I Laurence Charles Collins, Royal Army Service Corps.
- Captain George William Cox (414005), Royal Army Dental Corps.
- Major Thomas Stevenson Craig, MC (85709), Royal Tank Regiment, Royal Armoured Corps.
- 2976865 Warrant Officer Class II Samuel Montgomery Crumlish, MM, Royal Regiment of Artillery, Territorial Army.
- Major Robert James Patrick Cummins (174748), The Middlesex Regiment (Duke of Cambridge's Own), Territorial Army.
- Lieutenant Welby Arthur James Davey, TD (67721), Royal Army Medical Corps, Territorial Army.
- Captain (Quartermaster) John Arthur Davies, TD (291101), Royal Army Medical Corps, Territorial Army.
- 2615076 Warrant Officer Class I Alfred Dickinson, Grenadier Guards.
- 21021029 Warrant Officer Class I Martin Dillon, Royal Pioneer Corps.
- Major Sidney Ernest Dutton (355689), Royal Army Ordnance Corps.
- Major (Quartermaster) Henry Edwards (113927), The King's Royal Rifle Corps.
- Major (acting) John Robert Fisher (69568), Combined Cadet Force.
- Captain Ernest Floweth (327380), Corps of Royal Military Police.
- Captain (acting) Thomas Forbes, TD (221725), Combined Cadet Force.
- 1103322 Warrant Officer Class II Alexander Cecil Green, The Parachute Regiment Glider Pilot & Parachute Corps.
- S/14298191 Warrant Officer Class II William Terence Griffiths, Royal Army Service Corps.
- Captain Edwin Xavier Halliday (337218), Corps of Royal Engineers.
- Major Ernest Harold Hancock (265484), Royal Army Ordnance Corps.
- The Reverend John Francis Wrangham Hardy, TD, Chaplain to the Forces, Third Class (86757), Royal Army Chaplains' Department, Territorial Army.
- Major Diana Mia Hewitt (196042), late Women's Royal Army Corps.
- 21001474 Warrant Officer Class II George Arthur Jelley, The Inns of Court Regiment, Royal Armoured Corps, Territorial Army.
- Captain (Quartermaster) Hugh McCarter Joel, MM (422096), Coldstream Guards.
- Major Cecil Francis Kirby, TD (33040), Royal Corps of Signals, Army Emergency Reserve (For services with the Combined Cadet Force).
- Major (Quartermaster) Edward Horace Lane (246478), Corps of Royal Engineers.
- Major (acting) Frederick Lionel Le Franc (374607), Army Cadet Force.
- 7883872 Warrant Officer Class I Owen Arthur Lester, Royal Tank Regiment, Royal Armoured Corps.
- 22221006 Warrant Officer Class II Reginald Vaughan Marriott, Honourable Artillery Company (Infantry), Territorial Army..
- 4913359 Warrant Officer Class I Charles Edward Marshall, The North Staffordshire Regiment (The Prince of Wales's).
- Major William Edwin Martin (67781), Royal Regiment of Artillery.
- Major Leslie Mellor (210077), Royal Army Service Corps, Territorial Army.
- Major (temporary) Edward Henry Merry (302643), Corps of Royal Engineers.
- Captain Frederick William Levin Miller (177373), Royal Regiment of Artillery (Employed List).
- 22243844 Warrant Officer Class I (Bandmaster) Thomas George Morgan, The Monmouthshire Regiment, Territorial Army.
- 21015682 Warrant Officer Class II John Michael Murphy, The Parachute Regiment, Glider Pilot & Parachute Corps, Territorial Army.
- Captain (Quartermaster) Reginald Neal (414198), The Royal Warwickshire Regiment.
- Major (temporary) Raymond Clephn Werner Nightingale (KR.5713), The Kenya Regiment, Territorial Force.
- T/61102 Warrant Officer Class I Arthur Saward Ogden, Royal Army Service Corps.
- ER/6001435 Warrant Officer Class II Bertie Oliver, The Argyll & Sutherland Highlanders (Princess Louise's).
- Major (temporary) John Herbert George Parfect (271777), Corps of Royal Engineers.
- Major Charles Parmee (378411), Corps of Royal Electrical & Mechanical Engineers, Army Emergency Reserve.
- Major Peter Alec Paxton (205942), Corps of Royal Engineers.
- 5763457 Warrant Officer Class II John Herbert Pearce, The Royal Norfolk Regiment, Territorial Army.
- Major (Quartermaster) Alec Dennis Pelling (221173), 8th King's Royal Irish Hussars, Royal Armoured Corps.
- Captain Victor Hamilton Philip (427504), Corps of Royal Electrical & Mechanical Engineers.
- Captain Ernest George James Pott (420507), General List.
- 879859 Warrant Officer Class II Charles Thomas Preston, Royal Regiment of Artillery.
- Major Henry Lally Tolendal Radice (180619), The Gloucestershire Regiment.
- Major (Quartermaster) George Merson Reid (113040), Royal Regiment of Artillery.
- Major Robert Donald Alexander Renton, MC (87095), 17th/21st Lancers, Royal Armoured Corps.
- Major Charles Abiathan Rice (181970), The South Wales Borderers (Employed List).
- Captain (acting) William Thomas Richards (351373), Army Cadet Force.
- Captain Harry Rothwell (373641), Royal Corps of Signals.
- Captain (Quartermaster) Charles Norman Russell (407672), Royal Army Service Corps.
- 14889886 Warrant Officer Class II Grenville Savage, The Parachute Regiment, Glider Pilot & Parachute Corps.
- Captain Richard John Shackleton (360424), Royal Tank Regiment, Royal Armoured Corps.
- Major Denis Story Sole (73140), The Border Regiment.
- Major (Quartermaster) Joseph William Storey (107087), Royal Army Service Corps.
- 2324422 Warrant Officer Class I Cecil Armstrong Thompson, Royal Corps of Signals.
- Major Richard James Andrew Watt (73092), Welsh Guards.
- Major (Quartermaster) Edward Henry Ford Watts (244322), The Buffs (Royal East Kent Regiment).
- 5381454 Warrant Officer Class II Robert Wigg, Intelligence Corps.
- Major Hugh Rowan Marett Wilkin (64581), The Royal Northumberland Fusiliers.
- 6134739 Warrant Officer Class II Hector Lisle Stuart-William, The East Surrey Regiment, Territorial Army.
- 4184388 Warrant Officer Class II John David Williams, The Royal Welch Fusiliers, Territorial Army.
- Major and Paymaster Walter Basil Wilton, MC (182431), Royal Army Pay Corps.
- Major (temporary) Dudley Lancefield Wolstenholme (165197), Royal Army Ordnance Corps (now retired).

Additional Members

In recognition of distinguished services in the Operations in the Near East, October–December 1956.

- Major Kenneth D'Alby (132343), Corps of Royal Engineers.
- Major Charles Whish Dunbar (121519), The Highland Light Infantry (City of Glasgow Regiment).
- Major Thomas Henry Giffard Fletcher (95199), Royal Corps of Signals. Now RARO.
- Major (Acting Lieutenant-Colonel) Harry Kline, MC (321001), Corps of Royal Engineers.
- Major Henry Andrew Thomas Rosser, ERD (219722), Corps of Royal Engineers.
- Major Michael Guy Stevens (166461), Corps of Royal Engineers.
- Major Stephen MacPhail Yeoman (233089), Royal Regiment of Artillery.
- Major (Temporary) Lionel Alexander Digby Harrod (320943), Grenadier Guards.
- Captain (Temporary Major) Hugh William Longbourne Browne (303370), Corps of Royal Engineers.
- 22819000 Warrant Officer Class II Edward Daniel George Cavanagh, Corps of Royal Engineers.

Honorary Members

- Lieutenant Foo Gee Teng, Platoon Commander, Kulai New Village Home Guard, Federation of Malaya.
- Honorary Captain Sivagnanam Rajaratnam, Home Guard Inspector, Negri Sembilan, Federation of Malaya.
- Warrant Officer Class II Loh Chee Mee, Patrol Commander, Kinta Valley Home Guard, Federation of Malaya.

Royal Air Force

- Squadron Leader Edwin Harold Burgess, DFC (159449).
- Squadron Leader Valentine Harold Hemming (140930).
- Squadron Leader Arthur Leslie Fairhurst Lloyd (57771).
- Squadron Leader Irwyn Morse Perkins, MRCS, LRCP (202773).
- Squadron Leader Merlyn Williams (49695).
- Acting Squadron Leader Gilbert William Goodwin (59088).
- Acting Squadron Leader Roland Humphrey (503310).
- Acting Squadron Leader Roy Massey Hutson (504353).
- Flight Lieutenant Adrian Frederick Clement Colthurst Adcock (502474).
- Flight Lieutenant Albert Edward Beard (501103).
- Flight Lieutenant Anthony Burdess (51787).
- Flight Lieutenant Francis Bolam Cowen, MC, TD (149992), Royal Auxiliary Air Force Regiment.
- Flight Lieutenant David James Cutts (50224).
- Flight Lieutenant Peter William Gee (700746).
- Flight Lieutenant Brian Geoffrey Greenbank (45450).
- Flight Lieutenant Osmond Roy Griffiths (591553).
- Flight Lieutenant Roy Hedger (58878).
- Flight Lieutenant Stanley Jackson (179342).
- Flight Lieutenant William Keith MacTaggart (3117688).
- Flight Lieutenant Arthur Mail (142094), Royal Auxiliary Air Force.
- Flight Lieutenant Robert John McGurk Melvin (132454), Royal Auxiliary Air Force.
- Flight Lieutenant Harry Patterson (501097), (Retd).
- Flight Lieutenant Harry Russell (508015).
- Flight Lieutenant George Alan Stalker (1820115).
- Flight Officer Barbara Constance Stannard (2170006), Women's Royal Air Force.
- Flight Lieutenant Robert Beresford Walker (200582).
- Flight Lieutenant John Samuel McCulloch Wallace (163201).
- Flight Lieutenant Stanley Thomas Frederick Webb (166107).
- Yuzbashi Mohamed Said Yafai (3482), Aden Protectorate Levies.
- Acting Flight Lieutenant Joseph Francis Duffin (65237), Royal Air Force Volunteer Reserve (Training Branch).
- Acting Flight Lieutenant Dudley Charles Palmer (189023), Royal Air Force Volunteer Reserve (Training Branch).
- Flying Officer Billy Yarnall, BEM (568608).
- Warrant Officer George Barron (590990).
- Warrant Officer Roland Bourton (513012).
- Warrant Officer Jack Copus (564560).
- Warrant Officer George Kyffyn Done (572019).
- Warrant Officer Albert Rees Evans (565322).
- Warrant Officer Frederick William Humberstone (235655).
- Warrant Officer Sydney Victor Hunt (510689).
- Warrant Officer Meurig Jones (590978).
- Warrant Officer Bernard Lockwood (562848).
- Warrant Officer Frank William Heman Parsons (561205).
- Warrant Officer Percival Gloyn Tall (365814).
- Warrant Officer Frank Ward (511719).
- Acting Warrant Officer Louis Percy Marfleet (552482).

Additional Members

In recognition of distinguished services in the Operations in the Near East, October–December 1956.

- Squadron Leader Peter George Coulson, AFC (55836).
- Squadron Leader Albert Hudson Streeter (50422).
- Squadron Leader David Rutherford Ware, DFC, AFC (169023).
- Acting Squadron Leader Arthur Vaughan Henshaw (172788).
- Flight Lieutenant Douglas Bourke (518586).
- Flight Lieutenant Stanley Albert Waring (137084).
- Flying Officer John-White Fraser (1822429).

Civil Division

- Margaret Allan, Honorary Secretary, Stonehaven (Kincardine) Savings Group.
- Doris Nellie Allen, Executive Officer, Office of the Crown Estate Commissioners, (now Executive Officer, National Assistance Board).
- Sidney Allman, Area Chief Mechanical Engineer, West Midlands Division, National Coal Board.
- Evelyn Richardson Anderson, Honorary Secretary, Glasgow Tree Lovers' Society.
- Ruby Lilian Anderson, JP, Centre Organiser, Luton, Women's Voluntary Services.
- Harold Bradley Andrews, Assistant Regional Manager, Eastern Region, War Damage Commission & Central Land Board.
- John William Ansell, Chief Clerk, Telephone Manager's Office, Leeds, General Post Office.
- Thomas Henry Arnold, Deputy Controller of Research, Hadfields Ltd.
- Walter Provan Arrol, Grade 3 Officer, Ministry of Labour & National Service.
- Alec William Astling, Higher Executive Officer, Ministry of Transport & Civil Aviation.
- Raymond John Ayers, Assistant County Surveyor, Devon County Council.
- Arthur Hedley Bantham, Light Spring Shop Manager, John Spencer & Sons (1928) Ltd., Newburn, Northumberland.
- William Wilfrid Barber. For political services in Pontefract.
- Henry Charles Barham, Executive Officer, War Office.
- Lewis James Barrell, Honorary Secretary, Colchester Savings Committee.
- Alderman Thomas Henry Bate, chairman, Chester District Committee, Cheshire Agricultural Executive Committee.
- Arthur Hurle Bathard, Experimental Officer, Rodent Research Branch, Ministry of Agriculture, Fisheries & Food.
- Alderman Thomas Battersby, JP, National Officer (Retail Meat Trade and Slaughterhouse Industry), Union of Shop, Distributive & Allied Workers.
- Philip Edwin Bayley, Second Clerk, Judicial Committee of the Privy Council.
- George Reginald Bean, lately Chief Clerk, York District Probate Registry, Supreme Court of Judicature.
- Bernard Thomas Beaumont, Area Commissioner and County Secretary, Kent, St. John Ambulance Brigade.
- Frederick Henry Bennett, Higher Executive Officer, Commonwealth Relations Office.
- Arthur Howard Bevan, Telecommunications Traffic Superintendent, Cardiff, General Post Office.
- Elsie Bickley, Headmistress, Sherwood County Primary School, Warsop, Nottinghamshire.
- Frederic Arthur Bird, Senior Executive Officer, Ministry of Housing & Local Government.
- Sidney Black, Coal and Products Officer, Northern Gas Board.
- Alfred Blamire, chairman, Newton-le Willows-Unit, Sea Cadet Corps, Lancashire.
- Doris May Blanks, Clerical Officer, Ministry of Defence.
- Agnes Leila Mildred Boden, Division Commissioner, Nottingham (Forest), Girl Guides Association.
- Basil Frederick Boothby, Head of Export Assistance Department, National Union of Manufacturers.
- Archibald Whitelaw Boyd, Senior Executive Officer, Department of Health for Scotland.
- Albert Arthur Brake, Assistant Secretary, Aldershot & District Traction Co.
- Ida Brandon, Assistant to the Honorary Secretary, Northern Ireland District, Soldiers', Sailors' & Airmen's Families Association.
- William Henry Brickwood, chairman, Loughborough District Committee, Leicestershire Agricultural Executive Committee.
- Charles Henry Briggs, Mechanical & Electrical Engineer, No.13 Works Area Headquarters, Air Ministry.
- Lady Barbara Ruggles-Brise, Senior Social Worker, HM Prison Wormwood Scrubs.
- Hermione Joyce Cecilia Bromwich, Warden, Dockland Settlement No.4, London.
- Ernest Alfred Brooks, Higher Executive Officer, Government Communications Headquarters.
- Harold Denovan Bruce, Head of Electronics Application Department, W. H. Smith & Co. Ltd., Electrical Engineers.
- Charles Arthur Bryer, Grade 3 Officer, Ministry of Labour & National Service.
- Eric William Budden, Honorary Secretary, St. Thomas Secondary School Savings Group, Salisbury.
- Henry Burch, JP, chairman, Eastry District Committee, Kent Agricultural Executive Committee.
- Robert Evan Burns. For political services in County Londonderry.
- Ella Maud Burrows, Senior Executive Officer, Ministry of Pensions & National Insurance.
- Edmund Alfred Bushell, chairman, Dover Local Employment Committee.
- William Harold Butler, Head Postmaster, Ely, Cambridgeshire.
- Reginald James Brooks Butt, Higher Executive Officer, Air Ministry.
- Annie Caley, Senior Ward Sister, the Pastures Hospital, Mickleover, Derby.
- Jack Alexander Calvesbert, Executive Officer, Board of Trade.
- Daniel Carmichael, National Secretary, Merchant Navy & Air Line Officers' Association.
- John Alexander Carss. For political services.
- Gertrude Carter, lately District Midwife, Hertfordshire County Council.
- Kenneth Charles Graham Chambers. For services to the British Legion.
- Mary Chambers, Headmistress, North Cadbury Church of England School, Somerset.
- George Alexander Chapman, Chief Papermaker, Alexander Cowan & Sons Ltd.
- Wilfred Baker Claridge, Divisional Engineer and Manager, Swindon Division, South Western Gas Board.
- Ernest Harcourt Coleman, Senior Experimental Officer, Fire Research Station, Department of Scientific & Industrial Research.
- Ethel May Coles. For political and public services in Buckinghamshire.
- Catherine Elisabeth Cooke, Senior Woman Physical Education Organiser, Bristol Local Education Authority.
- William Coop, Chief Warden, Civil Defence Corps, Salford.
- George Ellis Cooper, Senior Assistant, Harriseahead County Primary School, Stoke-on-Trent, Staffordshire.
- James Robinson Corrin, JP, lately Member, Legislative Council, Isle of Man.
- William Arthur Coslett, BEM, Manager, Cable & Wireless (West Indies) Ltd., Jamaica.
- Edward James Cotterell, Production Superintendent, Wellington Tube Works, Great Bridge, Staffordshire.
- Sydney Herbert Counter, Senior Executive Officer, Board of Trade.
- Winifred May Cox, Training Officer, Emergency Bed Service for London.
- Frederick William Coxhead, Higher Executive Officer, Ministry of Pensions & National Insurance.
- Winifred Margaret Cragg Turner, Senior Auditor, Exchequer & Audit Department.
- Frederick Dean Cresswell, Revenue Accountant, British European Airways Corporation.
- John Curtis, Assistant Honorary Clerk, General Purposes Sub-Committee, Metropolitan Boroughs Standing Joint Committee.
- William Wallace Burnyeat Dalzell, District Commissioner, Whitehaven District, Cumberland, Boy Scouts Association.
- Winifred Monica Dance, Secretary, Society for the Protection of Ancient Buildings.
- Hector Frederic Townsend Davey, JP, chairman, Whitstable Savings Committee, Kent.
- Frederick Davidson, Manager, Government Contracts Department, Revo Electric Co. Ltd., Tipton, Staffordshire.
- Gilbert Marr Davies, Manager, Mode Wheel (Trafford Park) Terminal, Manchester, Esso Petroleum Co. Ltd.
- William Edwin Davis, Chief Superintendent, Metropolitan Police Force.
- Frank Dalmeny Dawtry, Secretary, National Association of Probation Officers.
- Leslie Day, Inspector of Taxes, Board of Inland Revenue.
- Emile Alexander Paul De Waele, Chairman of Committee, No.16 F (Wood Green & Hornsey) Squadron, Air Training Corps.
- John James Duffy, JP, General Secretary, Union of Jute, Flax & Kindred Textile Operatives, Dundee.
- Ethel Clara Duke, lately Headmistress, Hartley House School for the Deaf.
- Peter Ferguson Dunbar, Scottish Executive, British Broadcasting Corporation.
- John Alan Dunkley, Development Engineer and Designer-in-Charge, R. B. Pullin & Co. Ltd., Brentford, Middlesex.
- Arthur Douglas Durbin, General Secretary, Federation of British Manufacturers of Sports & Games Ltd.
- Sydney Charles Elliott, Customs Officer, Board of Customs & Excise.
- William Arthur Ellis. For political and public services in Stockton-on-Tees.
- Douglas William Emmott, Regional Secretary (Yorkshire), National Federation of Building Trades Operatives.
- Harry Evans, Divisional Mental Welfare Officer, West Central Division, Middlesex County Council.
- Colonel Henry Conrad Tindal Faithfull, Retired Officer, Grade II, War Office.
- Albert Ferguson, Assistant Engineer, Belfast Corporation Transport Department.
- Annie Elizabeth Fisher, Clerical Officer, Commonwealth Relations Office.
- Gerald Bernard Fisher, Executive Officer, Board of Trade.
- Dorys Murita Fletcher. For political and public services in Kent.
- Nancy Howard Fletcher, County Organiser, Glamorgan, Women's Voluntary Services.
- William Nicholas Fox, Chief Draughtsman, Engineering Department, HM Dockyard, Rosyth.
- Arnold Gordon Francis, Waterguard Surveyor, Board of Customs & Excise.
- Edwin Franks, MC, Deputy County Commissioner, North Riding, Boy Scouts Association.
- George French, Higher Executive Officer, Ministry of Agriculture, Fisheries & Food.
- Pamela Winifred Freston, Information Officer, Central Office of Information.
- Frederick Robert Edward Clark Gale, Senior Museum Assistant, Science Museum.
- George Michael Gapp, Grade B3 Officer, Government Communications Headquarters.
- Evelyn Rosanna Garnett, JP. For political and public services in Lancashire.
- Norman Garside. For political services in Coventry.
- James Henry Gazzard, Accountant, Headquarters, Navy, Army & Air Force Institutes.
- Phyllis Eleanor Angela Gelli. For political services.
- Arthur Ernest Gettens, Senior Executive Officer, Public Trustee Office.
- James Gilbert, Honorary General Secretary, Scottish Amateur Athletic Association.
- Herbert Laurence Gilder, Accountant, Royal Military Academy Sandhurst.
- Harold Cecil Francis Gill, Senior Accountant, Ministry of Power.
- George Walter Gillam, Senior Executive Officer, War Office.
- George Glover. For political and public services in Northumberland.
- Norman Wilfoy Goodall, Grade 3 Officer, Ministry of Labour & National Service.
- Frederic Causley Goodger, Accountant, Colonial Development Corporation.
- Cyril Charles Goodhind, Administrative Secretary, Imperial Headquarters, Boy Scouts Association.
- Marie Louise Goodway, Higher Executive Officer, Ministry of Transport & Civil Aviation.
- Stanley Mark Gray, Executive Officer, Ministry of Pensions & National Insurance.
- Horace Edward Green, Senior Executive Officer, Ministry of Supply.
- William Jesse Green, Clerk of the Works, York Minster.
- Walter Stanley Gregory, Slaughterhouse Superintendent, Guildford Corporation Abattoir.
- William Glyn Griffith. For political and public services in North Wales.
- Margaret Macpherson Guthrie, JP. For political services in Kinross and Perthshire.
- Kathleen Mary Haddock, HM District Inspector of Factories, Ministry of Labour & National Service.
- Ernest Frederick Hall, Assistant Chief Constable, Surrey Constabulary.
- George Hallam, Group Scoutmaster, 8th Stoke-on-Trent Group, Staffordshire, Boy Scouts Association.
- Mary Jane Halsey. For services as Manageress, "The Connaught" Sailors', Soldiers' & Airmen's Home, Malta.
- Eric Halson, Chief Examiner of Paper and Office Requisites, HM Stationery Office.
- Wilfred Richard Hammond, School Purser and Chief Clerk, National Sea Training School, Sharpness.
- Alderman John Handley, JP, chairman, South District Committee, Westmorland Agricultural Executive Committee.
- David Hanna, Principal, Enniskillen Technical Education Area, County Fermanagh.
- Rotchford Charles Hanner. For political services in Woolwich.
- Tom Oliver Harper, JP, Member, Newcastle-under-Lyme Borough Council.
- Elizabeth Gertrude Harrison. For political services in Northampton.
- Observer Lieutenant Robert Charles Harrod, Area Training Officer, Eastern Area, Royal Observer Corps.
- Harold William Hart, Senior Executive Officer, National Assistance Board.
- Henrietta Hawkins, JP. For political and public services in Hampshire.
- Arthur Edmund Hayne. For political and public services in Surrey.
- John Frederick Head. For services to Archaeology in Buckinghamshire.
- Cyril Michael Heathcote, chairman, Mansfield, Retford & District War Pensions Committee.
- Agnes Heaton. For political and public services in the Spen Valley.
- Kate Henderson, Welfare Supervisor (Women), North Eastern Region, British Railways.
- Francis Merchant Hermon, Senior Executive Officer, Ministry of Defence.
- Kathleen May Hill, Woman Police Staff Officer, Home Office and Scottish Home Department.
- Olive Lois Hillbrook, Land Ranger Adviser for England, Girl Guides Association,
- Isabelle Marian Hilliers, Staff Officer-in-Charge, Invalid Travel Section. British Red Cross Society.
- Walter Hinchcliffe, Higher Executive Officer, Ministry of Pensions & National Insurance.
- Charles Stephen Hindwood, Senior Executive Officer, Paymaster General's Office.
- John Heath Hoare, Assistant Engineer, General Post Office.
- Joan Margaret Hoban, Administrative Assistant, Transcription Service, British Broadcasting Corporation.
- Eleanor Hollinshead, Scottish. Headquarters Officer, Women's Voluntary Services.
- Richard John William Hollis, Senior Executive Officer, Ministry of Pensions & National Insurance.
- Patrick Stephen Horrigan, Clerical Officer, Ministry of Agriculture, Fisheries & Food.
- Alexis Francis Houlberg, chairman, Society of Model Aeronautical Engineers.
- Henry Houston, Commissioner, North Western. Region, National Savings Committee.
- Jane Henderson McNeill Houston, JP, chairman, Fife War Pensions Committee.
- James Pryor Howard, Honorary Secretary and Treasurer, National Federation of Far Eastern Prisoners-of-War Clubs & Associations.
- Oliver Stanley Howden, JP, Member, Doncaster Rural District Council.
- Thomas Patrick Howkins, MRCS, LRCP, Divisional Medical Officer, Southern Region, British Railways.
- Robert Howorth, chairman, Bury, Rawtenstall & District War Pensions Committee.
- Charles Humphries, Higher Executive Officer, British Museum.
- Cyril Herbert Donald Hurdle. For political and public services in Salisbury.
- Thomas Richard Ierland. For political and public services in Battersea.
- Sidney Charles Ireland, Editor of Debates, House of Lords.
- Edmund Alexander Jackson, Chief Registrar, Shipping Federation Ltd.
- Kenneth Noel Jacques, Senior Warning Officer, Civil Defence Corps, Derby.
- Thomas George Jellis, Administrative Assistant (Finance), Anzac Agency, Imperial War Graves Commission.
- Doris Johnson, County Borough Organiser, Darlington, Women's Voluntary Services.
- John Walter Joseph Johnson, Regional Collector of Taxes, Board of Inland Revenue.
- Reuben Dexter Jones, Clerk, Llandudno Urban District Council.
- Florence Keegan, Senior Technical Nursing Officer, Ministry of Labour & National Service.
- Alfred Gregory Kerry, Group Scoutmaster, 7th St. Helen's Group, Lancashire, Boy Scouts Association.
- Bessie Margaret Fraser Kingsbury, Executive Officer, Home Office.
- Sidney Joseph George Knight, Senior Executive Officer, Government Communications Headquarters.
- Henry Thomas Knightbridge, lately Senior Executive Officer, Ministry of Supply.
- Thomas Edmund Knowles, County Poultry Advisory Officer for Lancashire, Grade II, Ministry of Agriculture, Fisheries & Food.
- Elsie May Lathlean, Senior Executive Officer, Post Office Savings Department, General Post Office.
- George Lee, Senior Rural Industries Organiser, Yorkshire Rural Community Council.
- William Alexander James Leitch, lately Maintenance Engineer, Dunston & Blaydon Power Stations, North Eastern Division, Central Electricity Authority.
- Albert Leonard, Secretary, Breconshire Local Education Authority.
- Henry Lloyd, Chief Experimental Officer, Metallurgy Division, Atomic Energy Research Establishment, Harwell.
- Basil Gunson Lord, Senior Technical Assistant, Foreign Office.
- Henry Laurence Lynch, Higher Executive Officer, Ministry of Pensions & National Insurance.
- Ronald James McCallum, Senior Telecommunications Superintendent, Scotland, General Post Office.
- Griselda Patricia MacCaul, Head Occupational Therapist, King's College Hospital.
- Christina McDonald, Headmistress, Harmony Row Primary School, Glasgow.
- Daniel Fraser Macdonald, Civil Defence Officer, Glasgow.
- John Macdonald, Relieving Chief Engineer, Ben Line Steamers Ltd.
- Alfred McGregor, Chief Electrician, MV Circassia, Anchor Line Ltd.
- James Alexander Macintyre, Superintendent and Deputy Chief Constable, Inverness-shire Constabulary.
- Alan MacKay, Regional Chief Executive Officer, North Eastern Region, Ministry of Power.
- William James McKee, Member of Council, St. Andrew's Ambulance Association.
- Captain John Cameron MacKinnon, Master, MV Claymore, David MacBrayne Ltd.
- James Charles McLaughlin, lately Deputy Principal Officer, Ministry of Commerce, Northern Ireland.
- George Alexander MacLeod, Executive Officer, Department of Agriculture for Scotland.
- Alexander McNeilly, Clerk, North Down Rural District Council.
- Alexander Turner MacPherson, Senior Assistant Shipyard Manager, Fairfield Shipbuilding & Engineering Co. Ltd., Glasgow.
- Charles Reginald Makepeace, Executive Officer, Foreign Office.
- Richard George Mann, Executive Engineer, External Telecommunications Executive, General Post Office.
- Raymond George Robins Marshall, Honorary Secretary, Cardiff Savings Committee.
- Elsie Marston. For political services in Cheshire.
- Frank Sidney Martin, Executive Officer, Ministry of Agriculture, Fisheries & Food.
- William George Bushell-Matthews. For services to the Theatre. Chairman, Western Area Committee, British Drama League.
- William Meharg, District Inspector, Royal Ulster Constabulary.
- Constance Mary Mercer, lately Organising Secretary, Federation of Women's Institutes of Northern Ireland (Belfast).
- Thomas Herbert Messenger, Head of Library & Intelligence Division, Research Association of British Rubber Manufacturers.
- Alfred Cyril Middleton. For political and public services in Dagenham.
- Isabella Wyllie Milstead, Executive Officer, Ministry of Pensions & National Insurance.
- Ralph Wardle Moore, Senior Technical Superintendent, No.33 Maintenance Unit, Royal Air Force, Lyneham.
- Thomas Morgans, Land Service Assistant, Grade II, Ministry of Agriculture, Fisheries & Food.
- David Milne Morrice, MSM, Master, RFA Kinbrace.
- John Herbert Moss, Inspector of Stamping, Board of Inland Revenue.
- Neville Chilton Mountford, Assistant Chief Officer, Hampshire Fire Brigade.
- Uisdean Fraser Murray, Assistant Chief Commercial Officer (Contracting, Sales and Service, Publicity) South of Scotland Electricity Board.
- Harry Nailer, Clerical Officer, Royal Air Force Flying College, Manby.
- Brian Leigh Nelson, Regional Ground Services Manager, Europe & Africa, British Overseas Airways Corporation.
- Lady Violet Sophia Mary Neville. For political and public services in Norfolk.
- John Newell, Curator of the Garden, John Innes Horticultural Institution.
- Hubert Wilfrid Newill, AFM, Personal Assistant to Joint Managing Director, Blaw-Knox Ltd.
- Albert John Norris, lately Chief Superintendent and Deputy Chief Constable, Northamptonshire Constabulary.
- Norman Nye, Higher Executive Officer, Ministry of Education.
- Stewart Hunter O'Fee, Senior Auditor, Exchequer & Audit Department, Northern Ireland.
- Helen Mary Harms Orme, National Honorary Treasurer, British Legion (Women's Section).
- Robert Owens, Member, Northern Ireland Executive Council, Forces Help Society & Lord Roberts Workshops.
- Isobel Ferguson Palmer, Chief Clerk, Territorial & Auxiliary Forces' Associations, County of the City of Aberdeen & Counties of Aberdeen, Banff & Kincardine.
- Wilfrid Ernest Palmer, Member, South Somerset District Advisory Committee, South Western Regional Board for Industry.
- William Thomas Hele Palmer, lately Clerical Officer, War Office.
- Arthur Allan Parry, Head Forester, Forestry Commission.
- Gilbert Wright Partridge. For political and public services in Staffordshire.
- George Paton, Supervisor of Art, Dunbarton Education Authority.
- Alderman Archibald Patton, JP. For public services in Northumberland.
- Albert Payne, Charge Nurse, Banstead Hospital, Surrey.
- William Richard Payne, lately Clerk of Works, Grade I, Ministry of Works.
- Richard Grigg Paynter, JP, Member, Cornwall County Agricultural Executive Committee.
- Denis Alfred Pearce, Chief Foreman of Works, Civil Engineering Department, HM Dockyard Devonport.
- Charles Pearson, Senior Executive Officer, Board of Trade.
- Robert Reginald Pecorini, Engineering Technical Class, Grade I, Ministry of Supply.
- Joseph Pennington, JP, chairman, Worsley Town Development Joint Management Committee, Lancashire.
- Sheila Marjorie Pocock, General Secretary, Crafts Centre of Great Britain, Hay Hill, London.
- Albert John Porter, Security Officer, Esso Petroleum Co. Ltd., Glasgow.
- Thomas Pratt, Senior Executive Officer, Air Ministry.
- William James Quill, Chief of Systems Design & Planning, Radar Division, Marconi's Wireless Telegraph Co. Ltd.
- Doris Mary Quin, Attached War Office.
- Rebecca Randall. For services to the Blind.
- George Rawlinson, Divisional Sea Transport Officer, Ministry of Transport & Civil Aviation.
- Marjorie Joan Redman, Sub-Editor, The Listener, Publications Department, British Broadcasting Corporation.
- Henry John James Redwood, Chief Draughtsman, Engineer-in-Chiefs Department, Admiralty.
- Herbert Renton, Manager, Building Department, Vickers-Armstrongs (Engineers) Ltd., Barrow-in-Furness.
- Jemima Leven Corral Renwick, Matron, Woodlands Home, Cults, Aberdeenshire.
- Edward Hinbest Richardson. For public services in Birmingham.
- Margaret Cunningham Richmond, Member, Visiting Committee, HM Prison Perth.
- Henry William Felix Rodney Ricketts, deputy director, Middle East Department, British Council.
- Arthur Robinson, Divisional Officer, North Riding of Yorkshire Fire Brigade.
- Harry Robinson, Clerk, Ampthill Rural District Council.
- James Rodger, Headmaster, Kelty Primary School, Fife.
- Herbert Frank Rofe, Temporary Assistant, Suffolk Flax Establishment, Board of Trade.
- Ronald Charles Rose, Director, Historic Buildings Bureau, Ministry of Works.
- Donald George Ross, Inspector of Taxes, Board of Inland Revenue.
- Captain Charles Nelson Meredith Rountree, Honorary. Secretary, County Tyrone Savings Committee.
- Stanley Haines Rowell, Honorary Treasurer, Civil Service Sports Council.
- Hermann Rusby, Design Engineer, Metropolitan-Vickers Electrical Co. Ltd., Sheffield.
- Edna May Rutland, First Assistant Secretary, Royal Institution of Chartered Surveyors.
- Harold Ryder, Chief Officer, Stockport Fire Brigade.
- John Brundrit Sankey, Engineer II, Fighting Vehicles Research & Development Establishment, Ministry of Supply.
- John Howard Satterthwaite, JP, Alderman, Clitheroe Borough Council.
- Irene Edith Philippa Savery, Voluntary Worker, Sandes Home, Royal Air Force, Mildenhall.
- Kenneth Scott, Outside Manager, Hawthorn Leslie (Engineers) Ltd., Newcastle upon Tyne.
- Thomas William Scoular, Higher Executive Officer, Board of Customs & Excise.
- Edward William Charles Seward, MM, Higher Executive Officer, General Register Office.
- Ernest Shaw, Higher Executive Officer, Ministry of Pensions & National Insurance.
- Reginald Cairns Shaw, Secretary, Cyclists' Touring Club.
- Charles Percival Bassil Shippam, JP. For services to Boys' Clubs in Sussex.
- Ronald Percy Sillence, Surveyor, Grade I, Ordnance Survey Office, Southampton.
- Frederick Simpson, Under-Manager, Wheatley Hill Colliery, Durham Division, National Coal Board.
- Albert John Smith, Chief of Production Control, Commercial Engineering Factory, EMI Electronics Ltd., Hayes, Middlesex.
- James William Smith, Chief Superintendent and Deputy Chief Constable, Preston Borough Police Force.
- William Richard Smith, Chairman of Committee, No.152 (City of Hull) Squadron, Air Training Corps.
- Robert Hill Spires, lately Senior Experimental Officer, British Museum (Natural History).
- Albert Isaac Spooner. For political and public services in West Ham.
- Martha Atkinson Stevenson, JP, chairman, South Tyrone Hospital Management Committee.
- Dudley Goodridge Stone, lately Deputy Principal Officer, Ministry of Home Affairs, Northern Ireland.
- Vera Stoves, Senior Nursing Sister, Royal Aircraft Establishment, Farnborough, Ministry of Supply.
- Commander Albert John Stowe, RNR, Cargo Superintendent, Furness Withy & Co. Ltd.
- John Richardson Stuart, Civil Engineer (Main Grade), Nicosia, War Office.
- Alice Sutcliffe, Headmistress, Tullyallan Open-Air School, Darwen, Lancashire.
- Ethel Symonds, JP. For political and public services in Norfolk.
- Robert Tankard, Superintendent and Deputy Chief Constable, Birkenhead Borough Police Force.
- Stanley Steventon Tatem. For political and public services in Wolverhampton.
- Edward Alexis Gilbert Taylor, Grade 3 Officer, Branch B of the Foreign Service, Foreign Office.
- James Raitt Taylor, Higher Executive Officer, Ministry of Housing & Local Government.
- Harold John Perdue Teague, MC, Honorary Secretary, Truro & District Savings Committee.
- Isabella Thain, Senior Clerkess, Aberdeen Royal Infirmary.
- Geoffrey Thomas, Senior Captain, Transair Ltd.
- William Thomas, District Officer, HM Coastguard, Holyhead, Anglesey.
- James Thomson, Headmaster, Woodlands County Primary School, Harrogate, Yorkshire.
- Kenneth Wilson Thorndyke, Civil Defence Officer, Boots Pure Drug Co. Ltd., Nottingham.
- Julia Todd, Superintendent Nursing Officer, Radnorshire County Council.
- Alice Margaret Todhunter, Higher Executive Officer, Ministry of Transport & Civil Aviation.
- Donald James Tomlinson, Grade4 Officer, Ministry of Labour & National Service.
- Leonard Richard Tout, Naval Architect, Thorneycroft (Hampton) Boatyard Ltd., Hampton-on-Thames.
- Frank Willie Townsend, Experimental Manufacturing Manager, Plessey Co. Ltd., Ilford, Essex.
- Frederick Henry Travers, Higher Executive Officer. No.72 Maintenance Unit, Air Ministry (now Higher Executive Officer, No.10 Maintenance Unit, Air Ministry).
- Leslie Alfred John Treby, MVO, BEM, Chief Clerk and Accountant, Household of HRH The Prince Philip, Duke of Edinburgh.
- Frederick Archibald Tree, chairman, Enfield Savings Committee.
- George Healey Trend, DSC, Boom Defence and Salvage Officer, Grade II, Admiralty.
- Ida Emily Tripp. For services to the Commonwealth Parliamentary Association.
- Arthur David Troup, Clerk, Visiting Committee, HM Prison Peterhead.
- Thomas Tunstall, Development Engineer on Production, Rockware Glass Ltd., Doncaster.
- Angus Turnbull. For political and public services in County Durham.
- Archibald Ritchie Turnbull, Chief Radio Officer, FF Southern Harvester, Chr. Salvesen & Co.
- James Henry Turner, District Organiser, Birmingham Area, Transport & General Workers' Union (Building Group).
- Gilbert George Lee Tyte, Senior Structural Engineer, Ministry of Works.
- Robert Clarence Vaughan, Higher Executive Officer, Ministry of Health.
- Kenneth Roy Vernon. For political and public services in Ashton-under-Lyne.
- Alderman Wilfrid Ewart Vince, JP, chairman, Trowbridge, Chippenham & District Local Employment Committee.
- Sidney Wade, chairman, Dewsbury, Batley, Wakefield & Mirfield District Advisory Committee, East & West Ridings Regional Board for Industry.
- Charles William Wagner, Higher Executive Officer, Board of Trade.
- Herbert William Wake, Director & Secretary, Northern Counties Federation of Building Trades Employers.
- Bernard Cason Wallace. For political and public services in Yorkshire.
- John Wallace, Chief Clerk, Territorial and Auxiliary Forces Association, County of Durham.
- Dorothy Ethel Wallis, lately Sister, Bristol Homoeopathic Hospital.
- Percy Wallis, Engineer II, Royal Ordnance Factory, Barnbow, Ministry of Supply.
- Cyril Tennant Walters, Inspector of Taxes (Higher Grade), Board of Inland Revenue.
- Andrew McKie Ward, Secretary, Scottish Engineering Employers' Association.
- Archibald Howitt Warren, Assistant Chief Officer, Cheshire Fire Brigade.
- John Hind Warwick, Superintendent of Gardens, West of Scotland Agricultural College, Auchincruive.
- Major Frederick Waspe, Secretary, Old Comrades Association, The Queen's Royal Regiment.
- Gertrude Evelyn Watt, Executive Officer, Foreign Office.
- Gaye Waiters. For public services in Belfast.
- Ernest George Webber, Higher Executive Officer, Ministry of Transport & Civil Aviation.
- Harold Victor Webster, Lately Senior Executive Officer, Headquarters, No.41 Group, Royal Air Force, Andover.
- Hubert Annesley Kemp-Welch, MC, Lately Chairman, Lyndhurst District Committee, Hampshire Agricultural Executive Committee.
- Captain Francis Warr Wethey, Master, SS Cormorant, General Steam Navigation Co. Ltd.
- Robert Whatling, Docks Manager, Garston Docks, British Transport Commission.
- Captain Walter George White, Assistant County Commissioner (Relationships), Surrey, Boy Scouts Association.
- Walter Victor Cecil White, Senior Executive Officer, Colonial Office.
- John Gordon Wickham, Lately Secretary to the Captain-in-Charge, HM Dockyard Simonstown.
- Brigadier George Giffard Rawson Williams, Civil Defence Officer, Mather & Platt Ltd. Manchester
- Mabel Ellen Williams, JP. For political and public services in Cardiff.
- Eric Wilson, Senior Experimental Officer, Scottish Home Department.
- Ernest Albert Wilson, Senior Clerk, Hertford District, Eastern Electricity Board.
- Ronald George Winton, Director & Technical Manager, Lansing Bagnall Ltd., Basingstoke.
- Charles Withers, DCM, Departmental Clerk, South Staffordshire Regimental Depot, War Office.
- Margery Withers, Publicity Officer, European Service, British Broadcasting Corporation.
- William James Wood, Skipper, Steam Trawler Northern Jewel.
- Edith Agnes Woodhouse, chairman, Street Groups Sub-Committee, Middlesbrough Savings Committee.
- Arnold Woods, District Commandant, Ulster Special Constabulary.
- James Wrann, Chairman & Managing Director, Agamemnon Boat Yard Ltd., Bucklers Hard, Hampshire.
- Florence Harriet Wynne. For services to the Invalid Children's Aid Association.
- Hetty Wyon, Welfare Worker, Family Welfare Section, Royal Naval Barracks, Chatham.
- Leslie Carr Basher, lately Senior Executive Officer, British Military Government, Berlin (British Sector).
- George Blacktopp, Director of the Seamen's Club, Mobile.
- Edward James Caulfeild-Browne, British Pro-Consul at Rangoon.
- Joseph Cockin, British Vice-Consul at Shanghai.
- Florence Minnie Collins, Shorthand typist/Archivist at Her Majesty's Consulate in Baltimore.
- Mary Alexander Cowgill, British subject resident in Germany.
- Herbert John Davis, Honorary Treasurer of the Allen Gardiner Memorial Homes, Cordoba.
- Walter Frederick Edwin George Dorrington, Passport Examiner at Her Majesty's Embassy in Oslo.
- Lieutenant-Colonel Edward Cave Easter, British subject lately resident in Egypt.
- Joan Helen Fish, lately Her Majesty's Consul at Budapest.
- Henry Green, Communications Officer at Her Majesty's Legation in Budapest.
- Joseph Charles Imossi, British Vice Consul at Ceuta.
- Arthur Ivor Garland Jayne, British subject resident in Norway.
- Joseph William-Webster Kay, lately Honorary Secretary of the St. Andrew's Society, Montevideo.
- Hector Archibald Kempton, lately Communications Officer, Office of the Commissioner-General for Her Majesty's Government in the United Kingdom in South-East Asia.
- Koh Kim Fatt, Salaries Clerk, Office of the Commissioner-General for Her Majesty's Government in the United Kingdom in South-East Asia.
- Josephine Mary Millar, Representative of the Save the Children Fund in Greece.
- David Garnett Mitchell, lately Second Secretary at Her Majesty's Embassy in Monrovia.
- Herbert Reginald Pearce, British subject resident in Terceira (Azores).
- Ethel Sutherland Robertson, British subject resident in Chile.
- William Hector Sanguineti, lately Treasurer for the Tangier Zone, International Administration of Tangier.
- Richard Alfred Simcox, lately Assistant Education Officer, British Council, Alexandria.
- Lancelot Stell, British subject resident in Sweden.
- Joseph Soubhi Talhamy, British Pro-Consul at Amman.
- Frederick Terry, Power Station Superintendent, Sudan Light & Power Co., Khartoum.
- Harry Lever Tyrer, British Pro-Consul at Barranquilla.
- Frances Folliott Williams, British subject resident in France.
- Wallace Donald Badenhorst, a member of the Victoria Central Intensive Conservation Area Committee, Southern Rhodesia.
- Gladys Vivienne Liscarton Barlow. For voluntary services on behalf of lepers at the Mtoko Settlement and patients at the Chindamora Sanatorium, Southern Rhodesia.
- Herbert George Beard, TD. For services to the United Kingdom community in Karachi and Rawalpindi.
- Alfred James Beeby, Assistant Treasurer, Bechuanaland Protectorate.
- Alice Dorothy Chadwick Bell, Vice President of the Borradaile Trust, Marandellas, Southern Rhodesia.
- George Thomas Bell, a Member of the Committee of Management, Ararat and District Hospital, State of Victoria.
- Leonard Stanley Blease, President of the Brunswick Swimming Club, State of Victoria.
- Jeannie Marr Boggie. For charitable and social welfare services in the Gwelo District, Southern Rhodesia.
- Annie Danks. For social welfare services in the State of Victoria.
- Chief Mhau Dhlamini, of Swaziland. For services to the Administration.
- John Gregory Dore, formerly a member of the Berwick Shire Council, State of Victoria.
- Joyce Helen Galloway, Chairman of the Committee of the Fendall Home, Calcutta, India.
- Robert Eric Garmany, Chief Administrative Assistant, Local Government & Housing Department, Southern Rhodesia.
- Ernest Fleetwood Stringfellow Harding. For social welfare services, particularly in connection with young people's organisations, in the Federation of Rhodesia and Nyasaland.
- Olive Dagmar Kersley, of Bulawayo, Southern Rhodesia. For voluntary service to the care and training of the Blind.
- Alma Grace Luckie, formerly Matron of the Chest Hospital, State of Tasmania.
- Lars Henry Madsen, an aeronautical engineer, and a representative in India of Messrs. Rolls-Royce.
- Ruth Audrey Morris. For services to the United Kingdom community in Madras, India.
- Pastor Douglas Nicholls, of Fitzroy, State of Victoria. For services to the Aboriginal people.
- The Reverend Brother Patrick Gildas O'Neill, of Melbourne, State of Victoria. For services to the Blind.
- Patience Dorothea Owen, Senior Lady Clerk, Audit Department, Basutoland.
- Olive Hannibal Coates Palgrave. For services to the National Publications Trust in the Federation of Rhodesia and Nyasaland.
- Barbara Patullo, Matron of the Clare & District Hospital, State of South Australia.
- Frederick Conrad Pflaum, Honorary Secretary of the Branch in the State of South Australia of the South African War Veterans' Association.
- Gwendoline Victoria Collett Sellick, a singer of the State of South Australia. For services to charitable and patriotic organisations.
- William Johannes Strydom, Senior Soil Conservation Foreman, Basutoland.
- Samuel Thornton Msindazwe Sukati, Assistant Secretary in the Swaziland Administration.
- Frederick Bernard Hill Watermeyer, Field Husbandry Officer, Bechuanaland Protectorate.
- Ethel Maud Watson, Matron of Rydalmere Mental Hospital, State of New South Wales.
- William Francis Wynne, Supervisor of Hospital Stores and Equipment, Government Medical Service, Federation of Rhodesia and Nyasaland.
- Emanuel Albuquerque, Personal Assistant to the Permanent Secretary of the Ministry of Health & Director of Medical Services, Singapore.
- Haji Mohammed Ali bin Mohammed Rouse, Pilgrimage Control Officer, Penang, Federation of Malaya.
- George Henry Allen, JP. For public services in the Eastern Region, Nigeria.
- Alexander Hamilton Craig Anderson, Archaeological Commissioner, British Honduras.
- Rhoda Kathleen Applebee, Queen Elizabeth Overseas Nursing Service, Senior Sister Tutor, Federation of Malaya.
- Leslie Bernard Assang, Sanitary Inspector, Trinidad.
- Iman Bakash, Head Clerk, District Engineer's Office, Eldoret, East African Railways & Harbours Administration.
- Gulabrai Krapashanker Baxi, Stores Officer, Tanganyika Police Force.
- Cyril Thomas Beare, Director of Music, Uganda Police Force.
- Peter Charles Bethune Benson. For public services in Kenya.
- Frederick William Bird, Chief Superintendent, Cyprus Police Force.
- Richard Bolding Brayne, Administrative Officer, Tanganyika.
- Major James Bruce William Breckenridge, Community Development Officer, Kenya.
- Mary Bridget Cahill, Queen Elizabeth Overseas Nursing Service, Senior Matron, Federal Medical Department, Nigeria.
- Kathleen Mary Cansdell. Lately Settlement Social Welfare Officer, Malacca, Federation of Malaya.
- Lieutenant-Colonel Nigel Forbes Elliot Chaplin, MC, Executive Officer, Provincial Emergency Committee, Kenya.
- Edward Henry Clarke, Higher Clerical Officer, East African Office.
- Robert Wilson Coelho, Chief Clerk, Secretariat, Gibraltar.
- Frank Lionel Cole. For services to the Boy Scout Movement in the Bahamas.
- Louise Mabel Crawford. Lately Matron, Cottage Hospital Nursing Home, Bermuda.
- Alfred William Crofts, Director of Music, Federation of Malaya Police Force.
- Gertrude Elizabeth Smart-Dalgleish, Senior Secretary, Governor's Secretariat, British Guiana.
- Mohamed Darus bin Abdul Rahman, Senior Assistant Inspector of Malay Schools, Federation of Malaya.
- Eric Wallace Dunlop, DFC, Senior Labour Officer, Northern Rhodesia.
- Louisa Gwendolyn Maud Edwards, Examiner of Accounts, Audit Department, Antigua, Leeward Islands.
- Sebastian Thomas Nwabuoku Ejefor, Pay and Quartermaster, Nigeria Police Force.
- Frederick Esiri, MRCS, LRCP. For medical services in the Western Region, Nigeria.
- Frank Clifford Finch, District Commissioner, Chingola, Northern Rhodesia.
- Kathoni Mary Warren-Gash, Community Development Officer, Kenya.
- Emmanel Benjamin Ghansah, Auditor, Audit Department, Northern Region, Nigeria.
- Frank Neville Grannum, ED, MB, ChB. Lately Senior Medical Officer of Health, Barbados.
- Tom Marston Greensill, Agricultural Superintendent, Eastern Region, Nigeria.
- Eruch Nusserwanji Gundevia, Assistant Secretary, Zanzibar.
- William Horsford Hagley. For public services in Grenada, Windward Islands.
- Marjorie Agnes Hamer. For social welfare services in Perlis, Federation of Malaya.
- Pauline Kathleen Hamilton, Nurse, British Red Cross Society, Province Wellesley, Federation of Malaya.
- Mary Edith Hancock, Woman Education Officer, Tanganyika.
- Fazal Haq. Lately Field Officer, Department of Tsetse Control, Uganda.
- Frank Leonard Heath. For social welfare services in the Northern Region, Nigeria.
- Harold Barton Hobbins, Higher Executive Officer, Office of the Crown Agents for Oversea Governments & Administrations.
- Minnie Keziah Hodgson, Nurse, St. John Ambulance Brigade Team, Kota Tinggi, Federation of Malaya.
- The Venerable Archdeacon Agori Iwe, Church Missionary Society, Western Region, Nigeria.
- Kathleen Jardine, Nursing Sister, Kenya.
- Samuel Jeffers, Assistant Government Printer, Trinidad.
- Ivan Saja Kadama, Medical Officer, Uganda.
- Vallipuram Kanagasabai, Clerk, Treasurer & Accountant-General's Department, Federation of Malaya.
- Sister Jessie Kerridge. For social and welfare services in Jamaica.
- Moshin Hassan Khalifa, Assistant Welfare Officer, Labour & Welfare Department, Aden.
- Khor Choo Hin, Senior Assistant Auditor, Singapore.
- Arthur Vincent Clement King, Government Secretary, St. Vincent, Windward Islands.
- Paramount Chief Raymond Brima Sese Koker, Bagbo Chiefdom, Bo District, Sierra Leone.
- Charles Aryeequaye Kotey, Technical Officer, Public Works Department, Federation of Nigeria.
- Stephanus Petrus Kruger, District Officer, Kenya.
- Manchersha Manekji Kutar, MB, Assistant Medical Officer, Aden.
- Mallam Muhammadu Ladan, Programme Officer, Nigerian Broadcasting Service.
- Gnanapragasam Leo, Technical Assistant (Superscale), Telecommunications Department, Stores & Workshops, Federation of Malaya.
- Michael Maurice Veasey Leonard, District Commissioner, Nyasaland.
- Carmen Isabel Lusan, General Secretary, YWCA, Jamaica.
- Philip Louis Machado, Financial Officer, Education Department, Federation of Malaya.
- Mahmood bin Haji Yusof, Administrative Assistant, Marine Surveys, Ministry of Commerce & Industry, Singapore.
- Abdo Ahmed Maiseri, Health Inspector, Aden.
- Leslie Swettenham Marston, Manager, Lucky Hill Farming Cooperative Society Ltd., Jamaica.
- Amanda Martyres, Office Superintendent, Uganda.
- Henry Hawtayne Fortisque Mayers, Warrant Officer, British Guiana Militia Band.
- Paul Mboya, BEM. For public services in Kenya.
- Wilmot Nwakakku Mends. Lately Senior Education Officer, Sierra Leone.
- William Rae Miller. For public services in Malacca, Federation of Malaya.
- Phyllis Millicent Moffett. For services to the Girl Guide Movement in Tanganyika.
- Andrew Morris Moodie, Administrative Officer, Western Region, Nigeria.
- Petro Solomon Blandina Muganwa, Medical Officer, Uganda.
- Gordon Mwansasu. For public services in Tanganyika.
- Candiah Nagalingam, Chief Clerk, Ministry for Internal Defence & Security, Federation of Malaya.
- Paul Naudi, Information Officer, Malta.
- The Reverend Samuel Richard Stephen Nicholas. For public services in the Western Region, Nigeria.
- Bassey Eyo Nsa, Mechanical Engineer, Electricity Corporation of Nigeria, Federation of Nigeria.
- Daniel Akor Ogu, Councillor for Education, Igala Native Authority, Northern Region, Nigeria.
- Isaac Akinola Ogunmodede, Assistant Establishment Officer, Western Region, Nigeria.
- Samuel Akinbolaji Oladapo. For public services in the Western Region, Nigeria.
- Abraham Alegbe Ordia, Nursing Superintendent (Mental), Federation of Nigeria.
- Joseph Benjamin Owen, JP. For public services in Anguilla, Leeward Islands.
- Gajanan Balkrishna Panvalkar, Accounts Officer, East African Trypanosoimiasis Research Organisation.
- Frank Cecil Rhodes Parris. Lately Superintendent, Barbados Police Force.
- Shivabhai Mithabhai Patel, For public services in Tanganyika.
- Albert Oliver Payne, JP. For public services in Grenada, Windward Islands.
- Arthur James Peaker, Superintendent of Furniture & Equipment, Stores Department, Hong Kong.
- Maurice Basil Pestana. For services to sport in Penang, Federation of Malaya.
- Selva Doray Pillay, JP. For services to education in Singapore.
- Subramaniam Ampalavanar Ponniah, Financial Assistant, Geological Survey, Federation of Malaya.
- Vilikesa Ramaqa, Senior Assistant Medical Practitioner, Medical Department, Fiji.
- Edward Gilbert Rayner, Office Superintendent, Department of Veterinary Services, Tanganyika.
- Earle Thomas Henry Redrup, Dredging Superintendent, Public Works Department, Singapore.
- Olagunju Ribihun II, The Olotan of Otan (Ifelodun District Council), Western Region, Nigeria.
- James Leslie Roscoe, Senior Health Superintendent, Gambia.
- Herbert Ewart Austin Rowley, Assistant Marine Superintendent, Port Services Department, Trinidad.
- Allan Holme Russell, DSC, Administrative Officer, Uganda.
- Mohammadou Demba Sallah, Education Officer, Gambia.
- Chief Karamo Kaba Sanneh, District Chief, Kiang East District, Central Division, Gambia.
- Albert Frederick Carnelo Savory, JP, Welfare Officer, Oji River Leper Settlement, Eastern Region, Nigeria.
- Stanley Howlett Schwartzel, Architect, Public Works Department, Uganda.
- Charles Hugh Johnstone Scott, Chief Superintendent, Cyprus Police Force.
- Laurence Henry Simpson. For public services in Fiji.
- Frederick Henry Sims, Overseas Audit Service, Senior Auditor, British Solomon Islands Protectorate.
- Aloysius Singh, Deputy Registrar, Supreme Court and Deeds Registry, British Guiana.
- Vehid Salih Soubhi, Local Commandant, Special Constabulary, Limassol, Cyprus.
- The Reverend Ernest Stamp. For missionary services in Northern Rhodesia.
- Kandiah Subramaniam. For services to the Cooperative Movement in Selangor, Federation of Malaya.
- Wali Mohamed Talab s/o Talab, Tugmaster, East African Railways & Harbours Administration.
- Samuel Edward Evelyn Aiyefimih Taylor. For services to education in Sierra Leone.
- John Asirvatham Thuraisingham, Deputy Registrar of Trade Unions & Societies, Federation of Malaya.
- The Reverend Canon William Turner. For services to African education in Nyasaland.
- Chief Jonah Ukpe, Head Chief of the Ikpa Ibekwe Clan, Opobo Division, Eastern Region, Nigeria.
- John Obumneme Charles Uzowulu, Town Clerk, Enugu Municipality, Eastern Region, Nigeria.
- Anna Margaret Wales. For social welfare services in North Borneo.
- Frederick Ernest Moore Warner, Assistant Registrar of Cooperative Societies, Fiji.
- Catherine Wilge (The Reverend Mother Ignatius), Mother Superior, Kasaba Mission & Leper Settlement, Northern Rhodesia.
- David Blood Williams, Building Superintendent, Public Works Department, Somaliland.
- Ethel Marie Winter, Queen Elizabeth Overseas Nursing Service, Regional Matron, Western Region, Nigeria.
- Wong Tet Pop, Assistant Accountant, Penang Port Commission, Federation of Malaya.
- Kathleen Margaret Wood. For services to youth in North Borneo.
- Wu Wai Kay, Cooperative Officer, Cooperative & Marketing Department, Hong Kong.
- John Zachariades, Local Commandant, Special Constabulary, Larnaca, Cyprus.

Honorary Members

- Sheriff Kullatein, Headmaster, Government African School, Wajir, Kenya.
- Zakaria bin Abdul Raof, Assistant Agricultural Officer, Selangor, Federation of Malaya.
- Ellen Magdelene Ramachandram. For services to social welfare in the Federation of Malaya.
- Mohamed Jaffar bin Ahmad. Lately Technical Assistant, Federal Town Planning Department, Federation of Malaya.
- Tan Peng Khoon. For public services in Johore, Federation of Malaya.
- Ditt Singh s/o Maggar Singh. For public services in Perak, Federation of Malaya.
- Chan Kwai Chon, Paymaster, Federation of Malaya Police Force.
- Yahya bin Haji Abdul Aziz, BEM, Penghulu (Special Grade), Federation of Malaya.
- Mohammed Shamte Hamadi. Lately Supervisory Teacher, Pemba Island, Zanzibar.

=== Order of the Companions of Honour (CH) ===
- Sir Thomas Beecham, Bt. For services to music.
- The Most Reverend John Allen Fitzgerald Gregg, Archbishop of Armagh, and Primate of All Ireland.

=== Companion of the Imperial Service Order (ISO) ===
Home Civil Service

- William Abnett, Superintending Surveyor, Ministry of Works (Teddington.)
- Harold Alfred Anderton, Accountant, Charity Commission (London, SE.22.)
- Harry James Capewell, MBE, Grade 2 Officer, Branch B, Foreign Office (London, SE.19.)
- Albert Richard Cook, Chief Accountant, Ministry of Power (Gravesend.)
- Dermot Francis Fahy, assistant director of Navy Accounts, Admiralty (Bath.)
- John Glasspoole, Principal Scientific Officer, Air Ministry (London, SW.19.)
- Percy Thomas Halfhead, Grade 2 Officer, Ministry of Labour & National Service (Woking.)
- Henry Frederick Hendry, Senior Chief Executive Officer, Ministry of Agriculture, Fisheries & Food (Peacehaven.)
- George Gordon Hewlett, OBE, Principal Executive Officer (Accountant General), Commonwealth Relations Office (Bexleyheath.)
- William Stanley Hocking, OBE, Principal Actuary, Government Actuary's Department (Chelmsford.)
- William George Honnor, Principal, Ministry of Health (Sanderstead.)
- Francis William Johnson, assistant director, RAF Aircraft Research & Development Branch (Fighters), Ministry of Supply (Farnham.)
- William Rowan Kerr, Deputy Chief Veterinary Research Officer, Ministry of Agriculture for Northern Ireland (Belfast.)
- Captain Alexander Chisholm Kidd, lately Principal District Officer, Marine Survey, London District, Ministry of Transport & Civil Aviation (Sutton.)
- Claude Kingston Legg, OBE, Assistant Controller, HM Stationery Office (Thames Ditton.)
- Cyril Matthews, Principal Scientific Officer, Ministry of Defence (Haslemere.)
- Ralph William Mayhew, deputy director, Contracts Department, General Post Office (London, NW.7.)
- Douglas Neish, Controller of Stamps, Board of Inland Revenue (London, N.22.)
- Cyril Thomas Newman, Official Receiver, Board of Trade (Ruislip.)
- Walter Bain Niven, Principal, Department of Agriculture for Scotland (Falkirk.)
- Walter Prince, MBE, chief executive officer, Home Office (Orpington.)
- Edgar Edward Raymond, Collector, Board of Customs & Excise (St. Margaret's Bay.)
- William Marshal Skilling, Principal, War Office (Esher.)
- Douglas Ralph Toller, chief executive officer, Ministry of Pensions & National Insurance (Cardiff.)
- William Albert Walker, Principal, War Damage Commission & Central Land Board (Watford.)

State of South Australia & State of Tasmania

- Lyndon George Shea, Government Printer, State of Tasmania.
- John Pembroke Steele, MM, Secretary, Parliamentary Standing Committee on Public Works, State of South Australia.

Overseas Civil Service

- George Alexander Beaubrun, lately Assistant Treasurer, St. Lucia, Windward Islands.
- Wilbert Edward Boardman, Principal Establishment Officer, Trinidad.
- Edward Patrick Buckley, Executive Officer, Prisons Department, Jamaica.
- Sidney Alexander Eldon, MBE, JP, lately Comptroller of Customs, Bahamas.
- Jean Eliel Felix, Government Printer, Mauritius.
- Percy Leonard Johns, Chief Storekeeper, Public Works Department, Federation of Nigeria.
- Deryck Watts Le Mare, Director of Fisheries, Federation of Malaya and Singapore.
- Hugh Norman Myers, Colonial Postmaster, St. Lucia, Windward Islands.
- Joel Sunday Ogunsanswo Ogunnaike, Senior Assistant Secretary (Students Division), Western Region, Nigeria.
- Frederick Charles Oxford, Accounts Officer, East African Posts & Telecommunications Administration.
- George Austen Smith, Government Printer, Federation of Malaya.
- Jonathan Massaquoi Williams, lately Senior Accountant, Treasury, Sierra Leone.
- Norman Francis Wright, MBE, Agricultural Officer, Department of Agriculture, Fisheries & Forestry, Hong Kong.

=== British Empire Medal (BEM) ===
Military Division

Royal Navy

- Chief Petty Officer Norman Arnold, P/JX.130293.
- Chief Engine Room Artificer Ernest Frederick Ball, DSM, P/MX.54367.
- Chief Petty Officer Cook (S) Robert Balmer, P/MX.52137.
- Chief Aircraft Artificer Basil Henry Blakeman, L/FX.75378.
- Chief Wren Cook (S) Nettie Emily Chapman, 12338, Women's Royal Naval Service.
- Chief Engine Room Artificer Charles Frederick Morton Clark, C/MX.46000.
- Chief Petty Officer Telegraphist Lionel Ralph Phillip Crate, C/JX.140115.
- Chief Petty Officer Christopher Leslie Grossman, DSM, C/JX.667442.
- Chief Petty Officer Writer Bernard. Miles Feltham, P/MX.60044.
- Stores Chief Petty Officer (V) Norman John Drummond Finley, P/M.38965.
- Colour Sergeant Samuel Reginald Thomas Fulton, Ch.X.3130, Royal Marines.
- Chief Petty Officer George Edward Gaskell, C/JX.147193.
- Sick Berth Chief Petty Officer Norman Hamill Knox, P/MX.53239.
- Engine Room Artificer 2nd Class Ernest Melville Lee, P/MX.770032.
- Chief Petty Officer Robert Linscott, P/JX.144406.
- Stores Chief Petty Officer (S) Charles William John Mason, C/MX.51524.
- Chief Engine Room Artificer Harold Metcalf, C/MX.53129.
- Chief Ordnance Artificer Roland Henry Murley, D/MX.55287.
- Master-at-Arms John Joseph O'Callaghan, D/MX.509471.
- Chief Yeoman of Signals Joseph Patterson, DSM, D/JX.134113.
- Quartermaster Sergeant Herbert James Prothero, RMV.201276, Royal Marine Forces Volunteer Reserve.
- Chief Air Fitter (O) Stanley Reed, L/FX.77094.
- Quartermaster Sergeant Albert Rendell, Ply.X.1448, Royal Marines.
- Chief Radio Electrical Artificer Philip Henry Rice, C/MX.804199.
- Chief Radio Electrician Reginald Murray Ring, P/MX.766202.
- Petty Officer Engineering Mechanic Augustus Stephen James Thorne, P/K.60642.
- Chief Wren Regulating Joan Lilian Turner, 916, Women's Royal Naval Service.
- Chief Air Fitter (O) William Archibald Yenning, L/FX.77069.
- Chief Petty Officer Andrew Black Wood, DSM, C/JX.126242.
- Chief Yeoman of Signals Sidney Ralph Wood, P/JX.134285.

In recognition of distinguished services in the Operations in the Near East, October–December 1956.

- Chief Engine Room Artificer Ernest Walter Bastin, DSM, D/MX.54340, HMS Eagle.
- Acting Yeoman of Signals Reginald Dainty, P/JX.581680, HMS Chevron.
- Chief Aircraft Artificer Russell George King, L/FX.75251, 845 Royal Naval Air Squadron.
- Chief Petty Officer Cook (S) Royston Leslie Russell, P/MX.48443, HMS Armada.
- Chief Amman Harold Reuben Joshua Showell, L/FX.670678, HMS Albion.
- Chief Engine Room Artificer Joseph Eric Whitenstall, DSM, P/MX.57728, HMS Bulwark.

Army

- 21005728 Warrant Officer Class II (Provisional) Dennis Harry Arthur Alexander, Royal Corps of Signals, Territorial Army.
- 2653688 Colour-Sergeant (acting) John Arthur Granville Ayre, Coldstream Guards.
- 31657 Regimental-Sergeant-Major Mallam Banana, The Queen's Own Nigeria Regiment, Royal West African Frontier Force.
- 14498251 Staff-Sergeant (acting) Robert Treyelyan Barnard, Corps of Royal Engineers.
- 816279 Sergeant Stanley Aubrey Barnett, Army Catering Corps.
- Warrant Officer Class II Amidu Benali, 1st (Nyasaland) Battalion, The King's African Rifles.
- 5883365 Staff-Sergeant Mark Ernest Bodfish, Corps of Royal Electrical & Mechanical Engineers.
- 23115742 Corporal (acting) (now Sapper) David John Brewer, Corps of Royal Engineers.
- 3516944 Battery-Quartermaster-Sergeant John Thomas Buckley, Royal Regiment of Artillery, Territorial. Army.
- 22232994 Sergeant Francis David Burke, Royal Army Ordnance Corps.
- 22291261 Sergeant James Ean Burns, Royal Regiment of Artillery.
- 21005675 Staff-Sergeant Edward Christopher Byrne, Royal Corps of Signals.
- 913453 Battery-Quartermaster-Sergeant Harold Frederick Camm, MM, Royal Regiment of Artillery, Territorial Army.
- Sergeant Cornelius Henry Coakley, Southern Rhodesia Medical Force (Territorial Force).
- 1894393 Warrant Officer Class II (acting) Peter Reginald Conway, Corps of Royal Engineers.
- 2549254 Staff-Sergeant (acting) Derek William Cooper, Corps of Royal Electrical & Mechanical Engineers.
- S/7880128 Staff-Sergeant Richard Cosway, Royal Army Service Corps, Territorial Army.
- 14190768 Warrant Officer Class II (acting) Arthur Couch, Corps of Royal Engineers.
- 22293075 Staff-Sergeant (acting) Norman Edward Dalby, 14th/20th King's Hussars, Royal Armoured Corps.
- 7893057 Sergeant Desmond Peter Donovan, Royal Tank Regiment, Royal Armoured Corps.
- 22211389 Sergeant (acting) Bernard Geoffrey Dyer, Corps of Royal Engineers.
- 22393268 Sergeant Francis Edwin Ellison, Royal Army Ordnance Corps.
- S/4699441 Warrant Officer Class II (acting) Albert Green, MM, Royal Army Service Corps.
- 14200838 Staff-Sergeant Albert Graham Hillier, Corps of Royal Engineers.
- 22535311 Warrant Officer Class II (acting) (now Sergeant) Albert Ernest Hollick, Royal Regiment of Artillery.
- 10596529 Staff-Sergeant Frank Holmes, Royal Army Ordnance Corps.
- 22542577 Sergeant Charles Henry Robert Howse, The Parachute Regiment, Glider Pilot & Parachute Corps.
- Lance-Corporal Hussain bin Haji Darus, Home Guard, Federation of Malaya.
- Staff Sergeant (temporary Warrant Officer) Otto Johansen, Fiji Military Forces.
- Corporal Crichton Juma, 2nd (Nyasaland) Battalion, The King's African Rifles.
- Sergeant Keling bin Johan, Home Guard, Federation of Malaya.
- 2062001 Staff-Sergeant Edward John Kidd, Corps of Royal Engineers.
- 22525166 Sergeant Charles William Kitchen, Royal Corps of Signals.
- 4266831 Sergeant George Thomas Laws, The Royal Northumberland Fusiliers, Territorial Army.
- 803311 Warrant Officer Class II (acting) Gabriel Anthony Joseph Markey, Royal Corps of Signals.
- 22783659 Staff-Sergeant Eric Samuel Jesse Marriott, Corps of Royal Engineers, Territorial Army.
- 6008174 Sergeant James Lindley Milnes, Army Catering Corps.
- 22271813 Sergeant William John Craig Nimick, The Parachute Regiment, Glider Pilot & Parachute Corps.
- NA/45064 Sergeant Albert Offor, Nigerian Military Engineers.
- 3240411 Sergeant William Park, The Cameronians (Scottish Rifles), Territorial Army.
- W/294 Sergeant Florence Pearson, Women's Royal Army Corps.
- 5883040 Sergeant William John Phillips, The Northamptonshire Regiment.
- 4689677 Sergeant Henry Playfor, Royal Regiment of Artillery.
- W/CA/273549 Sergeant (acting) Cynthia Marjorie Samuda, Women's Royal Army Corps.
- 22265975 Staff-Sergeant (acting) Dennis Smith, Royal Corps of Signals.
- 2322063 Staff-Sergeant James Champion Smith, Royal Corps of Signals.
- 5333108 Sergeant Arthur Richard Sparks, Royal Regiment of Artillery, Territorial Army.
- 22537398 Sergeant Norman Wilfred Squince, Royal Corps of Signals.
- 1746198 Battery-Quartermaster-Sergeant (acting) (now Sergeant) George William Turner, Royal Regiment of Artillery.
- 847342 Staff-Sergeant (Artillery Clerk) James Will, Royal Regiment of Artillery.
- S/5495262 Warrant Officer Class II (acting) Doylah Williams, Royal Army Service Corps.
- T/91617 Warrant Officer Class II (acting) John Frederick Wren, Royal Army Service Corps.
- 921903 Sergeant Charles William George Youngs, Corps of Royal Electrical & Mechanical Engineers, Territorial Army.

In recognition of distinguished services in the Operations in the Near East, October–December 1956.

- 22974056 Warrant Officer Class II (acting) William Albert Gordon Farrell, Corps of Royal Engineers.
- S/22891078 Staff Sergeant (acting) Arthur Ralph Ezard, Royal Army Service Corps.
- 23102933 Private Francis Mahon, The Royal Scots (The Royal Regiment).

Royal Air Force

- 578391 Flight Sergeant John Gordon Beardon.
- 572240 Flight Sergeant Charles Bohan Browne.
- 2684092 Flight Sergeant Edward Henry Cornish, Royal Auxiliary Air Force.
- 448595 Flight Sergeant Edna Lilian Davies, Women's Royal Air Force.
- 569520 Flight Sergeant Charles Vivian Edmonds.
- 568764 Flight Sergeant Thomas Forster Elliot.
- 552809 Flight Sergeant William Colin Faulkner.
- 1286447 Flight Sergeant Horace Stanley King.
- 2650457 Flight Sergeant Fred Miskin, Royal Auxiliary Air Force.
- 654085 Flight Sergeant Joseph Patrick O' Neill.
- 652065 Flight Sergeant Ernest William Stone.
- 935130 Flight Sergeant Hugh Adams Sturgeon.
- 567935 Flight Sergeant William Henry Taylor.
- 527029 Flight Sergeant William Henry Tucker.
- 943517 Flight Sergeant James Edward Whittingham.
- 3201018 Chief Technician Stanley William Hinds.
- 510125 Chief Technician Cyril Newton.
- 621363 Chief Technician Charles Walter Peeke.
- 780379 Acting Flight Sergeant Andrew Billings.
- 542517 Acting Flight Sergeant George Frank Dimond.
- 1566342 Acting Flight Sergeant John Morrison.
- 573849 Acting Flight Sergeant Kenneth Salt.
- 539605 Acting Flight Sergeant Thomas Wilkinson.
- 4033716 Sergeant George Benbow.
- 2609319 Sergeant Anthony Wilford Blake, Royal Auxiliary Air Force Regiment.
- 521506 Sergeant Wilfred David Bright.
- 519777 Sergeant Reginald. Anthony Hall.
- 524949 Sergeant Edward Selby Hennell.
- 710034 Sergeant Vernon Hinton.
- 2283772 Sergeant Thomas William Luke.
- 446111 Sergeant Joan Margaret Agatha Maclennan, Women's Royal Air Force.
- 1432027 Sergeant John Melbourne Mooring.
- 533083 Sergeant Frederick Battarbee Morris.
- 536674 Sergeant Jack Hinton Palmer.
- 552401 Sergeant Douglas Roy Read.
- 513473 Sergeant William Wallace.
- 566856 Senior Technician Donald Barman.
- 584181 Acting Sergeant Derek Frank Garrett.
- 3200075 Acting Sergeant John Griffiths.
- 1922340 Corporal Robert Moore.
- 4099528 Corporal Henry Michael James .
- 4030522 Corporal William Thomas.
- 4138835 Corporal Derek John Trust, Royal Air Force Regiment.
- 4052301 Corporal Technician James Michael Crilly.
- 2678517 Senior Aircraftman William Lowry, Royal Auxiliary Air Force Regiment.

In recognition of distinguished services in the Operations in the Near East, October–December 1956.

- 571157 Flight Sergeant John Cadman Houghton.
- 615276 Chief Technician Robert Ovenstone.
- 610735 Acting Flight Sergeant Charles William Goble.
- 531892 Acting Flight Sergeant Tom Harding.
- 3083674 Sergeant Charles Albert Bailey.
- 573204 Sergeant Frederick Thomas Cruikshank.
- 1665220 Corporal Horace Owen Sainsbury.

Civil Division

United Kingdom

- Frank Abel, Foreman Fitter, Laporte Acids Ltd. (Hunt's Branch), Castleford.
- Joseph George Arundell, Bricklayer, South Eastern Division, Central Electricity Authority (Maidstone.)
- Margaret Ashby, Collector, Leadenflower Savings Group, Crieff.
- Ernest Auty, Workshop Inspector. British Transport Waterways (Goole.)
- Edward Frank Ayres, Park Superintendent, London County Council (London, NW.ll.)
- John Thomas Bailey, Gasfitter, Barnsley Undertaking, East Midlands Gas Board (Barnsley.)
- Elizabeth Baker, Senior Chief Supervisor (Telephones), Joint Trunk Exchange, Liverpool..
- Archibald John Barnes, Master Craftsman, National Maritime Museum (London, SE.12.)
- Marion Eliza Beauchamp, Honorary Collector, High Street, Heytesbury, Savings Group, Wanninster.
- Hugh Hamilton Biggers, Chief Inspector, Head Post Office, Edinburgh.
- Richard John Binfield, Chief Steward, SS Maltasian, Ellerman Lines Ltd. (Ilford, Essex.)
- Harold Blackburn, Senior District Inspector, North Eastern Region, British Railways (Newcastle.)
- Aldwyn Blyton, Head Storekeeper, New Stubbin Colliery, North Eastern Division, National Coal Board (Rotherham.)
- Ernest Boddy, Head Shepherd, Southburn, Driffield, Yorkshire (York.)
- John Boyd, Colliery Chief Mechanical Engineer, Auchincruive 1/2/3 Colliery, Scottish Division, National Coal Board (Prestwick.)
- Richard Bracegirdle, Collier, Ifton Colliery, North Western Division, National Coal Board (Oswestry.)
- Percy Broquant Braun, Shop Foreman, No.3 Maintenance Unit, Woodcote, Air Ministry (Reading.)
- Thomas David Buckle, Laboratory Worker, Grade A, Atomic Weapons Research Establishment, Aldermaston (Reading.)
- Rosemary K. Bullen, Deputy Head, Civil Defence Headquarters Section, Bexhill-on-Sea.
- William Charles Burford, Locomotive Driver, Eastern Region, British Transport Commission (Grantham.)
- Francis Edward Burgess, Chargeman of Electrical Fitters, Royal Navy Mine Depot, Gosport (Fareham.)
- Jonathan Burridge, Jointer, South Eastern Electricity Board (Chatham.)
- Laura Freeman Butler, Honorary Collector, Rosefield Road Savings Group, Staines, Middlesex.
- Magdalene Caldwell, Centre Organiser, Aberlour, Women's Voluntary Services.
- Isabella Cargill, Collector, Streets No. 11 Savings Group, Arbroath.
- Charles Frederick Carlisle, Commandant, Nottingham City Special Constabulary.
- Ernest Gaunt, Ripper, Handsworth Colliery, North Eastern Division, National Coal Board (Sheffield.)
- Frederick Thomas Conder, Principal Foreman, No.217 Maintenance Unit, Cardington, Air Ministry (Bedford.)
- John Connor, Foreman Blacksmith, Clyde Alloy Steel Co. Ltd. (Motherwell.)
- Edward Gwilt Cotsworth, Leading Draughtsman, Royal Aircraft Establishment, Farnborough, Ministry of Supply.
- Benjamin Crowther, Safety Officer, Highley Colliery, West Midlands Division, National Coal Board (Kidderminster.)
- William John Crump, Warden, TA Centre, Edmonton, London.
- George Henry Cubbon, Carpenter, SS Maskeliya, Thos.& Jno. Brocklebank Ltd. (Carluke, Lanarkshire.)
- James Cunningham, District Motive Power Inspector, Scottish Region, British Railways (Edinburgh.)
- Walter Joseph Curtis, Foreman, Sandersons Fabrics (Arthur Sanderson & Sons Ltd.) (Hillingdon, Middlesex.)
- Herbert George Davey, Sawyer, Chas. R. Watson & Co. Ltd., Bury St. Edmunds.
- Benjamin Thomas Davies, Assistant Supervisor, Dinas Rescue Station, South Western Division, National Coal Board (Rhondda.)
- Thomas William Davies, Sheet Metal Worker, Marston Excelsior Ltd, Wolverhampton (Bilston.)
- George Percy Davis, Civilian Warrant Officer, No.61 Group ATC/CCF (RAF Section), Hendon (Ilford, Essex.)
- Charles William Brown Deacon, Works Foreman, Boston Undertaking, East Midlands Gas Board (Boston, Lincolnshire.)
- George Christmas Dix, Works' Superintendent, Pembroke Gasworks, Wales Gas Board (Pembroke Dock.)
- Richard Dixon, Appliance Maintenance Man, Blackburn Group, North Western Gas Board.' (Blackburn.)
- Alice Bertha Donovan, Supervisor (F), International Radio Exchange, General Post Office (Horley, Surrey.)
- James Donovan, JP, Repairer, Tirpentwys Colliery, South Western Division, National Coal Board (Pontypool.)
- Harry J. Dowd, Maintenance Manager, John Waddington Ltd., Leeds.
- Charles William Dumbrell, Donkeyman, RFA Eddyreef, Admiralty (Gillingham. Kent.)
- James Duncan, Technician Class I, Telephone Manager's Office, Liverpool.
- Richard Frederick George Barley, Salvage Diver, HM Boom Defence Depot, Greenock, Admiralty. (Greenock.)
- William Edward Eaton, Fitter, First Class, Hendon Depot, Ministry of Transport & Civil Aviation (London, NW.9.)
- John Eckersley, Joiner, W. T. Glover & Co. Ltd., Manchester.
- David Elliott, Hired Shipwright, HM Dockyard, Portsmouth.
- Edward Ernest Fairs, Inspector, London Postal School, General Post Office. (Harrow.)
- Bertie William Fairweather, Mason Chargehand Grade I, Hayles Abbey, Gloucestershire, Ministry of Works.
- Peggy Ferguson, Assistant County Organiser, Yorkshire, East Riding, Women's Voluntary Services (Filey.)
- William John Fishley, General Consumer Service Inspector, Plymouth-Cornwall Division, South Western Gas Board (Plymouth.)
- Herbert Samuel James Frost, Technical Officer, Telephone Manager's Office, Coventry.
- Alfred Arthur Gillings, Able Seaman, MV Severity, F. T. Everard & Sons Ltd. (Dereham, Norfolk.)
- Francis Ernest Glasson, Marker Out, Royal Carriage Factory, Royal Ordnance Factories, Woolwich, Ministry of Supply (Bexleyheath, Kent.)
- George Goldsack, Non-Technical Grade II, Atomic Weapons Research Establishment, Woolwich Common. (London, SE.18.)
- James Thomas Gordon, Clerk, Grade I, War Office, Gibraltar.
- William Green, Forester, Ministry of Agriculture for Northern Ireland (Castlecaldwell, County Fermanagh.)
- Albert Edward Greenacre, lately Leading Observer, Post 6/R.2, No.6 Group, Royal Observer Corps, Norwich.
- Henry Robert Griffin, lately Store Superintendent, Central Ordnance Depot, Aldershot, War Office.
- Edwin Archer Hall, Chargehand, RAF West Mailing, Air Ministry.
- Albert Halliwell, Personnel Manager and Safety Officer, Transparent Paper Ltd., Bury.
- Hugh Grant McPherson Hardie, Chief Reconnaissance Officer, Aberdeen Division, Civil Defence Corps.
- Ernest William Harrison, Cable-Jointer, Electricity Board for Northern Ireland (Bangor, County Down.)
- John Twentyman Harrison, Station Officer, West Riding of Yorkshire Fire Brigade (Mirfield.)
- Sidney Hills. Foreman Service Layer, Kent Suburban District, South Eastern Gas Board, (Crayford.)
- Evelyn May Hiscock, Assistant Supervisor (Telegraphs), Head Post Office, Pontypridd.
- Charles Vincent Horsley, Sub-Postmaster, Martock, Somerset.
- Alfred William Howard, Civilian Instructor Grade III, School of Photography, RAF Wellesbourne, Air Ministry.
- Thomas Percy Huggett, Overseer, Counter and Telegraph Section, South Eastern District Post Office, London (Godstone, Surrey.)
- Arthur Hughes, Leading Turbine Driver, Uskmouth Power Station, South Wales Division, Central Electricity Authority (Newport.)
- Georgina Augusta Humphrey, Honorary Collector, Street Savings Group, Tunbridge Wells, Kent.
- William Hunt, Senior Storeman, Proof & Experimental Establishment, Woolwich, Ministry of Supply (London, SE.18.)
- John L. Hunter, Foreman Steel Erector, Harland & Wolff Ltd., Belfast.
- George Edward Jones, Foreman, L. Brown & Co., Wilmslow (Knutsford, Cheshire.)
- William Smith Jordan, Blind Welfare Officer, Borough of West Ham (London, E.15.)
- Nicos Karkaletsos, Clerk of Works, War Office, Nicosia.
- Frank Kelley, Chief Inspector, Metropolitan Police (London, SW.1.)
- George Kennedy, Research & Development Craftsman Special (Instrument Maker), Royal Aircraft Establishment, Farnborough, Ministry of Supply.
- James Henry Laing, Skilled Machinist, English Steel Corporation Ltd., Sheffield.
- Ronald. George Lascelles, Deputy Chief Warden, Civil Defence Corps, Liverpool (Wirral.)
- William Leahy, Station Warden, RAF Abingdon, Air Ministry.
- Edwin Frederick Lindridge, Foreman of Trades, Headquarters, No.90 Group, Air Ministry (Yiewsley, Middlesex.)
- John Patrick Littlefield, Storekeeper, Ministry of Works (London, SW.4.)
- George Lumsden, Wasteman, Wearmouth Colliery, Durham Division, National Coal Board (Sunderland.)
- Harry Lynam, Senior Knitting Operative, Allen, Solly & Co. Ltd., Nottingham.
- Charles McCulloch, Senior Inspector of Works, North of Scotland Hydro-Electric Board Scheme (Elgin, Morayshire.)
- Albert Davis McFarlane, Foreman Erector, George Clark & North Eastern Marine (Sunderland) Ltd (Sunderland.)
- John Alexander MacKenzie. For mountain rescue work in the Isle of Skye (Portree.)
- David Mackie, Underground Repairer, Hassockrigg Colliery, Scottish Division, National Coal Board (Shorts, Lanarkshire.)
- Neil McLean, Sergeant, Inverness-shire Constabulary. For mountain rescue work in the Isle of Skye (Portree.)
- Elizabeth Magee, Honorary Collector, Street Savings Group, Belfast.
- John Henry Mahoney, Reader, Departmental Press, HM Stationery Office (Eastcote, Middlesex.)
- Harry Makepeace, Boatswain, SS Stanfirth, Stanhope Steamship Co. Ltd. (Danby, Yorkshire.)
- William Marriott, lately Foreman Fitter, Blackwell Coke Ovens, East Midlands Division, National Coal Board (Blackwell, Derbyshire.)
- David Martin, Sub-Postmaster, Carlisle Circus Town Sub-Office, Belfast.
- William Henry Meadowcroft, Head Civil Defence Warden, Manchester.
- William Henry Miller, Storekeeper, Shaw Savill & Albion Co. Ltd. (London, E.6.)
- Arthur Monck, Technical Works Engineer, Grade II, Government Communications Headquarters (Cheltenham.)
- Thomas Henry Moody, Architectural & Civil Engineering Assistant, Grade II, Air Ministry (Waltham Cross.)
- Laurence Moore, Commandant, Wakefield City Special Constabulary.
- Heber Moorhouse, Foreman Electrician, Harland & Wolff Ltd., Southampton.
- Thomas Phillip Morgan, MM, Colliery Overman, Addison Colliery, Durham Division, National Coal Board (Ryton-on-Tyne.)
- David George Morris, Inspector, Cardiff City Police. (Cardiff.)
- Ernest Percival George Oddy, MC, Post Warden and Staff Officer to Chief Civil Defence Warden, Exeter.
- George Charles Packer, Assistant Divisional Officer, London Fire Brigade (London, SE.1.)
- Emily Ruth Pagels, Honorary Collector, Street Savings Group, Thurrock, Essex.
- James Parkinson, Datal Worker, Linton Colliery, Northern (N. & C.) Division, National Coal Board (Ashington, Northumberland.)
- Cecilia Annie Pearce, Divisional Superintendent, Lewisham Nursing Division, St. John Ambulance Brigade (London, SE.13.)
- Edmond Perini, Cargo Department, Stapledons, Shipping Agents, Port Said.
- Mary Hearty Peterson, Hostel Supervisor, Braddell Hill, Singapore.
- Alfred William Phillips, Storekeeper, National Sea Training School, Gravesend (Strood, Kent.)
- Alfred Charles Pincott, Laboratory Superintendent, Turbine Systems Development, Plessey Co. Ltd., Ilford.
- Gerald Arthur Plant, Member, Coast Life Saving Corps & Volunteer-in-Charge, Lulworth Cove LSA Company, Dorset.
- William Maurice Pottow, Postal and Telegraph Officer, Windsor Castle Town Sub Office, Windsor (Slough.)
- Herbert Percival Powney, JP, Postman, Halifax.
- Thomas Henry Prendergast, Head Storekeeper, West Riding of Yorkshire Territorial and Auxiliary Forces Association (York.)
- George Edward Punshon, Electrician, North Eastern Electricity Board (Sunderland).
- Harry Randall, Chief Inspector, Post Office, Nottingham.
- William Randall, Head Gardener, French Region, Imperial War Graves Commission.
- Norman Frank Rapps, Chief Reconnaissance Officer, HQ Section, Civil Defence Corps, Denbighshire (Wrexham.)
- Cecil James Richards, Senior Overlooker, Grade "A", Royal Ordnance Factory, Chorley, Ministry of Supply (Preston.)
- Leonard William Percy Richardson, Mechanical Maintenance Engineer, Black Sluice Drainage Board, Lincolnshire (Bourne.)
- John Brown Robertson, Sub-Officer, South Eastern Area Fire Brigade, Scotland (Dunbar.)
- Francis Joseph Robinson, Radio Operator, Class I, Post Office Radio Station, Highbridge, Somerset.
- James Leslie Ross, Chief Officer, Class II, HM Prison Perth.
- Jane Corbett Rowlands, Canteen Manageress, Navy, Army & Air Force Institutes, Towyn.
- Victor Stanley Sackett, Leading Draughtsman, Signals Research and Development Establishment, Ministry of Supply (Christchurch, Hampshire.)
- Sa'id Abdul Samad, Car Driver, HM Embassy, Amman.
- Ida Sandercombe, Chief Supervisor (Telephones), Head Post Office, Portsmouth (Southsea.)
- Joseph William Sears, Rodent Operator, Ministry of Agriculture, Fisheries & Food (Sevenoaks, Kent.)
- George Frederick Silcox, Senior Storekeeper, Sea Transport Division, Cardiff, Ministry of Transport & Civil Aviation (Newport, Monmouthshire.)
- Harold Victor Skeats, Inspector, Denbighshire Special Constabulary (Wrexham.)
- Lilian Olive Smart, Assistant County Borough Organiser, Derby, Women's Voluntary Services.
- Edith Smith, Honorary Collector, Street Savings Group, Brecon, South Wales.
- John Smith, Chargehand Fitter, Nechells "A" Power Station, Midlands Division, Central Electricity Authority (Solihull.)
- Douglas Spence, Site Welding Engineer, Whessoe Ltd. (Chester.)
- Victoria Rose Spencer, Honorary Collector, Street Savings Group, Swinton, Lancashire.
- Cecil Steel, Senior Foreman of Works, HM Prison Pentonville.
- Leonard Steen, Salvage Diver, Admiralty (Rosyth.)
- Gertrude Stevens, Centre Organiser, Shaftesbury, Women's Voluntary Services.
- John MacIntyre Stewart, Chargehand Linesman, South of Scotland Electricity Board (Glasgow.)
- William Strong, School Staff Instructor, Eastbourne College (Pevensey.)
- Albert Edward Stubbs, Acting Chief Inspector, War Department Constabulary, War Office (Longtown, Cumberland.)
- Henry Francis Symondson, Chief Paperkeeper, War Office (Hayes, Middlesex.)
- William Basil Thompson, Technical Officer, Telephone Manager's Office, Newcastle upon Tyne.
- William B. Thomson, Janitor, Larkhall Academy, Lanarkshire.
- Alice Tucker, Nursing Assistant, Aston Hall Hospital, Aston-on-Trent, near Derby.
- Reuben Unwin, Supervisor, Air Ministry Aviation Fuel Depot, Norfolk.
- Charles Herbert Voller, Leading Technical Officer, Sloane Automatic Telephone Exchange, London (London, N.22.)
- Norman Walker, Salvage Diver, HM Boom Defence Depot, Greenock, Admiralty (Northshields, Northumberland.)
- Frederick Waring, Deputy, Grimethorpe Colliery, North Eastern Division, National Coal Board (Barnsley.)
- Frederick William Watson, Superintendent, Automatic Machine Shop, Simmonds Aerocessories Ltd., Treforest Industrial Estate. (Cardiff.)
- Andrew Watt, Mechanic Examiner, Inspectorate of Electrical & Mechanical Equipment, Ministry of Supply (Glasgow.)
- Arthur Percy Weaver, Station Officer, Isle of Wight Fire Brigade.
- John William Webb, Mains Construction Foreman, North Western Electricity Board (Manchester.)
- Robert Weir, Signalman, Special Class, London Midland Region, British Railways (Blackburn.)
- Thomas Weston, Surface Fitter & Pipeman, Mapperley Colliery, East Midlands Division, National Coal Board (Woodhouse, Derbyshire.)
- Victor William Wheaton, Chief Officer, Class 1, HM Prison Leeds.
- Lilian Whiteley, Honorary Collector, Watch House Lane No.2 & Queens Drive Savings Group, Doncaster.
- William Williamson, Commandant, Staffordshire Branch, British Red Cross Society (Stoke-on-Trent.)
- William John Wilson, Sergeant, Royal Ulster Constabulary (Belfast.)
- Ernest Windsor, Meter Shop Foreman, Coventry District, West Midlands Gas Board (Coventry.)
- James Walter Wooltorton, Foreman, F. N. F. Machinery Manufacturing Co. Ltd., Burton-on-Trent.
- Joseph Edward Wright, Shotfirer, Bowburn Colliery, Durham Division, National Coal Board (Coxhoe, County Durham.)
- Joseph Howard Yardley, Foreman, G. A. Harvey & Co. (London) Ltd. (London, SE.18.)
- Lim Than Yong, Overseer, Grade I, HM Naval Base, Singapore.
- Yvan Zarb, lately of Zarb Shipping Agency, Port Said.

Australia

- Henry Rudolf Brosche, Fisherman and Lighthouse Mail Carrier, Port Albert, State of Victoria.

Overseas Territories

- Elizabeth Jackson, Head Teacher, St. Agatha's School, Kwebanna, North West District, British Guiana.
- Sahadeo Binasaree Persaud, Sicknurse & Dispenser, Beterverwagting and Triumph Village District, British Guiana.
- Albert Dierre Walcott-Landes, Senior Surveyor, Survey Department, Gambia.
- Wong Wah Shun, Chief Engineer, Hong Kong Police Force.
- Samuel Alexander Robinson, lately Agricultural Assistant, Agriculture Department, Jamaica.
- Abdi Ahamed, Assistant Inspector, Kenya Police Force.
- Isaac Githaiga, 1st Grade Tribal Policeman, Nyeri District, Central Province, Kenya.
- Ruben Munene s/o Rimunya, Tribal Policeman, Embu District, Kenya.
- Wanjohi s/o Mbarire, Headman, Fort Hall District, Central Province, Kenya.
- Chan An Kit, lately Laboratory Attendant, Institute for Medical Research, Federation of Malaya.
- Violet Henrietta Kinsey, Matron, Negri Sembilan Children's Home, Federation of Malaya.
- George Bosco Lazaroo, Clerk, Malacca, Federation of Malaya.
- Liew Peng Hoe, Junior Civil Liaison Officer, 7th Battalion, The Malay Regiment, Federation of Malaya.
- Hilary James Peterson, Labour Foreman, Penang Municipal Electricity Supply Department, Federation of Malaya.
- Anne Salmiah binti Abdul Majeed, Principal, Princess Elizabeth School for the Blind, Johore, Federation of Malaya.
- Soo Hoy Wah. For public services in Negri Sembilan, Federation of Malaya.
- Wong Chan Wah, Chief Food Denial Inspector, Supplies Department, Federation of Malaya.
- Mauro Kwamnege, Sergeant-Major, Nigeria Police Force.
- Emmanuel Abiona Jiboku, Sub-Inspector, Electricity Corporation of Nigeria, Western Region, Nigeria.
- Jaafar bin Abdul Ghani, Broadcasting Assistant, Grade III, Singapore.
- Alfred Shungu, Clerk, Provincial Administration, Tanganyika.
- Maurice Alexis, Manager, Tacarigua Orphanage, Trinidad.
- Jesse Ndahura, Chief Medical Assistant, Ongino Leprosy Centre, Uganda.
- Francica Dorival, Matron, Princess Margaret Hospital, Dominica, Windward Islands.
- Violet Findlay, Departmental Sister, Colony Hospital, Grenada, Windward Islands.

=== Royal Victorian Medal (RVM) ===
In Silver

- Edith Arter.
- 584439 Sergeant Donald Austin Budden, Royal Air Force.
- Police Constable John Edward Bugg, Metropolitan Police.
- Thomas Clark.
- Elizabeth Calder.
- Meredith Vaughan Davies.
- Arthur Emmerton.
- Frederick Arthur Hurdwell.
- Ernest Edward Meathrel.
- 4032989 Corporal Thomas Moon, Royal Air Force.
- Bandmaster Roy Morgan, RMB.X.2771, Royal Marines.
- Harold William Puzey.
- Charles Henry Stephen.
- Police Constable George Wilson, Metropolitan Police.

=== Distinguished Service Order (DSO) ===
In recognition of gallant and distinguished services in the Operations in the Near East, October–December 1956.

- Brigadier Reginald William Madoc, OBE, 3 Commando Brigade, Royal Marines.
- Lieutenant-Colonel David Gratiaen Tweed, MBE, 40 Commando, Royal Marines.
- Lieutenant-Colonel Paul Edwin Crook, OBE (68434), The Queen's Own Royal West Kent Regiment.

==== Bar to Distinguished Service Order ====
In recognition of gallant and distinguished services in the Operations in the Near East, October–December 1956.

- Lieutenant-General Sir Hugh Charles Stockwell, KCB, KBE, DSO (23894), Staff, late Infantry.
- Brigadier Mervyn Andrew Haldane Butler, DSO, MC (58152), Staff, late Infantry.

=== Royal Red Cross (RRC) ===
- Major Phyllis Grant Bennett (206058), Queen Alexandra's Royal Army Nursing Corps.
- Squadron Officer Jessie Mary Higgins, ARRC (405223), Princess Mary's Royal Air Force Nursing Service.

==== Associate of the Royal Red Cross (ARRC) ====
- Mary Elizabeth Lewis, Superintending Sister, Queen Alexandra's Royal Naval Nursing Service.
- Jean Margaret Allan Workman. Head VAD Nursing Member.
- Major Honor Moira Carroll (206078), Queen Alexandra's Royal Army Nursing Corps.
- Captain Elizabeth Margaret Hewson (353077), Queen Alexandra's Royal Army Nursing Corps.
- Major Lilian Mary Tibbs (206487), Queen Alexandra's Royal Army Nursing Corps.
- Flight Officer Bridget Stack (407222), Princess Mary's Royal Air Force Nursing Service.

=== Distinguished Service Cross (DSC) ===
In recognition of gallant and distinguished services in the Operations in the Near East, October–December 1956.

Royal Navy

- Lieutenant-Commander Eric Charles Day, HMS Forth
- Lieutenant-Commander Royston Leonard Eveleigh, 802 Royal Naval Air Squadron.
- Lieutenant-Commander Charles Vyvyan Howard, 830 Royal Naval Air Squadron.

Royal Air Force

- Squadron Leader Dennis Christopher Lawrence Kearns, AFC (151961).
- Flying Officer Robert Charles Olding (309866).

==== Bar to the Distinguished Service Cross ====
In recognition of gallant and distinguished services in the Operations in the Near East, October–December 1956.

- Lieutenant-Commander Maurice William Henley, DSC, 893 Royal Naval Air Squadron.
- Lieutenant-Commander Peter Melville Lamb, DSC, AFC, 810 Royal Naval Air Squadron.

=== Military Cross (MC) ===
In recognition of gallant and distinguished services in the Operations in the Near East, October–December 1956.

Royal Navy

- Major Anthony Patrick Willasey-Wilsey, MBE, 40 Commando, Royal Marines.
- Captain Michael Anthony Higham Marston, 40 Commando, Royal Marines.
- Lieutenant Stuart Lawrence Syrad, 45 Commando, Royal Marines.

Army

- Major Richard Guise Stevens (114091), The Somerset Light Infantry (Prince Albert's).
- Captain John Malcolm Elliott (443783), Royal Army Medical Corps.

==== Bar to the Military Cross ====
- Major Dennis Leolin Samuel St. Maur Aldridge, MBE, MC, 42 Commando, Royal Marines.

=== Distinguished Conduct Medal (DCM) ===
In recognition of gallant and distinguished services in the Operations in the Near East, October–December 1956.

- Corporal Douglas Edward Mant, Po.X.2992, 40 Commando, Royal Marines.

=== Air Force Cross (AFC) ===
- Wing Commander William Hoy, DFC (33469).
- Wing Commander Kenneth Gilbert Hubbard, OBE, DFC (66539).
- Wing Commander Ronald Albert Jell, DFC (64283).
- Squadron Leader Peter Portway Baker (57528).
- Squadron Leader, Alan Henry Chamberlain (137417).
- Squadron Leader Leslie De Garis (58129).
- Squadron Leader John Reginald Dowling, DFC (150185).
- Squadron Leader John Desmond Foster (575492).
- Squadron Leader Athol Gordon McIntyre (36257).
- Squadron Leader Stephen Arnold Nunns, DFC (179592).
- Squadron Leader Robert Greenwood Wilson, DFC (125601).
- Squadron Leader William Francis Young (49308).
- Flight Lieutenant Kenneth Bown (163363), Royal Auxiliary Air Force.
- Flight Lieutenant Ernest Charles Donoghue (168391).
- Flight Lieutenant John Gladstone (574092).
- Flight Lieutenant Kenneth Joseph Goodwin (2238526).
- Flight Lieutenant Thomas John Hardie (582608).
- Right Lieutenant Tadeusz Hemsley (501627).
- Flight Lieutenant Eric John Hood (582570).
- Flight Lieutenant Brunon Jerzy Kudrewicz (501903).
- Flight Lieutenant Edward Laraway (56780).
- Flight Lieutenant Raymond George Lofting (159038).
- Flight Lieutenant Henry Alan Merriman (31084 Q3).
- Flight Lieutenant John Willoughby Moore (576961).
- Flight Lieutenant Raymond Henry John Myhill (165853).
- Flight Lieutenant Edward Comer Rigg (58563).
- Flight Lieutenant John Ross (1569903).
- Flight Lieutenant James Turnbull Wallace (171761).
- Flight Lieutenant Alan Washbrook, DFC (157197).
- Flight Lieutenant Geoffrey Crichton Wilkinson (4034678).
- Flying Officer Robert Leslie Beeson (4102751).
- Flying Officer Alexander Mill Ford, AFM (1569796).
- Master Pilot Douglas James Scott (1393166).

In recognition of gallant and distinguished services in the Operations in the Near East, October–December 1956.

- Flight Lieutenant James Albert King, DSO, DFC (45734).

=== Distinguished Service Medal (DSM) ===
In recognition of gallant and distinguished services in the Operations in the Near East, October–December 1956.

- Leading Seaman Thomas Dyer, P/JX.163578, HMS Newfoundland.
- Able Seaman Roy Joseph Loader, D/J.X.912011, HMS Crane.

=== Military Medal (MM) ===
In recognition of gallant and distinguished services in the Operations in the Near East, October–December 1956.

Royal Navy

- Quartermaster Sergeant George Desmond Buttery, Po.X.4096, 40 Commando, Royal Marines.
- Corporal Michael Edward Mead, RM.11157, 45 Commando, Royal Marines.
- Marine James Willie Crossland, RM.14422, 40 Commando, Royal Marines.
- Marine David Kelly Davidson, RM.14644, 45 Commando, Royal Marines.

Army

- 23210200 Sergeant (acting) Robert Rokeby Graham Read, The Parachute Regiment.
- 23202389 Corporal Roger Kenny, The Parachute Regiment.
- 23253519 Lance Corporal (acting) Leslie George Howe, The Parachute Regiment.

=== Air Force Medal (AFM) ===
- 1607856 Flight Sergeant Peter Boniface.
- 1089072 Flight Sergeant Frederick Hodges Tate.
- 579681 Flight Sergeant Peter Ernest John White.
- 4010887 Sergeant Malcolm Kirkland Briggs.
- 4027214 Sergeant Eric Charles Ward.

=== Queen's Commendation for Valuable Service in the Air ===
Royal Air Force

- Wing Commander Alexander McKay Sinclair Steedman, DFC (123469).
- Squadron Leader Maurice Adams (201980).
- Squadron Leader Miloslav Jan Mansfeld, DSO, DFC, AFC (69453).
- Squadron Leader Brian Louis Partridge (150052).
- Squadron Leader David Freeland Cliff Ross (55238).
- Squadron Leader Patrick Dennis Collins Street, DSC (501011).
- Flight Lieutenant Raymond John Bannard (4034253).
- Flight Lieutenant Ronald Julian Moss Baron, MBE (201363).
- Flight Lieutenant Louis George Cockerill (583015).
- Flight Lieutenant Victor William Edwin Colwell (1339588).
- Flight Lieutenant Eric Connell (189949).
- Flight Lieutenant Kenneth Fanthorpe (193198).
- Flight Lieutenant Idris Hedley Grant (172598).
- Flight Lieutenant Robert Thornton Jones (172453).
- Flight Lieutenant Jack Loat (41189).
- Flight Lieutenant Jack Stearn McWicker, AFM (1621355).
- Flight Lieutenant George William Marshall (178542), Royal Auxiliary Air Force.
- Flight Lieutenant Sydney John Marshall (180122).
- Flight Lieutenant Francis William Gordon Meadows (181428).
- Flight Lieutenant Erroll Minter, MBE, AFC (201177).
- Flight Lieutenant James Primrose (502116).
- Flight Lieutenant Eric Edward Reeves (3110035).
- Flight Lieutenant Roy Joseph Skinner (1605715).
- Flight Lieutenant Arthur Cedric Thornton (173794).
- Flight Lieutenant Derek William Wood (3045975).
- Flight Lieutenant William Brook Charles Young (188708).
- Flying Officer George Ballingall (2683570), Royal Auxiliary Air Force.
- Flying Officer Arthur George Barnes (3129286), Royal Auxiliary Air Force.
- Flying Officer James Grade Millar (3213038).
- Flying Officer Michael Raymond Nash (4089003).
- Flying Officer Richard John Kinsman Nicholas (578612).
- Flying Officer John Cameron Robertson (2600196), Royal Auxiliary Air Force.
- Pilot Officer Kenneth Ernest Appleford (1608448).
- Master Pilot Robert Arnold Howell (1321298).
- Master Pilot Frederick John Loveridge, AFM (1322449).
- Master Engineer Alexander Duffus Kelman (573712).
- Master Signaller Louis Hemming (1214348).
- Master Signaller Denis Harold Smith (553911).
- 3110201 Sergeant William Angus Beveridge.

United Kingdom

- Captain William Atkins, Training Captain, 802 Flight, British European Airways.
- Dane Henry Donaldson, Flight Engineer Officer, Stratocruiser Fleet, British Overseas Airways Corporation.
- Captain Ernest James Newton Hengle, Route Check Captain, Constellation Fleet, British Overseas Airways Corporation.
- Thomas Clifford Rogers, Deputy Flight Radio Officer, Viscount Flight, British European Airways.
- Captain Frank Arthur Taylor, Flight Captain, Britannia Fleet, British Overseas Airways Corporation.

=== Queen's Police Medal ===
England and Wales

- Alfred Frederick Wilcox, OBE, Chief Constable, Hertfordshire Constabulary.
- Thomas Rae Gaylor, Assistant Chief Constable, Worcestershire Constabulary.
- Henry Thomas Ozier Lovell, Assistant Chief Constable, Dorset Constabulary.
- Arthur Johnston, Chief Superintendent, West Riding Constabulary.
- Leslie Percy Blewett, Superintendent, Cornwall Constabulary.
- Walter William Hunt, Superintendent (Grade I), Swansea Borough Police.
- Cyril Edward Hamor Hirst, Superintendent & Deputy Chief Constable, Stockport Borough Police.
- Eric Bentley Brereton, Superintendent, Staffordshire Constabulary.
- Philip Edward Munt, MM, Superintendent (Grade I), Metropolitan Police.
- Eric Edward Lacey, Detective Superintendent, Leicester City Police.
- John Pretsell Jamieson, Detective Superintendent (Grade I), Metropolitan Police.
- Charles Smith Strath, Superintendent (Grade I), Metropolitan Police.

Scotland

- Thomas Whitson, Superintendent, Lothians & Peebles Constabulary.
- Robert Gall, Superintendent, Lanarkshire Constabulary.

Northern Ireland

- Michael John Brennan, Head Constable, Royal Ulster Constabulary.

Southern Rhodesia

- Lieutenant-Colonel Robert Hugh Borland, Senior Assistant Commissioner of the British South Africa Police.

Overseas Territories

- Reginald Harcourt Stewart, Commissioner of Police, Aden.
- Henry Wylde Edwards Heath, Assistant Commissioner of Police, Hong Kong.
- Patrick Gronow Davis, Senior Superintendent of Police, Kenya.
- Claude Henry Fenner, MBE, Senior Assistant Commissioner of Police, Federation of Malaya.
- Mohammed din bin Mohammed Shariff, Acting Senior Assistant Commissioner of Police, Federation of Malaya.
- Harvey Theodore Blackburne Ryves, Senior Assistant Commissioner of Police, Federation of Malaya.
- Charles Neville Halse, Assistant Commissioner of Police, Northern Rhodesia.
- John William Chilton, Superintendent of Police, Singapore.
- Eric John Linsell, Superintendent of Police, Singapore.
- Andrew Howat Frew, Superintendent of Police, Singapore.
- Sham Pak Ying, Station Officer, Hong Kong Fire Brigade.
- Paul Aksman Glosz, Superintendent, Perak State Fire Services, Federation of Malaya.
- John Parker, Chief Officer, Lagos Fire Brigade, Federation of Nigeria.

=== Queen's Fire Services Medal ===
England and Wales

- Thomas Stott Harrison, Chief Officer, Southend-on-Sea Fire Brigade.
- Robert Todd, Chief Officer, Carlisle Fire Brigade.
- David John Envies, Chief Officer, Merthyr Tydfil Fire Brigade.
- Albert Lloyd, Divisional Officer, Lancashire Fire Brigade.

Scotland

- William Robertson, MBE, Divisional Officer, South Eastern Area Fire Brigade.

Australia

- Harold James Cooksley, Moree Volunteer Fire Brigade, New South Wales.

Overseas Territories

- Socrates Charalambous, Sub-Inspector, Cyprus Police Fire Brigade.
- Frederick Morphet Watson, Station Officer, Hong Kong Fire Brigade.

=== Colonial Police Medal ===
Southern Rhodesia

- Captain John Nicholas Botha, British South Africa Police.
- Bwalya, First Class Sergeant, British South Africa Police.
- Chiota, Station Sergeant, British South Africa Police.
- Captain John Hunter, British South Africa Police.
- Cecil Mendham Ludlow, Chief Inspector, British South Africa Police.
- Mikote, Detective Station Sergeant, British South Africa Police.
- Edward Abraham Oppenheim, Detective Chief Inspector, British South Africa Police.
- John William Peck, Superintendent, British South Africa Police.
- John Sydney Rudd, Staff Chief Inspector, British South Africa Police.
- William McCall-Smith, Chief Inspector, British South Africa Police.

Bechuanaland

- Robert Manisa, BEM, Regimental Sergeant Major, Bechuanaland Protectorate Police Force.

Swaziland

- Captain Lewis Maxwell Cooper, Swaziland Police Force.
- Captain Edward Benton Goodwill Holmes, Swaziland Police Force.

Overseas Territories

- Maurice Kenneth Akker, Senior Superintendent, Kenya Police Force.
- Alwi bin Yusof, Detective Sergeant Major, Federation of Malaya Police Force.
- Fred Nwanegbo Daniel Anughere, Assistant Superintendent, Nigeria Police Force.
- John Frederick Barton, Deputy Commissioner, Gibraltar Police Force.
- Ronald Eteen Bliss, Lieutenant, Federation of Malaya Police Force.
- Patrick Michael Brodie, Assistant Superintendent, Federation of Malaya Police Force.
- John Mitchell Brown, Inspector, Bermuda Police Force.
- Chan Ah Chan, Assistant Superintendent, Federation of Malaya Police Force.
- Chan Ching, Detective Sergeant, Federation of Malaya Police Force.
- Fakir Chand s/o Diwan Chand, Assistant Superintendent, Federation of Malaya Police Force.
- David Austin Lisle Chase, Superintendent, Jamaica Constabulary.
- William Cheng, Assistant Superintendent, Singapore Police Force.
- Cheong Yong Nghee, Detective Sub-Inspector, Singapore Police Force.
- Jack Colclough, Superintendent, Fiji Police Force.
- Alan Arthur Dear, Senior Superintendent, Nigeria Police Force.
- John Dodd, Assistant Superintendent, Northern Rhodesia Police Force.
- Joseph Stuart Espey, Superintendent, Northern Rhodesia Police Force.
- Denis Joseph Forde, Superintendent, Northern Rhodesia Police Force.
- Charles Hugh Fraser, Sergeant, Cyprus Police Force.
- Abdul Hakim, Sub-Inspector, Singapore Police Force.
- Luke Hannon, Superintendent, Cyprus Police Force.
- Hassan Houloussi, Sergeant, Cyprus Police Force.
- Roland Archer Howse, Senior Superintendent, Nigeria Police Force.
- Ibrahim bin Abu Bakar, Senior Inspector, Federation of Malaya Police Force.
- Ibrahim bin Murad, Chief Inspector, Federation of Malaya Police Force.
- Ibrahim bin Salleh, Sergeant Major, Federation of Malaya Police Force.
- Ben Ilojiole, Sergeant Major, Nigeria Police Force.
- Enrol Duncan Jameison, Acting Chief Inspector, Kenya Police Force.
- Jantan bin Derus, Sergeant, Federation of Malaya Police Force.
- George Westerby Jarvis, Inspector, Leeward Islands Police Force. Chief Instructor, Regional Police Training School, Barbados.
- Arthur Bert Jefferies, Deputy Superintendent, Federation of Malaya Police Force.
- Harold Daniel Kemp, Lieutenant, Federation of Malaya Police Force.
- Roshan Khan, Staff Sergeant Class II, Hong Kong Police Force.
- Kilundo s/o Ituma, Sergeant, Kenya Police Force.
- Vernon Ewart Kirkland, District Commandant, Kenya Police Reserve.
- Erukana Kazibwe Kironjdozi, Inspector, Grade I, Kenya Police Force.
- Lat bin Mehat, Corporal, Federation of Malaya Special Constabulary.
- Arthur Henry Lawton, Assistant Superintendent, Kenya Police Force.
- Percival Scott Leathart, Deputy Superintendent, Singapore Police Force.
- Leslie William Leigh, Superintendent, Sierra Leone Police Force.
- Loke Yew Seng, Inspector, Federation of Malaya Police Force.
- Nemani Lutu, Sergeant, Fiji Police Force.
- George Bernard McCaffery, Superintendent, Nigeria Police Force, now Deputy Commissioner, Mauritius Police Force.
- Murdoch Mackenzie, Superintendent, Kenya Police Force.
- William Duncan Maclean, Superintendent, Federation of Malaya Police Force.
- Houssein Mehmed, Inspector, Cyprus Police Force.
- Nicolas Michael Mezos, Superintendent, Cyprus Police Force.
- Charles Terence Miller, Assistant Superintendent, Federation of Malaya Police Force.
- Simion M'Mutunga M'Mugambi, Assistant Inspector, Kenya Police Force.
- Alexander Morrison, Superintendent, Hong Kong Police Force.
- Wilfred Gathiome Njonge, Inspector, Grade I, Kenya Police Force.
- Hugh Joseph Nolan, Superintendent, Nyasaland Police Force.
- Peter Oduko, Inspector, Grade II, Nigeria Police Force.
- Ambrozio Oracha, Head Constable, Uganda Police Force.
- Pawanteh bin Haji Mohamed, Station Officer, Province Wellesley Fire Brigade, Federation of Malaya.
- William Perreira, Sergeant, British Guiana Police Force.
- Paul Perrier, Superintendent, Mauritius Police Force.
- Ralph Montague Rokeby Price, Deputy Superintendent, British Honduras Police Force.
- Thomas Joseph Pritlove, Superintendent, Nigeria Police Force.
- Ali Radji, Assistant Superintendent, Cyprus Police Force.
- Abdul Rahim bin Long, Sergeant, Federation of Malaya Police Force.
- Aibdul Rahman bin Hashim, Deputy Superintendent, Federation of Malaya Police Force.
- Ibrahim Ramazan, Chief Inspector, Aden Police Force.
- Abdul Ranee bin Mohammed Yunoos, Assistant Superintendent, Federation of Malaya Police Force.
- Frank Roberts, Chief Inspector, Hong Kong Police Force.
- Paul William Eyton Ryland, Senior Superintendent, Uganda Police Force.
- Gurmukh Singh s/o Mit Singh, Inspector, Federation of Malaya Police Force.
- Hernam Singh s/o Sher Singh, Inspector, Federation of Malaya Police Force.
- Mokhtiar Singh s/o Sudagar Singh, Temporary Inspector, Federation of Malaya Special Constabulary.
- Sarwan Singh, Assistant Superintendent, Tanganyika Police Force.
- Eustace Peter Heriz-Smith, Senior Superintendent, Kenya Police Force.
- Daniel Socratous, Sergeant, Cyprus Police Fire Brigade.
- John Derek Sowerby, Assistant Superintendent, Federation of Malaya Police Force.
- Sulaiman bin Raisin, Sergeant, Federation of Malaya Special Constabulary.
- Keith Roy Sutcliffe, BEM, Acting Superintendent, Federation of Malaya Police Force.
- David Tan Teck Khim, Assistant Superintendent, Singapore Police Force.
- Thamby bin Yusop, Detective Sub-Inspector, Singapore Police Force.
- Archibald Francis Thomson, Superintendent, Cyprus Police Force.
- Alastair Gunn Turnbull, Senior Superintendent, Cyprus Police Force.
- Alagasundram Vythilingam, Detective Sergeant, Federation of Malaya Police Force.
- Rolandde Lacey Wheeler, Assistant Commissioner, Sierra Leone Police Force.
- Norman Peter Widdowson, Assistant Superintendent, Tanganyika Police Force.
- Harold Wright, Assistant Superintendent, Cyprus Police Force.
- Yoong Siew Wah, Inspector, Singapore Police Force.

=== Mention in Despatches ===
In recognition of gallant and distinguished services in the Operations in the Near East, October–December 1956.
Royal Navy

- Captain John Graham Hamilton, HMS Newfoundland.
- Commander Ian David Mclaughlan, DSC, HMS Chevron.
- Lieutenant-Commander Peter Everard Bailey, HMS Eagle.
- Lieutenant-Commander Arthur Bernard Bruce Clark, 899 Royal Naval Air Squadron.
- Lieutenant Commander Derek Arthur Fuller, 849 Royal Naval Air Squadron.
- Lieutenant-Commander Brian Haviland Harriss, HMS Albion.
- Lieutenant-Commander Antony Herbert Lane Harvey, DSC, HMS Bastion.
- Lieutenant-Commander Timothy Francis Hegarty, HMS Crane.
- Lieutenant-Commander John Claud Jacob, 845 Royal Naval Air Squadron.
- Lieutenant-Commander Randal von Tempsky Bernau Kettle, 804 Royal Naval Air Squadron.
- Lieutenant-Commander David Thomas McKeown, 802 Royal Naval Air Squadron.
- Lieutenant-Commander Malcolm Harold James Petrie, 892 Royal Naval Air Squadron.
- Lieutenant-Commander Alfred Raymond Rawbone, AFC, 897 Royal Naval Air Squadron.
- Lieutenant-Commander John Desmond Russell, 800 Royal Naval Air Squadron.
- Lieutenant-Commander Ronald Arthur Shilcock, 809 Royal Naval Air Squadron.
- Lieutenant-Commander James Henry Summerlee, HMS Eagle.
- Lieutenant-Commander Maurice Arthur Tibby, 800 Royal Naval Air Squadron.
- Lieutenant-Commander Kenneth Alan Williams, HMS Portcullis.
- Lieutenant Ian Bruce Lennox, HMS Sallyport.
- Lieutenant Harry Parker, HMS Lofoten.
- Surgeon Lieutenant John Gwyther Bradford, MB, BS, 45 Commando, Royal Marines.
- Acting Surgeon Lieutenant Peter Gordon Harries, MB, BS, HMS Diana
- Sub-Lieutenant (SD) Frank Alexander Jupp, HMS Newfoundland.
- Lieutenant-Colonel Peter Lawrence Norcock, OBE, 42 Commando, Royal Marines.
- Lieutenant-Colonel Norman Hastings Tailyour, DSO, 45 Commando, Royal Marines.
- Major Richard Dennis Crombie, 45 Commando, Royal Marines.
- Captain Hamish Brian Emslie, MC, 42 Commando, Royal Marines.
- Captain Jesse Hotchkiss Haycock, 45 Commando, Royal Marines.
- Captain Richard Francis Gerard Meadows, MBE, 45 Commando, Royal Marines.
- Captain Frederick Roy Sillitoe, 42 Commando, Royal Marines.
- Lieutenant (Local Captain) Terrance John Wills, 42 Commando, Royal Marines.
- Lieutenant Rudolph Douglas Edwards, 40 Commando, Royal Marines.
- Lieutenant Timothy John Michael Wilson, 40 Commando, Royal Marines.
- Acting Lieutenant Anthony William Richardson, 45 Commando, Royal Marines.
- Acting Lieutenant Alistair Dunlop Rodger, Royal Marines, HMS Striker.
- Chief Petty Officer Robert Alec Cokes, P/JX.151267, HMS Chaplet.
- Chief Petty Officer Telegraphist William Heron Chisholm, DSM, C/JX.142524, HMS Jamaica.
- Chief Engine Room Artificer John James Seymour, P/MX.52269, HMS Chaplet.
- Chief Engine Room Artificer Sidney George Ward, P/MX.56545, HMS Woodbridge Haven.
- Chief Engineering Mechanic Charles James Salmon, P/KX.91789, HMS Newfoundland.
- Chief Electrician Gordon Enderson Morris, D/MX.856466, HMS Eagle.
- Chief Radio Electrical Artificer George Haslam Whittaker, P/MX.715767, HMS Duchess.
- Chief Aircraft Artificer Charles Henry Berry, L/FX.75018, 892 Royal Naval Air Squadron.
- Chief Aircraft Artificer Leonard Carter, L/FX.87518, 895 Royal Naval Air Squadron.
- Chief Aircraft Artificer Francis Newton Davis, L/FX.76919, 804 Royal Naval Air Squadron.
- Chief Aircraft Artificer Patrick Joseph Foley, L/FX.766096, 802 Royal Naval Air Squadron.
- Chief Aircraft Artificer Hugh Charles Cecil Huzzey, L/FX.76704, 810 Royal Naval Air Squadron.
- Chief Airman Charles Henry French, L/FX.857897, HMS Eagle.
- Aircraft Artificer (O) 1st Class Dennis Harbin, L/FX.935430, 895 Royal Naval Air Squadron.
- Chief Aircraft Mechanician Reginald Arthur Wilson, L/FX.75690, 800 Royal Naval Air Squadron.
- Sick Berth Chief Petty Officer Joseph Windsor Bennett, P/MX.53428, HMS Theseus.
- Sick Berth Chief Petty Officer Thomas Arthur Grundy, D/MX.49569, HMS Ocean.
- Chief Petty Officer Cook (S) Claude Henry Bell, P/MX.52864, HMS Albion.
- Master-at-Arms Albert Charles Nicholls, JP/MX.716378, HMS Tyne.
- Petty Officer Clifford James, P/JX.801647, HMS Duchess.
- Yeoman of Signals George Thomas Warren Ryrie, D/JX.156879, HMS Manxman.
- Petty Officer Telegraphist Ronald Joseph Garrad, P/JX.712711, HMS Newfoundland.
- Petty Officer Writer Bernard Thompson, C/MX.849428.
- Leading Airman Kenneth Edward Gammer, L/FX.906108, HMS Eagle.
- Leading Airman George James Henry Hazel, L/FX.886965, HMS Eagle.
- Leading Sick Berth Attendant Terence Francis Jennings, D/MX.896612, HMS Crane.
- Naval Airman 1st Class Anthony Brian Webster, L/FX.917498, HMS Eagle.
- Sick Berth Attendant Brian Anthony Greenacre, D/MX.923667, HMS Eagle.
- Sick Berth Attendant Stanley George Lindfield, P/M.932119, HMS Newfoundland.
- Sergeant John Henry Howarth, Ply.X.5512, Royal Marines, HMS Striker.
- Sergeant Arthur Thomas George Peck, Ch.X.5357, 40 Commando, Royal Marines.
- Sergeant Ernest James Sim, Ch.X.4768, 45 Commando, Royal Marines.
- Corporal Peter Shand Young, RM.9957, 42 Commando, Royal Marines.
- Marine John Albert Windsor Cox, RM.15050, 40 Commando, Royal Marines.
- Marine Alan William Middleton, Po.X.6406, 42 Commando, Royal Marines.
- Marine Ronald Frederick Saggers, Po.X.6552, 42 Commando, Royal Marines.

Army

Commands and Staff

- Major-General D.H.V. Buckle, CB, CBE (27504), late Royal Army Service Corps.
- Major-General J.B. Churcher, CB, DSO (31905), late Infantry.
- Major-General R.G.S. Hobbs, CB, DSO, OBE (40387), late Royal Artillery.
- Major-General A.E. Morrison, CB, OBE (17226), late Royal Signals, now RARO.
- Brigadier F.L. Saunders, OBE, ADC (36860), late Royal Army Service Corps.
- Brigadier M.C.A. Henniker, CBE, DSO, MC (34456), late Royal Engineers.
- Brigadier F. Stephens, DSO (33782), late Infantry.
- Brigadier (Temporary) J.W. Wainwright (40414), late Royal Artillery.
- Brigadier (Temporary) C.M.F. Deakin, CBE (49812), late Grenadier Guards.
- Colonel M.St.J. Oswald, DSO, MC (52667), late Royal Artillery.

12th Royal Lancers

- Lieutenant H.I. Meynell (420885).

Royal Tank Regiment

- Captain (Temporary) P.S. Berry, DFC (414804).
- 22241579 Sergeant (acting) A.A. Roberts.
- 22429377 Sergeant (acting) J.W.H. Fisher.

Royal Regiment of Artillery

- Lieutenant-Colonel G.N. Prideaux, OBE (70768).
- Colonel (Temporary) H.C.R. Gillman, MBE (50801).
- Major J.S. Humphrey, MBE (74530).
- Major J.A. Ward (105874).
- Lieutenant-Colonel (Temporary) J.F.T. Scott, TD (65588).

Corps of Royal Engineers

- Brigadier (Temporary) W.E. Farley, CBE, ERD (77236).
- Lieutenant-Colonel D.M. Fletcher, ERD (75412).
- Lieutenant-Colonel (Temporary) R. Haley (288498).
- Lieutenant-Colonel (Temporary) G. Williams, OBE (191108).
- Major A.F. Leslie, MBE (125178).
- Captain (Temporary) F.J. Gibson (422106).
- Second Lieutenant G.R. Owens (447362).
- 814492 Warrant Officer Class II E.J. Willis.
- 14464456 Warrant Officer Class II (acting) J.M. Wilson.
- 23168753 Corporal (acting) C. Milligan.

Royal Corps of Signals

- Major R.S. Holbrook (228678).
- Captain M.R. Ridler (303151).
- Lieutenant W.R. Hefferon (438688).
- 23182364 Sergeant (acting) J.M. Bate.

Scots Guards

- Captain M.P.J. Deklee (370059).
- 2696222 Warrant Officer Class I (acting) A. Young.

The Royal Scots (The Royal Regiment)

- Lieutenant-Colonel W.T. Campbell, CBE (58085).

The East Yorkshire Regiment (The Duke of York's Own)

- Major R.S.MacG. Laird, MBE (69125).

The Royal Welch Fusiliers

- Major T.W. Whittaker (70980) (Attached HQ 3 Commando Brigade).

The Border Regiment

- Major R.H. Stewart, MC (67798).
- Lieutenant P.J. Butterworth (430253).

The South Staffordshire Regiment

- Major A.H. Staughton, ERD (53517).

The Black Watch (Royal Highland Regiment)

- Major W.M. Wingate Gray (172297).

The Queen's Own Royal West Kent Regiment

- Major R.K. Dowse (77299).
- Captain E.C.S. Osborne (308442).
- Lieutenant (Temporary Captain) M.R.M. Newall (426964).

The Manchester Regiment

- Major G.D. Gill, MBE (88029).
- Major C.G. Easthaugh (220396).

The North Staffordshire Regiment (The Prince of Wales's)

- Lieutenant-Colonel (Temporary) W.C.G. Rogers, MC (64635).

The Durham Light Infantry

- Lieutenant (Temporary Captain) W.B. Hill (426910).

The Argyll and Sutherland Highlanders (Princess Louise's)

- 22795408 Lance-Corporal J. Armour.

The Parachute Regiment

- 14466161 Sergeant R.D. Wright.
- 22790306 Corporal A.O. Bevan.
- 22980990 Lance-Corporal N.C.H. Thompson.
- 23462292 Lance-Corporal (acting) M.F. Lampard.
- 23181848 Private J. Feeney.
- 23245237 Private R. Moore.
- 23256062 Private P.R. Clements.

The Rifle Brigade (Prince Consort's Own)

- Major (Temporary) R.E. Worsley (240132).

Royal Army Service Corps

- Brevet Lieutenant-Colonel W.A. Smallman, MBE (93086).
- S/57378 Warrant Officer Class I G. Sharpe.
- 22234694 Staff Sergeant J. Jansen.
- S/22701001 Lance-Corporal. L. Moss.
- S/22956862 Lance-Corporal. G.S. Scaife.

Royal Army Medical Corps

- 22258694 Sergeant L. Goodall (Attached 3rd Parachute Battalion).

Women's Royal Army Corps

- W/329758 Warrant Officer Class I (acting) M.F. Cullen.

General List

- Colonel (Temporary) G.E.T.H. Evans, OBE, MC (425156).

Royal Air Force

- Air Vice-Marshal William Joseph Crisham, CB, CBE.
- Air Vice-Marshal Edmund Cuthbert Hudleston, CB, CBE.
- Air Vice-Marshal John Noel Tracy Stephenson, CB, CBE.
- Group Captain Oliver Russell Donaldson, CBE, DSO, DFC, (Retd.)
- Group Captain Douglas Hamilton Myles Graham, OBE.
- Group Captain Harry Joseph Hickey, OBE.
- Wing Commander Robert Neil Greig Allen, DFC (63484).
- Wing Commander John Ellis, OBE, DFC (37850).
- Wing Commander Michael Geoffrey Lisle Foster, AFC (90007).
- Wing Commander Desmond Ernest Hawkins, DFC (40700).
- Wing Commander Freeman Marshall Osborn, OBE, DFC, AFC (44734).
- Wing Commander Alan Paul Harold Slogrove (31296).
- Wing Commander Mervyn John Underbill (44585).
- Acting Wing Commander Peter Charles Ellis, DFC (126648).
- Acting Wing Commander John Watson Foster, DFC, AFC (134757).
- Acting Wing Commander John Eric Peter Thompson, AFC (77794).
- Squadron Leader David Bernard Delany, AFC (63472).
- Squadron Leader Bernard Leslie Goult (52144).
- Squadron Leader Valentine Harold Hemming (140930).
- Squadron Leader Eric George Holmes (138623).
- Squadron Leader Basil Victor Hunter (106222).
- Squadron Leader Dudley Charles Jones, DFC (177473).
- Squadron Leader Roy Sydney Perry, DFC (101557).
- Squadron Leader Herbert Crawshaw Scott (49224).
- Squadron Leader Kenneth John Tabor (168499).
- Squadron Leader William Henry Wheeler, MBE (52873).
- Flight Lieutenant Brian Geoffrey Greenbank (45450).
- Flight Lieutenant Edward Rupert Somers Joce, MBE (43215), [Deceased].
- Flight Lieutenant Stanley Jeffrey Bates Roe (169207).
- Flight Lieutenant Cyril Rosewall (48872).
- Flight Lieutenant George Shaw (50240).
- Flying Officer Andrew Stewart McNeil Douglas (4082588).
- Flying Officer Roy John Grainge (504285).
- Flying Officer William Samuel Holmes (550413).
- Warrant Officer Charles George Bailey (521159).
- Warrant Officer John Henry Fairfield Duncan (567139).
- Warrant Officer Frank Reginald Harold Seal (568857).
- Warrant Officer Alan George Ward (525462).
- 568820 Flight Sergeant Jack Stanley George Bainton.
- 572240 Flight Sergeant Charles Bohan Browne.
- 1566622 Flight Sergeant James Gumming, DFC.
- 591139 Flight Sergeant Wallace Findlay.
- 638835 Flight Sergeant Richard Kenyon.
- 535297 Flight Sergeant Frederick Knox.
- 574737 Chief Technician William Douglas Campion.
- 519959 Chief Technician Charles Frederick Gardiner.
- 521175 Acting Flight Sergeant Brynmor Lewis.
- 993837 Acting Flight Sergeant George Ross.
- 1155237 Sergeant Thomas William Bailey.
- 4010335 Sergeant Harry Frederick Ballam, RAF Regiment.
- 3110107 Sergeant Norman Charles Biddiscombe.
- 1873840 Sergeant Donald William Birchley.
- 577770 Sergeant Percy Eric Chaplin.
- 653290 Sergeant John Cussins.
- 517036 Sergeant Charles Robert Kaven.
- 540286 Sergeant James Clarence Hall Lee.
- 2283772 Sergeant Thomas William Luke.
- 3045964 Sergeant John Edward Lycett.
- 1797400 Sergeant Patrick Matthews.
- 624560 Sergeant John Millar.
- 569084 Sergeant Charles Alfred Townsend.
- 1237772 Senior Technician Hubert Ernest Wallis.
- 588081 Corpora] Anthony Peter Miller.
- 4199901 Acting Corporal Robert Brown.

== Australia ==
=== Knight Bachelor ===
- Harold Alfred Maurice Campbell, CMG, MM, of East Melbourne, Victoria. For services to Journalism.
- Kenneth Frank Coles, of Bellevue Hill, New South Wales. For public and charitable services.
- William Ernest Dunk, CBE, Chairman of the Commonwealth Public Service Board.

=== Order of the Bath ===
==== Companion of the Order of the Bath (CB) ====
Military Division

- Lieutenant-General Alwyn Ragnar Garrett, CBE (2/10), Australian Staff Corps.

=== Order of Saint Michael and Saint George ===
==== Knight Commander of the Order of St Michael and St George (KCMG) ====
- Senator the Honourable Alister Maxwell McMullin, President of the Senate.

==== Companion of the Order of St Michael and St George (CMG) ====
- Sidney Powell, of Hawthorn, South Australia. For services to Australian Commerce and Industry.
- Francis Seymour Vine, of Toorak, Victoria. For services to the Australian manufacturing industry.
- George Percival Norman Watt, CBE, of Burwood, Victoria. For services to Australian civil aviation.

=== Order of the British Empire ===
==== Knight Commander of the Order of the British Empire (KBE) ====
Civil Division

- Major-General Frank Kingsley Norris, CB, CBE, ISO, ED, MD, of Upper Hawthorn, Victoria. For services to Medicine.

==== Dame Commander of the Order of the British Empire (DBE) ====
Civil Division

- Senator Annabelle Jane Mary Rankin, Government Whip in the Senate since 1951. For political and public services.

==== Commander of the Order of the British Empire (CBE) ====
Military Division

- Rear-Admiral Wilfred Hastings Harrington, DSO, Royal Australian Navy.
- Brigadier Jack Lowell Amies, OBE, ED (1/21001), Royal Australian Infantry Corps.
- Acting Air Vice-Marshal Charles Douglas Candy, OBE, Royal Australian Air Force.

Civil Division

- Richard Allingham, of Coltesloe, Western Australia, in recognition of his outstanding community service.
- The Very Reverend Julian Ralph Blanchard, formerly Moderator-General of the Presbyterian Church of Australia.
- Henry Armand Bland, Secretary, Department of Labour and National Service.
- The Right Reverend John Frewer, Bishop of North-West Australia.
- Brigadier Warren D'Arcy McDonald, Chairman of the Australian National Airlines Commission.
- Francis Alexander O'Connor, OBE, Secretary, Department of Supply.

==== Officer of the Order of the British Empire (OBE) ====
Military Division

- Acting Commander Frederick Ross James, Royal Australian Navy.
- Lieutenant-Colonel Duncan Lindsay Beresford Goslett, MC, ED (2/40000), Australian Staff Corps.
- Lieutenant-Colonel Louis Edward Longworth, ED (3/123203), Royal Australian Artillery.
- Lieutenant-Colonel Walter William McLellan, (3/136), Royal Australian Army Medical Corps.
- Group Captain Charles Carwardine Probert, Royal Australian Air Force.
- Wing Officer Doris Jessie Carter (W35397), Women's Royal Australian Air Force.

Civil Division

- Brigadier Frederick Oliver Chilton, DSO, Deputy Secretary, Department of Defence.
- Leonard Brockenshire Curnow, of Caulfield, Victoria. For services to amateur sport.
- Sydney Broadway Grange, of Balgowlah, New South Wales, in recognition of his valuable contribution to amateur sport.
- Ivor Roy Ian Hanger, General Secretary, Young Men’s Christian Association, Perth, Western Australia.
- Manuel Richard Hornibrook, of Newstead, Queensland. For contributions to the practice and science of building in Australia.
- Walter Noakes, MM. President of the Farmers' Union of Western Australia.
- John Paul Quinn, Head of the Defence Liaison Branch, Department of External Affairs.
- George Ronald Richards, Deputy Director-General (Operations), Australian Security Intelligence Organisation.
- Cuthbert Sowerby Ruston, of Renmark, South Australia. For his contribution to the development of the South Australian Upper Murray areas.
- Edgar Harry Short, Chairman of the North Queensland Tobacco Growers Cooperative.
- George William Francis Smith, President of the High Council, Commonwealth Public Service Organisations.
- Mervyn Richard Charles Stradwick, Assistant Director-General (Telecommunications), Postmaster-General's Department.
- Robert Harley Wainwright, President, New Settlers' League, Queensland.
- Reginald Horton Wallman, of Adelaide, South Australia. For services to amateur sport, particularly rowing.
- Wilfred Alan Westerman, First Assistant Secretary, Department of Trade.

==== Member of the Order of the British Empire (MBE) ====
Military Division

- Bandmaster Lieutenant-Commander George Hooker, Royal Australian Navy.
- Captain William David Benson (5/34619), Royal Corps of Australian Electrical and Mechanical Engineers.
- Major Robert Geoffrey Cronk, MC (3/37544), Australian Staff Corps.
- 5/125 Warrant Officer Class II George Henry Gibson, Royal Australian Army Ordnance Corps.
- Captain (temporary) Frank George Hoeter (1/39440), Royal Australian Infantry Corps.
- 3/2326 Warrant Officer Class I William Arthur Hoskins, Royal Australian Army Provost Corps.
- Major (Quartermaster) Albert John Lyons (1/18), Royal Australian Artillery.
- Major William John Mair (3/37540), Australian Staff Corps.
- 4/32866 Warrant Officer Class I Richard Thompson Mattison, Royal Corps of Australian Electrical and Mechanical Engineers.
- The Reverend Stuart Campbell Calder, Royal Australian Air Force.
- Flight Lieutenant Edward William Frederick Sunderland (03283), Royal Australian Air Force.
- Warrant Officer Stanley Nevitt (A31232), Royal Australian Air Force.

Civil Division

- Fanny May Austin, of Gordon, New South Wales, in recognition of her services to charity.
- Harold Crawford Avent, Secretary, Commonwealth Public Service Board.
- Edith Maud Breeze, of Darlinghurst, New South Wales, in recognition of her long public service.
- Edward Brownhill, of Greensborough, Victoria, in recognition of his devoted service to the Limbless Soldiers' Association of Australia.
- Alfred Lawrence Duffy, of Albury, New South Wales, in recognition of his work for charity.
- Merline Annie Duncan, of Ballarat, Victoria, in recognition of her devoted services to the blind.
- William James Field, JP, of Queenscliff, Victoria, in recognition of his outstanding community service.
- William Robert Golding, of Gladstone, Queensland, in recognition of his long and outstanding community service.
- Ivan Mayo Gunn, Chairman of the Victorian Communications Committee for the Olympic Games, 1956.
- Thelma Eileen Jarrett, of Camberwell, Victoria. For her contribution in the assimilation of new settlers.
- Leonard Knuckey Manderson, Telecommunications Representative on the Victorian Communications Committee for the Olympic Games, 1956.
- John Augustin O'Shannassy. For services in connection with the technical and broadcasting facilities for the Olympic Games, 1956.
- Laura Pugh, of Ravensthorpe, Western Australia, in recognition of her long community work.
- George Rees, of Ascot, Queensland, in recognition of his long community service.
- Viva Berton Sundercombe, of Mount Lawley, Western Australia. For social welfare services.
- Margaret Sturge Watts, of Potts Point, New South Wales. For her contribution in the assimilation of new settlers.
- Fannie Eleanor Williams, ARRC, in recognition of her service to the Walter and Eliza Hall Institute of Medical Research, Melbourne, Victoria.

=== Companion of the Imperial Service Order (ISO) ===
Australian Civil Service.

- Jacob Fletcher, formerly a senior officer of the Department of Customs and Excise.

=== British Empire Medal (BEM) ===
Military Division

- Chief Petty Officer Richard John Rodda, R.19227, Royal Australian Navy.
- 3/1062 Sergeant (temporary) Geoffrey John Davidson, Royal Australian Army Service Corps.
- 2/111207 Staff-Sergeant William Edgar, Royal Australian Artillery.
- 2/1291 Staff-Sergeant Frederick George Lee, Royal Australian Army Service Corps.
- 1/978 Warrant Officer Class II (temporary) James Eric Nugent, Royal Australian Corps of Signals.
- 3/114114 Sergeant Reginald John Ogden, Royal Australian Artillery.
- 3/10113 Warrant Officer Class II (temporary) Arthur Robinson, Royal Australian Infantry Corps.
- 3/4591 Warrant Officer Class II (temporary) William Thomas Royal, Royal Australian Engineers.
- A32127 Corporal Ronald Ashfield White, Royal Australian Air Force.

Civil Division

- Leonard Beadell, Range Reconnaissance Officer, Weapons Research Establishment, Salisbury, South Australia.
- Victor Myer Julius Benjamin, Assistant Welfare Officer, Personnel Branch, Postmaster-General's Department.
- James Chalmers, lately Foreman, Grade "A" (Special), Ordnance Factory, Maribyrnong.
- John Reginald Rowlands, Supervising Technician, Grade 3, Metropolitan Branch, Engineering Division, Postmaster-General's Department.

=== Royal Red Cross (RRC) ===
==== Associate of the Royal Red Cross (ARRC) ====
- Major (temporary) Margaret Catherine Carmody (F1/45), Royal Australian Army Nursing Corps.
- Section Officer Joan Dorothy Kirwan (N39728), Royal Australian Air Force Nursing Service.

=== Air Force Cross (AFC) ===
- Squadron Leader Selwyn David Evans (022127), Royal Australian Air Force.
- Squadron Leader Kenneth Grant McAtee (05837), Royal Australian Air Force.
- Flying Officer Robert Henderson Kelly (022179), Royal Australian Air Force.

=== Queen's Commendation for Valuable Service in the Air ===
- Flying Officer Sydney Noel Grant (022089), Royal Australian Air Force.
