= Clapham College =

Secondary school in Greater London, England

Location
- Malwood Road; Clapham Common, Greater London, SW12 8EN; England; 51.4519°N 0.1496°W

Information
- Type: Private school then voluntary-aided grammar school then comprehensive
- Religious affiliation: Roman Catholic
- Established: 1897
- Founder: Xaverian Brothers
- Closed: 1989
- Local authority: Lambeth
- Gender: Male
- Age: 11 to 18

Clapham College was a Roman Catholic secondary school for boys in South London.

== Background ==
It opened in 1897 and closed in 1989. Its history falls into three phases: for half a century it was a private school, for three decades it was a publicly supported grammar school, and then for more than a decade it was a comprehensive school. For virtually the whole of its life Clapham College occupied a site between Nightingale Lane on the edge of Clapham Common and Malwood Road, SW12 8EN. The site is now occupied by Saint Francis Xavier 6th Form College (SFX) and Newton Preparatory School.

Clapham College was also the name of the local further education college on South Side.

== Foundation ==
Clapham College was founded by the Xaverian Brothers or Congregation of St. Francis Xavier (CFX) a religious order founded by Theodore James Ryken in Bruges, Belgium in 1839 and named after Saint Francis Xavier. The order was dedicated to the Roman Catholic education of boys.

In the course of the nineteenth century the Catholic population of England grew rapidly, largely through Irish immigration. In 1850 a diocesan structure was restored and one of the most urgent concerns of the new hierarchy was to make provision for religious education. Religious orders played a vital part in meeting this need. The Xaverians were the first teaching brothers to make a permanent establishment in England in 1848 when they founded an elementary school in Bury near Manchester. In 1862 the Xaverians founded a secondary school in Manchester the Catholic Collegiate Institute, later renamed Xaverian College. A little later they founded a boarding school in Mayfield in East Sussex, Mayfield College. After Clapham College came a boarding school in Brighton (1909)—this was the school the actor Sir Ralph Richardson ran away from—and Bootle (1932). Later in the twentieth century the number of brothers declined. In 1977 England was redefined as a region rather than a province of the Xaverian Brothers. In 2003 the Xaverian Brothers withdrew from their remaining English missions.

The founding of Clapham College in 1897 was part of a wave of Catholic school building in the second half of the nineteenth century. Other foundations in South London include St. Joseph's founded by the De La Salle Brothers, Salesian College founded by the Salesians of Don Bosco and Wimbledon College founded by the Jesuits. Orders of nuns founded schools for girls. Notre Dame High School in Southwark was actually established before any of the boys' schools—in 1855.

== Private School from 1897-1945 ==
In 1896 the Xaverian Brothers bought Broadoak, a property in Nightingale Lane. The house had been built in 1875 for the widow of Sir Titus Salt. Classrooms and dormitories were built—for some of the pupils would be boarders—and the school opened in September 1897 with 30 boys initially. The school's patron saint was St Joseph and its motto was Concordia res parvae crescunt ('In harmony, small things grow'). The school increased in scale and scope and in 1905 a chemistry laboratory was built and the playing fields at Norbury acquired. In 1922 there were 276 boys on roll. In 1924 a preparatory department was opened in Hollywood, the next-door mansion in Nightingale Lane. In 1932 the school stopped taking boarders and during the 1930s the school had around 200 boys. At the beginning of the Second World War there was a planned evacuation of all schools from London and in 1939 Clapham College was evacuated to East Grinstead (East Grinstead County School) and then to Taunton in 1944.

== Grammar School from 1945-1975 ==
In April 1945, the school returned to Clapham and became a voluntary aided Grammar School under the Education Act 1944. The school was partially funded by the local authority and also the RC dioceses. The preparatory department came to an end. Pupils who had passed the Eleven Plus were entered and assigned to two parallel streams – A and Alpha – which continued from the first form through to the fifth. In the sixth form, streams were defined by subject. At this time the School had around 350 pupils (in 1950 there were 338 boys on the roll). It was one of only two Catholic grammar schools in south London. Although the school had been founded by a religious order and some of the teachers were brothers, most were lay persons. However, until 1970, when Mr C. Pocock took over as headmaster from Br. Peter (P. Nolasco), the Head had always been a brother.

== Comprehensive School from 1975–89 ==
In 1975, Clapham College Grammar School amalgamated with the nearby St. Gerards RC Secondary Modern on Clapham Road to become Clapham College School for Boys RC Comprehensive. Both were voluntary-aided, I.L.E.A. (Inner London Education Authority)/ RC Diocese-managed secondary schools. This amalgamation was in line with the general move towards comprehensive education and the RC dioceses reacting to an expected fall in pupil numbers after the baby boom.

The St. Gerards site was closed, sold and demolished and its staff and pupils moved to the Clapham College site. The incumbent headmaster of St. Gerards, Mr M Gleeson, became headmaster of the new amalgamated school. He was assisted by two deputy heads: Mr Cecil Pocock (pastoral) the incumbent head of the grammar school, and Mr Price (administrative). Mr Price retired around 1979 and was replaced by Mr Fagan.

Modern buildings to accommodate the new school were completed in 1975, on what had been the playing fields at the back of the ‘old’ Clapham College. The eponymously named 'Old Buildings' there were reconditioned. A new main entrance to the enlarged school was opened on Malwood Road, Clapham.

The new school's initial 'first year' intake was in 1975. Here it continued until 1985, when the site was designated as the location for the new St. Francis Xavier Sixth-Form College (SFX). Clapham College School was then moved to the site of the former Notre Dame Convent School for Girls, Battersea, with Mr Sparks as headmaster.

Following Mr Gleeson’s retirement in 1984, Mr Sparks, who had replaced Mr Fagan as deputy head around 1982, took over as head (Cecil Pocock having already retired in 1983).

In July 1985, the school moved from the Malwood Road site to re-open the following September on the site of the former Notre Dame Convent School for Girls, Battersea. The relocated Clapham College School took with it some teachers, the second to fifth year pupils and some sixth formers. Other sixth-formers, together with the remaining teachers, stayed in Clapham at SFX.

The relocated school was initially based in two locations in Battersea. These were the site of the recently closed Notre Dame Convent School for Girls on Battersea Park Road and the I.L.E.A. building on Raywood Street (which housed the classes for the boys in the second and third years). Classes moved from Raywood Street when space became available at the 'main' Notre Dame site as the older pupils left and the numbers dwindled. The Notre Dame site itself was then finally closed and the remaining pupils were housed at Raywood Street until July 1989, when the school closed completely.

== Sixth Form College in 1985 ==
The St. Francis Xavier Sixth-Form College now occupies the Nightingale Lane site (though its entrance is on Malwood Road). It offers an education to those aged 16–19 and gives priority to students from the eight Catholic secondary schools in the Boroughs of Lambeth, Southwark and Wandsworth (Bishop Thomas Grant, John Paul II, La Retraite, Notre Dame, St Michael's, St Thomas the Apostle, Sacred Heart, and Salesian).

== Notable alumni ==
- Michael Aldrich - innovator, entrepreneur; pioneer of online shopping
- Phil Babb - footballer
- George Andrew Beck - Archbishop of Liverpool from 1964–76
- Michael Knowles - Conservative MP from 1983–92 for Nottingham East
- Karl Sabbagh - Palestinian-British writer, journalist and television producer
- Sir Nicholas Scott, PC, JP - Conservative MP from 1974–97 for Chelsea, and from 1966–74 for Paddington South
- Peter Smith - Roman Catholic Archbishop of Southwark
- Michael Turvey, Professor of Experimental Psychology at the University of Connecticut
- Steve Steen - actor, comedian
- Mike Stephens (DSO, DFC and 2 Bars) - Fighter ace with No 3 Hurricane Squadron in World War II
- Jim Sweeney, actor and comedian
- Lawrence Upton - poet, graphic artist
- Sir Michael Wilshaw - Chief Inspector of Schools in England and Head of Ofsted)

== Pupils' memories ==
I went to Clapham College Grammar School, a bit of a dump with the appearance of quality, where I learned a great deal but very little that helps one pass exams. I did quite well in the first two years, ok in the next 2, passing English and Maths in the 4th year, and terribly thereafter, once I discovered that the main thing was to be registered in the morning and afternoon and then one was largely free... but then, to invert a line, which I believe comes from Ursula Le Guin, the teachers didn't know what I was studying.

Lawrence Upton, poet/graphic artist

"When will my apprenticeship begin, Sir?" "It has begun," said Ogion. There was a silence, as if Ged was keeping back something he had to say. Then he said it: "But I haven't learned anything yet!",'Because you haven't found out what I am teaching' replied the mage,

Ursula Le Guin -
