= Oscar Alan Spencer =

British economist (1913-1993)

Oscar Alan Spencer CMG
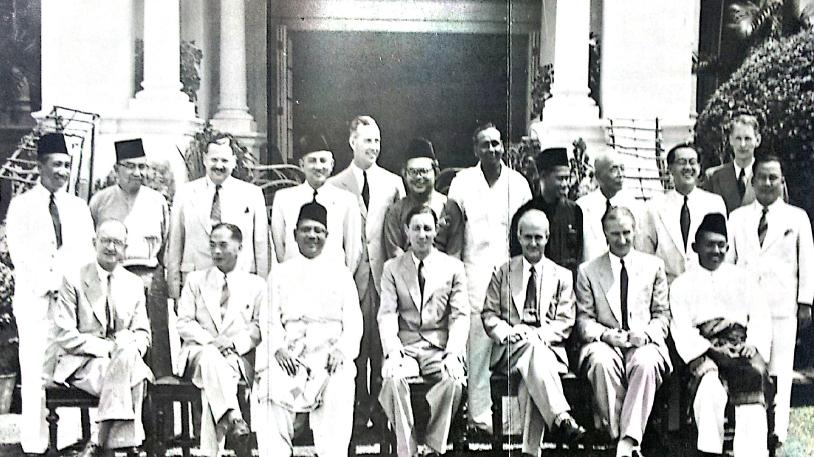
- Cabinet of the Federation of Malaya, 1955. Spencer is standing 3rd left
- Born: 12 December 1913; Eastleigh, Hampshire
- Died: 12 September 1993 (aged 79)
- Education: London School of Economics
- Occupation: Economist
- Years active: 1939-1983
- Children: 2 sons and 1 daughter

Oscar Alan Spencer CMG (12 December 1913 – 12 September 1993) was a British economist who served with the Colonial Office and the United Nations, and was economic adviser to the governments of Malaya, British Guiana, Sudan, Ethiopia and the Seychelles.

== Early life and education ==
Oscar Spencer was born on 12 December 1913 in Eastleigh, Hampshire, the son of the Madrid correspondent of the Daily Telegraph. His father died when he was six months old and he was raised by his mother who owned a milliner's shop in Chelsea. He was educated at Mayfield College, Sussex, and the London School of Economics where he received his BCom in 1936. He won the Premchand Prize in Banking and Currency (1936) and was John Coleman Postgraduate Scholar in Business Administration (1936–37).

== Military service ==
After working for two years with the Manhattan Bank in London, he was commissioned into the Royal Army Service Corps and was sent to join the Eighth Army in the Western Desert. Later he took part in the Sicily landings and served the remainder of the war fighting in Italy where he was mentioned in dispatches and rose to the rank of Lieutenant-Colonel. After "liberating" San Marino soon after the Germans had left he was made Commander of the Order of St Agatha. He was again mentioned in dispatches after the war for organising supply lines to people starving in the Netherlands.

== Career ==
In 1945, Spencer joined the Colonial Office and was sent first to British Guiana as Economic Adviser and Development Commissioner. He also served as Interior Commissioner in 1949.

In 1950, he was transferred to Malaya as Economic Secretary. There he made an important contributions to the recovery of the economy of Malaya after the Second World War. He organised financial support for the rubber industry enabling it to recover from the devastating effects of the Japanese occupation. He was deeply involved in the tin and electricity industries, serving as Chairman of the Malayan Central Electricity Board from 1952 to 1955. In 1955, he was appointed Minister of Economic Affairs. From 1956 to 1960 he served as Economic Adviser and Head of the Economic Secretariat of the Federation of Malaya. He led Malayan delegations at international meetings. In 1956 and 1957, he was Adviser to the Malayan delegation at the Constitutional and Financial Conferences in London where details of the plans for independence were prepared, including the first economic plan for the post-independence government led by Tunku Abdul Rahman. He was a close friend of Tunku Abdul Rahman who made him Knight of the Order of Defenders of the Realm, a rare honour for a European, and offered him Malayan nationality and the post of ambassador in Paris, which he declined.

In 1960, he joined the United Nations and was sent to Sudan as the UN Technical Assistant Adviser liaising between the government in Khartoum and the World Bank who had provided financial support to the Government of Sudan. From 1960 to 1964, he served as Economic Adviser to the Government of Sudan, and from 1964 to 1966, he was the first Senior Regional Adviser on Public Finance and Head of Fiscal Section at the UN Economic Commission for Africa. In 1966 he was appointed Financial Adviser to the Government of Ethiopia but retired from the UN in 1976 when the Marxist regime overthrew Emperor Haile Selassie.

He then went to the Seychelles where from 1976 to 1983, he served as economic adviser to the Seychelles Government, and from 1979 to 1981 as Deputy Chairman of Seychelles National Investment Corp.

== Personal life and death ==
Spencer married Diana Walker in 1952 and they had two sons and a daughter. He died on 12 September 1993, aged 79.

== Honours ==
Spencer was appointed Companion of the Order of St Michael and St George (CMG) in 1957 Birthday Honours. In 1944, he was made Commander of the Order of St Agatha, San Marino. In 1958, he was appointed Knight of the Order of Defenders of the Realm (PMN).
