= Xaverian Brothers =

Religious institute established in Belgium

- Congregation of the Brothers of Saint Francis Xavier
- Abbreviation: C.F.X.
- Formation: 1839; 187 years ago
- Founder: Br. Theodoor Jacobus Rijken, C.F.X.
- Type: Lay Religious Congregation of Pontifical Right (for Men)
- Headquarters: 4409 Frederick Ave., Baltimore, MD 21229, USA
- Members: 163 (2019)
- Superior General: Br. Daniel Skala, C.F.X.
- Website: xaverianbrothers.org

The Congregation of St. Francis Xavier or Xaverian Brothers is a Roman Catholic religious institute founded by Theodore James Ryken in Bruges, Belgium, in 1839 and named after Saint Francis Xavier. The institute is dedicated to education.

== History ==
Theodore James Ryken was born in 1797 in the small village of Elshout, North Brabant, the Netherlands, to ardently Catholic middle class parents. Orphaned at a young age, Ryken was raised by his uncle. Ryken was trained as a shoemaker. He felt a calling by God which drew him to work first as a catechist, followed by helping manage an orphanage, and later by caring for cholera patients in the Netherlands.

At age 34, Ryken went to North America, where he served as a catechist among the missionaries to the Native Americans. During his three-year tour, he conceived the idea of starting a congregation of brothers to work alongside the missionary priests. On returning to Europe, he set about planning to found such a society in Belgium, a country known for its missionary zeal.

=== Founding ===
When Ryken returned to the United States in 1837, Bishop Joseph Rosati of the Diocese of St. Louis, Missouri, persuaded him that the children of Catholic immigrants were in even more need of instruction than Native Americans. The bishop encouraged him to found a congregation of laymen to teach all classes of youth. Six other bishops sanctioned his plan to bring religious teachers to the United States.

Ryken went to Rome to receive the permission and blessing of Pope Gregory XVI for his mission. He then, at Bishop Boussen's request, served a year's novitiate with the Redemptorist Fathers. He modeled the religious garb of members of his institute on that of the Redemptorists. The spirit of the Xaverian Brothers, on the other hand, can be traced to the influence of Isidore Van de Kerckhove, the Jesuit confessor and counselor of Ryken; De Kerckhhove drew up the original rules of the order. Although many religious institutes were being founded at the time as part of a Catholic revival that succeeded the fall of Napoleon I, Ryken had a different vision. He wanted to found a missionary institute rather than a congregation that would address the needs of a specific region.

On June 15, 1839, Ryken, then 42 years old, settled in a rented house on Ezelstraat in the centuries-old city of Bruges, Belgium. For five days he waited for the arrival of the two companions who had promised to join him in his undertaking: a weaver and a tailor. His companions proved to be less dedicated and resilient than he and he needed a year to recruit better suited candidates. He and his colleagues soon opened two primary schools in Bruges, and some of the Xavieran Brothers were sent to a normal school at Sint-Truiden for professional teacher training.

By 1841, the community had grown beyond the space available in the little house on Ezelstraat; with a loan from a sympathetic banker, Ryken purchased a large estate in a neighboring section of Bruges called "Het Walletje", for the moat that surrounded it. A boys' sodality was opened at Het Walletje, followed shortly by a primary school in the same place; the work of catechizing was taken up at the Church of Notre-Dame, and some attention was given to the training of deaf-mutes. The brothers' first grammar school was opened at Bruges in 1844 and in the following year a second school was established. The Xaverian Brothers began to attract candidates from Germany, the Netherlands, Belgium, England, Ireland and France.

In 1848, a colony of brothers went to England to open schools in parishes in Bury and Manchester. Eventually, they opened Clapham College, London and the boarding schools of Mayfield College and its associated preparatory boarding school at Foxhunt Manor, in Sussex. Mayfield College closed in 1999 because of the lack of entrants to the order.

=== Troubles and resignation ===
For the rest of his superiorship, Ryken would be burdened by the loan he took in order to purchase Het Walletje. In addition, he was not a very good administrator, and his institute had a crisis at the Mother House in Bruges. Ryken was asked to tender his resignation by Jean-Baptiste Malou, Bishop of Bruges. Ryken willingly turned over his office to a younger man, and spent the last eleven years of his life as a simple member of the institute he had established.

Before his death on November 26, 1871, at age 74, Ryken attended the first general chapter of his institute in Bruges in 1869. By this time the institute had cleared its debt and the number of brothers had increased from 58 in 1860 to 133. They had nine well-established communities working among the poor in Belgium, England, and the United States.

=== Mission to the United States ===
In 1853 Louisville Bishop Martin Spalding invited the Xaverian brothers to open a school in his diocese, and in 1854 the first colony of brothers moved to the United States. The Brothers took charge of several parochial schools in 1864 and opened St. Xavier High School, Louisville, Kentucky.

In 1864, Spalding, then Archbishop of Baltimore, asked the Xaverians to open schools there, and they did so. Baltimore was made the center of Xaverian activities in the United States, and in 1876 a novitiate was opened there at the site of Mount Saint Joseph High School, where it still stands.

By 1900, the Xaverian Brothers had opened schools in New York, Maryland, Massachusetts, Virginia, West Virginia, and Pennsylvania.

==== Rosary making ====
A small Rosary-making club formed by Xaverian Brother Sylvan Mattingly in Louisville, Kentucky in 1949 grew to be the largest Catholic Rosary making group in the United States. Inspired by the message of Our Lady of Fatima, Mattingly formed "Our Lady of Fatima Rosary Making Club" in the basement of St. Xavier High School. Although Mattingly died in 1951, the organization grew to be Our Lady's Rosary Makers, which has 17,000 active members in the United States and has distributed hundreds of millions of free rosaries worldwide.

==== Controversy ====
Following a Pennsylvania Grand Jury ruling in 2019, an internal Xaverian Brothers investigation revealed that 34 brothers had been credibly accused of sexually abusing school children.

== Affiliated schools ==
Xaverian College	Manchester, England	http://www.xaverian.ac.uk
St. John's High School	Shrewsbury, Massachusetts	http://www.stjohnshigh.org/
St. Xavier High School	Louisville, Kentucky	http://www.saintx.com
Malden Catholic High School	Malden, Massachusetts	http://www.maldencatholic.org
Xaverian Brothers High School	Westwood, Massachusetts	http://www.xbhs.com
St. Mary's Ryken High School	Leonardtown, Maryland	http://www.smrhs.org
Xavier High School	Middletown, Connecticut	http://www.xavierhighschool.org
St. Bernard School	Uncasville, Connecticut	http://www.saint-bernard.com
St. Francis Xavier Institute	Bruges, Belgium	http://www.sfxbrugge.be
St. John's Preparatory School	Danvers, Massachusetts	http://www.stjohnsprep.org
St. Francis Xavier Sixth Form College	London, England	https://www.sfx.ac.uk/
St. Francis Xavier University	Antigonish https://stfxuniversity.ca/	
St. Bernard's Institute	Knokke, Belgium	https://web.archive.org/web/20041210231933/http://home2.scarlet.be/stbk/
Mount Saint Joseph High School	Baltimore, Maryland	http://www.msjnet.edu
Xaverian High School	Brooklyn, New York	http://www.xaverian.org
Our Lady of Good Counsel High School	Olney, Maryland	http://www.olgchs.org
Nazareth Regional High School	Brooklyn, New York	http://www.nazarethrhs.org/
Lowell Catholic High School	Lowell, Massachusetts	http://www.lowellcatholic.org/
Saint Joseph Regional High School	Montvale, New Jersey	http://www.saintjosephregional.org/

== Previously affiliated schools ==
St Francis Roman Catholic Grammar School	Hartlepool, England	n/a
St Joseph Preparatory School	Bardstown, Kentucky	1911-68
Leonard Hall Jr. Naval Academy	Leonardtown, Maryland	n/a
Mayfield College	Mayfield, England	n/a
Mission Church High School	Boston, Massachusetts	1925-68
Flaget High School	Louisville, Kentucky	1942-74
Notre Dame Junior Senior High School	Utica, New York	1959-n/a
