= Michael Strickland (British Army officer) =

Major-General Michael Strickland CMG DSO OBE MM
- Born: 25 August 1913; British India
- Died: 19 December 1982 (aged 69); Winchester, Hampshire, England
- Military career
- Allegiance: United Kingdom
- Branch: British Army
- Service years: 1934–1969
- Rank: Major-General
- Service number: 66223
- Units: Royal Tank Regiment; 16th/5th The Queen's Royal Lancers
- Commands: 145th Regiment Royal Armoured Corps; North Irish Horse; Royal Armoured Corps School; 40th Battalion, Royal Tank Regiment
- Conflicts: Second World War
- Awards: Companion of the Order of St Michael and St George; Distinguished Service Order; Officer of the Order of the British Empire; Military Medal; Order of the Star of Jordan

Major-General Eugene Vincent Michael Strickland, CMG, DSO, OBE, MM (25 August 1913 – 19 December 1982) was a British Army officer who served as a military adviser to the King of Jordan.

== Military career ==
Strickland, who was born in India and lived there until after his father, a military officer, was killed during the First World War was educated in England at Mayfield College and the Royal Military College, Sandhurst. On 1 February 1934 he was commissioned a second lieutenant onto the Unattached List for the Indian Army and served in India between March 1934 and May 1935 on attachment to the 1st Battalion, King's Shropshire Light Infantry, a British Army regiment, at Delhi. Following financial difficulties, he resigned his commission on 8 May 1935, never having joined an Indian Army unit, and then enlisted in the ranks in the Royal Tank Regiment (RTR).

Strickland first saw action in the Second World War in the Battle of France with the 4th Battalion RTR, during which he held the rank of sergeant and was awarded the Military Medal for his part in the counter-attack at Arras when he took about 80 German soldiers prisoner. His tank was disabled in friendly fire by a British anti-tank crew who mistook his for being German and although he later evacuated from Dunkirk he was erroneously reported missing presumed killed; he received the notification to his wife after arriving at home. He received a commission for the second time on 26 December 1940, becoming a lieutenant in the RTR. Strickland served with the 145th Regiment Royal Armoured Corps in the North African campaign between 1942 and 1943. During 1943 he fought as part of the HQ Squadron of the 25th Army Tank Brigade and the 51st (Leeds Rifles) Royal Tank Regiment, before becoming second-in-command of the North Irish Horse in January 1944. Strickland was promoted to war substantive major in June 1944. He fought in the Italian campaign as Commanding Officer of the 145th Regiment Royal Armoured Corps and the North Irish Horse. In December 1944 he was awarded the Distinguished Service Order. In January 1945 he became Commandant of the Royal Armoured Corps School, a position he held until June that year.

Strickland served in Greece with the British Military Mission there from June 1945 until July 1946, holding the rank of temporary lieutenant colonel. On 22 February 1947 he transferred to the 16th/5th The Queen's Royal Lancers with a permanent commission, with seniority from August 1939. In 1948 Strickland commanded the 40th Battalion RTR in Egypt. He subsequently held various positions in the War Office until 1955, and was promoted to full lieutenant colonel on 30 June 1955. He was invested as an Officer of the Order of the British Empire in January 1955.

Strickland worked as an adviser in the Arab Legion until 1956 and was the Senior British Officer in Jordan between 1956 and 1957. From August 1958 to December 1959 he was Senior Army Liaison Officer in Amman, in which position he served as Military Adviser to King Hussein of Jordan. He became a Companion of the Order of St Michael and St George in January 1960. From 1961 to 1962 he was Director of Plans at the War Office and was promoted to brigadier on 6 February 1961. Strickland retired in 1969, having been promoted to major general in 1966, and ended his career as Chief of Joint Services Liaison Organisation, British Army of the Rhine.

== Personal life ==
Strickland married Barbara Mary Farquharson Meares Lamb in 1939, and together they had four sons and one daughter. One of his sons, Tim, later an archaeologist and historian, published his biography, Strick - Tank Hero of Arras in 2021.

== Bibliography ==
- Strickland, Tim (2021). Strick - Tank Hero of Arras. Casemate Publishers (Oxford). ISBN 9781612009858.
