= Christopher Hammerbeck =

British military officer and businessman

Brigadier Christopher John Anthony Hammerbeck, CB, CBE (born 14 March 1943), late the Royal Tank Regiment, is a former British military officer and businessman, who works as a senior advisor at International Risk Ltd. He is currently the president the Hong Kong & China Branch of The Royal British Legion.

Born on 14 March 1943, Hammerbeck was educated at Mayfield College in Sussex before becoming an articled clerk with a large firm of London solicitors in 1961, where he remained until 1964.

He joined the military around 1965, serving in Northern Ireland, where he was awarded the General Officer Commanding's Certificate for Gallant Conduct. He was later in command of the 4th Armoured Brigade during the 1990-1991 Gulf War in Saudi Arabia, Iraq and Kuwait, for which he was made a Companion of the Order of the Bath (C.B.) in 1991. He was named Deputy Commander and Chief of Staff of British Forces Overseas Hong Kong. In Hong Kong he was the executive director of the British Chamber of Commerce.

Hammerbeck was appointed CBE in the 2007 New Years Honours List for services to British business interests in Hong Kong.
