= John Laffin =

Australian military historian (1922–2000)

- Born: 21 September 1922; Mosman, Sydney, Australia
- Died: 23 September 2000 (aged 78); Canberra, Australia
- Occupation: Military historian
- Writing career
- Genre: Modern military history

John Laffin (21 September 1922 – 23 September 2000) was an Australian 20th century military historian.

== Early life ==
John Alfred Charles Laffin was born on 21 September 1922 at Mosman, Sydney, Australia. Both of his parents had served with the British Imperial military forces in World War I, his father as a commissioned infantry officer, and his mother as a nurse.

In the late 1930s Laffin was employed as a trainee journalist on the staff of Smith's Weekly, one of Australia's most patriotic newspaper-style magazines, and the Wagga Wagga Advertiser. In 1941 he enlisted as a Private into the 2nd Australian Imperial Force, subsequently being commissioned as an officer and going on to see active service in the New Guinea campaign in World War II.

== Journalism, education and writing career ==
After the war, Laffin worked for a number of newspapers and magazines and began his own feature service and editing unit. In the mid-1950s he relocated with his family to the United Kingdom, where he resided for 40 years, earning a living initially as a school master, teaching History, English and Geography in secondary schools, one of which was Mayfield College in East Sussex (where he taught in the 1960s whilst living in Herstmonceux). In the late 1950s he attempted to establish himself as a fiction writer, publishing several novellas under the pseudonyms 'Carl Dekker' and 'Mark Napier', but without commercial success.

In the early 1960s, while still working as a teacher, he began writing military histories, which after a few years sold well enough to allow him to abandon teaching and earn a living as a professional military historian and writer, as well as intermittent pieces of journalism in the field. Laffin was a prodigious author, producing works - many of which possessed a personally opinionated viewpoint of their subject matter - regularly for publication on a range of modern military history subjects, ranging from conflicts in the Middle East, the Falklands War, and several works on World War II, but the central subject that he returned to repeatedly throughout his career over the next 40 years was the British experience of World War I. He travelled extensively in Europe, especially along the old battlefields of World War I's Western Front.

In the field of World War I history he was trenchantly of "The Donkeys" school of thought on the subject of British Generalship, castigating the British Army High Command's conduct of military operations in the war as being wantonly profligate with the lives of its soldiers. His views, generally expressed in a choleric fashion, in this regard were detailed in his work British Butchers & Bunglers of World War One (1998), and he appeared in a British Broadcasting Corporation 'Timewatch' series television documentary on Field Marshal Earl Haig, entitled Haig: The Unknown Soldier (1996), proffering the same historical commentary.

Laffin was the instigator behind the creation of the Australian Corps Memorial Park, at Le Hamel, France, dedicated to the Australian troops who served on the Western Front in World War I. He also founded the Families & Friends of the 1st Australian Imperial Force, a society dedicated to maintaining the historical and cultural memory of the men of Australia's primary expeditionary force that fought in World War I.

== Death ==
Laffin returned to reside in Australia from the United Kingdom in failing health in 1995. He died in Canberra on 23 September 2000 at the age of 78.

== Personal life ==
While medically convalescing in Sydney in 1943 during World War II he met his future wife, Hazelle (died 1997), who was serving as a Red Cross nurse. "He returned to Australia in 1995 but Hazelle developed heart problems and died in early 1997. He is survived by his partner, Anny two daughters, Bronwen and Pirenne, and a son, Craig."

== Select bibliography ==
- Return to Glory. Sydney: Angus and Robertson, 1956. OCLC 3004158
- Middle East Journey. Sydney: Angus and Robertson, 1958. OCLC 7750918
- The Devil's Emissary. London & Sydney: Horwitz Publications, 1958. OCLC 561434885
- The Dancer of San Jose. London: Horwitz Publications, 1958. OCLC 561434863
- Jungle Manhunt. London: Horwitz Publications, 1958. OCLC 271656034
- The Face of War – the evolution of weapons and their use in ten famous battles With Ab elard-Schuman. London, 1963.
- Swifter Than Eagles: The Biography of Marshal of the Royal Air Force Sir John Maitland Salmond. Edinburgh: W. Blackwood, 1964. OCLC 4272434
- Codes and Ciphers: Secret Writing through the Ages. London; New York: Abelard-Schuman, 1964. OCLC 2114595
- Anzacs at War: The Story of Australian and New Zealand Battles. London: Abelard-Schuman, 1965. OCLC 1350353
- Jack Tar: the story of the British sailor. Cassell, 1969. ISBN 0304932744
- Surgeons in the Field. J.M. Dent and Sons. London, 1970. ISBN 0-460-03707-2
- Letters from the Front, 1914–1918. London: Dent, 1973. ISBN 0460078542 OCLC 668970
- Fedayeen. The Arab-Israeli Dilemma. New York: Free Press, 1973. OCLC 1288967
- The Arab Mind: A Need for Understanding. Cassell, London, 1975. ISBN 0-304-29489-6
- The Dagger of Islam. Sphere Books Limited, 1979. ISBN 0-7221-5369-4
- Damn the Dardanelles!: The Story of Gallipoli. London: Osprey, 1980. ISBN 085045350X OCLC 7770209
- The Israeli Army in the Middle East wars, 1948–73. London: Osprey, 1982. ISBN 0850454506 OCLC 8935856
- Fight for the Falklands! Sphere Books Limited, London, 1982. ISBN 0-312-28868-9
- The Man the Nazis Couldn't Catch. Gloucester : A. Sutton, 1984. ISBN 0862990432 OCLC 11996445
- On the Western Front: Soldiers Stories from France and Flanders, 1914–1918. Gloucester: A. Sutton, 1985. ISBN 0862992427 OCLC 14520586
- Holy War: Islam Fights, John Laffin, Grafton Books, London, 1988. ISBN 0-586-06868-6
- The War of Desperation: Lebanon 1982–85. London: Osprey, 1985. ISBN 0850456037
- A Western Front Companion, 1914–1918: A-Z Source to the Battles, Weapons, People, Places, Air Combat. Far Thrupp: Alan Sutton, 1994. ISBN 075090061X
- We Will Remember Them, Kangaroo Press, Sydney, 1995. ISBN 0-86417-735-6
- Hitler Warned Us. Brasseys, London, 1995. ISBN 1-85753-103-5
- Jackboot : a history of the German soldier 1713–1945. First published 1965 in hardback by Cassell & Company Ltd. Republished by David & Charles Publishers in 1989. ISBN 0715394584 Republished by Barnes & Noble Books in 2000. ISBN 1-56619-750-3
- British Butchers and Bunglers of World War One. Godalming: Bramley, 1998. ISBN 1841000124 Republished by Sutton Publishing, 2003. ISBN 0-7509-0179-9
- Tommy Atkins: The Story of the English Soldier. Trafalgar Square, 2011 ISBN 0-7524-6066-8
