= Michael Aldrich =

English inventor, innovator and entrepreneur

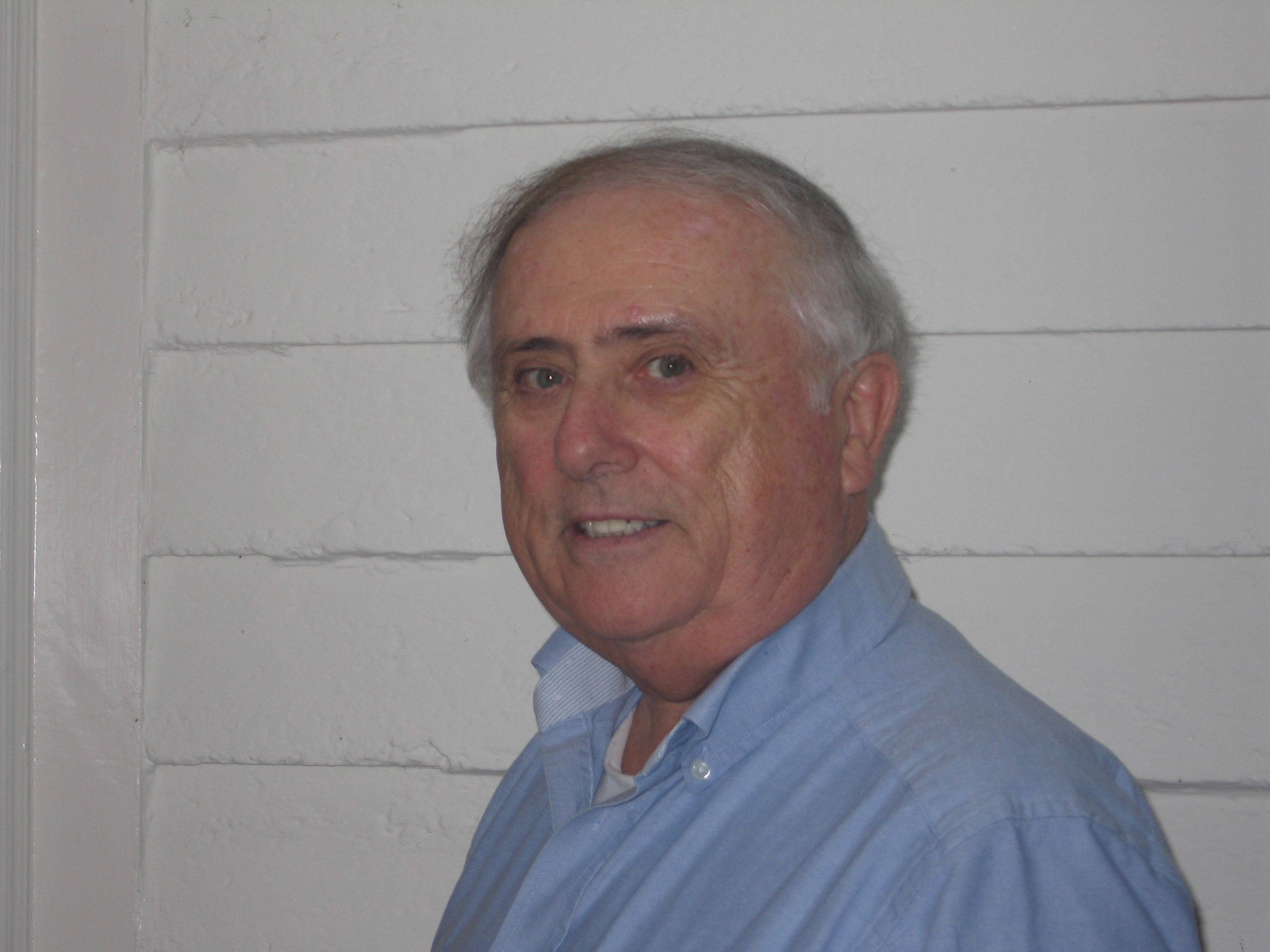
- Aldrich in 2010
- Born: Michael John Aldrich; 22 August 1941; Brocket Hall Welwyn Garden City, Hertfordshire, England
- Died: 19 May 2014 (aged 72)
- Education: University of Hull
- Known for: Creator of online shopping Teleputer; Wired city Innovative information systems

Michael John Aldrich (22 August 1941 – 19 May 2014) was an English inventor, innovator and entrepreneur. In 1979, he invented online shopping to enable online transaction processing between consumers and businesses, or between one business and another, a technique known later as e-commerce. In 1980 he invented the Teleputer, a multi-purpose home infotainment centre that was a fusion of PC, TV and Telecom networking technologies. In 1981, he developed the concept of interactive broadband local loop cable TV for mass market consumer telecommunications.

Aldrich had a 38-year career in the IT industry, 20 years of which were spent as CEO of an international computer company, Redifon/Rediffusion/ROCC Computers. He retired as CEO in 2000 and became non-executive chairman (2000–2014). He also worked for Honeywell (now Groupe Bull) and Burroughs Corporation (now Unisys).

Aside from his inventions and innovations, he is known for his pro bono public service. He was an IT adviser to British Prime Minister Margaret Thatcher 1981–86, IT adviser to the Confederation of British Industry January 1982-December 1983, president of the Institute of Information Scientists 1984–85, and chairman of the Tavistock Institute of Human Relations 1989–99. He has had a long, formal association with the University of Brighton in various capacities since 1982.

== Personal life ==
Aldrich was born on 22 August 1941 in Welwyn Garden City, Hertfordshire, England. He went to school at Clapham College in London and, in 1959, he won a scholarship to the University of Hull to study history. He became engaged to Sandy Kay Hutchings, a student at Hull Art College, originally named Hull School of Art, in 1960, and they married in 1962, just prior to his graduation. They had four children and were grandparents to eight grandchildren.

== Career ==
Aldrich spent 15 years with Honeywell and Burroughs in the UK in various sales and marketing roles, where he became known as an innovator, before joining the Board of Redifon in 1977.

In 1979, Aldrich invented online shopping by connecting a modified domestic TV to a real-time transaction processing computer via a domestic telephone line. The intellectual basis for his system was his view that videotex, the modified domestic TV technology with a simple menu-driven human–computer interface, was a 'new, universally applicable, participative communication medium-the first since the invention of the telephone.' This enabled 'closed' corporate information systems to be opened to 'outside' correspondents not just for transaction processing but also for messaging (e-mail) and information retrieval and dissemination (later known as e-business.) His language of 'impacts competitive trading position', 'using IT for competitive advantage', 'externalises labour costs', etc. became commonplace in the management consultancy industry later in the 1980s. These ideas fed into the Business Process Reengineering strategies of the 1990s. His concept of information technology as a mass communications medium is a driver for the contemporary IT industry. His definition of the new mass communications medium as 'participative' (interactive, many-to-many) was fundamentally different to the traditional definitions of mass communication and mass media and a precursor to the social networking on the Internet 25 years later.

In March 1980 he launched Redifon's Office Revolution. The 'revolution' was that corporate computer information systems had hitherto been in-house. From hereon, consumers, customers, agents, distributors, suppliers and service companies would be connected on-line to the corporate systems and business would be transacted electronically in real-time.

During the 1980s, he designed, manufactured, sold, installed, maintained and supported multiple online shopping systems, using videotex technology. These systems which also provided voice response and handprint processing pre-date the Internet and the World Wide Web, the IBM PC, and Microsoft MS-DOS, and were installed mainly in the UK by large corporations.

In 1980 he invented a system he called the 'Teleputer' by connecting a modified 14-inch colour television to a plinth containing a Zilog Z80 microprocessor running a modified version of the CP/M operating system and a chip set containing a modem, character generator and auto-dialler. The Teleputer of 1980's operate as a stand-alone colour PC (at a time when computer screens were mainly mono-chromatic), with a full complement of application software and network with other computers via dial-up or leased lines. The system included two 360 KB floppy disks (later a 20 MB Hard disk), a keyboard and a printer. The name 'Teleputer' later became synonymous with the fusion of computers, telecommunications and television in a single device. There were plans to add video-disks which at the time, in prototype form, were 12 inches. In a number of ways the Teleputer was the first home media centre concept.

Although the Teleputer had been conceived for mass market home use, it was put into production for business use with the TV tuner removed. There was no consumer electronics market for it (at the time the consumer electronics market was just waking up to the VCR) but it was relatively easy to cost-justify the Teleputer for business networking. It was widely used in the UK and, because a Cyrillic version was made, in the then USSR.

The Teleputer was often used with the online shopping systems. Most computer systems by their nature are transient but a number of Aldrich's systems were transformative. A number were recorded for posterity and case studies have survived. The world's first recorded Business-to-Business (B2B) Online Shopping system was Thomson Holidays (1981). The world's first recorded Business-to-Consumer (B2C) online shopping system was Gateshead SIS/Tesco (1984). The world's first recorded online home shopper was Mrs Jane Snowball, 72, of Gateshead, England in May 1984. The Gateshead system had an Online Shopping Basket (later renamed Online Shopping Trolley) invented by Aldrich's colleague John Phelan.

Some of the most interesting B2B applications in the surviving case studies were in the auto industry. Peugeot-Talbot (1981), then trading as Talbot Motors, installed a system for dealers to locate and adopt both a new car from the manufacturer or a used car from other dealers. Ford (1982) installed systems with ISPs in Brentwood England and Valencia Spain that permitted dealers in multiple European countries to buy new cars from Ford or transfer existing new cars from other dealers' lots. General Motors (1985) used systems for selling truck spares. The Nissan (1984) systems were truly revolutionary. They combined car purchase by the dealer from the manufacturer (known in the industry as 'adoption') with car sale and financing to the consumer. The Nissan systems networked credit ratings from outside agencies (mainly UAPT Infolink 1985) and finance provision from either Nissan or other suppliers in real-time as part of the complete consumer purchasing transaction. This is the world's first recorded B2C online shopping for high-value durable consumer goods and a model for the complex internet-based online shopping transactions for durable consumer goods that followed 20 years later. The Nissan system was copied by other credit rating and finance companies at the time but these systems appear to have been supplied by Aldrich's company under confidentiality agreements and no record is extant.

Aldrich's systems directly changed the holiday, retail, auto, finance and credit ratings industries. Online shopping was an important development for electronic commerce. E-commerce changed the way the world does business. Both of his B2C systems in Gateshead and Bradford were shopping and information services. Bradford Centrepoint (1987) even ran a news service at one point. These systems were pioneering pre-internet systems.

Aldrich's original intention had been to develop a consumer electronics market for IT systems linked to a concept for broadband interactive information processing and cable TV distribution. He had a particular schema for a wired community. He campaigned successfully to change the law in the UK to permit new cable TV technology.

Aldrich articulated the business and social potential of his mass communications medium concept of IT, and he created, sold and installed the systems to realize that idea. Well known in the 1980s in the UK, he was all but forgotten 20 years later. His ideas were copied, plagiarized and patented in the 1990s without acknowledgement. Thomson Holidays reverse-engineered his system (the sincerest form of homage in the computer business) and in the peer-reviewed 1988 report used his language while virtually air-brushing his contribution. For online shopping he produced both the system and the business rationale for using it. The tie between his online shopping systems and the information systems he created is the concept that videotex was a new, mass communications medium. That was the conceptual leap from the world of EDP to modern IT, emancipating computing from corporate information centers, and a precursor to the development of personal computers.

The three areas of his work in consumer electronics – online shopping, remote working, online banking, home information centres and broadband cable TV – and his book, papers and UK Government reports represent a significant contribution to the development of contemporary IT mass communications, consumer information and transaction systems, electronic commerce and e-business. Aldrich's ideas are the basis for Internet home shopping. In June 2011 an ICM poll in the UK voted Aldrich's date of birth as the 7th most important date in the history of the internet. In April 2012 the UK Intellectual Property Office (formerly the UK Patents Office) nominated Aldrich for a public poll to identify the UK Visionary Innovator to celebrate World IP Day on 26 April. He came 4th in the Ppll.

He was also an innovator in other areas of computer and information technology including large-scale data capture, mixed media scanning, minicomputer networking, voice response and handprint processing. He patented the world's first static signature recognition system in 1984. He founded ROCC Computers in 1984 after a management buy-out of Rediffusion Computers. The company traded mainly in the UK and Eastern Europe.

=== High-profile IT projects ===
In the 20 years from 1978 to 1998, Aldrich and his team undertook multiple high-profile projects which in a number of ways created the company's reputation. A number of case studies have survived. It was not unusual for the times that there were high-profile IT projects; what was unusual was that a UK IT company of 500–700 people became involved in high profile, high value, high risk and technically difficult projects. What is even more unusual is that there is no evidence to suggest that the projects were anything but successful.

The first project for which evidence survives provided a system to automatically read handprinted timesheets for the nationalised railway, British Rail with over 100,000 employees, to complete the weekly payroll (1978). Regional centres were established throughout the UK. Scanners were used to read timesheets and for other applications. The systems were used for a number of years.

The largest project was the Siberian Gas Pipeline for Gazprom (1981–83) where 46 computer systems with 1200 terminals and 240 Teleputers were networked to provide logistics support for the operation of the pipeline. Every aspect of the project was fraught with difficulties, including political, technical, environmental, technical support, economic and resourcing problems. Some 1500 Russian hardware and software specialists were trained. The system was the most advanced IT system then installed in the USSR. It was used for a number of years.

The largest European project was the Ford Europe system (1981–83) for dealers to locate and adopt a car, an online shopping system for dealers in the UK and much of Europe networking to systems based in the UK and Valencia, Spain. The system was used for nearly two decades. The largest UK project, apart from the Inland Revenue (the UK IRS), was the pricing of over 334 million medical prescriptions per annum for the Prescription Pricing Authority (1981–83, now NHS Prescription Services), part of the UK's single provider health system. These systems were used throughout the UK for a decade or more. The most politically sensitive project was probably the cattle passport system for the British Cattle Movement Service to address the BSE (mad cow disease) crisis in 1998. There were hundreds of other projects.

The legacy of these projects is somewhat perverse. Leading-edge technology was seen to work well and to be reasonably easy to implement. It may have encouraged others to take risks that were not always justifiable. The 1990s onwards in the UK saw a succession of big, failed IT projects.

=== Profession ===
Aldrich became a Fellow of the British Computer Society in 1984 and he was made a Chartered Fellow in 2004. In 1986 he was invited to become a Companion of the Chartered Management Institute, the UK's elite management leadership organization. He is an Honorary Fellow of the Chartered Institute of Library and Information Professionals. In 2002 he was awarded an Honorary Degree of Doctor of Letters by the University of Brighton for services to Information Technology.

Aldrich was invited to address an invited audience including British Royalty on 23 March 1983 in Edinburgh, Scotland to mark the 25th Anniversary of the founding of the British Computer Society. The speech was titled 'Computers in the Community.'

In 1987 Aldrich was made a freeman of the City of London, England. He became a founder member of the Company of Information Technologists which became a Chartered City Livery in 1992. The company's membership consists of senior IT professionals. He is a liveryman of the Worshipful Company of Information Technologists.

=== Information Technology Advisory Panel 1981–86 ===
In 1981, at the beginning of the IT age, the British Government assembled a team of six UK IT experts, on a pro bono basis, to provide high-level advice to the government. This team was known as the Information Technology Advisory Panel. It reported to Prime Minister Mrs Margaret Thatcher and was located in the Cabinet Office adjacent to 10 Downing Street in London, England. In its five-year existence it produced three reports for publication by the government. Little else is known about its activities.

Aldrich was a member of the team for the whole term of its existence. He wrote a seminal paper on re-cabling the UK with local loop broadband cable and paying for it without government subsidy by distributing cable television alongside data and telephone services. The panel then wrote a report, published it and the government subsequently changed the law to legalise such systems. By 2007, 12 million UK homes were passed by these high-speed broadband links. The second report concerned the emerging software and information business and, among other issues, identified the potential power of providers who might control both content and electronic delivery. The third report was a long-range forecast of the potential effects of IT on schools and teaching and it predicted powerful PCs on school desks. The panel was disbanded in 1986.

=== Tavistock Institute of Human Relations 1989-99 ===
Aldrich became a member of the council of the Tavistock Institute of Human Relations (TIHR) in 1988 and was elected chairman in 1989, a post he held for a decade. TIHR was then located at the Tavistock Clinic hospital in Hampstead, London, England. The TIHR was spun out of the Tavistock Clinic as a charity in 1947. The Tavistock Clinic is a centre of excellence for studying and addressing the clinical behaviour of individuals. The TIHR is focused on group behaviour.

In 1988 the TIHR had a history of being at the forefront of the social and psychological sciences but was somewhat in the shadows of the people who had once worked there or were still working there. These people were approaching retirement and the TIHR needed to renew itself. The transition of the TIHR was to take nearly two decades.

The 1989-99 period was characterised by the moving of the TIHR from the Tavistock Clinic in Hampstead to its own building in London's City financial district; the stabilisation of the institute's finances; the 50th Anniversary (1997) celebration that saluted the past achievements while embracing future challenges; the publication of the Tavistock Anthology which served to draw a line under the TIHR's previous achievements; and the development of new lines of research by a talented younger team.

Aldrich left the council in 1999. He remains a member of the Tavistock Association.

=== University of Brighton ===
Aldrich first became involved with the then Brighton Polytechnic in 1977 when he was sponsoring student employees for degrees in electronic engineering and computer science. Under the sponsorship, employees were paid to attend college full-time for degrees. In 1982 he joined the governing body of the college, became chairman and then Founding Chairman of the University of Brighton. In all he served 17 years on the governing body of the institution, 11 years as Chairman (1987–1998). He retired from the Board of Governors in 1999. In 1990 he was responsible for appointing Professor (later Sir) David Watson as the first Vice-Chancellor (1990–2005). A particularly talented leadership team developed the new university and for 1999 the university was declared 'University of the Year' by the London 'Sunday Times' newspaper. In 1992, Aldrich became Founding Chairman of the university's Foundation a fundraising body. The Aldrich family has been a longtime benefactor of the university. In 1995 Michael and wife Sandy began the Aldrich Collection of Contemporary Art which, by 2009, had grown to more than 300 works dating back over 100 years. The works have been created mainly by former students and artist professors at the university's highly rated Faculty of Art. The works are also held in web-accessible digitised form to provide a permanent virtual gallery. In 1996 the university named its new business, bio-sciences, engineering and technology library the Aldrich Library. In 2002, Aldrich relinquished the chairmanship of the foundation and remained a trustee. In 2008, Aldrich agreed to donate his IT papers for the period 1977–2000, the Aldrich Archive, to the university for teaching, learning, scholarship and research. Much of the first part of the archive which relates to technology and events has been digitised and is web-accessible. The second phase of the archive project was launched in 2010. It will gather and digitise material relating to the people who built and used the systems.

In November 2010 the University of Brighton Business School announced that it would be using the Aldrich Archive for teaching and research. A Michael Aldrich Prize would be awarded to the outstanding e-commerce student on merit each year. The first awards were made in the summer of 2011.

Aldrich died on 19 May 2014.

== Publications ==
- 'Videotex-Key to the Wired City' Aldrich MJ. Quiller Press, London 1982.ISBN 0-907621-12-0
- 'Cable Systems' Aldrich MJ, co-author, HMSO London 1982.ISBN 0-11-630821-4
- 'Making a Business of Information' Aldrich MJ co-author HMSO London 1983.ISBN 011 6308249
- 'Learning to Live with IT' Aldrich MJ co-author HMSO London 1986.ISBN 0-11-630831-1
- 'Online Shopping in the 1980s' Aldrich M 'Annals of the History of Computing' IEEE Oct-Dec 2011 Vol 33 No4 pp57–61 ISSN 1058-6180

Aldrich was a prolific writer of magazine articles, conference papers and speeches. Some have survived. Some are available from commercial publishers. A number of them have been lost or destroyed.
