= Mayfield College =

Former private school in East Sussex, England (1868–1999)

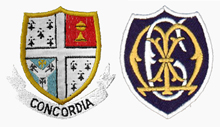

Location
- Mayfield, East Sussex, TN20 6PW; England
- Coordinates: 51.041126°N 0.268266°E

Information
- Type: Private boarding and day
- Motto: Concordia (Latin for Harmony)
- Religious affiliation: Roman Catholic (Xaverian)
- Established: 1868
- Closed: 1999
- Gender: 1868–1992 (boys); 1992–1999 (coeducational)
- Age: 11 to 18
- Colour: Navy/Light Blue/Yellow
- Former pupils: Old Magaveldians
- School Magazine: Magavelda
- Affiliated school: Foxhunt Manor

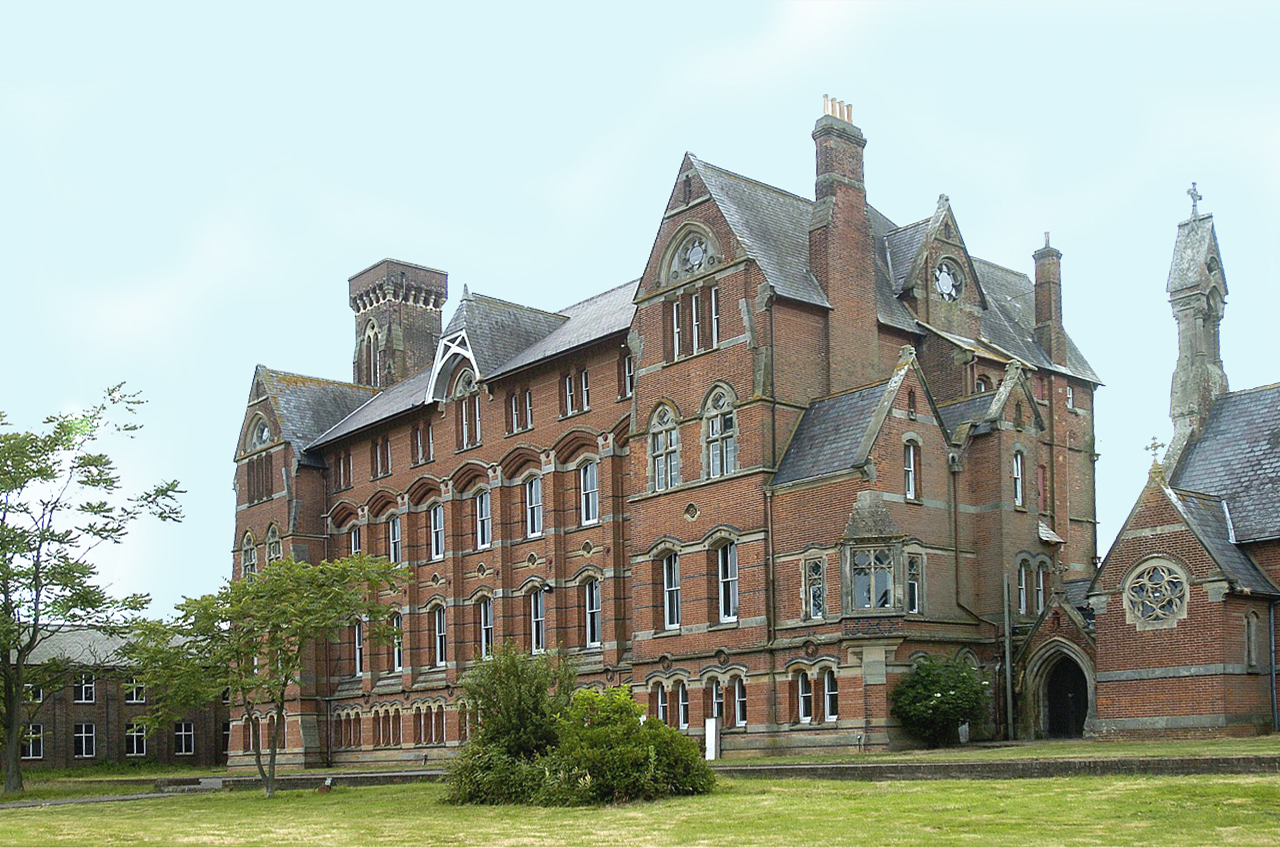
Mayfield College in 2006 – after closure, before refurbishment

Mayfield College is a defunct Roman Catholic boys' boarding school founded as the Holy Trinity Orphanage For Boys in 1865–1866 by the American-born Dowager Duchess of Leeds, Louisa Catherine Caton, one mile from Mayfield, East Sussex. The main building and attached chapel were built in the Gothic style, primarily of red brick and are Grade II listed, having been designed by E. W. Pugin. After closure in 1999 both the main building and chapel were converted into luxury apartments now collectively called Mayfield Grange. Officially opening in 1868 it was also known as the Xaverian Brothers School, St Xavier's College and Xaverian College at various times. Mayfield College was built as one of a pair of orphanages at the Duchess's expense, the other originally known as St Michael's Orphanage for Girls in Bletchingley (Mark Cross), East Sussex, also designed by Pugin.

From 1936 to 1959 Mayfield College had an associated preparatory boarding school known as the School of St Edward the Confessor at Foxhunt Manor in Waldron, East Sussex where the religious order of Xaverian Brothers also taught boys from 8–12 years of age. On closing the prep school became a convent known as Monastery of the Visitation.

== History ==
Located on Little Trodgers Lane, on a 400-foot (120 m) hill midway between the valley of the River Rother and the village of Mark Cross, ground was broken for the original orphanage in 1864. The area was originally known as De Hellingly, comprising Colkins and Pennybridge Farms. It cost £20,000 to build and took four years to complete. Many of the Canterbury red clay bricks were dug from the 109-acre (44 ha) plot at sites which later became a rifle range to the south-east and a pond to the south. They were fired in situ and transported 200 yards to the building area. Most of the external masonry was made from local sandstone also quarried nearby.

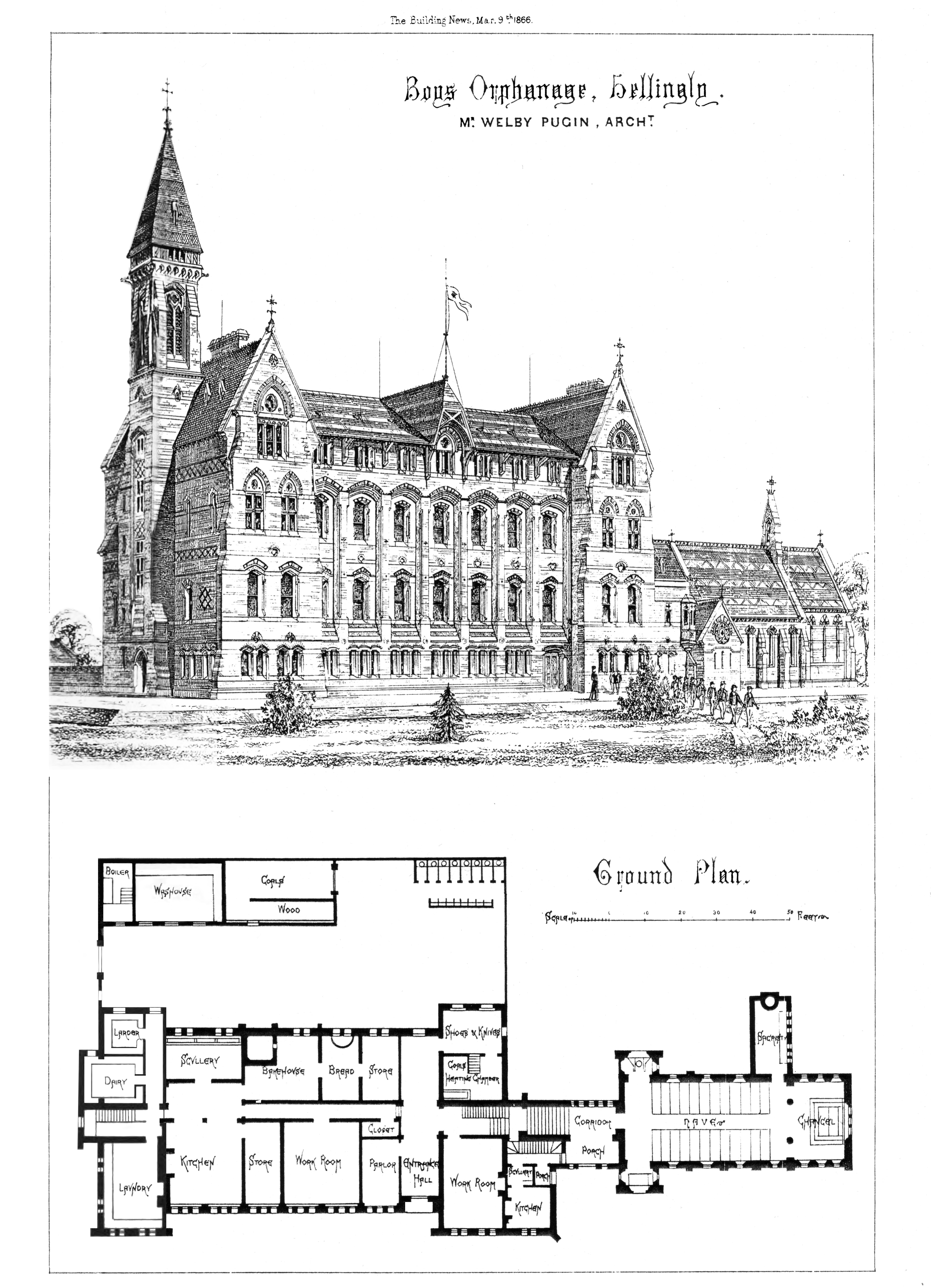
Clarified and enhanced architectural drawing from The Building News, 1868

The main wall was built 3 ft 3ins in thickness (approx. 1 metre) and the internal masonry was in Caen stone. The passages, original play rooms and offices were in finished brickwork. The basement is vaulted and the floor of the first story laid with Mintons patent tiles. Above the ground floor the walls are recessed and arched, the piers of which are further relieved by corbelled brickwork. A gothic-style chapel accommodating 150 was added to the east and to the north a playground was laid. On the far north side of the playground a series of buildings were added at right angles, intended for a laundry, bake-house and workshops. The contractor was a Mr Wilson of Canterbury.

In front of the school to the south lay extensive fields, meadows and woods. In the early years the school was self-sufficient with its own chicken run, most of the fields were cultivated or used for grazing and on the opposite hill was Pennybridge Farm, owned by the school and managed by the Brothers who employed labourers to run it. Milk and orchard produce were of sufficient quantity for the school to be a major trading partner with Mayfield Village and its Convent. Later cultivation ceased in the field immediately in front of the school where football (later cricket and rugby) pitches were laid out. A cultivated plot with lawns and a cemetery to one side were also installed. Until 1913, Pugin's vision stood untouched as a distinguished edifice visible from many miles around, faithful to his plans, but owing to faulty foundations the building had to be underpinned at this time. The tower's spire, a large chimney block and other heavy adornments were removed and its external beauty was sacrificed for practical safety.

It was almost a century before the spire was replaced and the building's majesty restored.

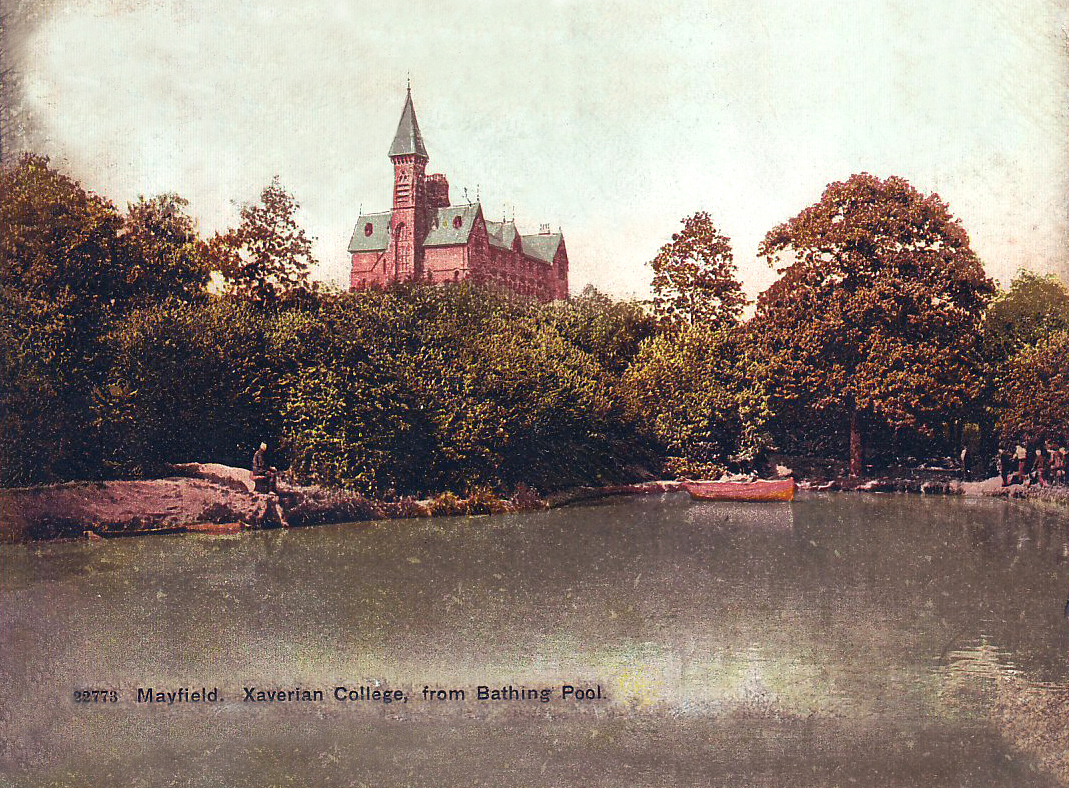
Mayfield College and bathing pool postcard, pre-1913

On 19 May 1868, less than a dozen Xaverian brothers arrived with the first 30 orphan boys from the original orphanage in St. Leonard's-on-Sea where they had been wounded by stoning and suffered continual verbal abuse. The funds left by the Duchess were found to be inadequate for even such a small number of boys so in 1883 permission was obtained from the Charity Commissioners for the acceptance of regular fee-paying boarders. The school prospered rapidly and soon 100 boys were on the roll. In 1884, it was decided to admit boys who desired to be Brothers, collected together from various Xaverian schools, to give them special religious training at Mayfield but this project was deemed largely unsuccessful and promptly discontinued. Every year a small number of fatherless boys were admitted to the school with fees paid out of the Duchess's remaining funds.

By 1904, paraffin lamps and candles had been replaced with an acetylene gas lamp installation, and much later electricity came with the arrival of other houses along the main road between Mayfield and Tunbridge Wells. Most of the Brothers had practical skills and so refectory tables, wainscoting and linen-room cupboards are a few examples of surviving woodwork meticulously hand built by Bro. Boniface in the early days. The brother of Bro. Aloysius Hollingshead, said to be one of the foremost stained glass designers of the time, installed the chapel's current rose window and the lobby windows depicting four English Martyrs. Between 1926 and 1968 additional low-budget utilitarian accommodation buildings were erected around the original school, including a school hall (erected 1907), a presbytery, an off-site sanatorium (sold by 1907), staff accommodation wing/library, an art room, physics and chemistry laboratories, indoor squash courts, a gymnasium (1964), and later a retirement home for older Xaverian Brothers. Additionally new farm buildings had been erected, a rifle range established, and an open-air swimming pool and pump house were built. All the close outbuildings, except the presbytery (later used by the school as a more convenient sanatorium), were demolished during the 2006 redevelopment.

Over the years the school became known as an academically successful secondary Independent school, exclusively teaching boys aged 11–18.

== School life ==
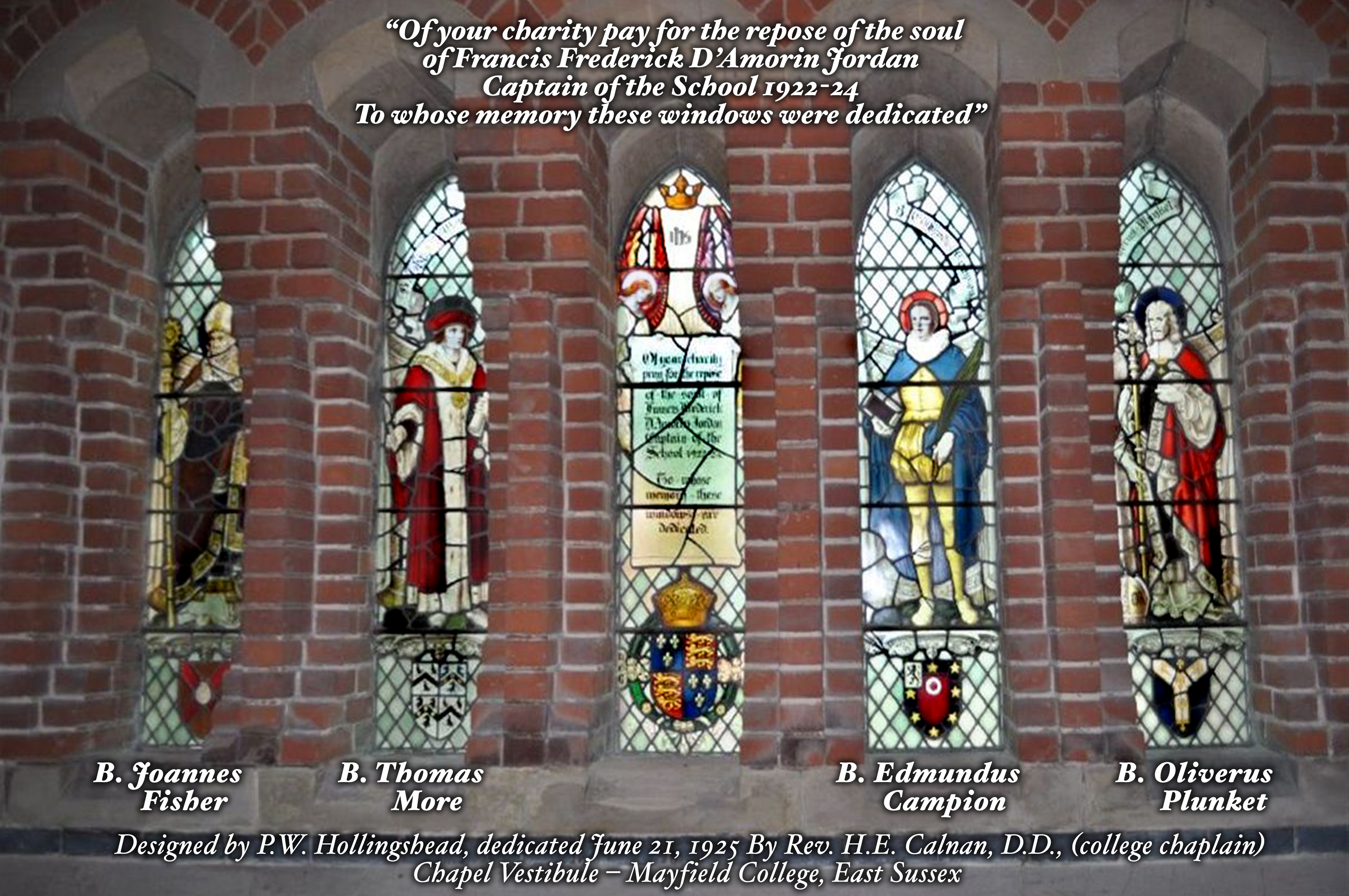
Vestibule joining school and chapel.

Many of the boarding students came from ethnic minorities, and while Catholicism was the underlying faith students were accepted without obligation from any race or religion. In later years additional lay staff were employed with non-Catholic and even non-religious beliefs. Pupils of all denominations were encouraged to maintain their religious commitment but the Catholic faith was the integrating principle, providing an ethos for work and play at the school. Pupils all belonged to one of four Houses named after saints (Edmund) Campion, (John) Fisher, (Thomas) More and (Oliver) Plunkett, memorialized both in stained glass windows in the chapel lobby and on house captain boards in the second-floor lobby, most which are preserved in the converted building. In the second half of the 20th century the House System was the most important element in a pupil's life at Mayfield, and was used to foster both camaraderie and competition in sporting, social and cultural activities. Everyone was expected to play a role and contribute to their House, and as a senior pupil it was the main mechanism through which to discover and develop a capacity for leadership in preparation for later life. "In addition to what is normally termed Catholic education we aim to give boys practice in the right use of liberty and to develop in them a sense of true responsibility," explained the headmaster in 1966.

The Duchess had stipulated that there should be six hours' schooling per day, Monday to Friday, and this became the general pattern throughout the school's existence. Prep (corresponding to homework in a day school) was rigidly enforced both before breakfast and before supper. In the early days workshops existed where boys learned a variety of practical trades including tailoring, carpentry and shoemaking. From 1915 onwards weekends were given over to Cadet Training (Saturday) choir practice and obligatory Mass attendance for all Catholic boys, sports and letter writing (Sunday) interspersed with very little unorganised time.

Prefects were appointed and while there was no official fagging system pupils were expected to help with chores in return for a House Points system, which ultimately ranked their House and was recognized with a wide range of trophies at the end of the school year. The school motto was 'Concordia', abbreviated from the Xaverian Brothers' own motto, 'Concordia res parvae crescunt' (In harmony, small things grow) and the school song was the Hymn to St Francis Xavier.

Uniforms in 1891 consisted of a dark blue jersey with sleeves, a porkpie cap and an Eton collar worn on Sundays and special occasions. Discipline was maintained at this time in medieval fashion by use of the birch and the headmaster also carried a knuckle duster. Later this was replaced with a slim bamboo cane administered by both lay staff and Brothers and used liberally well into the 1970s.

== Mayfield College Army Cadet Force ==
The Xaverian College Detachment of the Sussex Army Cadet Force was formed just before Christmas in 1915 with the first recruit, a refugee Belgian Xaverian Brother, joining on 19 January 1916. It was initially affiliated to the Sussex Yeomanry but swiftly changed to the 5th (Cinque Ports) Battalion of the Royal Sussex Regiment based in Crowborough. Throughout the existence of Mayfield College the rigid discipline of cadet training was seen to fit with the regimented school life described elsewhere here. Initially shooting took a high priority, firstly in a sand pit until later in 1934 a brick range was built in the clay quarry that had produced the school's own bricks and mortar. This remained in use until the early 1970s. During World War II Army & Home Guard Schools brought professional week-long and weekend courses for both officers and cadets where pupils and staff had very real defense responsibilities. In 1944 'doodlebugs' and planes flying overhead were a regular sight and sound. Mayfield College was used by pilots as a visual landmark on their way to London. Dogfights between German and British planes were part of Mayfield life, the skies above being at the forefront of the conflict after the Battle of Britain. On one occasion a Polish pilot's plane was shot down adjacent to one of the ponds in the school grounds where his body was found. Initially recruitment was voluntary but with the arrival of World War II all able pupils were required to join the ACF which continued to flourish on this basis into the 1970s, though by the company's disbandment in 1981 participation had become voluntary again. From 1945 sporting activities became a prominent part of cadet life with inter-school boxing, cross country running, rugby and soccer (not an official school sport) all progressively being introduced at a competitive, highly successful level. In 1957 a Nissen hut was built and regular training by Brothers and lay ex-servicemen continued in the use of firearms, military drilling, signals and fieldcraft which were all taught in a separate Saturday curriculum. Voluntary adventure camps were arranged for school holidays and many pupils were encouraged to continue into careers in the military and security services.

Forty Mayfield Old Boys died in the First World War before the corps was formed, and 29 former Mayfield cadets, mostly in the RAF or Naval Flying, died in World War II. Seventeen decorations were awarded during World War II, including a Military Cross. On several occasions planes were landed on the school playing fields during official visits, anniversaries and celebrations, most notable being that of a Harvard plane in 1944 by a much decorated squadron leader.

== Final years ==
By 1976 the school faculty consisted of few Xaverian Brothers, and day-to-day running was taken over by lay trustees. It nevertheless retained strong links with the Brothers, several of whom still lived and taught at the school. At its peak in the mid 1970s there were over 200 pupils but the character had changed with a third of boys being day-pupils and many others being weekly boarders who went home for weekends. Subsequently, with the downturn in applications from boys in the 1980s a few girls were admitted on an experimental basis. Much later in 1991 the headmaster announced that from the following year the school would officially become a coeducational institution.

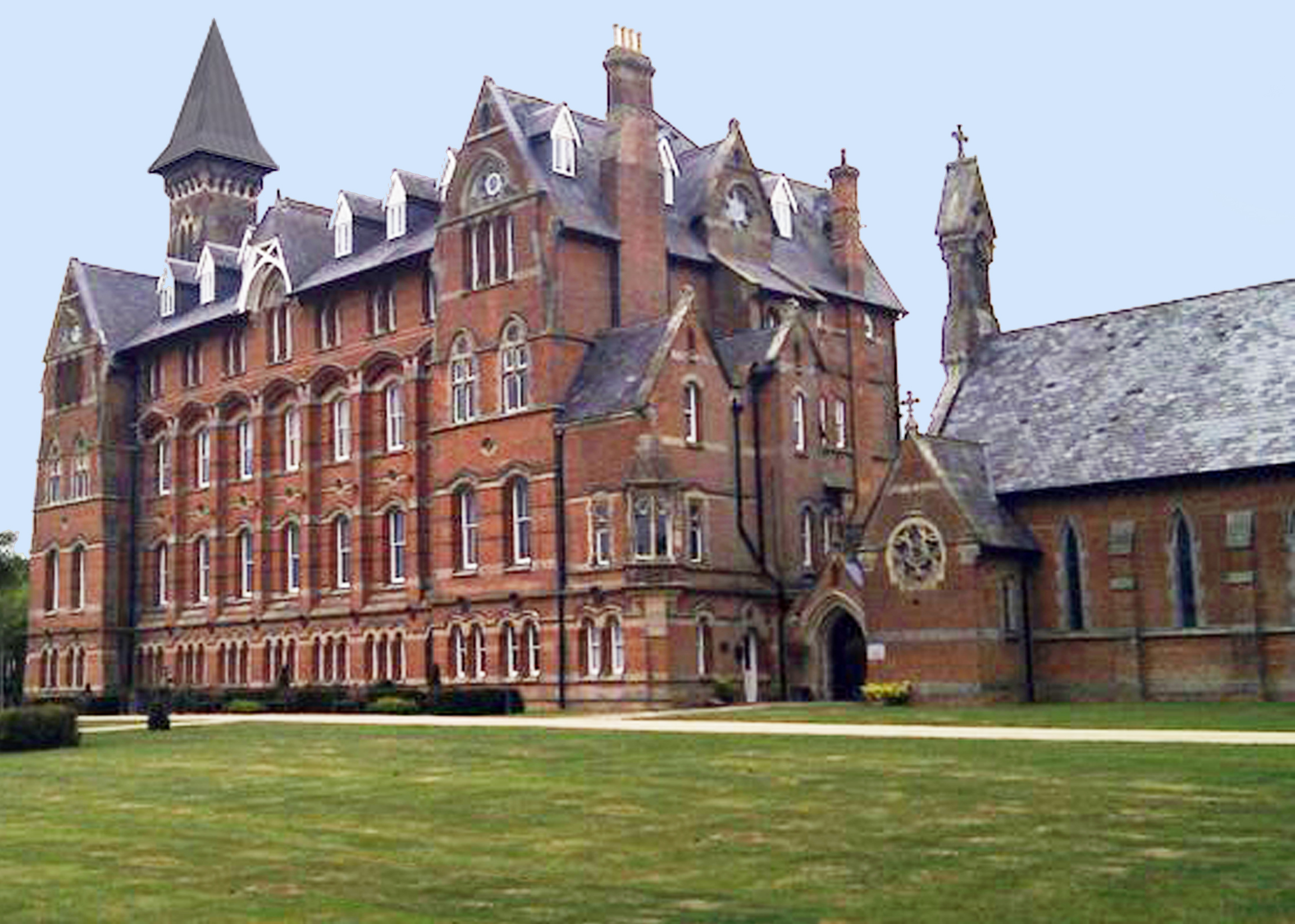
Mayfield Grange in 2010 – its tower rebuilt, its interior gutted and redeveloped

In 1995 the trust sold the school to Bellerby's College of Wadhurst. Bellerby's was owner of Wadhurst College and this led to students being bussed between schools for reciprocal co-educational sixth form classes that were held at either Mayfield or Wadhurst. In 1994 the whole business was taken over by Study Group. They had acquired the two colleges as show pieces in their language school firm but quickly realised that the serious state of disrepair of both properties would never allow their investment to repay. They closed both schools in 1999.

The Mayfield College buildings lay empty for six years with the last remaining lay teacher, Anthony Walters, living on site in a caravan. A stipulation was written into the developer's contract that until the final school occupant died, or chose to leave, the redevelopment could not proceed. After Walters' death and interment in the on-site graveyard in 2005, demolition of the various newer outbuildings commenced, at which time Weston Homes Plc, under the guidance of English Heritage, started restoration work to the main school and chapel buildings. An auction was held for some of the chapel artifacts, and the organ was donated to St Thomas of Canterbury Catholic church in Mayfield village, where it was fully restored and installed.

== Gallery ==
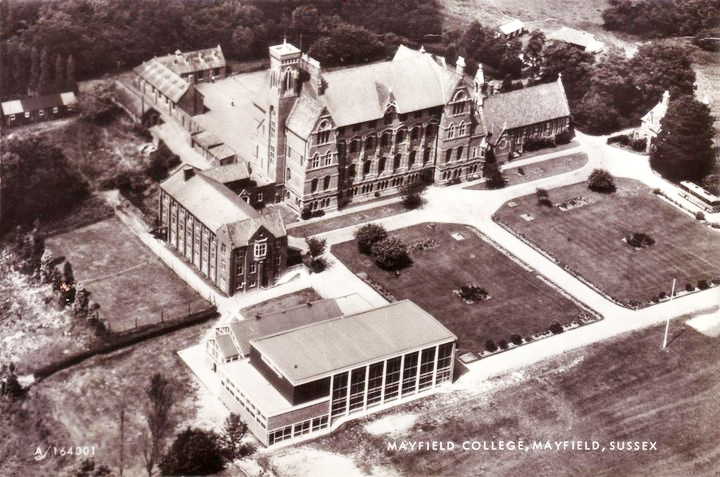
New gymnasium 1966

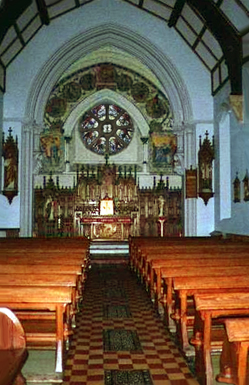
Chapel interior

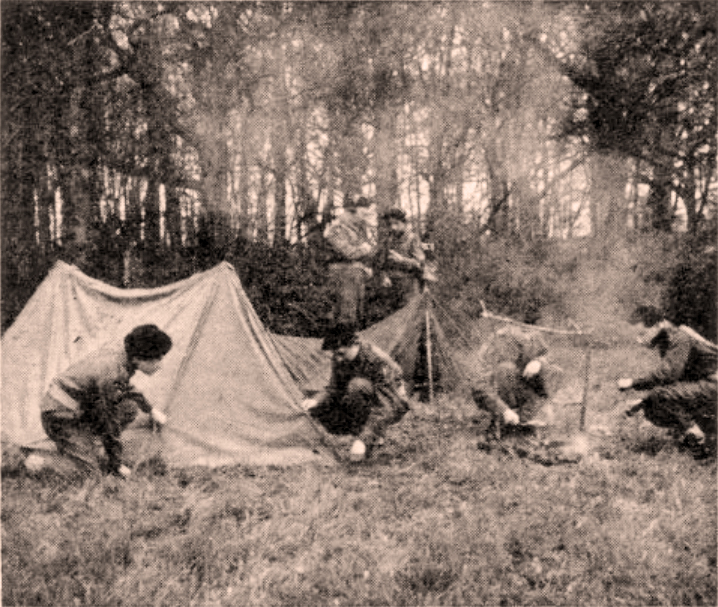
Cadet camp

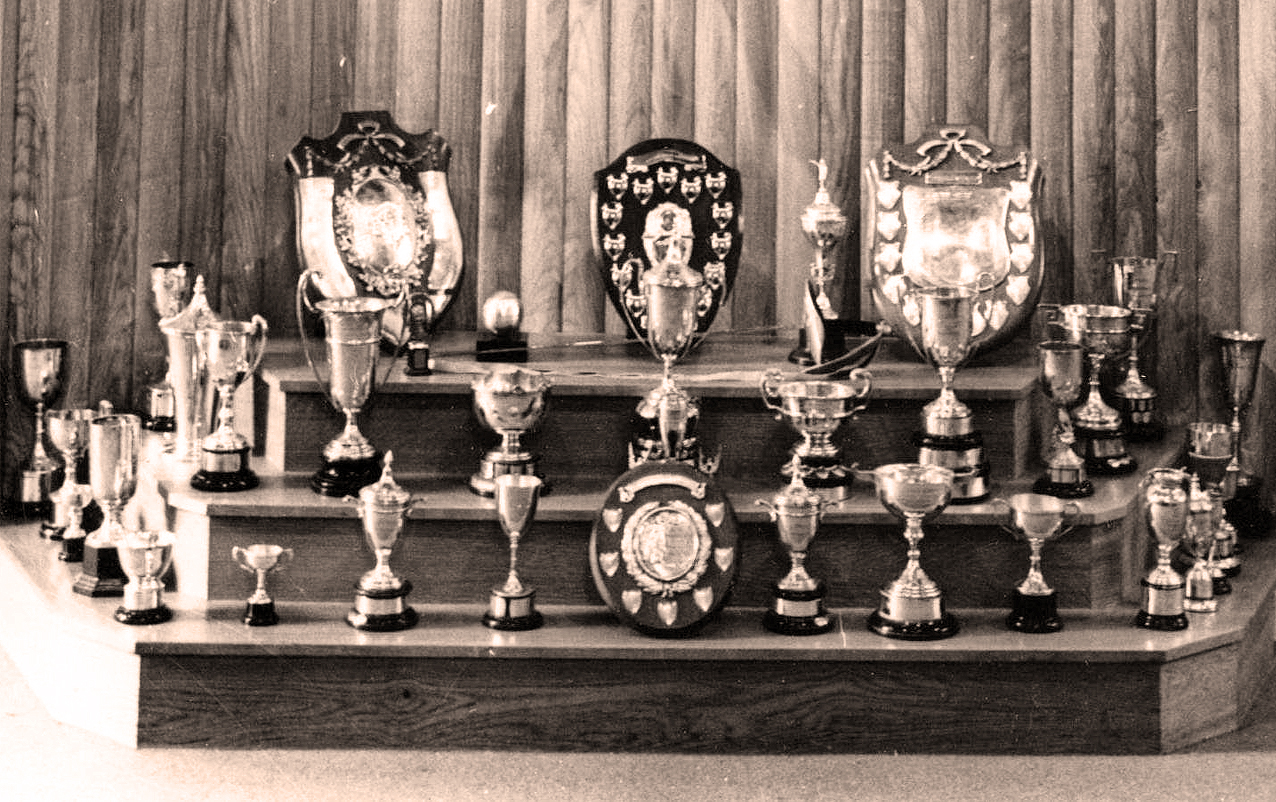
School cups

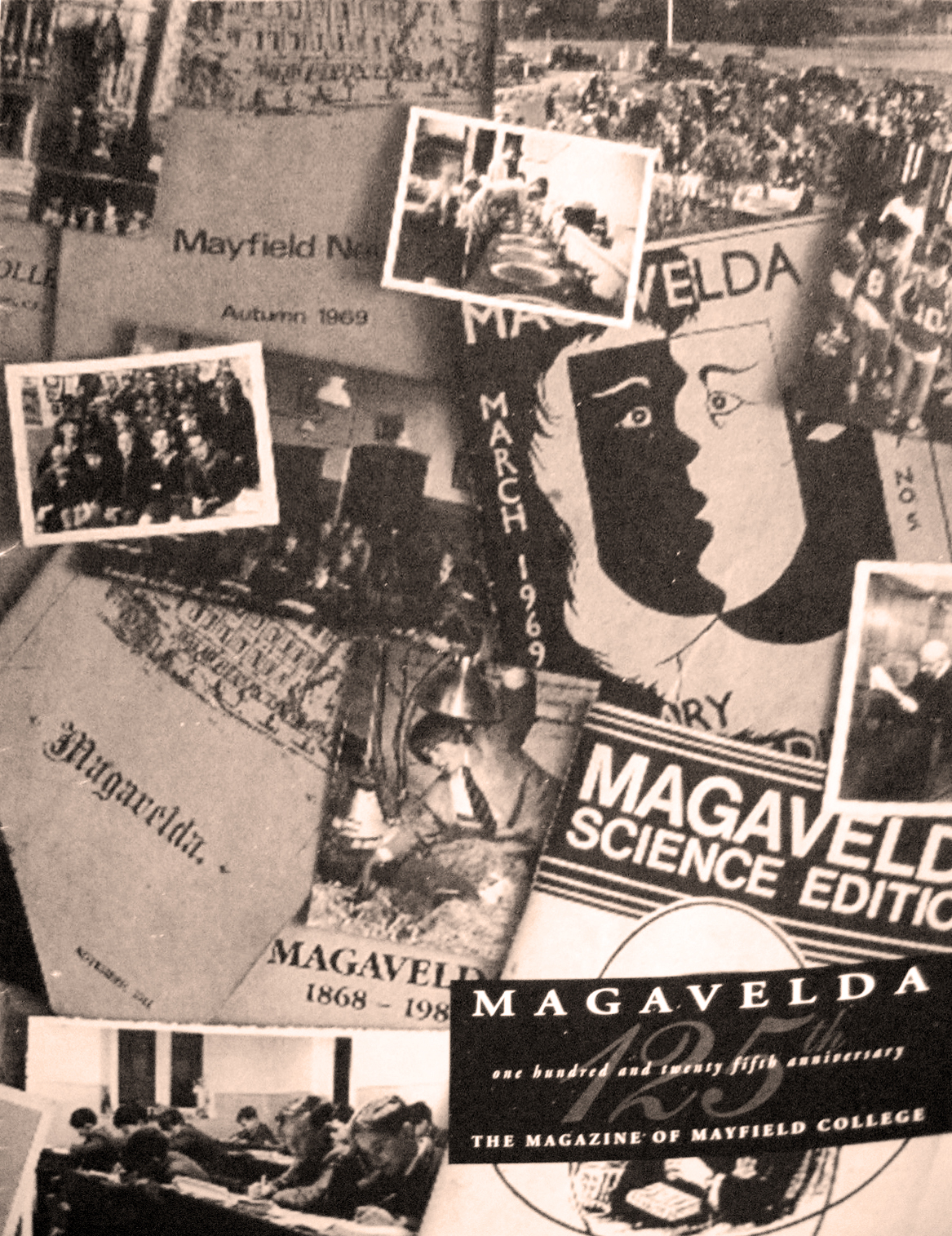
School Magazine

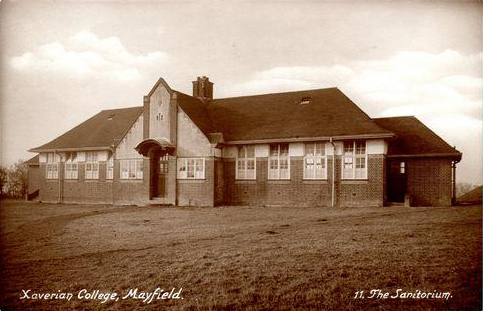
Old Sanatorium

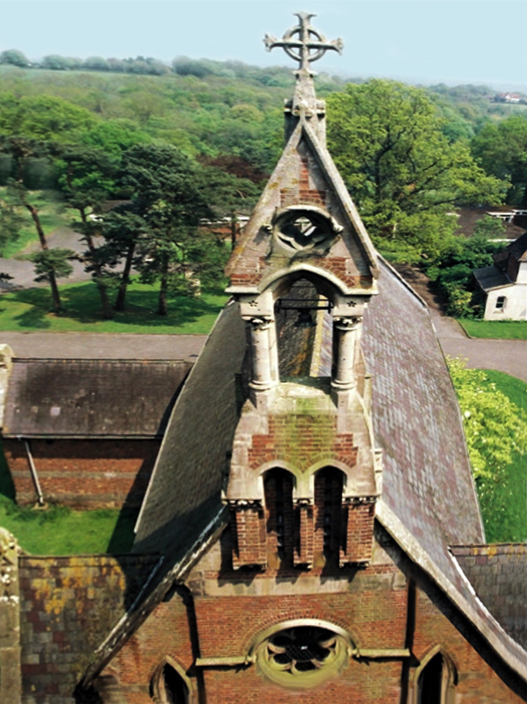
East across chapel

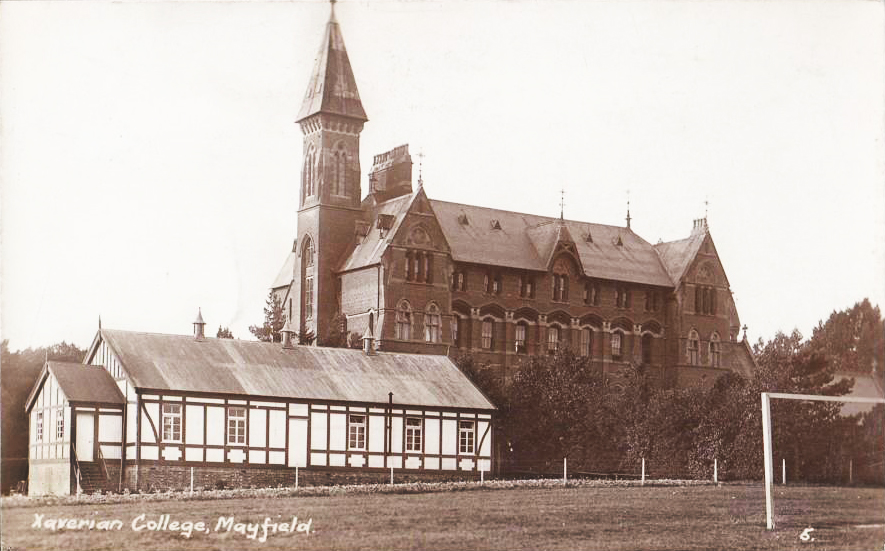
First school hall

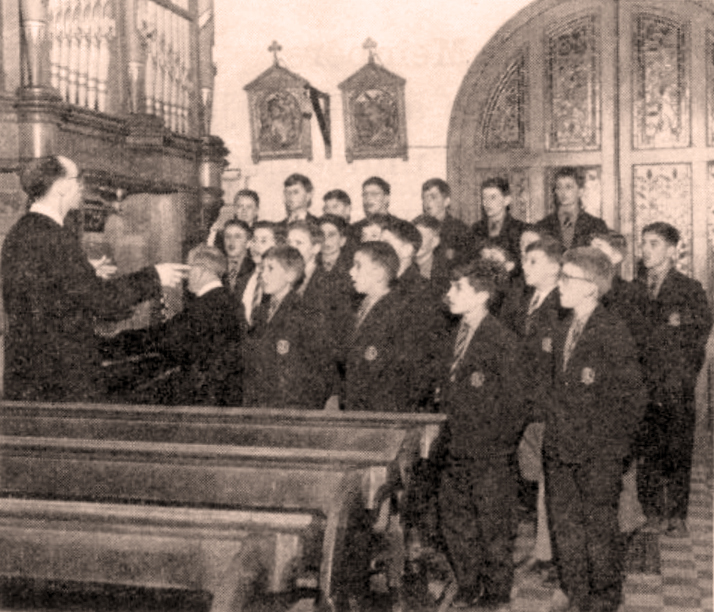
Choir practice

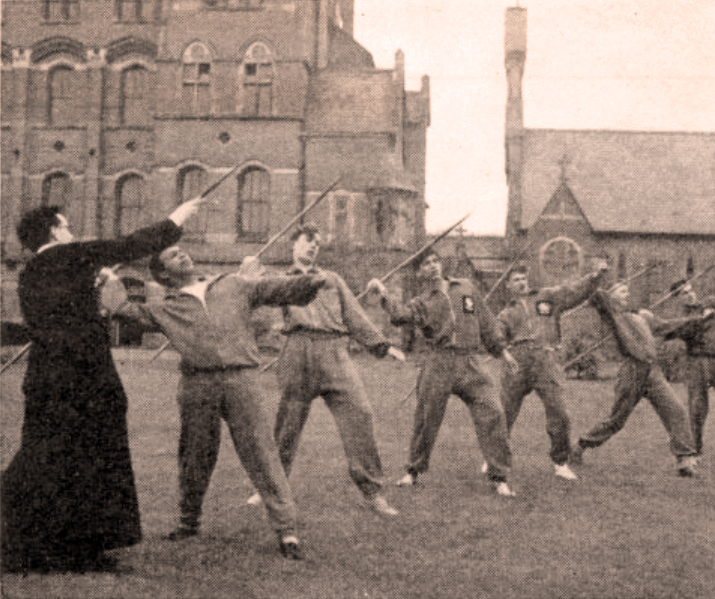
Javelin instruction

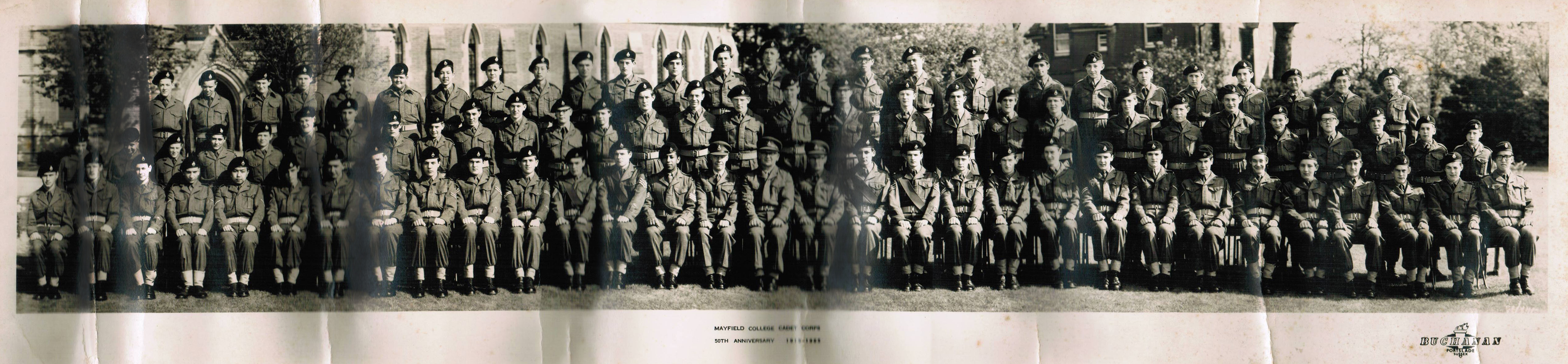
50th Anniversary – Mayfield College Army Cadet Force, 1916–66

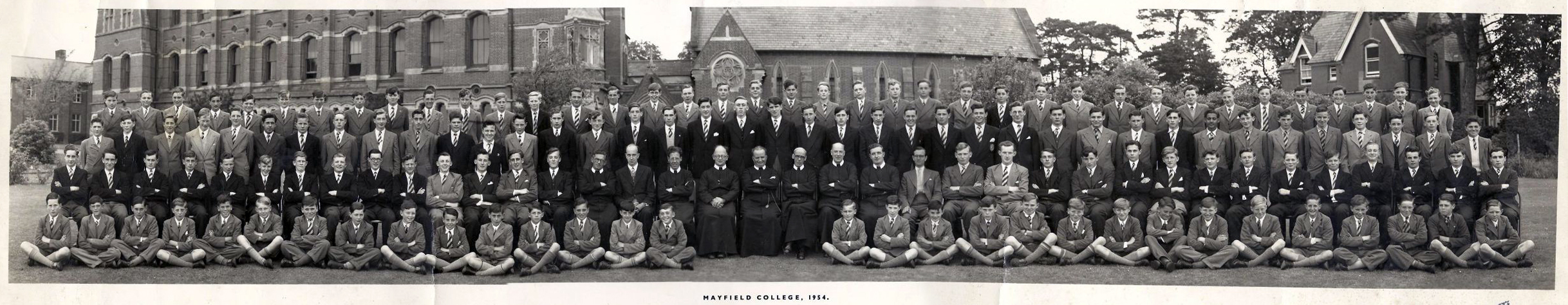
Official school photo – 1954

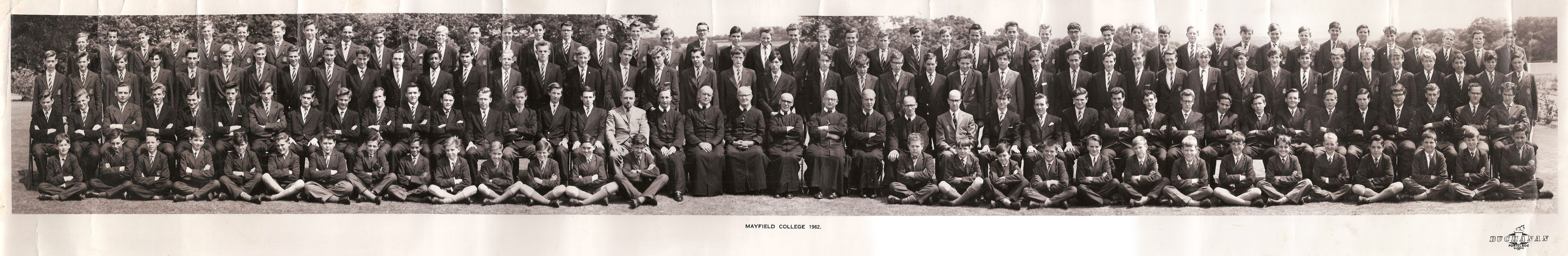
Official school photo – 1962

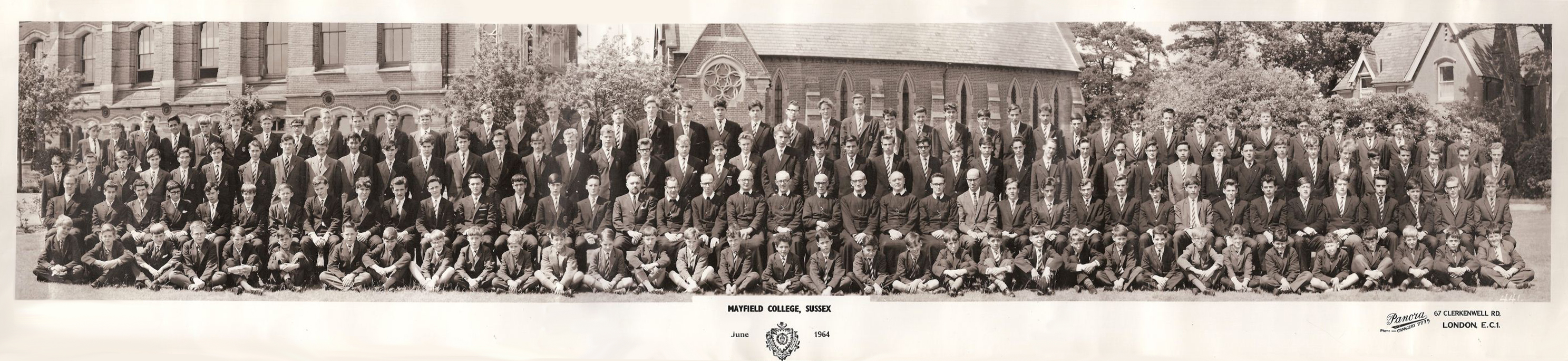
Official school photo – 1964

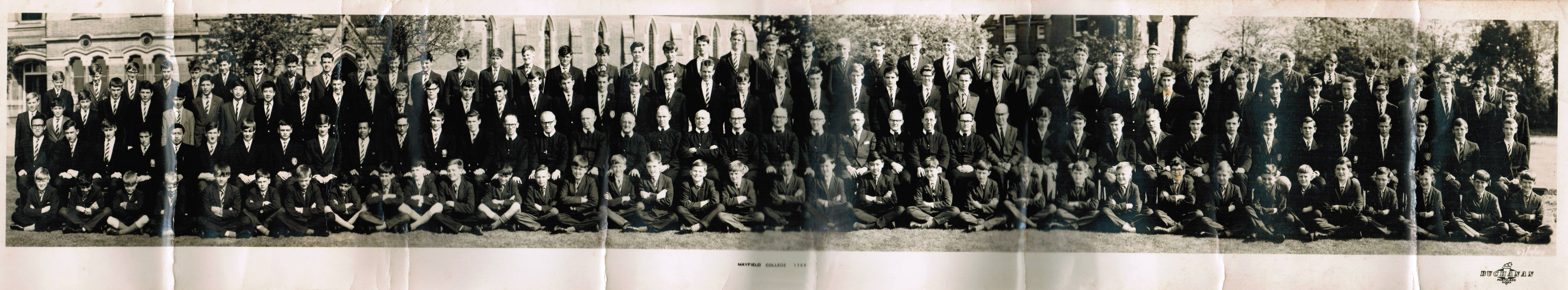
Official school photo – 1966

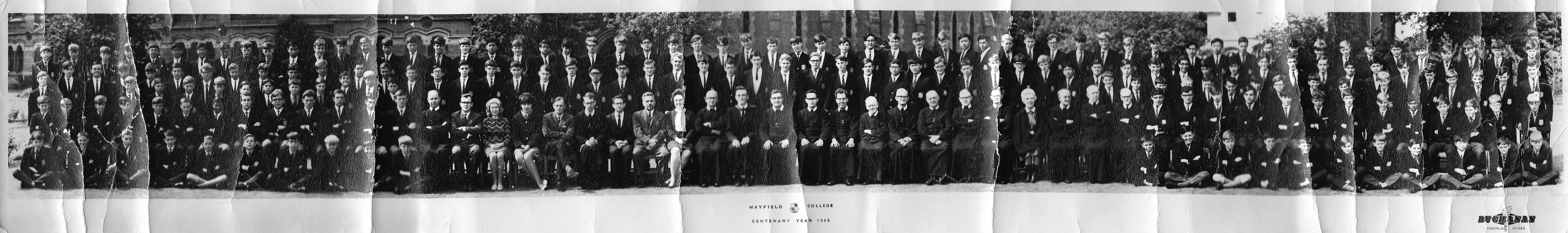
Official school photo – 1968

Official school photo – 1970

Official school photo – 1972

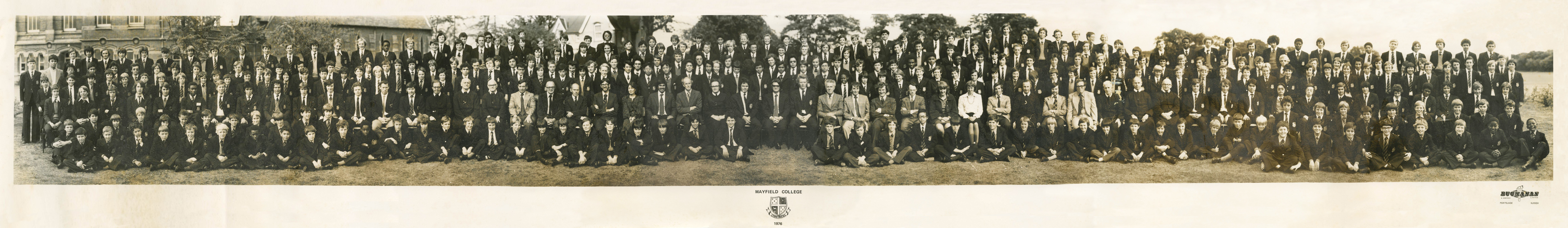
Official school photo – 1976

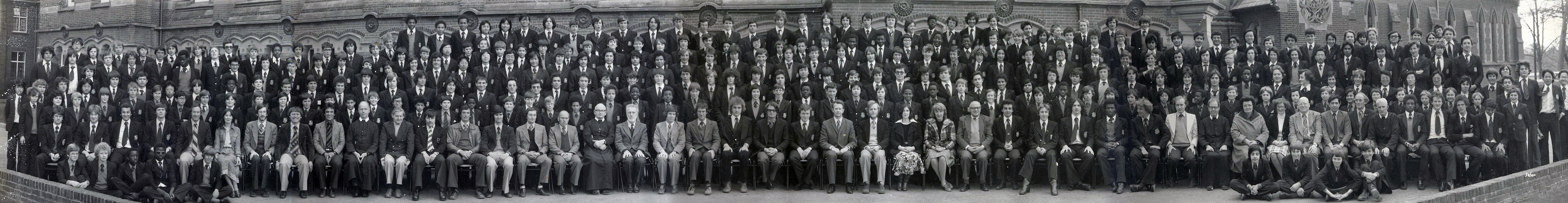
Official school photo – 1979

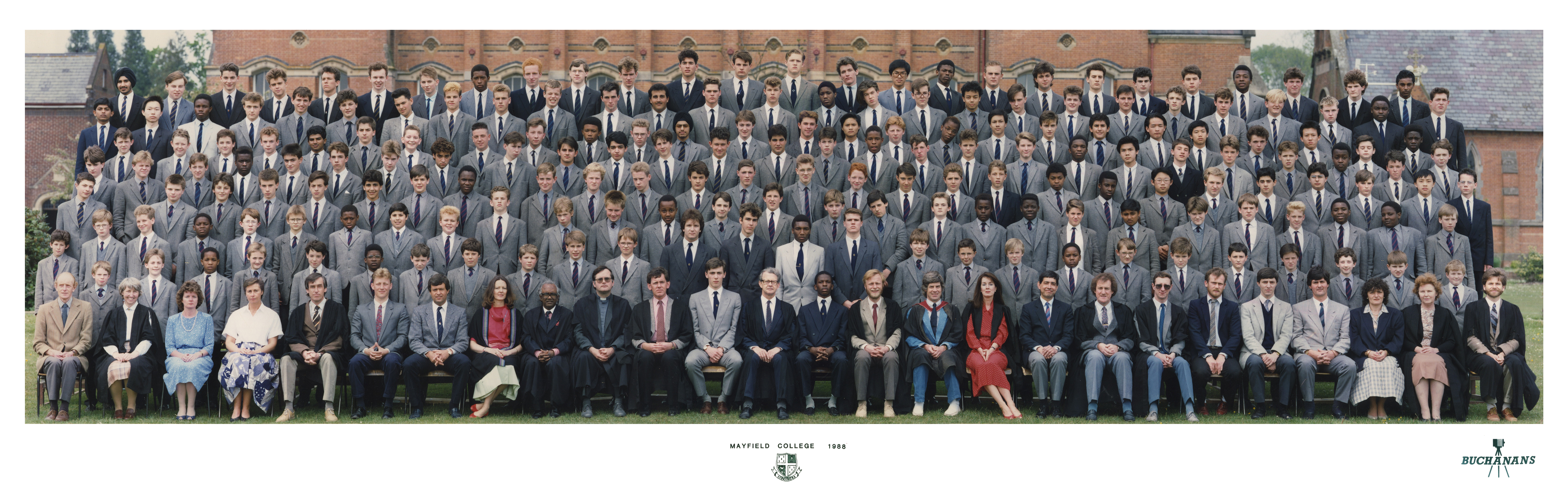
Official school photo – 1988

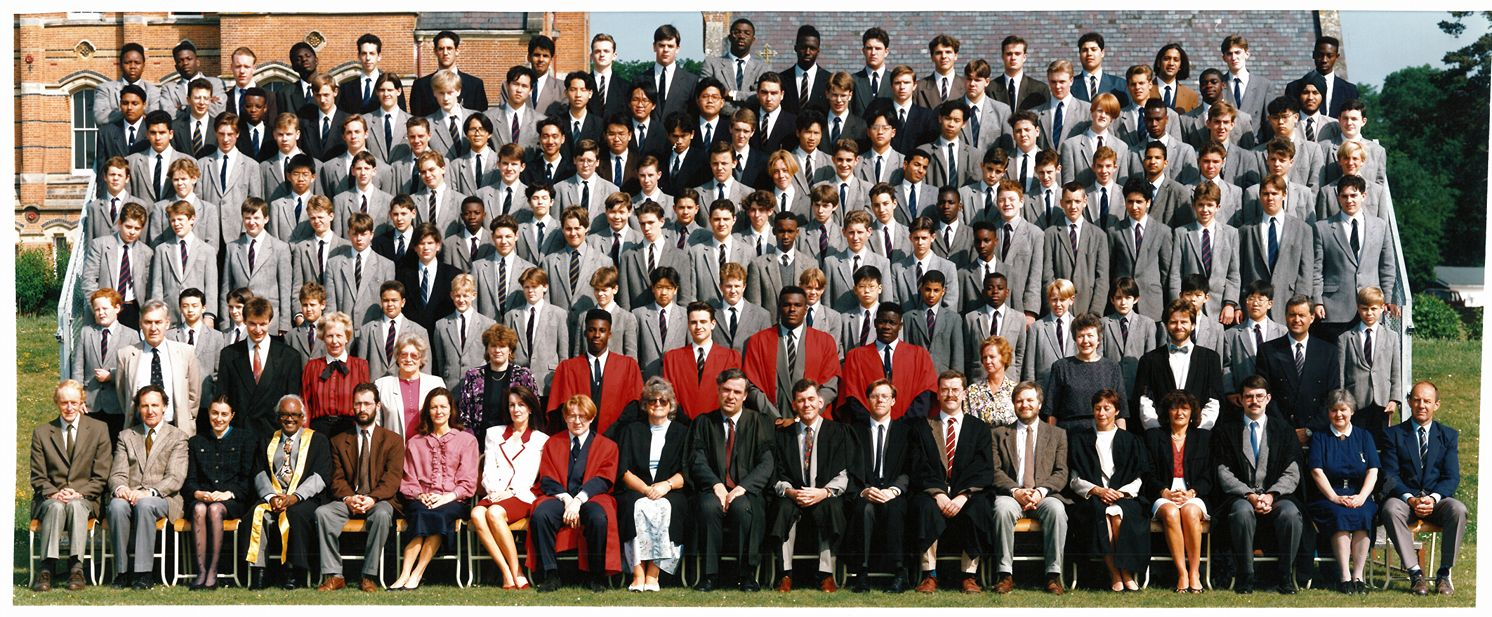
1992 – Staff & Pupils – Mayfield College, East Sussex

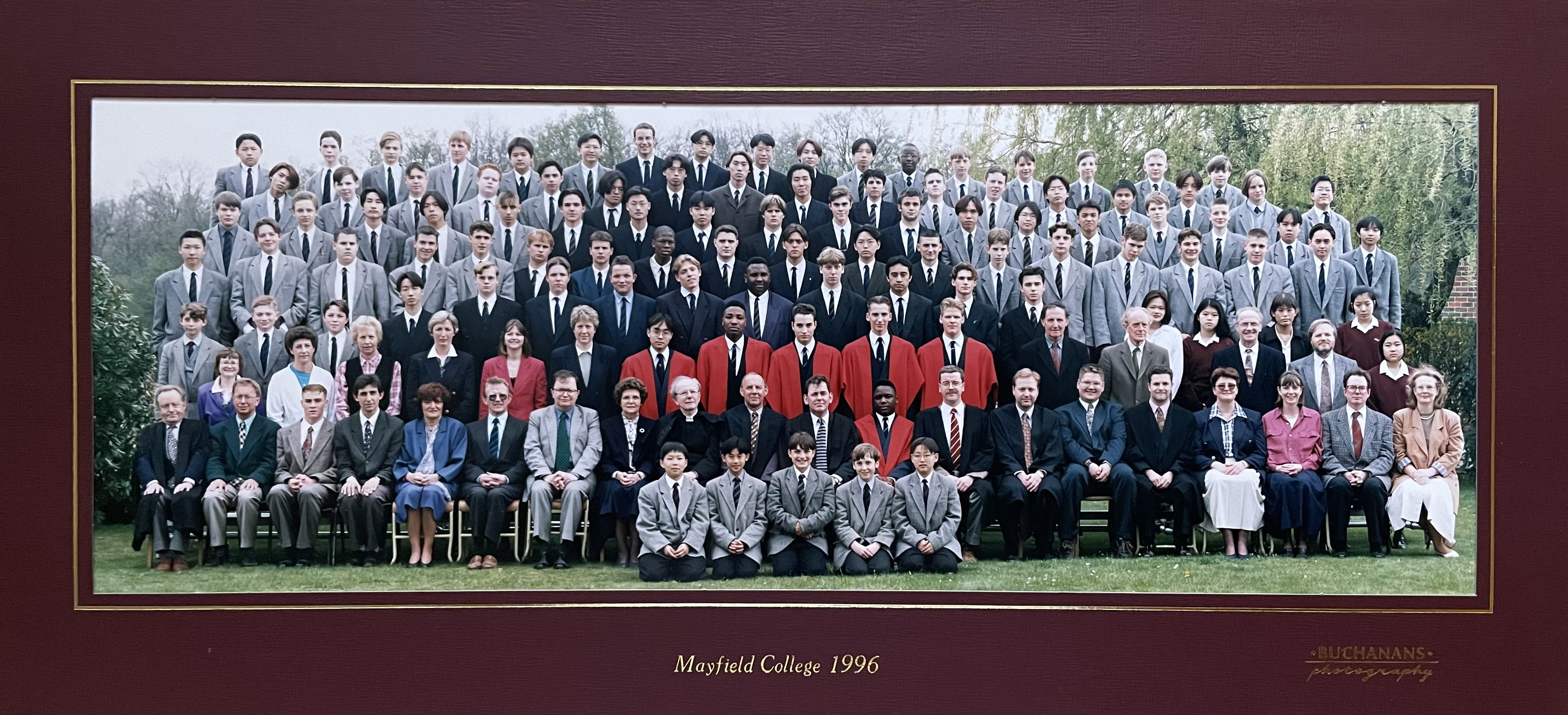
Official school photo – 1996

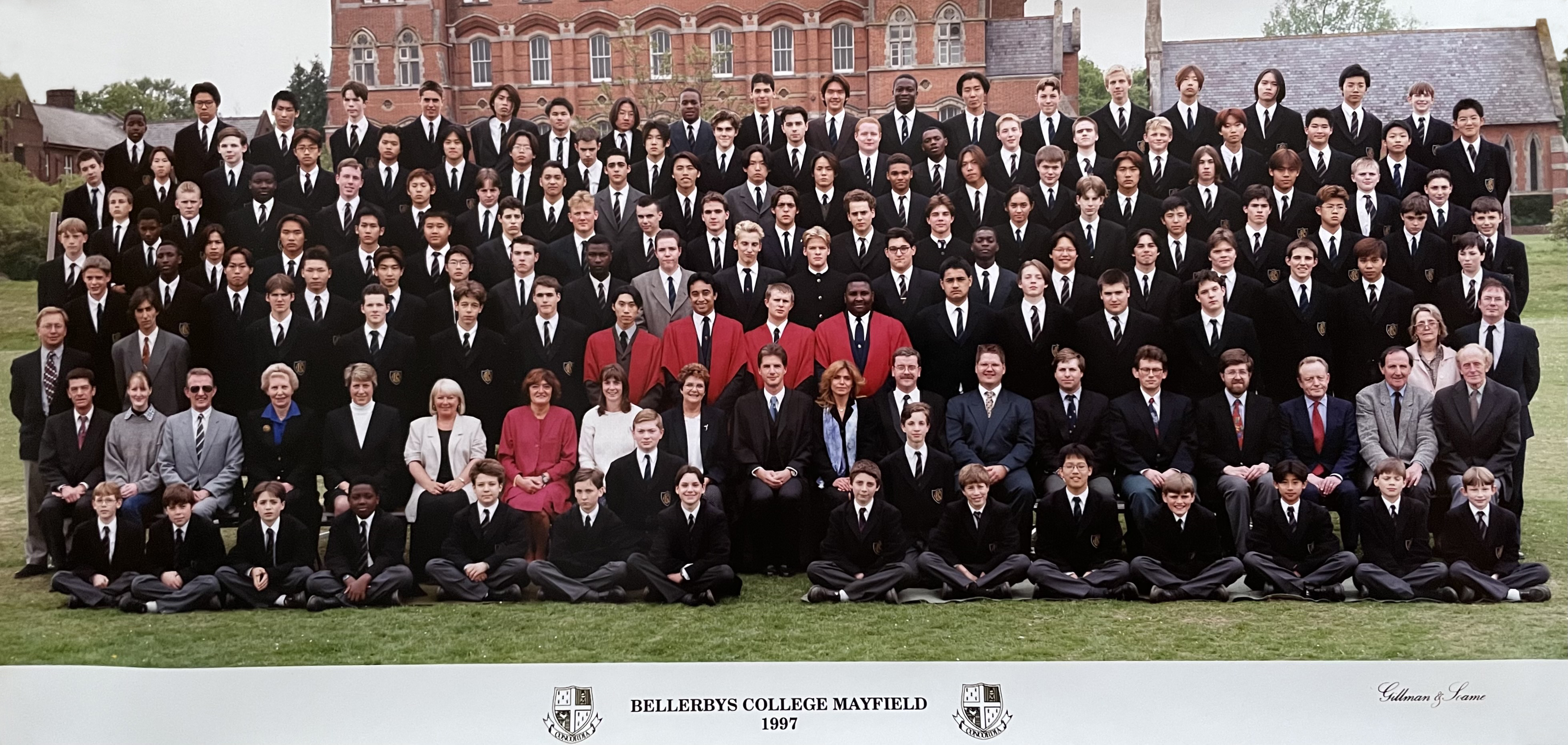
Official school photo – 1997

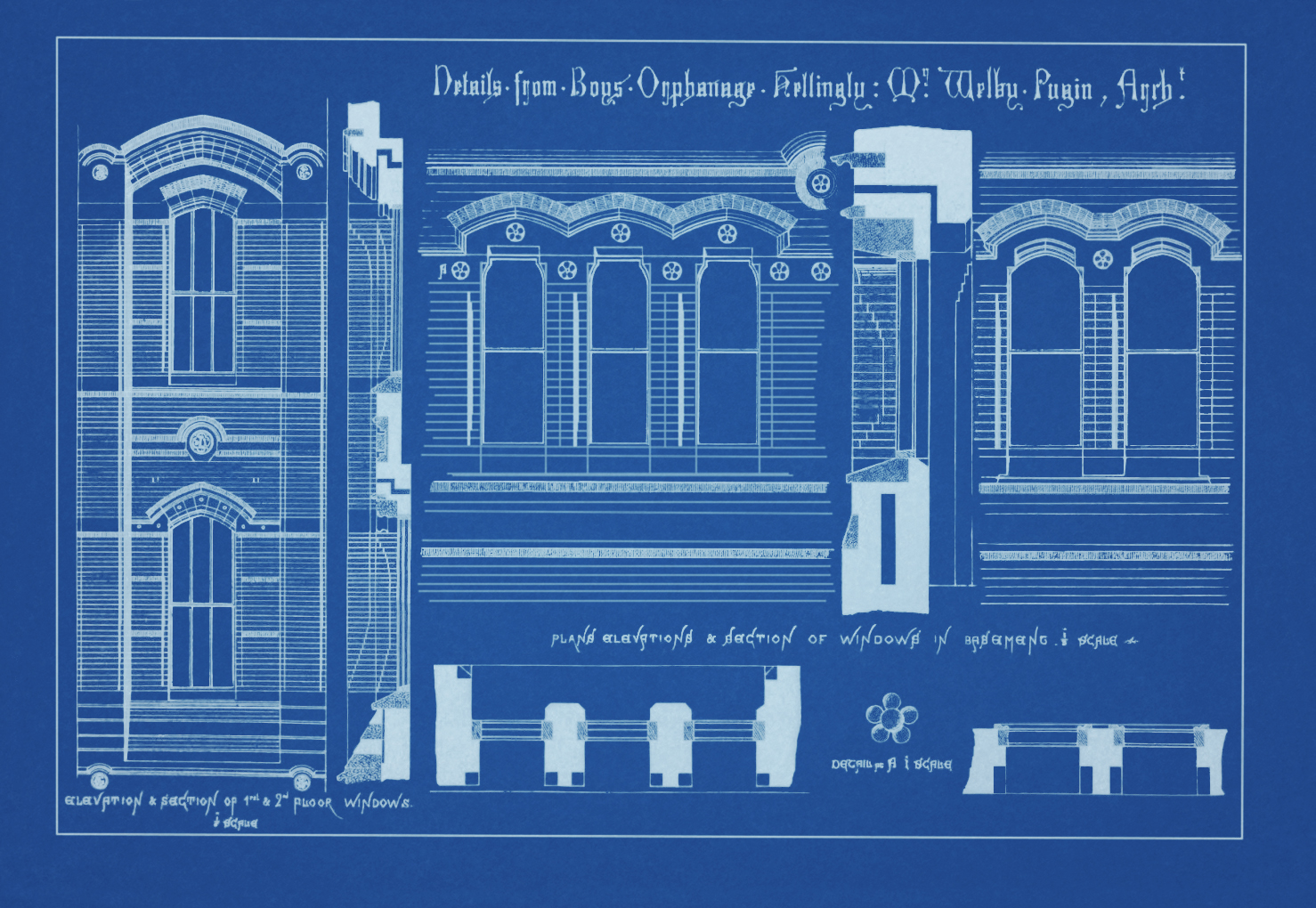
Window detail drawn by E. W. Pugin

== Notable alumni ==
- Reginald Denny (1891–1967), actor and aviator
- Michael Gwynn (1916–1976), actor
- Christopher Hammerbeck CB, CBE (b. 1943), former commanding officer of the 4th Armoured Brigade
- John Hine (1938–2024), Catholic bishop, Auxiliary Bishop in the Archdiocese of Southwark from 2001 to 2013 and titular bishop of Beverley
- Terence Kilmartin CBE (1922–1991), popular journalist
- John Laffin (1922–2000) (lay teaching staff), military historian
- Wale Ojo (b. 1964), actor
- Maurice Michael Stephens DFC, DSO (1919–2004), World War II flying ace
- Michael Strickland CMG, DSO, OBE, CstJ MM Star of Jordan (1913–1982), major-general and adviser to King Hussein of Jordan
