= Saint Francis Xavier College, Clapham =

Catholic school in South London, England

Coordinates: 51°27′6″N 0°8′57″W

Saint Francis Xavier Sixth Form College

Location
- 10 Malwood Road; London, SW12 8EN; United Kingdom

Information
- Type: Voluntary aided Sixth Form College
- Religious affiliation: Roman Catholic
- Established: 1985
- Local authority: Wandsworth
- Department for Education URN: 130422 Tables
- Ofsted: Reports
- Principal: Graham Thompson
- Gender: Mixed
- Age: 16 to 19
- Website: http://www.sfx.ac.uk/

Saint Francis Xavier College is a Roman Catholic sixth form college in South West London, England. It is located on the borders of Wandsworth and Lambeth close to Clapham South tube station. It offers courses for 16- to 19-year-olds, as well as Adult Education classes. As of 2018 there are about 1,300 enrolled students, the vast majority studying at Level 3.

== History ==
The college was established in 1985. It is named after Saint Francis Xavier. Graham Thompson is the current principal.

The college introduced the International Baccalaureate (IB) in September 2010. The IB Diploma is a qualification which was until recently, almost exclusively offered by independent schools in the UK.
