= Theodore Ryken =

Theodore James Ryken, CFX (né Theodoor Jacobus Rijken; 1797–1871) was a Dutch Catholic missionary who founded the Xaverian Brothers.

== Life ==
Theodore James Ryken was born August 30, 1797, in Heusden, the son of devout Catholics Antonius and Maria Anna Beels Rijken. Upon the death of his parents, he was raised by his maternal uncle. He had little formal education and was apprenticed to a shoemaker. At the age of nineteen, he became a Catechist, and later helped to run an orphanage.

Some years later there was an outbreak of cholera in Groningen. While helping to nurse the sick, Ryken contracted the disease and nearly died. He made a pilgrimage to Rome in 1826 and the following year entered a Trappist monastery in Germany but did not stay.

Ryken came to America in 1831, and remained for three years, serving as a catechist among the missions. His observations in the United States convinced him that Catholic teachers were needed, and, returning to Europe, he planned to establish a teaching institute.

In 1837, Ryken returned to the United States, where Joseph Rosati, Bishop of St. Louis, persuaded him to direct his efforts towards the instruction of the large number of immigrant children. Ryken's proposal received the written approval from seven bishops. He made a second pilgrimage to Rome in 1838, and then asked permission from Bishop François-René Boussen, of Bruges, to found a congregation. The bishop consented, but, before the actual foundation, required Ryken to pass a year's novitiate, which he fulfilled with the Redemptorists at Sint-Truiden.

The Brothers of St. Francis Xavier, or Xaverian Brothers were established at Bruges in 1839. The beginning was difficult, the founder having, with two or three companions, to struggle against disheartening obstacles. The group grew slowly, but a motherhouse was established on an estate in Bruges. Two primary schools were opened in the city. Some of the brothers acquired teacher training at the Normal school in Sint-Truiden. The rule for the new congregation was drafted by Ryken's confessor and counselor, Jesuit Father Isidore Van de Kerckhove, and approved by Bishop Boussen in 1841.

Ryken pronounced the vows of religion in 1846, taking the name Brother Francis Xavier. In 1848, a group of brothers went to England and opened schools in parishes in Bury and Manchester. In 1860, after holding the office of Superior General of the Xaverians for twenty-seven years, he was relieved of his duties on account of failing strength. Ryken lived out his final years working at the farm outside Bruges that supplied the school there with vegetables. At the time of his death on November 26, 1871, at the age of seventy-four, the Xaverians were firmly settled in Belgium, England, and the United States.

== Legacy ==
The Theodore James Ryken Award is bestowed every Founder's Day, the feast of St. Francis Xavier, by each Xaverian Brothers Sponsored School upon a member of its faculty or staff who exemplifies the Xaverian philosophy by participating in the school's community of faith.

Ryken Hall at Xavier High School in Middletown, Connecticut, houses the schools music suite, science labs and art wing.

The Ryken Studies Program at Our Lady of Good Counsel High School in Olney, Maryland, is a college preparatory program designed for students with mild learning differences.

A statue of Ryken stands outside St. Xavier High School in Louisville, Kentucky.

Xaverian College in Manchester has a building called 'Ryken' which houses their library.

St. Mary's Ryken High School in Leonardtown, Maryland, is named after Theodore James Ryken, and the school embraces the values of the Xavierian Brothers.

Saint John's High School in Shrewsbury, Massachusetts has Ryken Center which houses their library.

== Sources ==
- Charles VAN TOURNHOUT c.f.x., Brother Francis-Xavier Rijken. A life sketch, Baltimore, 1904.
- Charles VAN TOURNHOUT c.f.x., Fragments from the history of the Xaverian Brothers, Baltimore, 1911.
- Theodore James Rijken, in: Catholic Encyclopedia, 1913.
- Thomas SPALDING c.f.x., Theodore Rijken's 'Scheme of an establishment', in: The Rijken Quarterly, Baltimore, 1966.
- Jan DEVADDER c.f.x., Rooted in History. The life and times of T. J. Rijken, Founder of the Xaverian Brothers,
  - Volume I, The Vision, Brugge, 1986.
  - Volume II, The Test, Brugge, 1987.
