= Xaverian College =

College in Manchester, England

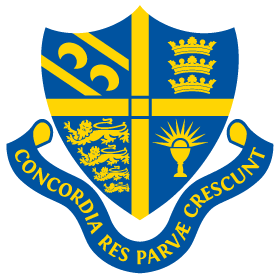

Location
- Lower Park Road; Rusholme, Manchester, M14 5RB; England; 53°27′18″N 2°13′23″W

Information
- Former name: The Catholic Collegiate Institute
- Type: Sixth Form College
- Motto: Concordia res parvae crescunt (In harmony, small things grow)
- Religious affiliation: Roman Catholic
- Established: 1977 - Xaverian Sixth Form College; 1945 - Xaverian Grammar School; 1862 - The Catholic Collegiate Institute, All Saints
- Founder: Congregation of Saint Francis Xavier
- Local authority: Manchester
- Department for Education URN: 130504 Tables
- Ofsted: Reports
- Principal: Anthony Knowles
- Gender: Coeducational
- Age: 16 to 19
- Enrolment: c. 2,500
- Colours: Blue, yellow, white
- Newspaper: The Manchester Xaverian
- Diocese: Salford
- Website: xaverian.ac.uk
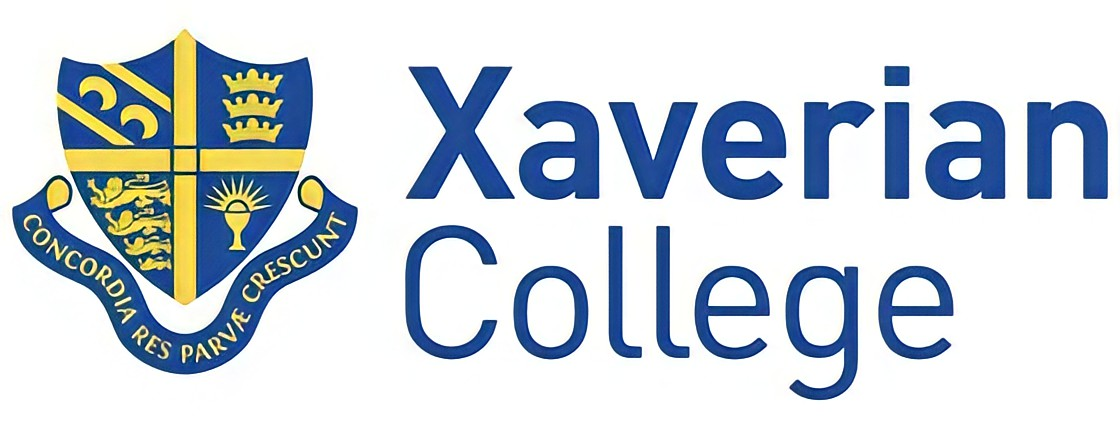

Xaverian College is a Roman Catholic college located in Rusholme, Manchester, England, approximately 2 miles (3.2 km) south of the city centre. Established in 1862, it is recognised as being one of the most oversubscribed sixth form colleges in Greater Manchester, along with Ashton Sixth Form College and Loreto College. As a member of the Association of Colleges, the college has an offer rate of 30% (2019).

The college is near the University of Manchester and the Royal Northern College of Music. Through its partnership with the University of Manchester, Xaverian College hosts foundational science courses on behalf of the university. Additionally, Xaverian College students benefit from access to the resources available at the University of Manchester Library.

== History ==
=== 1862–1976 ===
Francis Xavier was the basis of the Xaverian Brothers who would found numerous educational institutions around the world.

The Xaverian Brothers, or Congregation of St Francis Xavier (CFX), are a Roman Catholic religious order founded by Theodore James Ryken in Bruges, Belgium, in 1839 and named after St Francis Xavier. The order is dedicated to Roman Catholic education in the United Kingdom, the United States and many other countries.

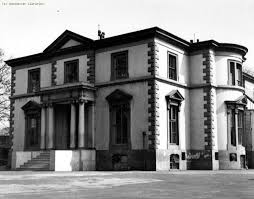
Ward Hall in 1960

The college was founded by the Xaverian Brothers in 1862 and until 1903 was housed in a four-storey building on Oxford Road, Manchester. On the move to the then gated Victoria Park, it was originally housed in a building known as Firwood, but over time, through new building projects and acquisition, the campus grew.

Firwood was home to the Brothers until 1993 when the last of them left. Another former house which has now become part of the college, Ward Hall, was used as a camp for American servicemen in the Second World War.

Mancunian Films, a motion picture production company, used the exterior of the college in several of their films, including It's a Grand Life, starring Frank Randle and Diana Dors. The film company sold their Dickenson Road Studios to the BBC in 1954, making Dickenson Road Studios the first regional BBC TV studio. When the BBC left in 1974 to move to Oxford Road, Xaverian inherited their lighting rigs, now used in the drama studio. From 1946 to 1977, the school was a direct grant grammar school.

=== 1977–present ===
The college was a Roman Catholic grammar school for boys until 1977, when it became a mixed sixth-form college. Direct grant grammar school status ended and Xaverian became a Sixth Form College for young men and women aged 16 to 19 within the Manchester Local Education Authority. In 1993, the college principal Mrs Quinn led an expansion in student numbers, refurbished and modernised many of the buildings and updated the curriculum with vocationally based courses and the introduction of information technology across many subjects. Her greatest success, however, was to maintain the distinctive Xaverian mission and ethos in a period of much change and uncertainty.

Capital from the Xaverian Brothers and grants from the Further Education Funding Council for England (FEFC) allowed a new multi-resource building, The Ryken, to be constructed in 2002. By 2005, the FEFC had become the Learning and Skills Council and recognised the college's progress by part funding a state-of-the-art new building, which was named Mayfield.

In 2007, Mary Hunter was made principal.

== Campus ==
The college consists of nine buildings on two sides of Lower Park Road: Ward Hall, Birtles, Marylands, Firwood, Xavier, Sunbury, Ryken, Mayfield, and Teresa Quinn built from 1840 onwards. Additions and renovations have been an ongoing feature of the campus's development, with Birtles a key example of this process. The Ryken and Mayfield buildings, added at the start of the 21st century, along with Teresa Quinn, opened in 2020, house information technology equipment. The Ryken building was named after one of the founders of the Xaverian order, Theodore James Ryken. The college buildings are around the perimeter of a central grassed area where sporting and social activities take place.

== Notable alumni ==
=== Sixth form college ===
- Caroline Aherne (1963–2016), actress and writer
- Peter Ash (b. 1985), actor
- Andrea Ashworth (b. 1969), writer and academic
- Afshan Azad (b. 1988), actress, best known for playing Padma Patil in the Harry Potter films
- Mani (1962-2025), musician, notably the bassist for The Stone Roses and Primal Scream
- Chris Ofili (b. 1968), painter and recipient of the Turner Prize
- Nedum Onuoha (b. 1986), former professional footballer and television pundit
- Lucy Powell (b. 1974), Deputy Leader of the Labour Party and MP for Manchester Central
- Wunmi Mosaku (b. 1986), actress

=== Grammar school ===
- Chris Buckley (1886–1973), footballer
- Anthony Burgess (1917–1993), author, poet, composer; A Clockwork Orange
- Denis Carter, Baron Carter (1932–2006), agriculturalist and politician
- James Cunningham (1910–1974), Bishop of Hexham and Newcastle, 1958–74
- Augustine Hailwood (1875–1939), Conservative MP for Manchester Ardwick, 1916–1922
- Martin Hannett (1948–1991), record producer, musician, and co-founder of Factory Records
- Peter Hebblethwaite (1930–1994), Jesuit priest, writer, and journalist
- Bernard Hill (1944–2024), actor
- Major Henry Kelly (VC) (1887–1960), recipient of the Victoria Cross
- Bernard Longley (b. 1955), Roman Catholic Archbishop of Birmingham from 2009
- Gary Mounfield, (b. 1962) musician, member of The Stone Roses
- Desmond Williams, architect
- Tim Willocks (b. 1957), doctor and novelist

== See also ==
- Listed buildings in Manchester-M14
- List of direct grant grammar schools
