= List of Old Edwardians (Sheffield) =

This is a list of some notable alumni of King Edward VII School, Sheffield, and its various predecessor schools, arranged roughly chronologically.

== Sheffield Grammar School, later Sheffield Royal Grammar School (1604–1905) ==
- John Balguy (1686–1748), divine and philosopher
- John Roebuck FRS (1718–1794), inventor known for developing the industrial-scale manufacture of sulfuric acid
- Sir Samuel Gillott (1838–1913), lawyer and politician, Lord Mayor of Melbourne
- Walter Sugg (1860–1933), first-class cricketer
- Robert Murray Gilchrist (1867–1917), novelist and author of regional interest books about the Peak District
- W. S. Senior (1876–1938), scholar, poet and member of the Church Missionary Society
- Edward Keble Chatterton (1878–1944), prolific author on maritime and naval themes
- Ludwig Glauert (1879–1963), paleontologist, herpetologist and museum curator
- William Andrew MC (1884–1963), Anglican priest
- Charles Sargeant Jagger MC (1885–1934), sculptor on the theme of war, best known for his war memorials
- Kenneth Kirk (1886–1954), Bishop of Oxford

== Sheffield Collegiate School (1836–1884) ==
- Henry Clifton Sorby (1826–1908), microscopist and geologist
- George Rolleston FRS (1829–1881), physician and zoologist, Linacre Professor of Anatomy and Physiology at Oxford
- Sir Nathaniel Creswick (1831–1917), footballer and solicitor, co-founded Sheffield FC
- Henry Jackson OM (1839–1921), classicist, Regius Professor of Greek at Cambridge
- Henry Arnold Favell (1845–1896), Anglican priest, Archdeacon of Sheffield
- George William Kinman (1862–1927), Headmaster of Hertford Grammar School

== Wesley College (1838–1905) ==
- Joseph Bennett (1829–1908), merchant and Liberal politician
- Samuel Danks Waddy (1830–1902), politician and MP
- Angus Holden, 1st Baron Holden (1833–1912), Liberal Party politician and MP
- Joseph Ruston (1835–1897), engineer, manufacturer, Liberal Party politician
- Sir Swire Smith (1842–1918), woollen manufacturer, educationalist and Liberal Party politician
- Frederick Cawley, 1st Baron Cawley (1850–1937), businessman and Liberal Party politician
- Leonard Cockayne FRS (1855–1934), New Zealand botanist
- Frank Wilson (1859–1918), Premier of Western Australia
- Arthur Neal (1862–1933), politician and Liberal MP
- Cecil Wilson (1862–1945), pacifist Labour Party MP

== King Edward VII School (1905–present) ==
- Ephraim Lipson (1888–1960), economic historian
- Hermann Glauert (1892–1934), aerodynamicist, who developed the Prandtl–Glauert transformation
- Harry Epworth Allen (1894–1958), English painter
- Edward Charles Titchmarsh (1899–1963) – FRS, Oxford Mathematician, and Savilian Professor of Geometry
- Geoffrey Gledhill Turner (1904–59), GC GM
- Frank Ellis (1905–2006) – eminent radiation oncologist
- Edward Linfoot (1905–82), Astronomer. Assistant Director of the Observatory, University of Cambridge 1948–70
- Prof Albert Goodwin (1906–95), Professor of Modern History at the University of Manchester from 1953 to 1969
- Revd Hugh Turner, Anglican priest, theologian, and academic
- Sir Charles Husband CBE (1908–83), civil engineer, President of the Institution of Structural Engineers from 1964 to 1965, and Chairman of the Association of Consulting Engineers from 1967 to 1968, and designed the Lovell Telescope at Jodrell Bank Observatory
- Major Lionel Wigram, (1907–1944) was a British soldier, who played a significant part in developing British infantry fighting tactics in World War 2, killed in action in Italy
- Rt Rev Leslie Stradling (1908–1998), Bishop of Johannesburg 1961–1974
- Sir Harold Warris Thompson CBE (1908–1983) – English physical chemist; Chairman of the Football Association
- Sir Eric Gardner Turner CBE (1911–1983), papyrologist and classicist
- Philip Allen, Baron Allen of Abbeydale CB (1912–2007) – British civil servant
- Sir Geofroy Tory (1912–2012), Ambassador to Ireland from 1964 to 1967
- Brigadier Sir Edgar "Bill" Williams (1912–1995) – academic and warrior
- Gordon Nornable MC (1915–2002) won the Military Cross and Croix de Guerre in 1944 fighting with the French Maquis in eastern France.
- Sir Peter Youens (1916–2000) – British administrator in Nyasaland and Malawi, and director of Lonrho
- Sir Robert Scholey (1921–2014), Bob Scholey, known as 'Black Bob', deputy chairman and chief executive of British Steel (1976–1986), Chairman of British Steel (1986–1992), succeeding Sir Robert Haslam
- Peter Jaffrey Wheatley (1921–1997), chemist and Cambridge academic
- John Gatenby Bolton (1922–1993) – British-Australian astronomer
- Prof Donald Nicol (1923–2003), Koraës Professor of Modern Greek and Byzantine History, Language and Literature at King's College London from 1970 to 1988, and President of the Ecclesiastical History Society from 1975 to 1976
- Prof Raymond Ian Page (1924–2012), Elrington and Bosworth Professor of Anglo-Saxon at Cambridge University from 1984 to 1991, and Parker Librarian at the Parker Library, Corpus Christi College
- Michael James Farrell (1926–1975), British economist
- Prof Adrian Horridge (born 1927) – FRS, neurobiologist, professor at Australian National University
- Prof John Philipps Kenyon (1927–96), Joyce and Elizabeth Hall Distinguished Professor in Early Modern British History at the University of Kansas from 1987 to 1994
- Francis Cheetham OBE (1928–2005), museum curator
- Sir Michael Carlisle (born 1929) – Pro-Chancellor, University of York
- John Farnsworth Wright (1929–2001) was a British economist and Fellow of Trinity College, Oxford.
- Peter Landin (1930–2009), computer scientist and academic at Queen Mary College, London
- David Law (1930–?), British athlete
- John Lemmon (1930–1966) – logician and philosopher
- Sir Norman Adsetts OBE (born 1931) Knight Bachelor, OBE – Hon Life President SIG plc since 1996
- Dick Charlesworth (1932–2008), jazz clarinettist and bandleader
- Prof Ian Fells CBE (born 1932) – Professor of Energy Conversion at The University of Newcastle upon Tyne, and President of the Institute of Energy from 1978 to 1979, and broadcaster
- George MacBeth (1932–1992) – Poet and author
- Alan Jinkinson (born 1935), General Secretary of UNISON from 1993 to 1996
- Prof David Downes (born 1938), Professor of Social Administration at the LSE from 1987 to 2003, and Editor of the British Journal of Criminology from 1985 to 1990
- Ted Wragg (1938–2005) – E C (Ted) Wragg, Professor of Education at the University of Exeter
- Ian Strachan MBE AFC FRAeS (born 1938) RAF Chief Test Pilot at Farnborough and founder Chairman of the International GPS Flight Recorder Approval Committee
- Sir Eric Dancer KCVO CBE JP (born 1940), Managing Director of Dartington Crystal from 1986 to 2000, and Lord Lieutenant of Devon 1998–2015
- Ted Powell (1940–2005), amateur footballer who went on to coach the Malawi national football team and the England Under–18 side which won the European Championship in 1993.
- Rony Robinson (born 1940) – writer and broadcaster
- Dave Sheasby (1940–2010), playwright, director, dramatist and radio producer
- Sir John Goulden CMG (born 1941) – diplomat and Ambassador to Turkey from 1992 to 1995, and subsequently to NATO.
- Alan Wood (born 1947) – CEO of Siemens Plc
- Roy Galley (born 1947) – Conservative MP for Halifax from 1983 to 1987
- John Ramsden (1947–2009), Professor of History at Queen Mary College, an authority on the history of the Conservative party
- Bob Davies (born 1948) – CEO of Arriva Plc until April 2006
- Prof Paul Collier CBE (born 1949), Professor of Economics at the University of Oxford since 1993, and Director since 1991 of the Centre for the Study of African Economies
- Peter Horbury (born 1950), car designer, Executive Design Director of all Ford's American brands from 2004
- Martin Smith (born 1949) – Car designer (Porsche, Audi, Ford)
- Clive Betts (born 1950) – Current Labour MP
- Air Commodore Jon Chitty (born c. 1952), OBE RAF
- Dr David Thomson, current Bishop of Huntingdon
- Geoff Nicholson (born 1953) – Novelist and non-fiction writer
- Phil Oakey (born 1955) – singer, The Human League
- Martyn Ware (born 1956), founder member of The Human League and Heaven 17
- Simon Collis (born 1956), Ambassador to Syria since 2007, and to Qatar from 2005 to 2007. Currently the United Kingdom's Ambassador to Iraq.
- Matthew Bannister (born 1957) – British radio administrator and broadcaster
- John Rawling (born 1957) - Sports journalist and broadcaster
- Simon Wessely (born 1956) – professor of epidemiological and liaison psychiatry at the Institute of Psychiatry, King's College London and Director of the King's Centre for Military Health Research.
- Bruce Dickinson (born 1958) – Lead singer in Iron Maiden and professional pilot
- Graham Fellows (born 1959) – comedian and actor whose alter egos include John Shuttleworth, Jilted John
- Carl Shutt (born 1961) – former Sheffield Wednesday, Leeds United and Bradford City footballer
- Paul Heaton (born 1962) – leader, The Beautiful South and The Housemartins
- Julia Bradbury (born 1970) – presenter of Watchdog
- Emily Maitlis (born 1970) – main presenter of BBC's Newsnight programme
- Tyrone Thompson (born 1981) – footballer with Torquay United
- Ben Purkiss (born 1984) – footballer with Oxford United
- Toddla T (born 1985) – musician and DJ
- Elizabeth Henstridge (born 1987) – Actor in Agents of S.H.I.E.L.D.
- Miriam Cates (born 1982) - Ex-Member of the United Kingdom Parliament for Penistone and Stocksbridge from December 2019 - July 2024

== See also ==
- Category:People educated at King Edward VII School, Sheffield
