= King Edward VII School =

King Edward VII may refer to the following schools:

== England ==
- King Edward VII School (King's Lynn), King's Lynn, Norfolk
- King Edward VII and Queen Mary School, Lytham St Anne's, Lancashire
- King Edward VII School, Sheffield, Sheffield, South Yorkshire
- King Edward VII School, Melton Mowbray, Melton Mowbray, Leicestershire

== Other places ==
- King Edward VII School, Johannesburg, Johannesburg, Gauteng, South Africa
- King Edward VII School, Taiping, Taiping, Perak, Malaysia

== See also ==
- King Edward's School (disambiguation)
