= Geoffrey Turner =

Geoffrey Turner may refer to:

- Geoffrey Turner (GC) (1903–1959), British naval officer and recipient of the George Cross
- Geoffrey Turner (bishop) (born 1934), bishop of the Church of England
- Geoffrey Turner (athlete) (1907–1932), British athlete
- Geoff Turner (1928–2017), Australian rules footballer
