= Old Edwardians =

Old Edwardians (OE) are old boys/girls of schools with Edward in the name of the school. It is also used to refer to Old Etonians.

Schools called King Edward's School or similar names include:

- King Edward VI Aston
- King Edward's School, Birmingham
- King Edward VI Five Ways
- King Edward VI Handsworth
- King Edward's School, Bath
- King Edward VI School, Southampton
- King Edward VII School, Sheffield
- King Edward VII School (Johannesburg)
- St Edward's College, Liverpool
- St Edward's College, Birgu, Malta
- St. Edward's Secondary School in Sierra Leone.

== See also ==
- List of Old Edwardians (Sheffield)
