= David McLellan (colonial administrator) =

David McLellan CMG
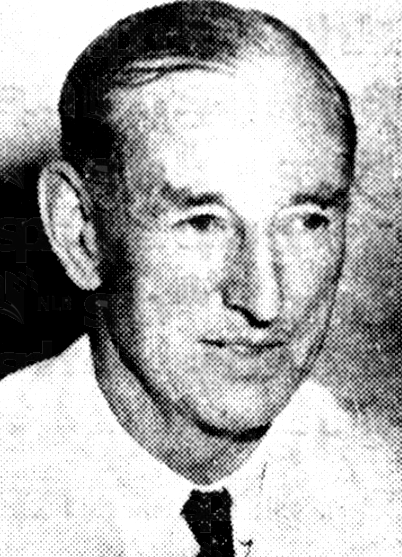
- McLellan in 1953
- Born: 23 December 1904
- Died: 5 October 1982 (aged 77)
- Education: Queens' College, Cambridge
- Occupation: Colonial administrator
- Children: 3

David McLellan (23 December 1904 – 5 October 1982) was a British civil servant and colonial administrator who was Director of Education and Permanent Secretary to the Ministry of Education in the Colony of Singapore during the 1950s.

== Early life and education ==
McLellan was born on 23 December 1904, the eldest son of David McLellan. He was educated at King Edward VII School, Lytham and Queens' College, Cambridge.

== Career ==
McLellan entered the colonial education service and went to Hong Kong in 1931. Spending over 20 years in the Hong Kong Education Department, he rose to Chief Inspector of Schools in 1951. In 1953, he transferred to Singapore where he first took up the post of Deputy Director of Education, and was appointed a member of the Legislative Council. From 1955 to 1958, he served as both Director of Education, Singapore, and Permanent Secretary to the Ministry of Education.

While in office, McLellan faced many challenges during a turbulent period which saw unrest in Chinese schools and a lack of resources to cope with a rapid increase in demand for education services. In 1954, he told the Straits Times, "We shall need every teacher we can train and almost every school we can build if we are to become within measurable distance of coping with our problems." To address discontent in Chinese schools, he substantially increased government aid enabling them to increase teacher salaries and introduced bilingual education. He also had to manage the response to rioting by Chinese students and school closures following the introduction of the National Service Ordinance. In 1955, Chew Swee Kee was appointed the first minister of education and headed a committee established to investigate the situation in Chinese schools.

After his retirement from the education service in Singapore in 1958 under the Malayanisation scheme, McLellan served as Regional Education Adviser to the Commissioner General for the United Kingdom in South East Asia from 1959 to 1962 and then Director of Cultural Relations at SEATO at Bangkok from 1963 to 1965.

After retiring from government service, McLellan worked as an education consultant at the International Bank for Reconstruction and Development from 1965 to 1969.

== Personal life and death ==
McLellan married Winifred, née Henderson, in 1934 and they had three sons. He was a keen cricketer and "a mainstay" of Hong Kong's Cricket Club team.

McLellan died on 5 October 1982, aged 77.

== Honours ==
McLellan was appointed Companion of the Order of St Michael and St George (CMG) in the 1957 Birthday Honours.

== See also ==
- Education in Singapore
