= King Edward's School =

King Edward's School or King Edward VI School may refer to:

== In England ==
=== Edward VI ===
- Foundation of the Schools of King Edward VI, Birmingham, West Midlands:
  - Independent schools:
    - King Edward's School, Birmingham (boys)
    - King Edward VI High School for Girls
  - Non-fee paying grammar schools:
    - King Edward VI Aston School (boys)
    - King Edward VI Camp Hill School for Boys
    - King Edward VI Camp Hill School for Girls
    - King Edward VI Five Ways School (co-educational)
    - King Edward VI Handsworth School (girls)
  - State-funded Academy:
    - King Edward VI Sheldon Heath Academy
- King Edward VI Grammar School, Chelmsford, Essex
- King Edward's School, Bath, Somerset
- King Edward VI School, Bury St Edmunds, Suffolk
- King Edward VI School, Lichfield, Staffordshire
- King Edward VI High School, Stafford, Staffordshire.
- King Edward VI Grammar School, Louth, Lincolnshire
- The King Edward VI School, Morpeth, Northumberland
- King Edward VI College, Nuneaton, Warwickshire, formerly King Edward VI Grammar School
- King Edward VI School, Southampton, Hampshire
- King Edward VI Grammar School, Spilsby, Lincolnshire: see King Edward VI Academy
- King Edward VI College, Stourbridge
- King Edward VI School, Stratford-upon-Avon, Warwickshire - which William Shakespeare attended
- King Edward's School, Witley, near Godalming in Surrey
- King Edward's School, Yeovil, Somerset
- King Edward VI Community College, Totnes, Devon
- Christ's Hospital, Horsham, West Sussex
- Norwich School in Norwich, Norfolk, previously King Edward VI's Grammar School
- Retford King Edward VI Grammar School, Retford, Nottinghamshire
  - Now known as Retford Oaks Academy
- Sherborne School, Dorset, also known as King Edward's School

=== Edward VII ===
- King Edward VII School, King's Lynn, Norfolk
- King Edward VII School, Lytham
- King Edward VII and Queen Mary School, Lytham
- King Edward VII School, Melton Mowbray, Leicestershire
- King Edward VII School, Sheffield, South Yorkshire
- King Edward VII Science and Sport College (formerly King Edward VII Grammar School), Leicestershire

== Elsewhere ==
- King Edward Public School, Toronto, Canada
- King Edward High School, former name of GIC Deoria, India
- King Edward Technical College, Dunedin, New Zealand
- King Edward VII School (Taiping), Taiping, Perak, Malaysia
- King Edward VII School (Johannesburg) in Gauteng, South Africa
- King Edward High School, a semi-private high school, Matatiele, Eastern Cape, South Africa.
