= Francis Ernest Brown =

Francis Ernest Brown (1869–1939) was headmaster of Geelong Church of England Grammar School, Victoria, Australia from 1912 until his retirement in 1929.

== Biography ==
Brown was born on 12 March 1869 in Bristol. He attended Bristol Grammar School where he was head boy, followed by Hertford College, Oxford. He graduated in 1892 and became senior mathematics master at Hulme Grammar School in Manchester. He was then appointed senior mathematics master at King Edward VII School, Sheffield in 1905; in 1908 he succeeded H J Chaytor as second master until 1911. In 1912 he took up the headmastership of Geelong Church of England Grammar school, Victoria.

He was ordained in 1896; on his return to England in 1929 he was rector of Preston Bagot, Warwickshire, until 1934. He died in Ampney St Peter, Gloucestershire, on 1 June 1939, leaving a wife and five children.
