= Bob Davies (businessman) =

British businessman

Robert J. Davies was the chief executive of Arriva PLC from 1998 to 2006.

Davies attended King Edward VII School in Sheffield, going on to graduate with a degree in law from the University of Edinburgh. He is a Fellow of the Chartered Institute of Management Accountants and holds an honorary doctorate (LLD) from the University of Sunderland.

In 1998, he was named chief executive of Arriva, a position he held until 2006. In July 2012, he was appointed Chairman of Home Group.
