= John Farnsworth Wright =

British economist

- Born: October 15, 1929; Sheffield, United Kingdom
- Died: November 19, 2001 (aged 72); United Kingdom
- Education: The Queen's College, Oxford
- Occupations: Economist, Tutor
- Known for: Economic theory and history
- Notable work: Book - Britain in the Age of Economic Management
- Spouse: Jean
- Children: 2

John Farnsworth Wright (15 October 1929 – 19 November 2001) was a British economist. He published the book Britain in the Age of Economic Management. He was a skeptic on government interventions in the economy.

He was born in Sheffield in 1929 and educated at King Edward VII School, specialising in mathematics and physics for which he won a Hastings Scholarship to The Queen's College, Oxford, in 1947. Wright then spent two years in the National Service in the Royal Army Educational Corps, and it was during this time that he studied philosophy, politics, and economics. He then began at Nuffield College, Oxford in 1952 as an early student.

He was appointed Fellow of Trinity College, Oxford, in 1953; he was Tutor in Economics 1953–1990, Official Fellow 1955–1957, Estates Bursar 1955–1997, and became an Emeritus Fellow in 1998.
