= Lower Don Valley =

Area of Sheffield, South Yorkshire, England

Coordinates: 53.405°N 1.417°W

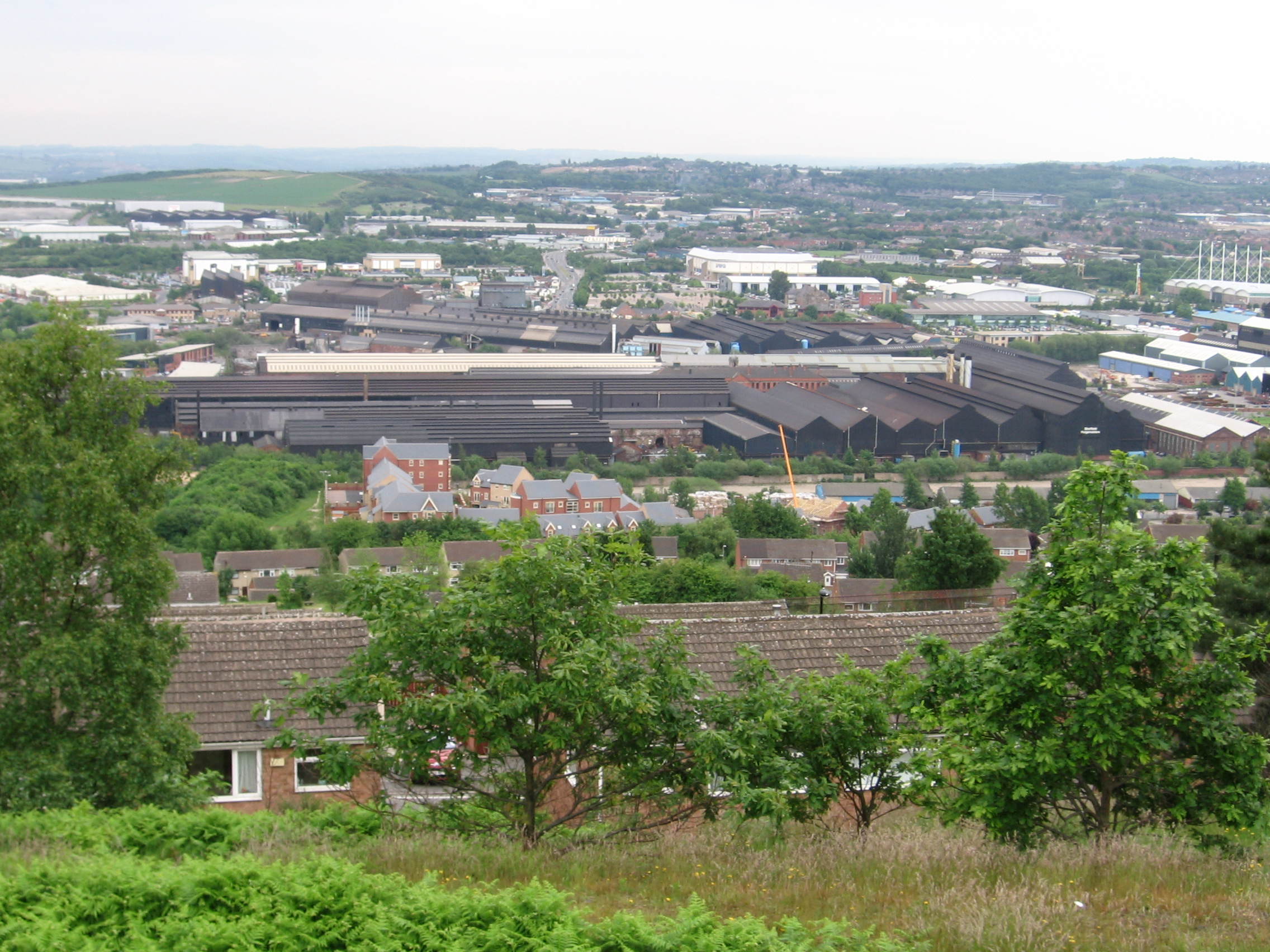
View of the Don Valley from Wincobank Fort

The Lower Don Valley, or historically the East End of Sheffield, is the mainly industrial north-east quarter of Sheffield, England. Located on the River Don, it encompasses the areas of Attercliffe, Brightside, Darnall, Tinsley and Wincobank.

The area became the heart of Sheffield's steel industry during the 19th and 20th century. However it went into decline during the 1970s and 1980s as the nature of steel manufacture changed from large industrial sites with large scale employment to more streamlined and automated manufacture. As a result, large areas were derelict by the end of the 1980s despite the steel industry continuing to increase production and the Sheffield Development Corporation were given the task of redeveloping the area.

Among the new developments are Meadowhall shopping centre, Valley Centertainment and Sheffield Arena. A public footpath, the Five Weirs Walk, has been opened up along the banks of the river from the city centre, and the Sheffield Supertram provides light rail access. It is home to one of the highest concentrations of sporting facilities in the UK with the Olympic Legacy Park, incorporating iceSheffield and the English Institute of Sport - Sheffield, located in the area.
