= Autism Plus =

Autism charity in England

- Formation: 1986
- Headquarters: Sheffield, South Yorkshire, England
- Leader: Philip Bartey
- Staff: 450
- Volunteers: 80
- Website: www.autismplus.co.uk

Autism Plus is a charity in England, United Kingdom. An Autism specialist charity, they offer support to adults and young people with autism, learning disabilities and mental health conditions.

Autism Plus support includes residential and supported living, adult learning, community outreach, employment support and social enterprises. Autism Plus is an autism specialist, but understanding many people with Autism often have another condition, they changed their name to recognise this, the 'Plus' in the name signifies they support people with autism and other complex conditions.

== History ==
Autism Plus was started in 1986 by a group of parents with autistic children under the name of Thorne House Autistic Community. Thorne House initially provided services for a small number of young adults who were leaving special schools in the local area as no appropriate adult provision was available. Since then the charity has grown considerably and now provides a diversity of services throughout Yorkshire to many people affected by autism and related conditions.

In 2006, Thorne House Services for Autism changed its name to Autism Plus. This was to show that they support people with a wider range of disabilities and focus on caring for each person as a whole. The name also recognizes that many autistic people have other conditions, making it important to provide the right kind of support and extra help beyond basic care.

In 2006 Philip Bartey was appointed chief executive. With a background in marketing Philip has worked in the food and drink industry for Cadbury Schweppes, Harveys of Bristol the sherry and port shippers and other Allied Lyons group companies. He was also on the board of a family business in Hull, a non executive director of the Harvest Housing Group in Manchester and a founder Trustee of Cancer Bridge Ltd (later St Camillus) in Hexham that later merged with Maggies Centres. He was chief executive for Leonard Cheshire Services in Northumbria based in Newcastle during the early 1990s.

In April 2009 Norman Adsetts was appointed as chairman.

In November 2011 Deputy Prime Minister Nick Clegg attended a dinner held by Autism Plus at The Cutlers Hall, Sheffield to talk about the 'Heart Attack' in the British Economy. He praised the work of Autism Plus and The Adsetts Partnership led by Sir Norman Adsetts OBE for their commitment to partnership and to creating employment through the creation of social enterprise and open employment placements.

== The Adsetts Partnership ==
Autism Plus are founder members of The Adsetts Partnership. A number of medium-sized voluntary sector providers operating in the north of England which have come together under the umbrella The Adsetts Partnership to work collaboratively. Member organisations are drawn from a range of sectors - social care, health care, education, employment, BME.

== Patrons ==
Simon Weston O.B.E. became patron of Autism Plus in 2010. Earl and Countess of Scarbrough are also patrons of the Autism Plus Future Plus Appeal.
