= Rony Robinson =

British writer

Rony Robinson (born 24 December 1940) is an English writer, educationalist and Sony Award-winning BBC Radio Sheffield daytime presenter.

Rony in the Garden

His novels include: The Ted Carp Tradition (Hodder), The Beano (Faber). His plays include Snapshots (Theatre Royal, Stratford East), Events in an Upper Room (Belgrade, Coventry and ICA) and the Sony Award-winning Last Loves on BBC Radio 4.

== Childhood and education ==
Born John Goronwy Robinson, he was educated at All Saints Church of England Primary School and King Edward VII School. He won a scholarship to Keble College, Oxford, where he studied history. While he was at Oxford he was the Editor of the weekly University newspaper Cherwell. He also gained a Diploma of Education.

== Working life and early writing ==
Rony(front right) with his brothers Dave (front middle) and Gethin (front right), with their parents

Robinson taught English at two large inner-city London comprehensive schools, Eltham Green school and, as head of department, Sedgehill. He wrote a number of text and source books for the New English in the 1960s.

He published his first novel in 1971 and has been a full-time writer since 1974.

== Writing and broadcasting ==
Twice resident playwright at Sheffield's Crucible Theatre and once each at the Theatre Royal Stratford East and Deptford Green School, Robinson has had over a hundred plays produced all over the country. He has written stories and plays and poems for young people: most successfully with Down Your Way (Nelson), A Time of Bears (Macmillan) and I Want Doesn't Get (Faber). His The Beano has been adapted for various stage performances broadcast by the BBC and published in the United States.

As a broadcaster, Robinson has presented a daily show on BBC Radio Sheffield uninterrupted since 1984. For the BBC network, he has written and voiced various documentaries and scripted seven radio and one television play.

His children's poetry includes the much anthologised We've Got A Wawa at Our House. He lives in Totley and plays and writes songs for the autoharp. He has had a lifelong interest in the revolutionary poet Edward Carpenter (1844–1929) who lived near Sheffield, about whom he has written in two of his plays, including "Edward Carpenter Lives!" and also appearing in a number of his novels.

In 1999, he received an honorary doctorate from Sheffield Hallam University. He is a supporter of Sheffield United F.C.
