= AKS Lytham =

Coordinates: 53.741°N 3.010°W

AKS Lytham School
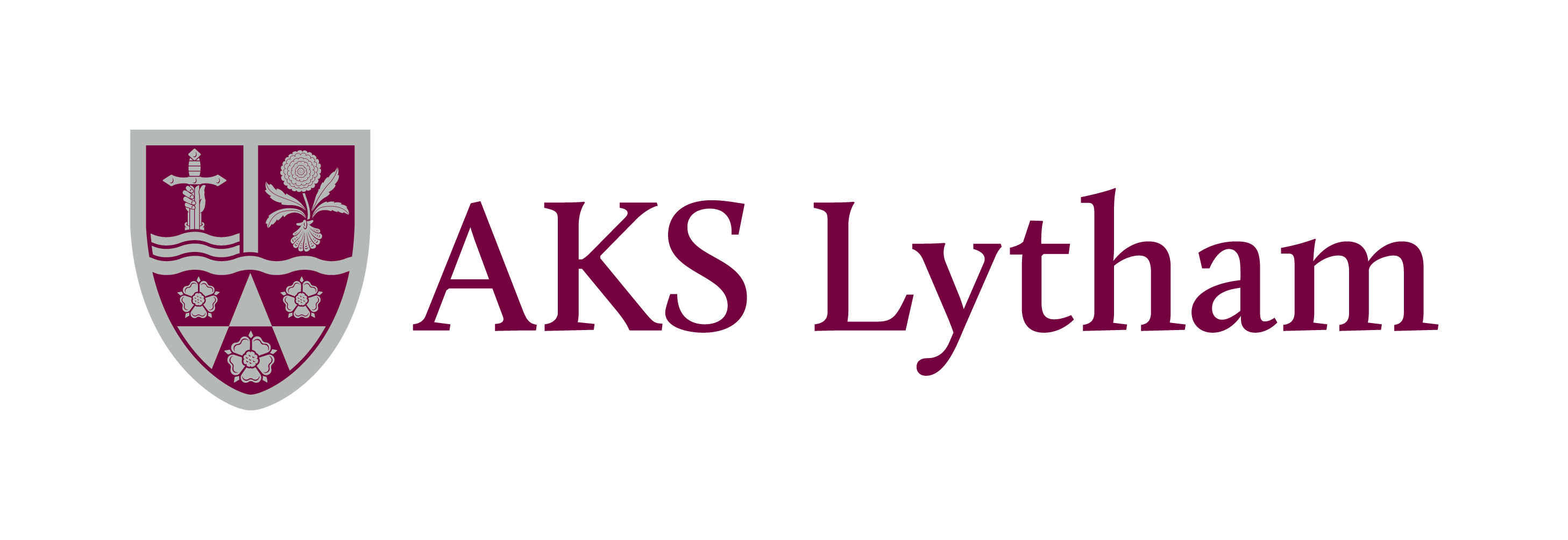

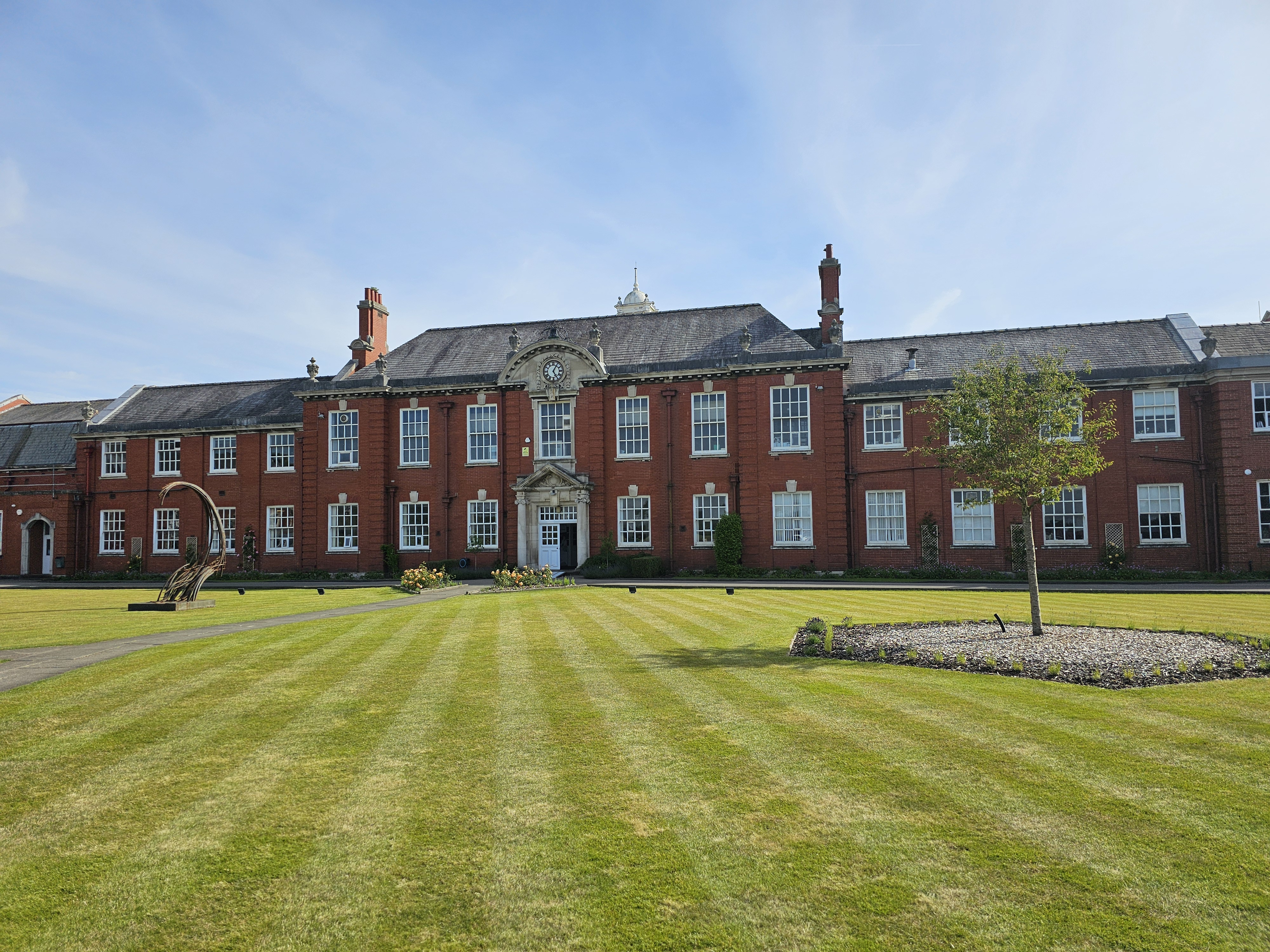
- Front entrance to Senior School

Location
- Clifton Drive South; Lytham St Annes, Lancashire, FY8 1DT; England

Information
- Funding type: Private day school
- Motto: Change your world, Achieve your ambition, Pursue your passion
- Established: 2012
- Local authority: Lancashire
- Head teacher: David Harrow
- Gender: Co-educational
- Age: 0 to 18
- Enrolment: Approx. 800
- Houses: Gawthorpe, Leighton, Rufford, Samlesbury
- Colours: Burgundy, Royal Blue, Hunter Green
- Affiliation: United Church Schools Trust
- Website: akslytham.com

AKS Lytham (AKS), is a private co-educational day school located on the Fylde, Lancashire, England. It is based on a coastal 35-acre site in Lytham St Annes. AKS Lytham is a member of Headmasters' and Headmistresses' Conference and a part of the United Church Schools Trust group of schools.

AKS is a member of the Round Square group of schools, a network of more than 200 schools in fifty countries. The school has an on-site forest school programme.

== History ==
AKS Lytham was formed from the merger of King Edward VII and Queen Mary School (KEQMS) in Lytham St. Annes and Arnold School in Blackpool. In 2000, KEQMS was formed from the merger of King Edward VII School, Lytham and Queen Mary School, meaning that AKS Lytham was formed from three schools. The school was branded as ArnoldKEQMS from 2012 to 2014 and is now known as AKS Lytham.

== Rating ==
In a 2022 inspection, the Independent Schools Inspectorate rated the quality of pupils' academic and other achievements, and the quality of their personal development, as 'excellent', with the Baby and Toddler Room rated as Outstanding in all areas. In 2023, 78% of A level grades were A*-B and 50% of grades were 9-7. The school was listed in 2024 as being one of the top ten Independent Schools in the North West by The Sunday Times.

== Facilities and grounds ==
The AKS Lytham campus has a 35-acre coastal location, a site with playing fields, as well as an artificial all-weather sports ground. The school allows for external hire of their facilities.

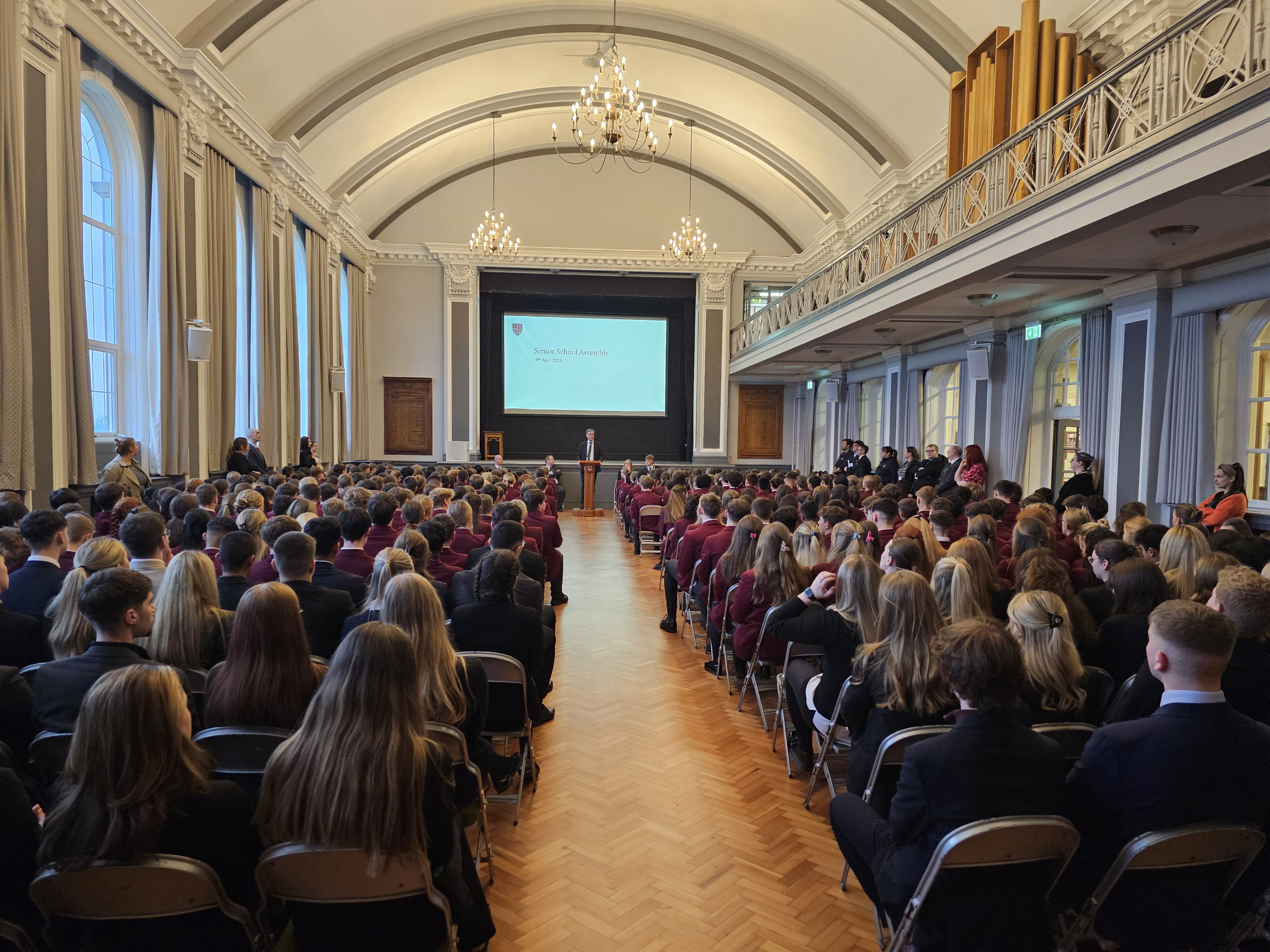
OAKS Hall, Senior School

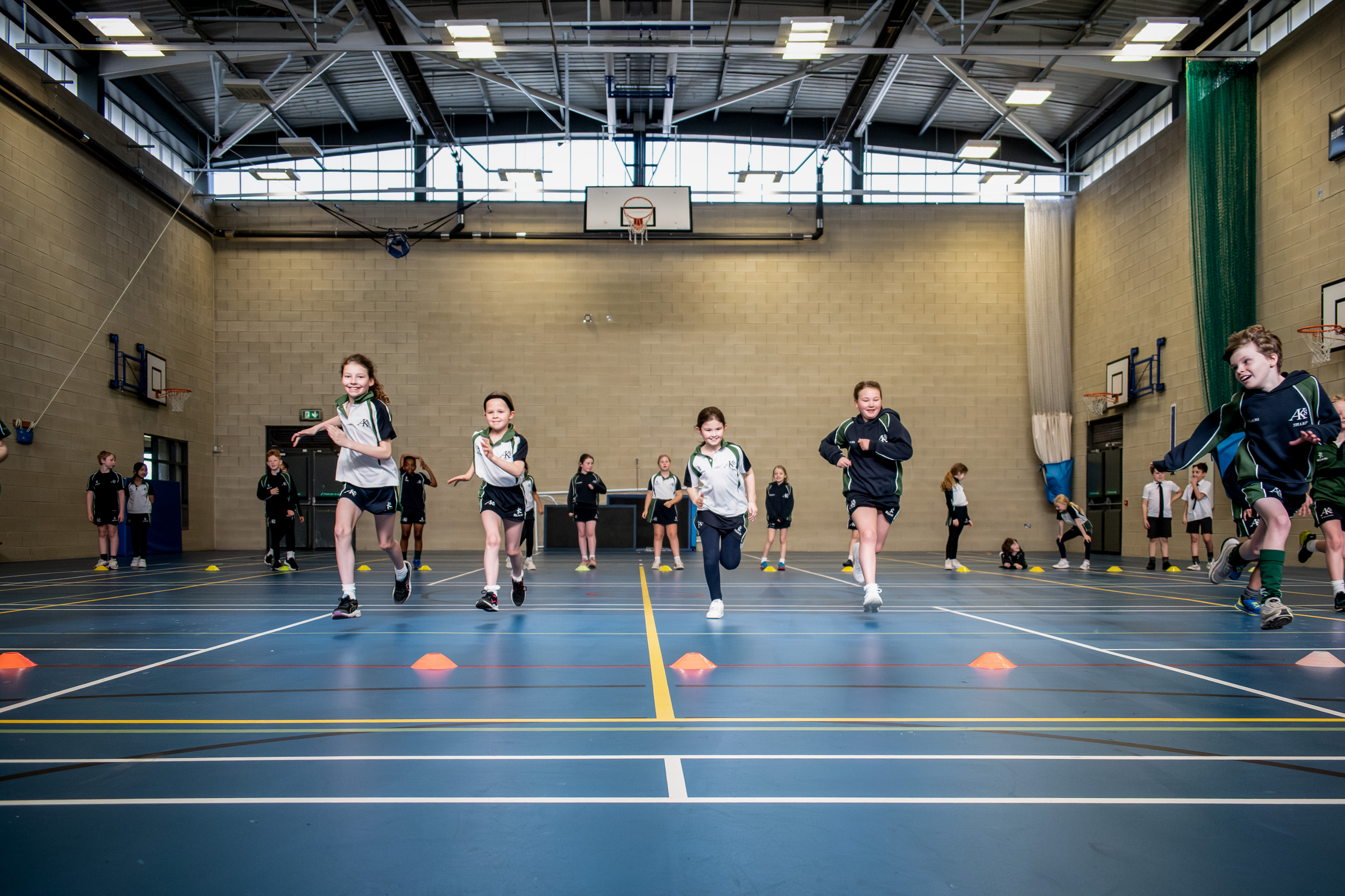
Blue Sports Hall

The school's campus caters for ages 0–18, with a Nursery, Prep School, Senior School, and Sixth Form.

The school hosts lectures for the Lytham St Annes Classical Association, which is the largest branch of the Classical Association.

== School Crest ==
The AKS school crest was introduced in 2017. The decision was made to incorporate the previous coats of arms from all three merged schools, rather than to create a new one. The three previous schools' mottos were removed; these included:

- King Edward VII School - Sublimis Ab Unda, which is Latin for 'raised from the waves', in reference to the fact the school was funded by the 1719 flood disaster.
- Queen Mary School - Semper Fidelis, Semper Parata, which translates to 'Always Faithful, Always Prepared'.
- Arnold School - Honor Virtutis Praemium, which translates to 'Honour is the reward of virtue'.

Both King Edward School and Queen Mary School shared a coat of arms, which then became the KEQMS crest after their 1999 merger. This crest contained Excalibur rising from the ocean, in reference to the King Edward School 1719 flood disaster, as well as a marigold, which grew abundantly on the site of Queen Mary School, and a shell representing the seaside position.

The Arnold School coat of arms was granted in 1999. The shield contained three red roses of Lancashire on a silver field between wedges of Arnold green. Their crest was a red rose between two laurel leaves (for scholarship), standing on silver and blue waves (for Blackpool).

The new crest incorporated all of the above elements in silver and burgundy. It is now used on uniforms and all school properties.

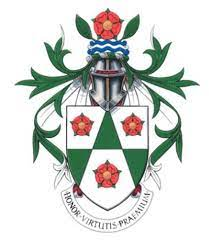
The previous Arnold School coat of arms, incorporating the red roses of Lancashire

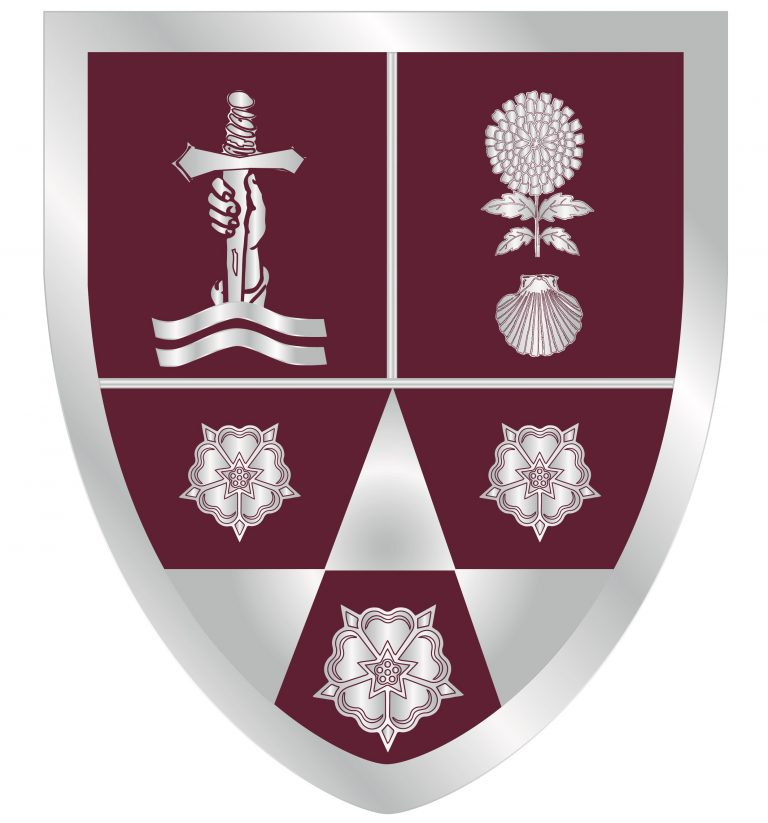
AKS Lytham crest 2017- 2021

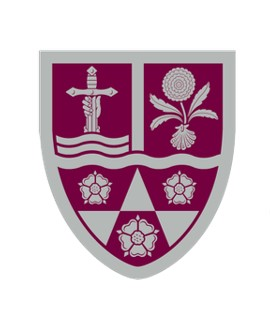
AKS Lytham crest 2021–present
