= Richard Hale School =

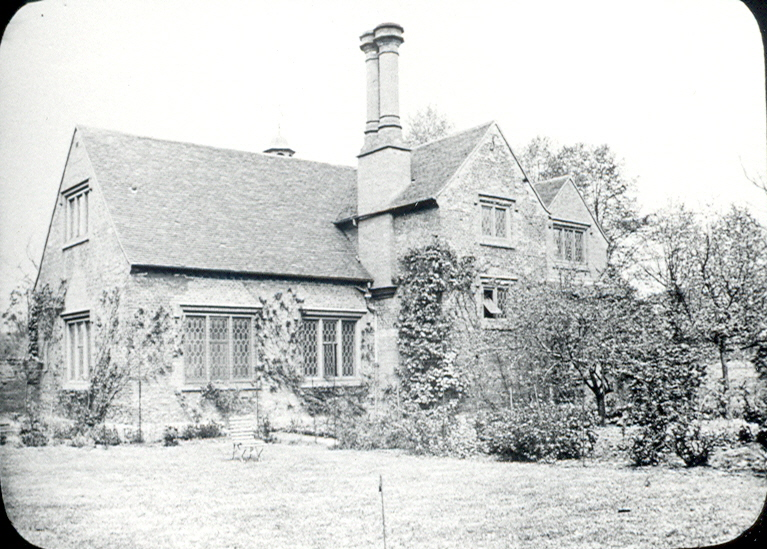
- School badge Hertford Grammar School by Arthur Elsdon c. 1900

Location
- Hale Road; Hertford, SG13 8EN; England; 51°47′33″N 0°04′40″W

Information
- Motto: Doctrina cvm virtvte (Learnedness with virtue)
- Religious affiliation: All
- Established: April 16, 1617; 409 years ago
- Founder: Richard Hale
- Department for Education URN: 139873 Tables
- Ofsted: Reports
- Chair of Governors: Barbara Holm
- Headmaster: Ian Hawkins
- Gender: Boys
- Age: 11 to 18
- Enrolment: 1,650
- Houses: Cowper, Croft, Hale, Kinman, Page, Wallace
- Publication: Hale News
- Website: http://www.richardhale.herts.sch.uk

Richard Hale School is an 11–18 boys' comprehensive school located in Hertford in the south east of England. In the 2014–2015 academic year, the school had over 1,000 pupils including students attending the sixth form, which is also open to girls.

== History ==
The school was founded as "Richard Hale's School" on 16 April 1617 by the affluent merchant Richard Hale, who wished to "erect a grammar school for the instruction of children in the Latin tongue and other literature in the town of Hertford". The original school building was in use for 313 years from 1617 to 1930, and still stands near to All Saints' Church. For most of its life the school was known as the "Hertford Grammar School" until 1967, when it was renamed to coincide with the 350th anniversary. New buildings were built in 1977, the gym was built in 1978 and the Sixth form centre from 2009 to 2011. It became a science college in 2003, a foundation school in 2008, and converted to academy status on 1 July 2013. A new sports hall was also built, opened by former pupil Oliver Skipp in 2022.

== Overview ==
=== Houses ===
Hale gave his name to one of the five original houses of the school. The remaining four were named after the school benefactors Francis Earl Cowper KG and Richard Benyon Croft; and former pupils Lieutenant-Colonel Frank Page, DSO and bar, and the evolutionary biologist Alfred Russel Wallace. These five houses remained for several decades until a sixth house called "Kinman" was added to the growing school, named after the headteacher Major George Kinman who organised the school's move in 1930. This house was for the boys who were previously in an overflow form, and not grouped together with their other house mates. House competition is an integral part of school life at Richard Hale, with competitions taking place not only on the sports fields, but on the stage in both music and drama.

=== Music ===
Students learn instruments and play in its bands and choirs. The music department puts on concerts every year. In January 2017 the concert band and school choir performed at St. Paul's Cathedral in London as part of the school's 400th anniversary.

=== Science ===
The school is a science academy. On 26 April, the school successfully sent a balloon up to the edge of space.

== Notable former pupils ==
- Ant Anstead, television presenter and motor specialist
- Alex Davey ex-Chelsea now playing in the United States, footballer
- Josh Dean (politician), MP for Hertford and Stortford (UK Parliament constituency)
- Mike Fibbens, swimmer
- Rupert Grint, actor
- Billy Lunn and his brother Josh Morgan, musicians of The Subways
- Rob Playford, Drum & Bass DJ, record producer and label owner
- Oliver Skipp, Leicester City and England U21, footballer
- Harry Toffolo, Norwich, Swindon, Lincoln Huddersfield Town, Nottingham Forest footballer
- Mark Williams, former Liberal Democrat MP for Ceredigion 2005-2017

=== Hertford Grammar School ===
- Sir Roy Anderson, Rector of Imperial College London and a notable epidemiologist
- Sir Ernest Birch, colonial administrator
- Nicholas Bell, English-Australian actor
- Prof John Cannon CBE, Professor of Modern History at Newcastle University from 1976 to 1992
- Air Vice-Marshal Leslie William Cannon CB CBE, Commander-in-Chief of the Royal Pakistan Air Force from 1951 to 1955
- Rt Rev Richard Chartres, Bishop of London from 1995 to 2017
- Michael Dobbs, author and screenwriter
- Hugh F. Durrant-Whyte FRS, engineer and academic
- John Fincham FRS FRSE (1926–2005), botanist, geneticist, professor, author and editor
- John Flack, Bishop and Anglican representative to the Holy See, and Bishop of Huntingdon from 1997 to 2003
- David Gentleman, illustrator, and prolific designer of Royal Mail stamps
- John Gladwin, Bishop of Chelmsford since 2004
- Geoff Hamilton, television presenter and gardener
- Captain W. E. Johns, author of the Biggles series
- James Judd, conductor
- Andrew Karpati Kennedy, author and literary critic
- Air Vice-Marshal Alan Merriman CB CBE AFC, Station Commander of RAF Wittering from 1970 to 1972
- Des de Moor, singer, songwriter and writer
- Kenny Pickett, singer of 1960s band The Creation
- Stephen Pound, Labour MP for Ealing North 1997-2019
- Derek Savage, pacifist
- Rt Rev David Smith, Bishop of Maidstone from 1987 to 1992 and Bradford from 1992 to 2002
- John Tydeman OBE, radio producer and director
- Alfred Wallace, naturalist, explorer, geographer, anthropologist, and biologist
- Brian Wilde, actor

=== Richard Hale's School ===
- Bernard Hale (d. 1663), clergyman, academic, and benefactor
