= Sheffield Development Corporation =

- Formation: 1988
- Dissolved: 1997
- Headquarters: Sheffield
- Chairman: Hugh Sykes
- Deputy Chairmen: Lord Fred Mulley; Norman Adsetts
- Chief executive: Keith Beaumont

The Sheffield Development Corporation (SDC) was created in 1988 to oversee the urban regeneration of the Lower Don Valley area of Sheffield, South Yorkshire, England.

== History ==
The area had been the major industrial region of Sheffield but had gone into decline since the 1960s. Huge parts of it were derelict and the city as a whole was suffering from large unemployment. The Corporation was established in 1988 and, in common with other development corporations, it was the planning authority for the area during its existence.

The most significant development during its time was the Meadowhall Centre, which was Europe's largest shopping centre when it was built in 1991. It also brought the Abbey National call centre to the area along with several call centres. Sheffield City Airport was also built during this time but proceeded to close in 2008. The Victoria Quays at the end of the Don Valley Navigation also received a large investment. There was also due to be a four lane link road from junction 34 of the M1 at Meadowhall to the city centre. This was abandoned for a more modest improvement of the local roads when the early 1990s recession struck. In the end a total of 9 miles (14 km) of road was improved.

During its existence it invested £101 million of government money and £7.5 million from the European Union. This was supported by £680 million of private investment. It reclaimed 600 acres (2.4 km^{2}) of land and created over 5,000,000 square feet (460,000 m^{2}) of commercial floor space. It also created 18,000 new jobs. It also regenerated the local landscape with 160,000 trees and shrubs and renovated the Sheffield and South Yorkshire Navigation.

In 1989 there was accusations that the chairman was using his authority for personal financial gain. Although he was never found to be doing anything improper or asked to step down, he did have business interests within the region. He was also a non-executive chairman of a company who invested in regeneration projects in Sheffield.

It was wound down in 1997 with development operations ceasing on 1 April 1997 and dissolved on 1 July 1997.

The land continued to be developed after the dissolution of the SDC. A further 6,000 jobs were already due to be created and £124 million was pledged to redevelopment of Sheffield by the government over the next 7 years. Since 1997 the lower Don Valley has also seen further investment due to its links. Valley Centertainment, including one of the country's largest cinema complexes, has also been built since 1997. In May 2005 Sheffield City Council announced a £1 billion investment scheme for the Attercliffe area taking 20 years to complete.

== See also ==
- Sheffield One
