= Norman Adsetts =

British businessman (1931–2023)

Norman Adsetts OBE
- Born: 6 March 1931
- Died: 25 April 2023 (aged 92)
- Education: The Queen's College, Oxford
- Spouse: Eve Stefanuti (m. 1956)
- Children: 2

Sir William Norman Adsetts OBE (6 March 1931 – 25 April 2023) was a British businessman. He joined firm SIG plc in 1966 and ran as managing director from 1970 to 1996.

== Early years ==
Born in 1931, the son of Ernest Norman Adsetts, Adsetts was educated at King Edward VII School in Sheffield and at The Queen's College, Oxford. After undertaking his National Service in the Royal Air Force he joined Fibreglass Ltd as a graduate trainee in 1955. He and his sister (May Adsetts) lived at 139 Norton Lane, Sheffield. In 1966 he became a director at Sheffield Insulating Company: he went on to be managing director in 1970, Chairman in 1985 and Life President in 1996.

Adsetts held a number of other positions, including chairman of the Yorkshire and Humberside Region of the CBI from 1989 to 1991, chairman of the Sheffield Partnership Limited from 1987 to 1992, deputy chairman of Sheffield Development Corporation from 1991 to 1997, chairman of the board of governors at Sheffield Hallam University from 1993 to 1999, Chairman of Sheffield Theatres Trust Ltd from 1996 to 2005, Trustee of the Hillsborough Disaster Appeal Fund from 1989 to 1996, chairman of Sheffield First for Investment from 1999 to 2002, chairman of the Kelham River-side Development Agency from 1998 to 2002, chairman of the governors of Mount St Mary's College from 1999 to date, member of the Hallam Diocese finance board from 1998 to 2004 and trustee of Research Autism from 2007 to date.

Adsetts was awarded the OBE in the 1988 New Year Honours and knighted in the 1999 Birthday Honours.

== Personal life ==
Adsetts married Eve Stefanuti in 1956. The couple had one daughter, one son, and eight grandchildren. Sir Norman Adsetts was a large contributor to autism foundations and became Chairman of Autism Plus in April 2009. Adsetts attributed his contribution to the fact that two of his own grandchildren are autistic.

In 2012, Adsetts left the board of Autism Plus to become Chairman of The Adsetts Partnership, a holding company of which Autism Plus is a subsidiary. The Adsetts Partnership has also created a network of charities aiming to support the vulnerable.

Sir Norman Adsetts died on 25 April 2023, at the age of 92.
