= Lee Blackett =

English rugby union footballer & coach

Lee Blackett (born 21 November 1982 in Chester, Cheshire, United Kingdom) is an English former rugby union footballer, currently the attack coach for the England national rugby union team.

Educated at King Edward VII and Queen Mary School in Lytham, he played some of his earlier rugby at Fylde Rugby Club. His usual positions were at wing or centre.

He played for and captained Rotherham Titans in the Championship before spending six seasons playing for Leeds Tykes in the Premiership.

== Coaching career ==
In 2013, aged 30, he became the youngest coach in the Championship, when he returned to Rotherham Titans. He joined Wasps as backs coach in 2015

He was appointed interim head coach of Wasps in February 2020 after it was announced Dai Young had stepped down from first-team coaching duties. A role which was later made permanent. He was made redundant on 17 October 2022 when Wasps entered administration.

In November 2022, he was appointed a backs coach at Welsh side Scarlets. In September 2023 he was made backs/attacking coach at Bath Rugby.

In September 2025 he joined the coaching team of Steve Borthwick as attack coach at the English National Rugby team.

== Background ==
Yorkshire Carnegie Tykes initially signed Blackett, a former Rotherham R.U.F.C.|Rotherham Titans captain, near the end of the 2005/2006 season, on loan. He was traded with prop James Isaacson who went to Rotherham. He made his debut for the Tykes against Leicester Tigers on 10 March 2006 in the 2005-06 Guinness Premiership and he made a further two appearances that season. He is a popular player and has many nicknames.

A product of the Rotherham Titans Academy, Blackett was one of the Titans more consistent players after breaking through to the first XV, going onto make 50 appearances for the club and later being honoured with the role of captain at just the age of 23. Blackett gained representative honours with the England Counties XV and was part of the squad that went on tour to South America. He spent four seasons with the Titans, gaining some Premiership experience with the side in 2004 when he made his full senior debut against Bath.

Blackett went on to make a handful of appearances before the side were eventually relegated. In the National Division One he established himself as the first choice No. 12 and in the 2004–05 campaign was an almost ever-present, making 24 appearances for the side and scoring five tries.

Blackett has plenty of experience playing in the National Division One and whilst with Rotherham was regarded as one of the division's top players, with a strong reputation as a reliable defender. Despite only joining the Tykes until the end of the 2005–06 season, Blackett was one of the few players who committed their future to the club at the end of the season; which ended in relegation.

Blackett attended and represented Sheffield Hallam University's 1st XV, playing alongside Sean Lamont and David Strettle.

On 21 March 2008, Blackett scored the Guinness Premiership's fastest-ever try, against Newcastle Falcons in the 2007-08 Guinness Premiership, crossing the try line after just 8.2 seconds.
