= Peter Jaffrey Wheatley =

English chemist

Peter Jaffrey Wheatley (5 March 1921 – 12 May 1997) was an English chemist, who published over 100 papers and 5 books on physical chemistry, crystallography and structural chemistry.

== Biography ==
Wheatley was born on 5 March 1921 in Wilmslow, Cheshire. He was educated at King Edward VII School (photo) in Sheffield, where he was Head Prefect in 1938/1940, Captain of cricket for two years and 1st XI footballer for four. He began a degree at Oxford at the start of World War II, but was soon enlisted as a bombardier. He was captured during the Fall of Singapore in 1942. After four years as a prisoner of war, and working on the Burma railway, and then regaining his health, Wheatley returned to Oxford, studying at Queen's College (1946-1948) and Merton College (1948-1949). He was awarded a first in chemistry in 1948 and a DPhil in physical chemistry in 1951.

Wheatley married Edna Mary Bolton (known as Jo) in Sheffield in 1948. In September 1949 they sailed First Class from Liverpool on the Cunard Line’s Ascania to Quebec, en route to the Twin Cities, where Wheatley was a Commonwealth Fellow at the University of Minnesota for a year. On their return to the UK the first of their daughters was born in 1950. The following year they moved to Leeds, where Wheatley had a Lectureship in Chemistry. Their two other daughters were born in 1953 and 1954.

Biochemist Richard E. Dickerson recalls that “in 1957, Peter J. Wheatley despaired of supporting a wife and two children on his Leeds professorial salary of £900 per annum (then $2,500), resigned from the university, and prepared to move to Zurich to head up a new crystallographic unit for Monsanto.”

After nine years in Switzerland, during which time he published several papers, Wheatley spent a year (1966-67) as visiting professor at the Department of Chemistry, University of Arizona, where he published a paper with John P. Schaefer on the structure of anisomycin.

Wheatley’s last position was in the Department of Physical Chemistry at Cambridge. During his years in Cambridge he became a Fellow of Queens' College “and was renowned at both Departmental and College level for his teaching and lecturing. He also served as British Co-editor of Acta Crystallographica from 1969 to 1980, processing a phenomenal number of papers with care, knowledge and not a little tact!” Wheatley was made a Life Fellow of Queens' when he retired in 1988.

Peter Jaffrey Wheatley died on 12 May 1997, aged 76. His ashes were scattered at Cambridge Crematorium four days later. 'Jo' died in Cambridge on 17 July 2005, aged 80; she was cremated on the 29 July.

== Publications ==
Wheatley published 5 books and more than 100 papers.

=== Books ===
- Determination of Molecular Structure, Clarendon Press, Oxford, 1959 (2nd ed, 1981: ISBN 978-0486640686)
- The Chemical Consequences of Nuclear Spin, North-Holland Publishing Company, 1970 (ISBN 978-0720401707)

=== Papers ===
A list of 62 papers published from to 1948 to 1981 is shown on the Chemistry Tree website.
