= George William Kinman =

George William Kinman (25 December 1862 – 27 July 1927) was Headmaster of Hertford Grammar School from 1905 until his death in 1927. He also headmaster at Dolgelley Grammar School, Chairman of the Ware Education Committee, and a Major in the British Army.

== Family life ==
George William Kinman was born in Sheffield, Yorkshire, England on Christmas Day 1862, the eldest son of a Silversmith George Kinman and his wife Martha Turner. In 1889 Kinman married Rosa Maud Lavington at St George, Hanover Square, London. The couple had one daughter, Phyllis, who died in 1926.

== Education ==
George W. Kinman was educated at Sheffield Collegiate School and at St John's College, Cambridge. A Goldsmith's Exhibitioner, he graduated BA in 1887 with a Second Class in the Classical Tripos, and MA in 1895.

== Dolgelley Grammar School ==
From 1894 to 1903 Kinman was Head Master of Dolgelley Grammar School in North-West Wales. Due to insufficient funding at the time the school was unable to compete with the County School, which received county council funding. By 1901 the school had just 4 pupils and after Kinmans departure in 1903 the remaining pupils were transferred to the County School and by 1912, with the sale of the schools land, Dolgelley Grammar School ceased to exist.

== Other Teaching Posts ==
Kinman is mentioned in the 1949 edition of the school magazine for King Edward VII School, Sheffield:

George William Kinman who won a Goldsmith's Exhibition at St. John's College, Cambridge from the Collegiate School. Later he was for many years the Head Master of Hertford Grammar School, and also Chairman of the Ware Education Committee. The Head Masters of both schools reported that the scholarship scheme had "been completely successful".

He was also Assistant Master at St. James School in Jersey and Hereford House in Brighton and was senior resident instructor at the Army College, Farnham

== Hertford Grammar School ==
In 1903 he was appointed Head Master of Ware Grammar School (by Chairman of Governors Richard Croft), and when that school was amalgamated with Hertford Grammar School in 1905, Major Kinman became Head Master of the now Richard Hale School, a position he maintained until his death in 1927.

=== Educational Philosophy ===
Kinman's educational philosophy was explained by Rev W.D. Penning, writing in the Hertfordshire Mercury after the Major's death:

The Major was devoted to the School and to the boys that came to it. He had his own views as to the work the School was meant to do for the boys, and he held those views strongly, and perhaps with too little tolerance for other views. So he was often in collision with one set or another of those interested in education (notably inspectors, officials, and theorists). Major Kinman held that the true object is to bring up boys to be good men and useful citizens. He trusted more to the outdoor work of his beloved Officer Training Corps, and to drawing and music and handicraft, than to the orthodox book lessons in the classrooms. Discipline and effort in learning, courage in facing difficulties, and the use of knowledge and brain power, however small, that each boy possesses, that was his real curriculum. He believed in men more than the system, and really rather enjoyed the cold looks of inspectors who expected conventional patterns and did not find them.

During his time at Hertford, Kinman commanded the Officer Training Corps at the school and was very proud of the contingent.

=== The Great War ===
It has been remembered that after the First World War the Headmaster 'meticulously' annotated the Registers of his Old Boys killed, wounded and distinguished during the conflict in red ink. William Earl Johns, author of The Biggles stories was a student at the school from 1905. After the Great War he returned to the school for a visit and wrote:

I sat with the Head (that stern man) in his study, that same awful room into which ten years earlier, as a trembling schoolboy, I had more than once gone to take my ‘medicine’. The big bundle of canes no longer stood in the corner. With tears in his eyes he told me of the names of the boys of my time who had gone to the war and would not be coming back. I never saw him again: but I know now how much I owe him.

The Latin words on the School War Memorial are taken from a hymn composed by Major Kinman in the honour of the boys who lost their lives in that war.

=== White Gloves ===
It is perhaps White Gloves which best illustrates Major Kinman’s respect for and use of tradition. Ralph Minors (Head Master 1627–1657) established White Gloves by bequeathing £10 in his will to purchase white gloves for three local dignitaries, the Mayor, Justice and Minister (i.e. Vicar of All Saints), if they attended the December “breaking up” festivities. This was a political move to ensure their active interest in the school in their roles as governors, but by about 1747 the money and the ceremony had disappeared. However, in July 1912 the Mayor of Hertford proceeded in state to the Grammar School in Churchfields, not merely to officiate as guest of honour at the annual prize-giving, but also to receive in remembrance of Ralph Minors a pair of white gloves from the Head Boy, who entertained him first with a short Latin oration. Comic and quasi-historical, maybe, but the Kinman version was entertaining and it served the purpose of strengthening the relationship between the School and the local council. .

=== The Kinman House ===
When it became necessary to establish a new House in 2007, it was decided that Kinman would be commemorated in its name because in keeping with the men commemorated in the other five Houses he contributed significantly to public life, as well as being associated with the School. In his case, of course, the association with the School was profound, with an outlook surprisingly familiar to modern observers. He also oversaw a significant rise in the School’s population: at his first Speech Day, in July 1906, there were 112 boys; by 1927 there were 180–a small number by 21st Century standards, but nevertheless a massive percentage rise.

== Military career ==
During World War I he saw service with various units at home and abroad. From 1914 to 1915 he was with the 10th Battalion of the Bedfordshire Regiment, in 1916 with the 3rd battalion of the same regiment, and later in that year with the IBD Depot in France, in 1917 with the 22nd Training Reserve Battalion, and in 1918 with the 25th Officers' Cadet Battalion. He further served his country in the capacity of Military and Appeal representative for Hertfordshire from 1916–18. He was awarded the Territorial Officers' Decoration which was awarded to officers of the Territorial Force who have completed 20 years' commissioned service in that force, or in its predecessor, the Volunteer Force, and are recommended for the award. Kinman was also mentioned for his services with the Department to the Chief of the Imperial General Staff in 1919.

== Biggles Goes To School ==
William Earl Johns, author of The Biggles Stories joined The Hertford School in January 1905 when Kinman was headmaster. The W.E. Johns website biography states:

In January 1905, Johns went to Hertford Grammar School (now the Richard Hale School, Hertford) where the headmaster was Major Kinman. Some of his experiences here went into his book BIGGLES GOES TO SCHOOL.

In Pamela Shields' book "The Private Lives of Hertfordshire Writers" which includes William Earls Johns, Pamela writes

The headmaster, Major Kinman, was the inspiration for Colonel Horace Chase, head of Malton House School in 'Biggles Goes to School'

== Alfred Russel Wallace ==
Alfred Russel Wallace also attended the Hertford Grammar School until he was withdrawn in 1836 after financial difficulties in his family. In 1910 George William Kinman wrote a short biography on Wallace entitled A Great Hertfordian in which he placed Wallace on the English Olympic team, "if Olympic contests were of an intellectual character."
Two letters from Headmaster George Kinman to Wallace's son William, are kept in the Natural History Museum

The first, dated 19 July 1916, reads,

I shall be very glad indeed to have the pictures mentioned in your letter, whether Dr Wallace painted them himself or not. Perhaps you will kindly inform me as to this.

On the back of the letter William wrote "Two large paintings on canvas & rollers representing scenes in the Malay Archipelago which A.R.W. had done to illustrate lectures."
The second letter from Kinman to William is dated 2 October 1916 and says,

I feel sure you will excuse my long delay in acknowledging the receipt of the pictures.....From your letter I did not think that the pictures were quite such an acquisition as they are. I am hanging them in one of the new class rooms which we intend to fit up as a Geography room – The colours of the walls shows them off admirably and apart from the interest of the subjects they appear to me of considerable artistic value.

== In Memoriam ==
On 31 December 1927 an obituary in The Old Hertfordian Magazine Editorial for George Kinman reads,

The School had lost a Head Master of outstanding character and ability, and we, scholars and old boys, a self-sacrificing manly friend. Major Kinman had ruled and directed the School for the past 21 years, and had eagerly and hopefully looked forward to being still active Head Master when the School moved to its new buildings [finished in 1930]; the members of this Association, most of whom are probably " K's " boys, were ready to share his joy at that event. That cannot now be realised. We are left, nevertheless, with the duty of ensuring that the future life of the School be enriched with all the splendid ideals implanted and fostered by the Major during his 21 years of hard conscientious work.
