= King Edward VII School, Lytham =

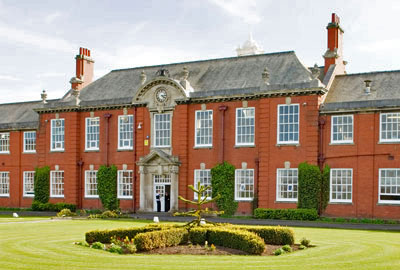
- King Edward VII School entrance, c. 2010.

Location
- Clifton Drive South; Lytham St. Annes, Lancashire, FY8 1DT; England
- Coordinates: 53.741°N 3.010°W

Information
- Funding type: Grammar; direct grant grammar; independent
- Motto: Sublimis Ab Unda ("Raised from the waves")
- Established: 1908
- Closed: Merged 1999–2003
- Local authority: Lancashire
- Gender: Boys
- Colors: Royal Blue, Gold

King Edward VII School (KES) or King Edward School Lytham was a grammar, direct grant grammar and independent school for boys, founded in 1908 and situated in the coastal town of Lytham St. Annes, Lancashire. The school was merged with Queen Mary School for girls in 1999, and was renamed to create the co-educational King Edward VII and Queen Mary School (KEQMS)

The Lytham Schools Foundation was established in 1719 after a flood disaster in the town. In 1908, one hundred and eighty-nine years after the foundation's initial formation, King Edward VII School was opened to provide an education for local boys. The opening of the girls' Queen Mary School followed in 1930.

KEQMS was amalgamated with Arnold School in 2012, to form AKS Lytham, a co-educational independent school that is now situated on the previous King Edward VII School site.

== History ==
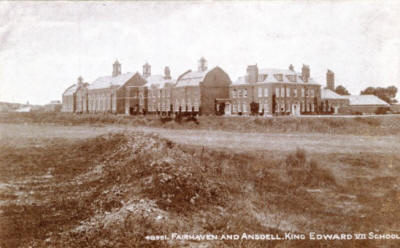
The rear of the school and headmaster's quarters, from St. Paul's Avenue, at opening in 1908.

King Edward VII School was erected on a 32-acre site at Fairhaven (on part of the Fairhaven Golf Club links) on Clifton Drive, alongside St. Paul's Avenue, which was at that time the boundary between Lytham and St.Annes. The site was mainly built upon sand dunes, with close proximity to the coast line. It was founded as a grammar school for boys built by The Lytham Schools Foundation and opened on 25 September 1908.

The school opened with a population of 78 boys. At the outbreak of The Great War in 1914, the school was still relatively young, with an increased population of 180. 37 KES Old Boys were killed in action before the Armistice in 1918, a high proportion from such a small school. A 1921 quote from the headmaster, Bompas Smith, reflecting upon those lost at war reads:

"When the school was opened in 1908 we little thought that the value of life we then began would so soon be tested in the furnace of war. We did our work and played our games and were glad in each other's friendship, and did not know that most of us would soon go to prove their pluck and their endurance in scenes of which we never dreamed. We did not know that only too many among those we honoured would go out never to return."

In 1923, as a result of a surplus in finances at The Lytham Schools Foundation, it was decided that a school for girls was to be built. Eight of the 32 acres of the King Edward's site were given over to Queen Mary's, with an additional 7.5 acres purchased for the new school. Queen Mary School (QMS) for girls opened next-door in 1930. Both schools soon entered the state system as direct grant schools under the Education Act 1944, meaning that there were fee-paying and eleven-plus students.

Joint Christmas parties were held at either KES or QMS alternately after the school was built, to allow the boys and girls of both schools to mix respectively.

At the outbreak of the Second World War, KES pupils spent time digging trenches and building air raid shelters in the sand dunes for both themselves and their neighbours at Queen Mary School. Air-raid practices were carried out and the after dark black-out meant no after school sessions were possible. In September 1939, 300 evacuees from Runcorn and Chorlton High Schools arrived at KES, a school designed to accommodate just 250 boys. This sudden influx meant that space had to be used creatively.

Due to the amount of evacuees arriving at both KES and QMS, increased cooperation ensued between the two schools, with classes mixing frequently and sharing of classrooms and space a regularity. The sixth form began to hold shared lectures, debates and dances, paving the way for the joint dining hall to be opened. In September 1948, the foundation stone of the new joint dining hall for both schools was laid. The new building was to release space for more classrooms at both schools and would allow the King Edward's dining hall to become the library.

As a result of Labour returning to power in 1974 and the enactment of the Direct Grant Grammar Schools (Cessation of Grant) Regulations 1975, schools were required to choose whether to become LEA-maintained comprehensive schools or independent schools without grant. King Edward VII School moved from the direct grant grammar scheme to independence shortly thereafter.

Henry Bompas Smith, c. 1905.

== Headmasters ==
Years	Name	Subject(s) taught
1908 -	Henry Bompas Smith	Mathematics

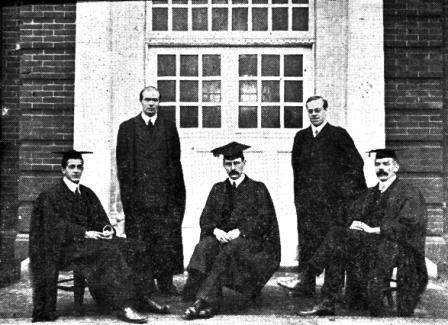
The headmaster, Mr Bompas Smith (centre), and KES professors at opening in 1908.

Henry Bompas Smith was appointed headmaster of King Edward VII School approximately one year before the opening of the school. Bompas Smith was a man well qualified to take charge such a scholastic institution, as the new school promised to be. The headmaster was born in 1867, and received the first portion of his education at Chesterfield Grammar School. He received further tuition at Jena in Germany, and also at the Mansfield Grammar School. From here he went to Oxford, taking the honour of being Open Mathematical Scholar, and also taking first-class in Mathematical Moderations. He obtained first-class in his final classical examination, and left Oxford in 1890, becoming master, for one term, at Sutton Valence School. For the next seven years he was Chief Master on the Modern Side at Shrewsbury. Bompas Smith left Shrewsbury in 1897 to take up the headmastership of the Walsall Grammar School, and during the seven years that elapsed between that date and his appointment at King Edward VII School, the number of boys in attendance rose from 108 to 190, a circumstance that speaks well for the confidence reposed in him by the parents at the time. Bompas-Smith also wrote works of considerable interest to those in the scholastic profession, two of them being Boys and their management in school and A new junior arithmetic".

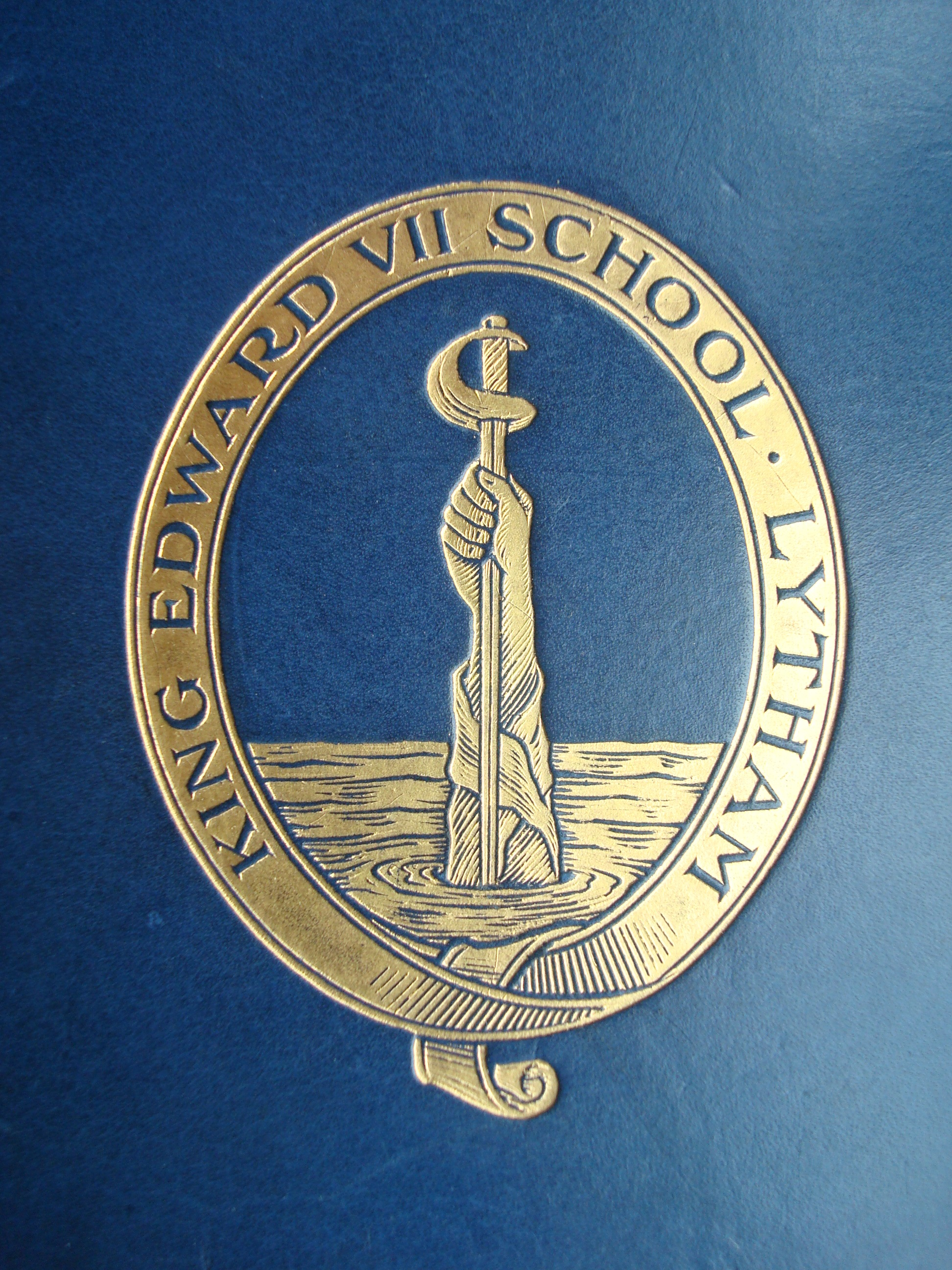
KES School Crest, used from c. 1920.

== Motto & Coat of arms ==
King Edward School's motto was Sublimis Ab Unda, which translates as 'raised from the waves'. This motto was used in reference to the foundation which commissioned the school, The Lytham Schools Foundation, which was created as a result of vast and devastating flooding in the village of Lytham during 1719-1720.

Since opening in 1908, the school's crest showed a hand or arm bearing a sword (said to be Excalibur), rising from the waves of a deep blue ocean. There were multiple versions of the school crest created as designs were modernised and modified for multipurpose use. The school colour of royal blue was consistently maintained throughout these modernisations, both in uniform and in emblems. It is thought that the school crest represented unity, strength and resilience, in the hand raising itself from the depths below.

In 1951, the Lytham Schools Foundation received a Grant of Arms from the College of Heralds, meaning separate coats of arms would be designed for both KES and QMS.

In light of the 1999 merger with QMS, a new shield was designed to incorporate both coats of arms from KES and QMS. The new shield was parti-per-pale and shows the Sublimis Ab Unda crest of KES on one side and a newly designed badge for QMS on the other side.

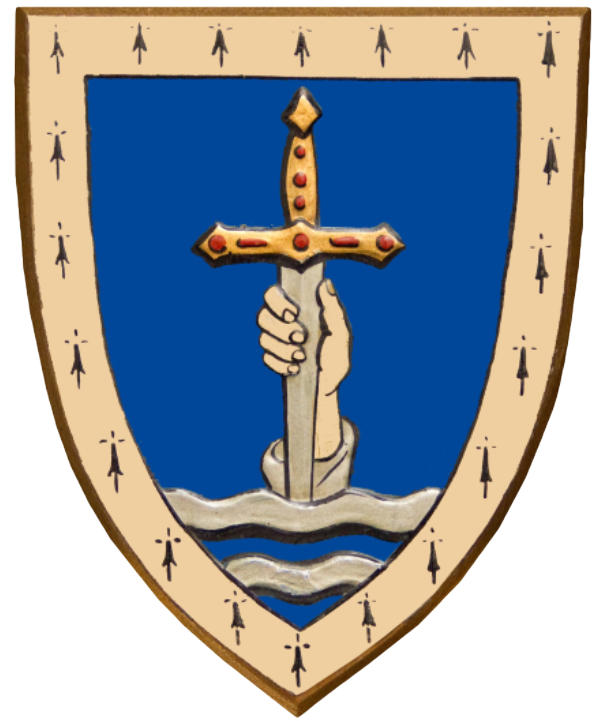
A digital version of the KES crest, c. 1990s.

== Grounds & facilities ==
In December 1901, the trustees of The Lytham Schools Foundation passed the following resolution:

"It is desirable to erect within the Ancient Parish of Lytham a good Secondary School for Boys in which special attention is given to Modern Languages, Mathematics and Science, and that it be part of the Scheme to provide Lecture and Class Rooms for evening instruction including Agricultural School."

The school was financed by the charity and built on a vast 32-acre site, situated on Clifton Drive South and St. Paul's Avenue in Lytham St Annes, KES was built mainly upon a plane of sand, dunes and disused beach land. Eight of these 32 acres were given to Queen Mary School during the neighbouring school's construction during the 1920s. Once construction on QMS was completed, two new tram stops were added on Clifton Drive South, so that access to the two schools was improved drastically.

The Kind Edward School grounds were renowned for their vast size, well-maintained upkeep and multipurpose uses. The school was originally surrounded by cast iron fencing, however, this was removed and used as a part of the war effort of The Second World War.

In 1948, a new joint dining hall was built, in cooperation with QMS, to release space for more classrooms at both schools, thus allowing the King Edward's dining hall to become the current library. The new building marked the loss of part of the huge sand-hill system, much loved by the pupils. They had been used as grandstands to view the exciting finishes of the cross country runs, they had been used as the location for air raid shelters and had also provided cover for the 'bun runs' during morning break to the Boulevard, when hungry boys had taken cover through the hills to stuff their pockets at the nearby shop. All the sand-hills to the rear of Queen Mary's were removed in the 1950s to produce the current playing fields.

The facilities and grounds of KES were regularly updated and developed throughout the 1950s and 1960s, with 'The 1960s block' built to house new departments in Music, Food Technology, Mathematics and English.

In 2005, after the merger with QMS, with the school new renamed as King Edward VII and Queen Mary School (KEQMS), the library was relocated to its former location (in the original dining room) and this underwent extensive redevelopment. The summer of 2007 saw refurbishment of ground floor classrooms in the original 1908 building, and the replacement of many original wooden windows. In 2008 the science laboratories were upgraded and improved. During autumn 2008, the Main School Hall was restored, with the original stage re-instated, as well as the addition of state-of-the-art lighting and sound equipment to suit many hall configurations, including theatre in the round".

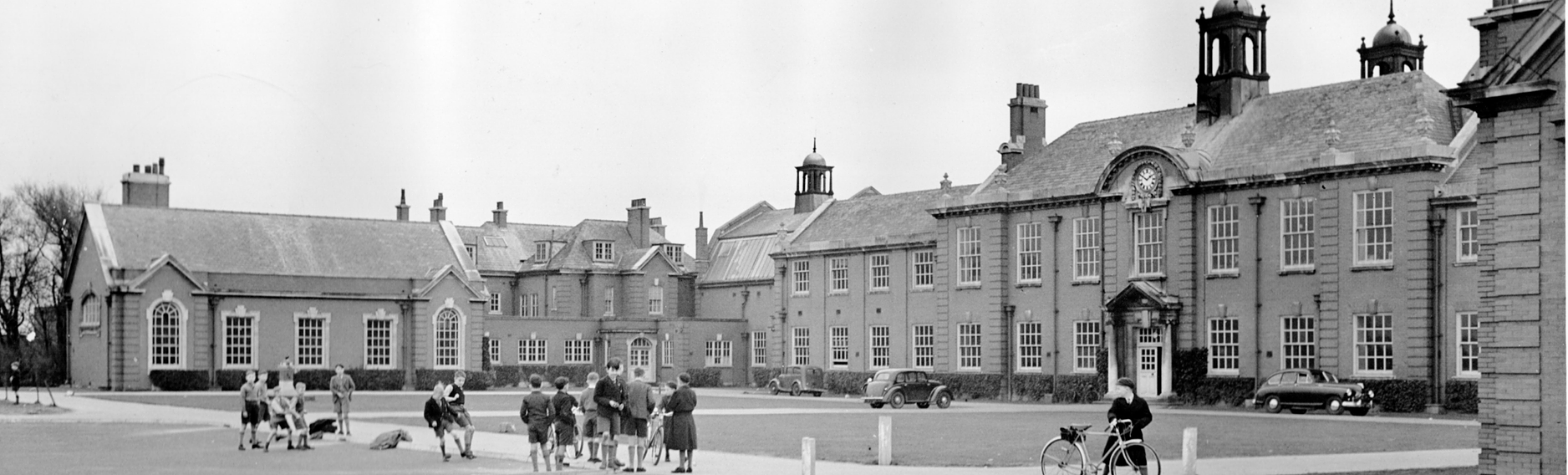
The front of KES during the 1940s.

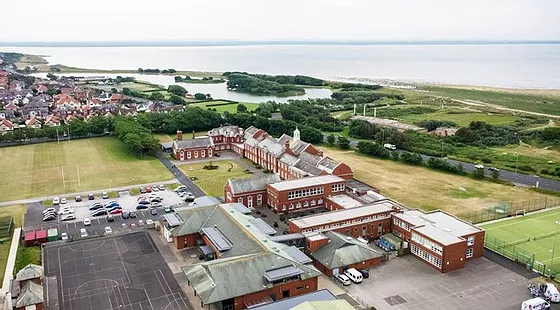
The KES site from above in 2011, then KEQMS.

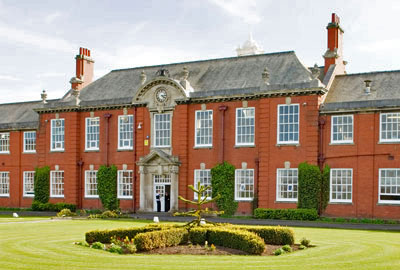
The KES facade in 2013, then AKS Lytham.
