= Arnold School =

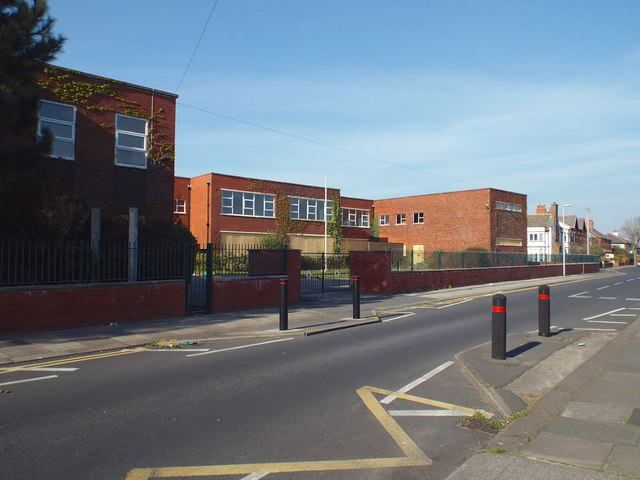
- School buildings after closure (2015)

Location
- Lytham Road; Blackpool, Lancashire, FY4 1JG; England; 53.78946°N 3.04687°W

Information
- Type: Independent school Public school
- Motto: Honor Virtutis Praemium ("Honour is the reward of virtue")
- Established: 1896
- Founder: F. T. Pennington
- Closed: 2013
- Local authority: Blackpool
- Department for Education URN: 119839 Tables
- Head teacher: J. Keefe
- Gender: Coeducational
- Age: 2 to 18
- Houses: Howarths; Listons; Penningtons; School
- Colours: Arnold Green, White
- Former pupils: Old Arnoldians
- Website: www.akslytham.com

Arnold School was an independent school in Blackpool, Lancashire, England, established on the Fylde coast in 1896 during the Victorian expansion of public boarding schools in England.

The school was in the United Church Schools Trust group of schools and was a long-standing member of the Headmasters' and Headmistresses' Conference. In September 2012, Arnold School merged with King Edward VII and Queen Mary School in Lytham St Annes to form Arnold KEQMS (now AKS Lytham), and from September 2013 the new school was fully co-located at the Lytham St Annes site.

== History ==
Arnold School was founded by Frank Truswell Pennington on 4 May 1896. Known initially as South Shore Collegiate School, the school moved to a site in Lytham Road when Pennington took over and gradually expanded the buildings of an earlier Victorian Public School. He then adopted the former school's name of Arnold House School, named after Dr Thomas Arnold, Headmaster of Rugby School. The name was later shortened to Arnold School. The school was founded on Christian principles and a tradition of service. Following Pennington's death, the school enlarged as a Direct Grant boys' grammar school, flanked by a sister Arnold High School for Girls. The abolition of the Direct Grant system placed Arnold School back into independence, and in 1938 the school was then given to the Old Boys, who elected a Governing Council. Arnold High School for Girls became a separate institution and continued as a local authority maintained grammar school. The step towards co-education was taken during the leadership of Cameron Cochrane in 1973–1978. Richard Rhodes, then deputy head, afterwards became the Headmaster, before leaving and becoming headteacher at Rossall School. Arnold merged with King Edward VII and Queen Mary School (KEQMS) in September 2012, forming ArnoldKEQMS which operated on the sites of both original schools until September 2013 when it became wholly based in Lytham St Annes.

== Coat of arms ==
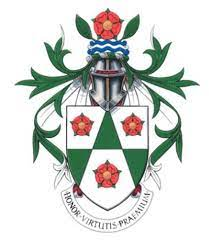
Arnold School coat of arms.

The school was granted a new Coat of Arms in 1999. The shield bears three red roses of Lancashire on a silver field between wedges of Arnold green. The crest is a red rose between two laurel leaves (for scholarship), standing on silver and blue waves (for Blackpool).

== Expansion and development ==
The Victorian school saw significant developments in the mid-20th century and the early 21st century. Some developments include the completion of a new Sixth Form Centre and Preparatory School in 1972; the Art and Music departments in 1981; the Design Centre in 1990; the all-weather playing field in 1993; the Kindergarten in 1995; the Information Technology Centres in 1997; the Modern Languages Faculty in 1997; the Centenary Complex in 1998; the opening of the Windmill Charities Room in 2003.

On 1 June 2008 Arnold School joined the United Church Schools Trust. There followed an immediate investment in the infrastructure of the school, and the installation of the latest technologies available. Major refurbishments of the Sixth Form Centre, Fifth Form Lounge, and Dining Room were also undertaken.

== Amalgamation ==
Arnold merged with King Edward VII & Queen Mary School (KEQMS) in September 2012. The new school is called AKS Lytham. Parent groups opposed to the merger submitted objections to the Charity Commission which prompted a review prior to allowing the merger to proceed. The Charity Commission completed their report and announced on 11 November 2011 that they had approved the decision. A KEQMS parent group immediately announced their intention to appeal against the Charity Commission decision. The appeal was lodged with HM Courts and Tribunal Service – First Tier Tribunal on Friday 9 December 2011. The appeal was heard on 11 and 12 April 2012 and a decision was released by the tribunal on 17 May 2012 stating that the merger was going to proceed. The parents group did not appeal this decision and the merger went ahead in 2013. United Church Schools Trust (a large education charity), the group responsible for the merger, committed to an expenditure in excess of £9 million, in order to upgrade the infrastructure at the Lytham site to accommodate the expanded school.

== Headmasters ==
- 1896–1932 F. T. Pennington
- 1932–1933 H. C. Cooke MA.
- 1933–1938 F. T. Pennington.
- 1938–1966 F. W. Holdgate MA.
- 1966–1973 O. C. Wigmore MA.
- 1973–1979 A. J. C. Cochrane MA.
- 1979–1987 R. D. W. Rhodes JP., BA. (Later headmaster of Rossall School)
- 1987–1993 J. A. B Kelsall MA.
- 1993–2003 W. T. Gillen MA. (Previously headmaster at The King's School, Tynemouth)
- 2003–2010 B. M. Hughes BSc.
- 2010–2012 J. E. Keefe BA.

== Notable Old Arnoldians ==
Honours

- Sir Simon Bryan, High Court Judge and former Chief Justice of the Falkland Islands
- Sir Walter Clegg, Government Chief Whip, Ex-Officio Controller of the Royal Household
- Sir Martin Holdgate, biologist and environmental scientist
- Sir William Lyons, founder of Jaguar Cars
- John Schofield, 1892–1918, World War I Victoria Cross
- John Pritchard, born 1948, Bishop of Oxford

Academic

- Geoffrey Marshall, Provost of the Queen's College, Oxford
- Charles Moseley, Life Fellow of Hughes Hall, Cambridge
- Michael Smith, 1993 Nobel Prize in Chemistry
- John Frederick Wilkinson, FRCP, Lecturer at the University of Manchester and physician at Manchester Royal Infirmary

Public life / Commerce

- Victoria Atkins (born 1976), British politician
- Keith Gledhill, Deputy Lieutenant of Lancashire, High Sheriff of Lancashire
- Geoffrey Thompson, 1936–2004, owner of Blackpool Pleasure Beach

Sport

- Jimmy Armfield CBE, 43 caps for the England national football team (15 as captain)
- Ian Bell, Rugby Union Wasps
- Christian Day, Northampton Saints rugby union player
- George Eastham OBE, 19 caps for England Soccer
- Tom Graveney, 79 tests for England Cricket
- Richard Halsall, ECB National Fielding Coach
- Steve Hesford, Rugby League Warrington and England
- Barrie-Jon Mather, 3 caps for Great Britain Rugby League, 2 caps for England Rugby League, 1 cap for England Rugby Union
- Fred Mitchell, 1 cap for England Soccer, also Great Britain and England amateur international
- David Stephenson, 10 caps for Great Britain Rugby League
- Natalie Panagarry England netballer

Arts/Theatre/TV

- Jonas Armstrong, actor, Robin in the BBC's Robin Hood
- David Ball, Member of pop group Soft Cell
- Jenna Coleman, actress in Emmerdale, Doctor Who and Victoria
- Ian Levine, music producer
- Chris Lowe, member of the Pet Shop Boys
- Peter Purves, TV Personality and Doctor Who actor
- Edgar Metcalfe, actor and theatre director
- Nicola Thorp, actress in Coronation Street
- David Wilde, pianist and composer
- Tim Woolcock, painter

Literature

- Stephen Booth, crime fiction writer
