= SIG plc =

British company

- Company type: Public
- Traded as: LSE: SHI
- Industry: Construction Products, off site manufacturing
- Founded: 1957
- Founder: Ernest Adsetts
- Headquarters: Sheffield, England
- Key people: Andrew Allner, Chairman; Pim Vervaat, CEO
- Revenue: ▼£2,591.0 million (2025)
- Operating income: ▲£32.1 million (2025)
- Net income: ▼£(64.1) million (2025)
- Website: www.sigplc.com

SIG plc is a British-based international supplier of insulation, roofing, commercial interiors and specialist construction products. It is listed on the London Stock Exchange.

It was originally established as Sheffield Insulations Limited in 1959 by Ernest Adsetts; his son, Norman Adsetts, was appointed managing director in 1970 and chairman in 1985. Four years later, it was floated on the London Stock Exchange as Sheffield Insulations Group plc. Amid a spree of acquisitions in the 1990s, the company was rebranded as SIG plc in 1995. The early to mid 2000s saw further acquisitions and a few divestments amid strong profitability, the firm exiting the US market and entering the French one instead. The start of the Great Recession in 2008 led to the prompt closure of 80 branches and loss of 1,000 jobs at SIG; the company had largely recovered by 2012, permitting expansion in the European market. The mid 2010s saw several divestments, such as of its German roofing division in exchange for £9 million. By 2017, further restructuring was underway and, in February 2018, it was revealed that the firm's profits had been overstated, leading to an investigation of the auditor. The COVID-19 pandemic in the United Kingdom was attributed for losses recorded in the early 2020s.

== History ==
The company was founded in Sheffield by Ernest Adsetts under the name Sheffield Insulations Limited in 1957. Nine years later, his son, Norman Adsetts, joined the firm and became its managing director in 1970; he became its chairman in 1985. The company underwent a floatation on the London Stock Exchange in 1989, when it became Sheffield Insulations Group plc. The company expanded rapidly during the early 1990s, acquiring Ceilings Distribution Ltd, a UK-based supplier of ceilings products, in 1990, and Freeman Group, a large British insulation distributor, and the German firm Isokauf in 1994, and Komfort Systems, a supplier of partition systems for offices, in 1995.

The company was renamed SIG plc in 1995. One year later, Norman Adsetts retired. Acquisitions made during the latter half of the 1990s included WKT and Golinski of Germany in 1996, and Asphaltic, a major UK roofing supplier, CP Supplies and Branton Industries and Distribution International in the United States in 1997. In 2000, the company bought Nouwens Group in the Netherlands, and in 2001, it purchased Capco, suppliers of interiors, roofing and insulation in the United Kingdom and Ireland. This was followed in 2002 by the acquisition of AM Proos and Clydesdale Roofing Supplies. In 2002, David Williams was appointed Chief Executive.

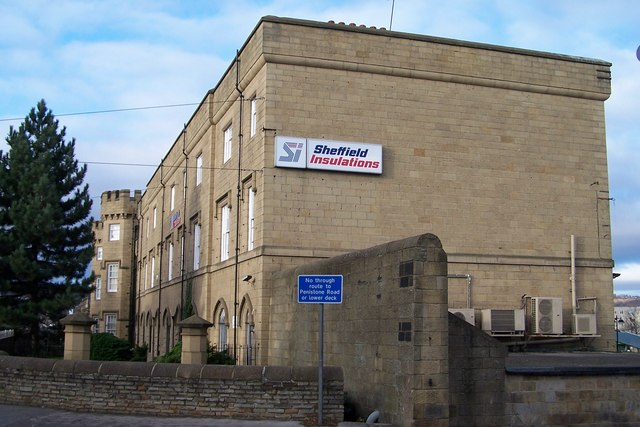
SIG offices at Hillsborough Barracks

In 2004, the company bought Orion Trent Insulation, another UK distributor, with Leaderflush Shapland (formerly LS Group), a manufacturer of door sets for hospitals following in 2005. During 2006, SIG purchases Wodan and WIG in Poland, and opted to exit the US market. That same year, it recorded a profit of £94 million, in excess of prior expectations.

During 2007, SIG completed the acquisition of Lariviere, the transaction marking its entrance into the French roofing market. That same year, the Bristol-based firm General Fixings was also acquired, and SIG moved into the refractory business through the purchase of MacGregor and Moir, one of Europe's leading specialists of high temperature insulation and refractory solutions. In 2008, it bought Air Trade Centre International B.V., a Dutch air conditioning business.

In 2008, David Williams retired, with Chris Davies taking his place as the company's chief executive. That same year, the Great Recession set in, impacting the wider construction market as well as SIG specifically; the company enacted several cuts, which included the closure of 80 branches and cutting 1,000 jobs, in response to a lengthy drop in sales.

In June 2011, SIG announced the divestment of its safety and workwear business to British distributor Bunzl. Positive financial results were reported in 2012, which permitted new branches to be opened in the UK, France, and Germany.

Stuart Mitchell was appointed as CEO in March 2013. One year later, the firm sold its 50 per cent stake in the renewable heating specialist Ice Energy Technologies for only £1, and divested its German roofing division in exchange for £9 million.

Meinie Oldersma became CEO of SIG amid a period of losses and restructuring in March 2017. In February 2018, it was announced that SIG's profits had been overstated by roughly £6.6 million, leading to the company's auditors being subject to an investigation. That same month, SIG Building Systems, which specialised in modular offsite construction, was sold for only £1 to Urban Splash.

Steve Francis became the company's CEO in April 2020. That same year, Kingspan made an unsuccessful attempt to purchase SIG's building solutions division, however, negotiations did not result in an agreement and were eventually called off. In September 2020, it was announced that SIG has recorded a £125 million loss for the previous six months, which was attributed to the COVID-19 pandemic in the United Kingdom.

Gavin Slark was named CEO of SIG in 2023, but, in May 2025, announced he would join rival Travis Perkins in December 2025; SIG put him on 'gardening leave' and appointed Pim Vervaat as the company's new CEO.

== Operations ==
The company serves a wide range of markets across the building, construction, off site manufacturing and process sectors, from premises throughout Europe and the Middle East.
