= Geoff Turner =

Australian rules footballer

Personal information
- Full name: Geoffrey Lawrance Turner
- Born: 7 September 1928
- Died: 8 September 2017 (aged 89)
- Original team: Brighton
- Height: 175 cm (5 ft 9 in)
- Weight: 72 kg (159 lb)

Playing career^{1}
Years	Club	Games (Goals)
1953	St Kilda	11 (1)
- ^{1} Playing statistics correct to the end of 1953.

Geoff Turner (7 September 1928 – 8 September 2017) was an Australian rules footballer who played for the St Kilda Football Club in the Victorian Football League (VFL).
