= Henry John Chaytor =

Henry John Chaytor (1871–1954), British academic, classicist and hispanist, was Master of St Catharine's College, Cambridge from 1933 to 1946.

== Biography ==
After teaching at Merchant Taylors', Crosby, Chaytor was appointed second master at King Edward VII School, Sheffield in 1905; in 1908 he left Sheffield to become headmaster of Plymouth College. In 1919 he took up a Fellowship at St Catharine's College, Cambridge and became Master in 1933.
