= Geoffrey Turner (GC) =

Geoffrey Gledhill Turner
- Born: 10 September 1903; Sheffield, Yorkshire
- Died: 9 February 1959 (aged 55); Halstead, Essex
- Military career
- Allegiance: United Kingdom
- Branch: Royal Naval Volunteer Reserve
- Service years: 1939–1946
- Rank: Commander
- Conflicts: Second World War
- Awards: George Cross; George Medal; King's Commendation for Brave Conduct

Commander Geoffrey Gledhill Turner, GC, GM (10 September 1903 – 9 February 1959) was an officer in the Royal Naval Volunteer Reserve during the Second World War and a recipient of the George Cross. He is one of only eight people who have won both the George Cross and George Medal.

== Early life ==
Turner was born in Sheffield on 10 September 1903 the eldest son of Charles Turner a Chartered Accountant and his wife Kathleen. Turner attended King Edward VII School in Sheffield from 1911 to 1921.

== Second World War ==
Turner was responsible for defusing a succession of unexploded bombs and mines during the Blitz in Yorkshire and Lancashire. He was awarded his George Cross for tackling a bomb which fell on Seaforth, near the Liverpool-Southport railway line. The fuse was badly damaged and exploded while Turner was attempting to remove it, wounding him. Notice of his award appeared in The London Gazette on 27 June 1941. The citation in read: "for great gallantry and undaunted devotion to duty".

Turner was also awarded the George Medal, this for recovering a mine from a German plane that had been shot down at Fairlight, near Hastings in Sussex. The citation was published in The London Gazette on 18 May 1943.
