= King Edward VII and Queen Mary School =

KEQMS

Location
- Clifton Drive South; Lytham St Annes, Lancashire, FY8 1DT; England
- Coordinates: 53.741°N 3.010°W

Information
- Type: Independent
- Established: 1908
- Closed: 2012
- Local authority: Lancashire
- Gender: Co-educational
- Age: 2 to 18
- Enrolment: 700
- Houses: Ashton, Talbot, Lowther, Clifton
- Colour: Royal Blue

King Edward VII and Queen Mary School (KEQMS) was an HMC independent co-educational school in Lytham St Annes, Lancashire, England, formed in 2000 by the merger of King Edward VII School and Queen Mary School. It merged with Arnold School, Blackpool, in 2012 to form AKS Lytham.

The Lytham Schools Foundation was established in 1719 after a flood disaster in the town. In 1908, one hundred and eighty-nine years after the Foundation's initial formation, King Edward VII School was opened to provide an education for local boys. The opening of the girls' Queen Mary School followed in 1930.

It had a reputation of excellence in sports and a thriving history of drama productions and had links with the Czech Republic, France and Germany, with which exchange trips were frequently held (and still are by AKS Lytham).

== Merger ==
The Board of Governors announced that King Edward VII and Queen Mary School would be merging with Arnold School, another fee-paying school in the North-West, in September 2012. This happened without consultation inclusive of parents, pupils or staff. A parent group opposed to the takeover submitted objections to the Charity Commission which prompted a review prior to allowing the merger to proceed. The Charity Commission completed their report and announced on 11 November 2011 that they had approved the new scheme. The parent group immediately announced their intention to appeal against the Charity Commission decision. The appeal was lodged with HM Courts and Tribunal Service – First Tier Tribunal on Friday 9 December 2011. The tribunal's decision was made on 17 May 2012 and stated that the merger could proceed, however the lease agreement put the charity assets at undue risk and needed to be re-written. The parents group then announced that they were not going to appeal and the merger therefore proceeded.

In 2011 Fylde M.P. Mark Menzies became involved in the heated controversy surrounding the proposed take-over of the school by the United Church Schools Trust and its merger with Arnold School.

== Motto ==
King Edward School's motto was 'Sublimis Ab Unda', which is Latin for 'raised from the waves', in reference to the fact the school was funded by the aforementioned flood disaster. Queen Mary School's motto was 'Semper Fidelis, Semper Parata', which translates as 'Always Faithful, Always Prepared'. The two former schools each had a coat of arms, but despite the two schools being separate they shared the same governing body, which itself had a coat of arms, that consisted of the two schools' coats of arms impaled. This coat of arms was used for the combined school since the merger in 1999. The uniforms for both boys and girls were also changed at this time. As of 2008, a new rebrand of the KEQMS brand was launched. A new logo was produced, and the motto was changed to 'Inspiring Personal Excellence'

== Amalgamation ==
After a reduction in student numbers following New Labour's abolition of the Assisted Places Scheme in 1997, the two single-sex schools merged. Now fully co-educational and housed in and around the old King Edward VII building, it consisted of a Kindergarten, Infant, Junior and Senior School, plus a Sixth Form. The Queen Mary site was sold in order to raise money for the continuing development of the new school. The original Queen Mary building was given listed status and has been adapted into housing.

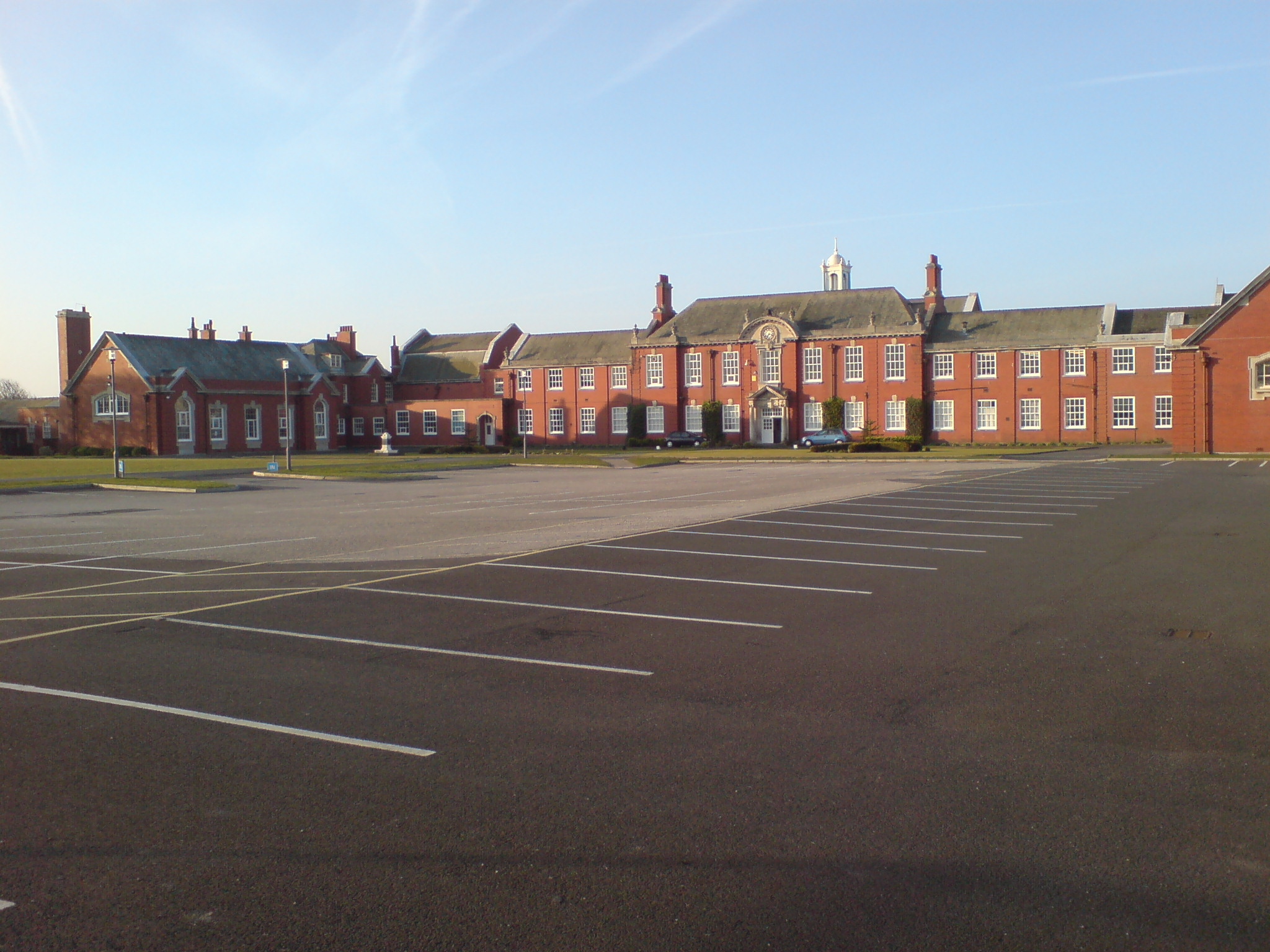
KEQMS Main Building

== Notable former pupils ==
Notable former pupils (Lidunians) include:

King Edward VII School

- Malcolm Archer (born 1952), organist and director of music, St Paul's Cathedral
- Steve Barclay (born 1972), conservative politician
- Lee Blackett (born 1982), rugby union player/coach
- Simon Brailsford, equerry to Her Majesty the Queen
- Roy Harper (born 1941), singer songwriter
- Andy Inglis (born 1960), board member, BP
- Michael Mingos (born 1944), principal of St Edmund Hall, Oxford
- Robert Neill (born 1905), writer
- John Sunderland (born 1945), chairman of Cadbury Schweppes and president of the Confederation of British Industry
- Frank Duckworth (born 1939), Duckworth-Lewis-Stern method.
