= King Edward VII School, Sheffield =

King Edward VII School
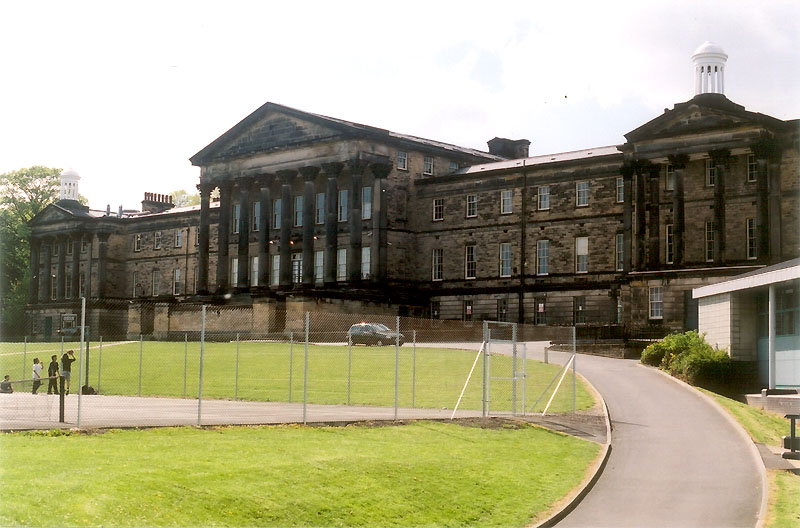
- King Edward VII School

Location
- Glossop Road; Broomhill; Sheffield, South Yorkshire, S10 2PW; England; 53.3762°N 1.4957°W

Information
- Type: Comprehensive; Community school
- Motto: fac recte, nil time (Do right, fear nothing)
- Established: 1905
- Local authority: Sheffield City Council
- Department for Education URN: 107140 Tables
- Ofsted: Reports
- Headteacher: Louisa Warde
- Gender: Coeducational
- Age: 11 to 18
- Enrolment: 1,619
- Alumni: Old Edwardians
- Public transport: B Y University of Sheffield (Glossop Road site)
- Website: http://www.kes.sheffield.sch.uk

King Edward VII School is a coeducational secondary school and sixth form located in Sheffield, South Yorkshire, England.

== History ==
The school's history is older than its name suggests. It can be traced to a Royal Charter granted in 1604 for the "Free School of King James", the result of a legacy of Thomas Smith who had died the previous year. However, there are traces of the school as far back as the thirteenth century, like a number in other towns of mediaeval England (see Old Edwardians website for more details).

The name "King Edward VII School" was created in 1905 using the name of the reigning monarch, when Wesley College was merged with Sheffield Royal Grammar School on the site of the former on Glossop Road. The former buildings of Wesley College, now King Edward VII upper school, designed and built by the Sheffield architect, William Flockton in 1838, were Grade II* listed in 1973.

The School supported a Junior School until the advent of the 11-plus entry that was a consequence of the Education Act 1944. The last boys left the junior school in 1947 and the 1948 entry was the first entirely from the 11-plus.

The final 11-plus examination entry was in 1968 and from September 1969 the school's intake was for a co-educational comprehensive school. Girls were admitted in 1969 to Crosspool Secondary Modern School which became the lower school for King Edward VII School. In 2005, the school celebrated its 100th anniversary. During 2011–12 a major building programme of extension and refurbishment was undertaken.

== Current status ==
The school has two sites: the lower school (KS3) on Darwin Lane, and the upper school (KS4, Sixth Form and Language College) on Glossop Road.

The school is described in the 2006 OFSTED report of 13 September 2006 as a mixed community secondary school (11–19). The school has 1,678 students in all, 524 of whom are in the 6th form.

In 2015, the school received an OFSTED score of "good".

Of the 6th form roughly 50% originate from the lower school, the remainder coming from other schools in the Sheffield region (many of which are 11–16).

The chair of governors is Peter Dickson and the headteacher is Louisa Warde.

The upper school was refurbished in 2010–2012, with the addition of a sports hall and science block, as part of the BSF (Building Schools for the Future) programme; work began in July 2010 and finished in May 2012.

== Headteachers of King Edward VII School ==
- 1905–1926 J. H. Hichens
- 1926–1928 Ronald Gurner
- 1928–1938 R. B. Graham, MA
- 1938–1950 Arthur W Barton
- 1950–1965 Nathaniel L Clapton
- 1966–1988 Russell Sharrock
- 1988–2008 Michael Lewis
- 2008–2016 Beverley Jackson
- 2016–2026 Linda Gooden
- Present - Louisa Warde

== Notable former pupils of King Edward VII School ==
See List of Old Edwardians (Sheffield) and also Category:People educated at King Edward VII School, Sheffield.

== Notable former staff of King Edward VII School ==
- Devon van Oostrum, professional basketball player
- Henry John Chaytor, 1905–08, second master, became master of St Catharine's College, Cambridge
- Francis Ernest Brown, 1905–12, second master after Chaytor's departure, became headmaster of Geelong Grammar School in Australia
- Horace Brearley, 1937–46 (father of Mike Brearley, England cricketer)
- E F Watling, 1924–60, classics master and translator of Sophocles

== Bibliography ==
- Cornwell, John (2005). King Ted's (PDF). King Edward VII School, Sheffield. ISBN 0-9526484-1-5.
- Various (1995). Tha'll never gerr in theer... King Edward VII School, Sheffield. ISBN 0-9526484-0-7.
- MacBeth, George (1987). A Child of the War. Jonathan Cape Ltd. ISBN 0-224-02436-1.
